= Pearl Jam 2006 World Tour =

Concert tour by Pearl Jam

2006 World Tour
- Tour by Pearl Jam
- Location: North America; Europe; Australia
- Associated album: Pearl Jam
- Start date: May 9, 2006
- End date: December 2, 2006
- Legs: 4
- No. of shows: 33 in North America; 23 in Europe; 12 in Australia; 68 in total

Pearl Jam concert chronology
- 2005 North American/Latin American Tour (2005); 2006 World Tour (2006); 2007 European Tour (2007)

The Pearl Jam 2006 World Tour was a concert tour by the American rock band Pearl Jam to support its eighth album, Pearl Jam.

== History ==
Pearl Jam promoted its self-titled album with tours in North America, Europe, and Australia in 2006. As a warm-up for the tour, European fans were treated to a small show at the London Astoria in London, England on April 20, 2006, where Pearl Jam performed the new material and debuted live performances of "Marker in the Sand" and "Army Reserve". The first leg of the North American tour focused on the Northeastern United States. The band opened with a two-night stand in Toronto, Ontario, Canada at the Air Canada Centre which featured rock band My Morning Jacket as the opening act. Pearl Jam concluded on June 3, 2006, in East Rutherford, New Jersey at Continental Airlines Arena. The band moved to the Midwest and the West Coast for the tour's second leg. The second leg began on June 23, 2006, with a show in Pittsburgh, Pennsylvania at Mellon Arena and ended with a two-night stand at The Gorge Amphitheatre in George, Washington. This tour included three two-night stands opening for Tom Petty and the Heartbreakers on Petty's Highway Companion tour. Sonic Youth opened for Pearl Jam during the majority of the tour's second leg.

Pearl Jam went on to tour Europe for its first time in six years. The band began the 2006 tour with a show on August 23, 2006, in Dublin, Ireland at the Point Theatre. The concert gained wide radio play in the UK and Ireland. The band headlined the Reading and Leeds Festivals in August 2006, despite having vowed to never play at a festival again after Roskilde. In an interview in advance of the band's return to the festival circuit, guitarist Stone Gossard commented, "It seems like an era to trust that we're aware enough to get through those bigger shows. We have a heightened awareness of what needs to happen every night so people are as safe as they can possibly be." Vocalist Eddie Vedder started both concerts with an emotional plea to the crowd to look after each other. He commented during the Leeds set that the band's decision to play a festival for the first time after Roskilde had nothing to do with "guts" but with trust in the audience. Safety measures at the festivals included a second barrier in front of the main stage to prevent a crush at the front. The band continued on to the Netherlands, Belgium, Spain, Portugal, France, Switzerland, Italy, Czech Republic, Germany, Austria, and Croatia and concluded on September 30, 2006, in Athens, Greece at OAKA Sports Hall. On September 19, 2006, at the Torino, Italy show at Palaisozaki, Pearl Jam played Pearl Jam in its entirety in order midway through its set.

Following Europe, the band headed to Australia in November of the same year (2006). The Australian tour began on November 7, 2006, in Sydney, before continuing through Brisbane, Melbourne, Newcastle, and Adelaide, and concluding on November 25, 2006, in Perth at Subiaco Oval. Every city on this tour received at least two shows except for Newcastle and Perth; Sydney and Melbourne received three. Pearl Jam finished the year with a show in Hawaii, headlining a show on December 2, 2006, at Blaisdell Arena in Honolulu.

The official bootlegs on this tour were available via Pearl Jam's official website in MP3 and lossless FLAC formats. The band's shows at The Gorge Amphitheatre were released as part of the Live at the Gorge 05/06 box set. A DVD documenting the band's shows in Italy entitled Immagine in Cornice was released in 2007.

== Tour dates ==
Date	City	Country	Venue	Attendance (tickets sold / total available)	Revenue
North America
May 9, 2006	Toronto	Canada	Air Canada Centre	34,834 / 34,834	$2,190,741
May 10, 2006	Toronto	Canada	Air Canada Centre	34,834 / 34,834	$2,190,741
May 12, 2006	Albany	United States	Pepsi Arena	13,044 / 13,044	$710,984
May 13, 2006	Hartford	United States	New England Dodge Music Center	22,909 / 22,909	$793,901
May 16, 2006	Chicago	United States	United Center	33,790 / 33,790	$2,429,361
May 17, 2006	Chicago	United States	United Center	33,790 / 33,790	$2,429,361
May 19, 2006	Grand Rapids	United States	Van Andel Arena	12,397 / 12,397	$800,503
May 20, 2006	Cleveland	United States	Quicken Loans Arena		
May 22, 2006	Auburn Hills	United States	The Palace of Auburn Hills	16,219 / 16,219	$949,298
May 24, 2006	Boston	United States	TD Banknorth Garden	27,941 / 27,941	$2,230,413
May 25, 2006	Boston	United States	TD Banknorth Garden	27,941 / 27,941	$2,230,413
May 27, 2006	Camden	United States	Tweeter Center at the Waterfront	50,662 / 50,662	$3,060,869
May 28, 2006	Camden	United States	Tweeter Center at the Waterfront	50,662 / 50,662	$3,060,869
May 30, 2006	Washington, D.C.	United States	Verizon Center	15,128 / 15,128	$1,179,297
June 1, 2006	East Rutherford	United States	Continental Airlines Arena	35,868 / 35,868	$2,175,643
June 3, 2006	East Rutherford	United States	Continental Airlines Arena	35,868 / 35,868	$2,175,643
June 23, 2006	Pittsburgh	United States	Mellon Arena	12,633 / 12,633	$969,090
June 24, 2006	Cincinnati	United States	U.S. Bank Arena	13,640 / 13,640	$870,880
June 26, 2006	St. Paul	United States	Xcel Energy Center	31,062 / 31,062	$2,204,593
June 27, 2006	St. Paul	United States	Xcel Energy Center	31,062 / 31,062	$2,204,593
June 29, 2006^{[A]}	Milwaukee	United States	Marcus Amphitheater		
June 30, 2006^{[A]}	Milwaukee	United States	Marcus Amphitheater		
July 2, 2006	Denver	United States	Pepsi Center		
July 3, 2006	Denver	United States	Pepsi Center		
July 6, 2006	Las Vegas	United States	MGM Grand Garden Arena	14,230 / 14,230	$1,573,953
July 7, 2006	San Diego	United States	Cox Arena	11,153 / 11,875	$790,868
July 9, 2006	Inglewood	United States	The Inglewood Forum	31,861 / 31,861	$1,767,792
July 10, 2006	Inglewood	United States	The Inglewood Forum	31,861 / 31,861	$1,767,792
July 12, 2006	Los Angeles	United States	Henry Fonda Theater		
July 13, 2006	Santa Barbara	United States	Santa Barbara Bowl		
July 15, 2006	San Francisco	United States	Bill Graham Civic Auditorium		
July 16, 2006	San Francisco	United States	Bill Graham Civic Auditorium		
July 18, 2006	San Francisco	United States	Bill Graham Civic Auditorium		
July 20, 2006	Portland	United States	Arlene Schnitzer Concert Hall		
July 22, 2006	George, Washington	United States	The Gorge Amphitheatre	43,878 / 43,878	$3,166,654
July 23, 2006	George, Washington	United States	The Gorge Amphitheatre	43,878 / 43,878	$3,166,654
Europe
August 23, 2006	Dublin	Ireland	Point Theatre		
August 25, 2006^{[B]}	Leeds	England	Bramham Park		
August 27, 2006^{[C]}	Reading	England	Little John's Farm		
August 29, 2006	Arnhem	Netherlands	GelreDome	31,932 / 31,932	$3,822,160
August 30, 2006	Antwerp	Belgium	Sportpaleis	15,862 / 15,862	$1,389,266
September 1, 2006	Barcelona	Spain	Pavello Olimpic de Badalona	8,685 / 8,685	$521,099
September 2, 2006^{[D]}	Vitoria	Spain	Azkena Festival Grounds		
September 4, 2006	Lisbon	Portugal	Pavilhão Atlântico	33,460 / 33,460	$3,286,166
September 5, 2006	Lisbon	Portugal	Pavilhão Atlântico	33,460 / 33,460	$3,286,166
September 7, 2006	Madrid	Spain	Palacio de Deportes de la Comunidad	15,499 / 15,548	$1,058,986
September 9, 2006	Marseille	France	Le Dôme de Marseille		
September 11, 2006	Paris	France	Palais Omnisports de Paris-Bercy	15,906 / 15,906	$1,395,370
September 13, 2006	Bern	Switzerland	Stade de Suisse	38,762 / 38,762	$3,354,198
September 14, 2006	Bologna	Italy	PalaMalaguti		
September 16, 2006	Verona	Italy	Verona Arena	15,000 / 15,000	$1,234,879
September 17, 2006	Milan	Italy	Mediolanum Forum	9,500 / 9,500	$577,179
September 19, 2006	Torino	Italy	Torino Palasport Olimpico		
September 20, 2006	Pistoia	Italy	Piazza del Duomo		
September 22, 2006	Prague	Czech Republic	Sazka Arena	18,000 / 18,000	$1,922,912
September 23, 2006	Berlin	Germany	Wuhlheide		
September 25, 2006	Vienna	Austria	Wiener Stadthalle		
September 26, 2006	Zagreb	Croatia	Dom Sportova		
September 30, 2006	Athens	Greece	OAKA Sports Hall		
Oceania
November 7, 2006	Sydney	Australia	Acer Arena		
November 8, 2006	Sydney	Australia	Acer Arena		
November 10, 2006	Brisbane	Australia	Brisbane Entertainment Centre		
November 11, 2006	Brisbane	Australia	Brisbane Entertainment Centre		
November 13, 2006	Melbourne	Australia	Rod Laver Arena		
November 14, 2006	Melbourne	Australia	Rod Laver Arena		
November 16, 2006	Melbourne	Australia	Rod Laver Arena		
November 18, 2006	Sydney	Australia	Acer Arena		
November 19, 2006	Newcastle	Australia	Newcastle Entertainment Centre		
November 21, 2006	Adelaide	Australia	Adelaide Entertainment Centre		
November 22, 2006	Adelaide	Australia	Adelaide Entertainment Centre		
November 25, 2006	Perth	Australia	Subiaco Oval		
North America
December 2, 2006	Honolulu	United States	Neal S. Blaisdell Center		

Festivals and other miscellaneous performances
^{A} This concert was a part of "Summerfest"
^{B} This concert was a part of "Leeds Festival"
^{C} This concert was a part of "Reading Festival"
^{D} This concert was a part of "Azkena Rock Festival"

== Band members ==
Pearl Jam

- Jeff Ament – bass guitar
- Stone Gossard – rhythm guitar, lead guitar
- Mike McCready – lead guitar
- Eddie Vedder – lead vocals, guitar
- Matt Cameron – drums

Additional musicians

- Boom Gaspar – Hammond B3 and keyboards

== Songs performed ==
Originals

- "1/2 Full"
- "Alive"
- "All or None"
- "Alone"
- "Animal"
- "Army Reserve"
- "Around the Bend"
- "Bee Girl"
- "Better Man"
- "Big Wave"
- "Black"
- "Blood"
- "Brain of J."
- "Breakerfall"
- "Breath"
- "Bu$hleaguer"
- "Can't Keep"
- "Comatose"
- "Come Back"
- "Corduroy"
- "Daughter"
- "Dead Man"
- "Dirty Frank"
- "Dissident"
- "Do the Evolution"
- "Don't Gimme No Lip"
- "Down"
- "Drifting"
- "Education"
- "Elderly Woman Behind the Counter in a Small Town"
- "Even Flow"
- "Faithfull"
- "Fatal"
- "Footsteps"
- "Garden"
- "Given to Fly"
- "Glorified G"
- "Go"
- "Gods' Dice"
- "Gone"
- "Green Disease"
- "Grievance"
- "Hail, Hail"
- "Hard to Imagine"
- "I Am Mine"
- "I Got Id"
- "I'm Open" (snippet)
- "Immortality"
- "In Hiding"
- "In My Tree"
- "Indifference"
- "Inside Job"
- "Insignificance"
- "Jeremy"
- "Last Exit"
- "Leash"
- "Leatherman"
- "Life Wasted"
- "Light Years"
- "Long Road"
- "Love Boat Captain"
- "Low Light"
- "Lukin"
- "Man of the Hour"
- "Marker in the Sand"
- "MFC"
- "Not for You"
- "Nothing as It Seems"
- "Nothingman"
- "Oceans"
- "Of the Girl"
- "Off He Goes"
- "Once"
- "Parachutes"
- "Parting Ways"
- "Porch"
- "Present Tense"
- "Rats"
- "Rearviewmirror"
- "Red Mosquito"
- "Release"
- "Sad"
- "Satan's Bed"
- "Save You"
- "Severed Hand"
- "Sleight of Hand"
- "Smile"
- "Sometimes"
- "Soon Forget"
- "Spin the Black Circle"
- "State of Love and Trust"
- "Thin Air"
- "Thumbing My Way"
- "Tremor Christ"
- "U"
- "Undone"
- "Unemployable"
- "Untitled"
- "W.M.A." (snippet)
- "Wash"
- "Wasted Reprise"
- "Whipping"
- "Why Go"
- "Wishlist"
- "World Wide Suicide"
- "Yellow Ledbetter"
- "You Are"
- "You're True"

Covers

- "All Along the Watchtower" (Bob Dylan)
- "American Girl" (Tom Petty)
- "American in Me" (Avengers)
- "Androgynous Mind" (Sonic Youth) (snippet)
- "Another Brick in the Wall" (Pink Floyd) (snippet)
- "Atomic Dog" (George Clinton) (snippet)
- "Baba O'Riley" (The Who)
- "Baby, Please Don't Go" (Big Joe Williams) (snippet)
- "Beast of Burden" (The Rolling Stones) (snippet)
- "Beds Are Burning" (Midnight Oil) (snippet)
- "Blitzkrieg Bop" (Ramones) (snippet)
- "The Boys Are Back in Town" (Thin Lizzy)
- "Check on It" (Beyoncé Knowles) (snippet)
- "Cinnamon Girl" (Neil Young) (snippet)
- "Crazy Mary" (Victoria Williams)
- "Crown of Thorns" (Mother Love Bone)
- "Don't Be Shy" (Cat Stevens)
- "Forever Young" (Bob Dylan)
- "Fortunate Son" (Creedence Clearwater Revival)
- "Fuckin' Up" (Neil Young)
- "Gimme Some Truth" (John Lennon)
- "Good Woman" (Cat Power) (snippet)
- "Happy Birthday" (traditional)
- "Harvest Moon" (Neil Young)
- "Hawaiʻi '78" (Israel Kamakawiwo'ole)
- "Here's to the State of Mississippi" (Phil Ochs)
- "Hunger Strike" (Temple of the Dog)
- "I Believe in Miracles" (Ramones)
- "I Can't Explain" (The Who)
- "I Got You" (Split Enz)
- "I Must Not Think Bad Thoughts" (X)
- "I Won't Back Down" (Tom Petty)
- "Interstellar Overdrive" (Pink Floyd) (snippet)
- "It Makes No Difference" (The Band)
- "It's OK" (Dead Moon) (snippet)
- "Kick Out the Jams" (MC5)
- "The Kids Are Alright" (The Who)
- "Last Kiss" (Wayne Cochran)
- "Leaving Here" (Edward Holland, Jr.)
- "Little Sister" (Elvis Presley)
- "Little Wing" (Jimi Hendrix)
- "Masters of War" (Bob Dylan)
- "Modern Girl" (Sleater-Kinney) (snippet)
- "Mother" (John Lennon with the Plastic Ono Band) (snippet)
- "My Sharona" (The Knack) (snippet)
- "No Woman, No Cry" (Bob Marley) (snippet)
- "Picture in a Frame" (Tom Waits)
- "Rainy Day Women No. 12 & 35" (Bob Dylan)
- "Rockin' in the Free World" (Neil Young)
- "Romanza" (anonymous) (snippet)
- "Ruby Tuesday" (The Rolling Stones) (snippet)
- "Save It for Later" (The Beat) (snippet)
- "So Lonely" (The Police) (snippet)
- "So You Want to Be a Rock 'n' Roll Star" (The Byrds)
- "A Sort of Homecoming" (U2) (snippet)
- "The Star-Spangled Banner" (Francis Scott Key and John Stafford Smith)
- "Throw Your Arms Around Me" (Hunters & Collectors)
- "Throw Your Hatred Down" (Neil Young)
- "Today Your Love, Tomorrow the World" (Ramones) (snippet)
- "The Waiting" (Tom Petty)
- "Waiting on a Friend" (The Rolling Stones)
- "Walking the Cow" (Daniel Johnston)
- "War" (Edwin Starr) (snippet)
- "With My Own Two Hands" (Ben Harper) (snippet)
- "You've Got to Hide Your Love Away" (The Beatles)

== Gallery ==
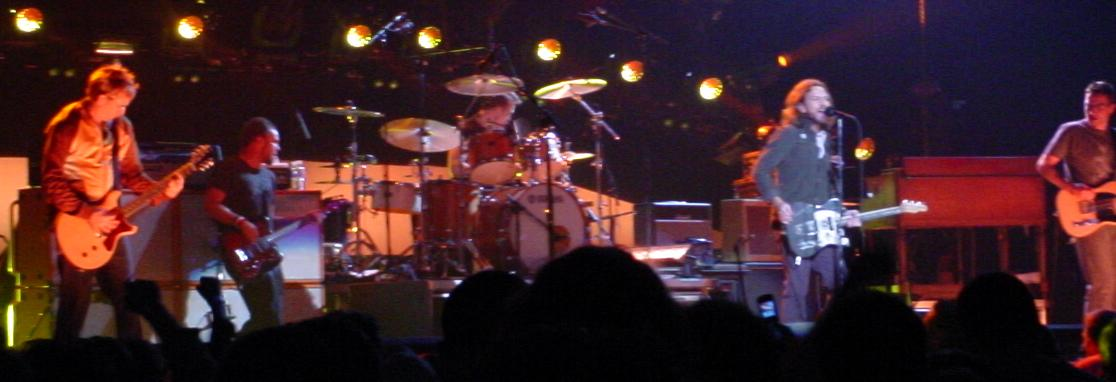
Pearl Jam in Toronto, Canada on May 10, 2006.

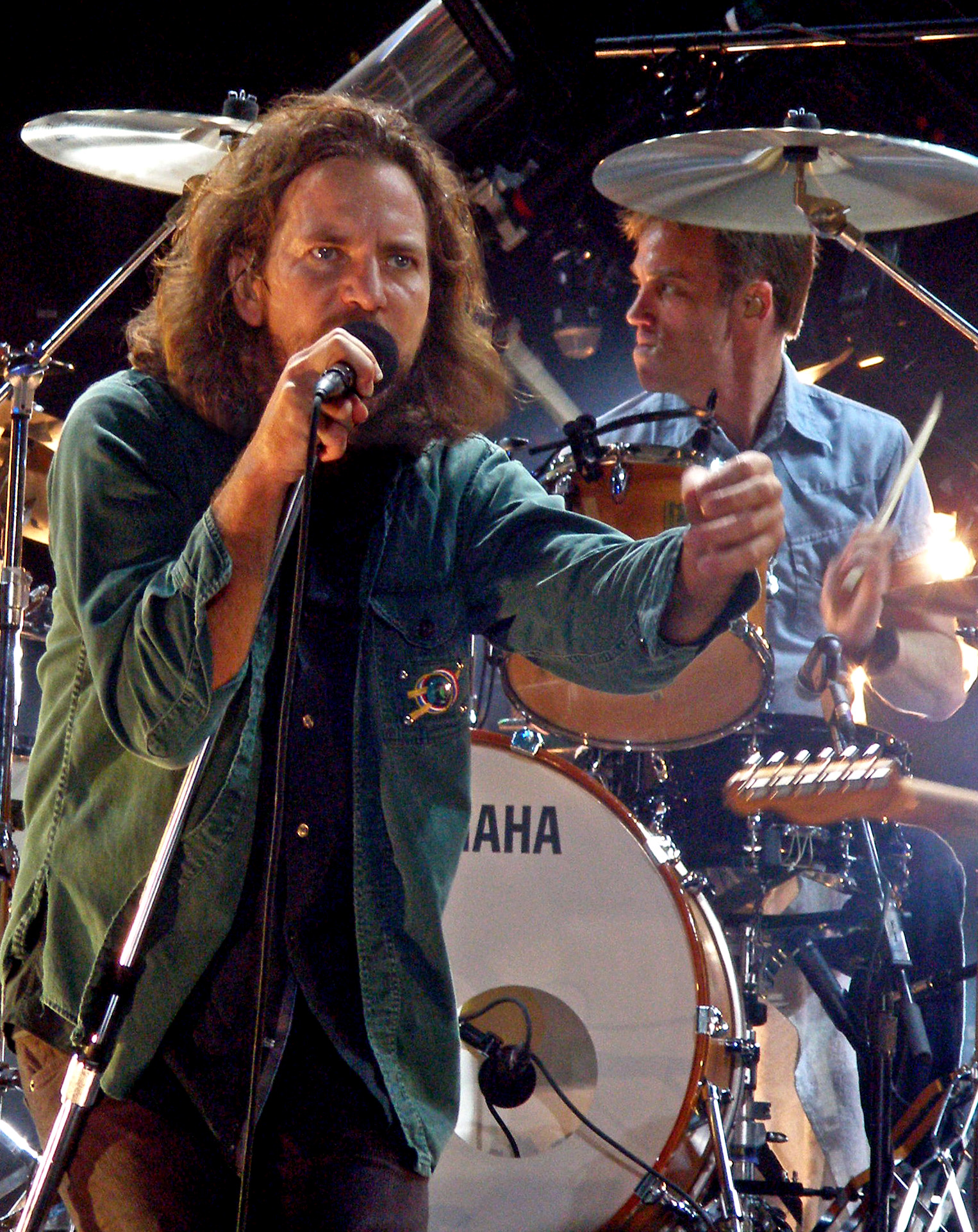
Pearl Jam in Albany, New York on May 12, 2006.

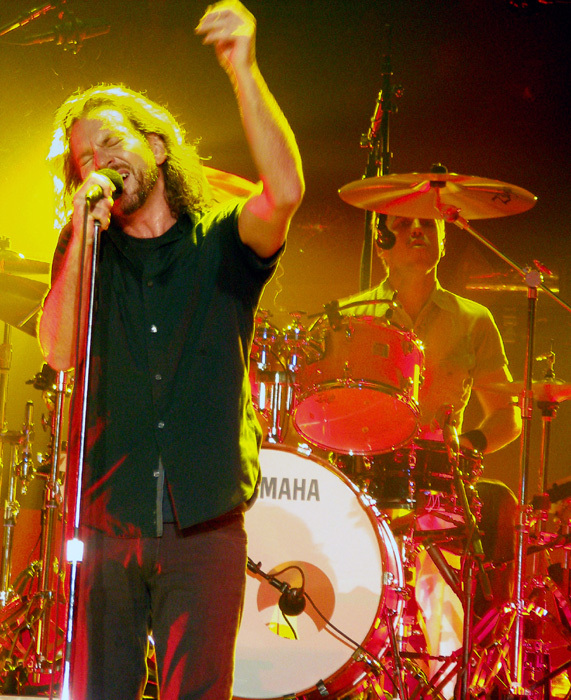
Pearl Jam in Albany, New York on May 12, 2006.

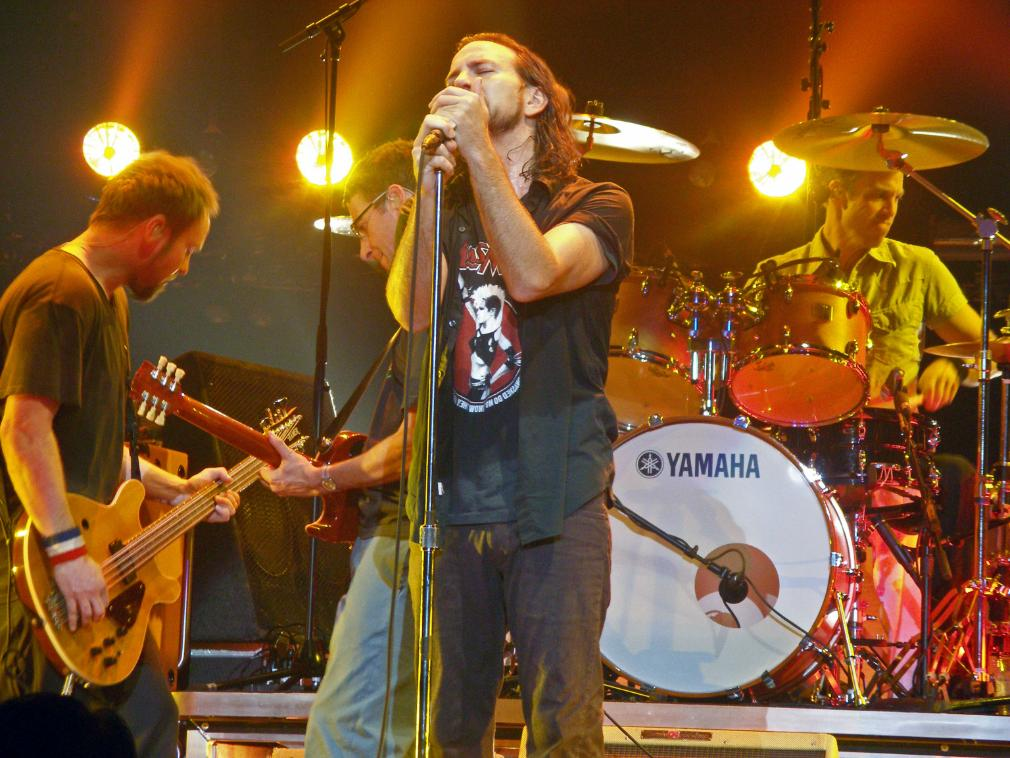
Pearl Jam in Albany, New York on May 12, 2006.

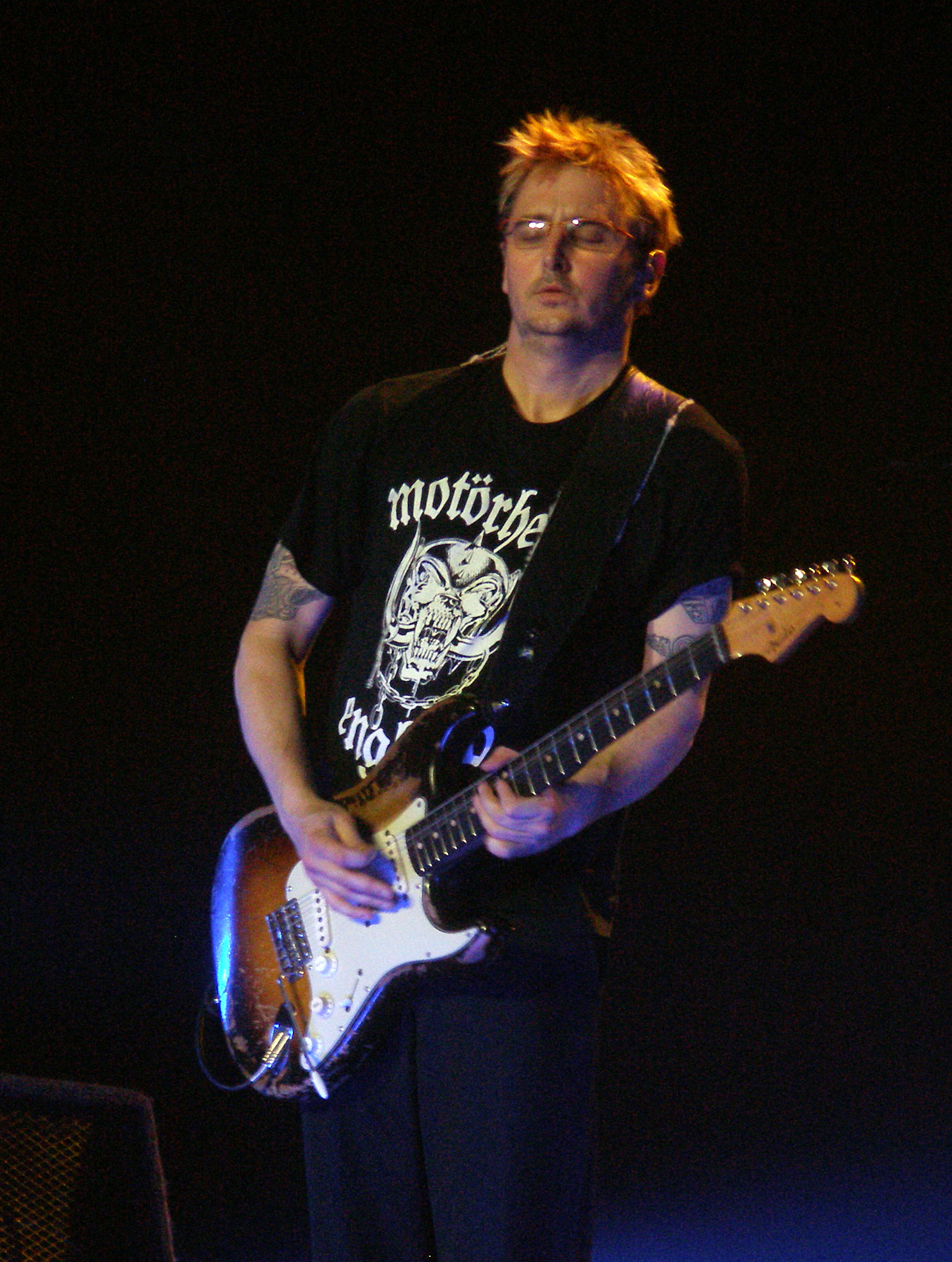
Mike McCready on stage with Pearl Jam in Albany, New York on May 12, 2006.

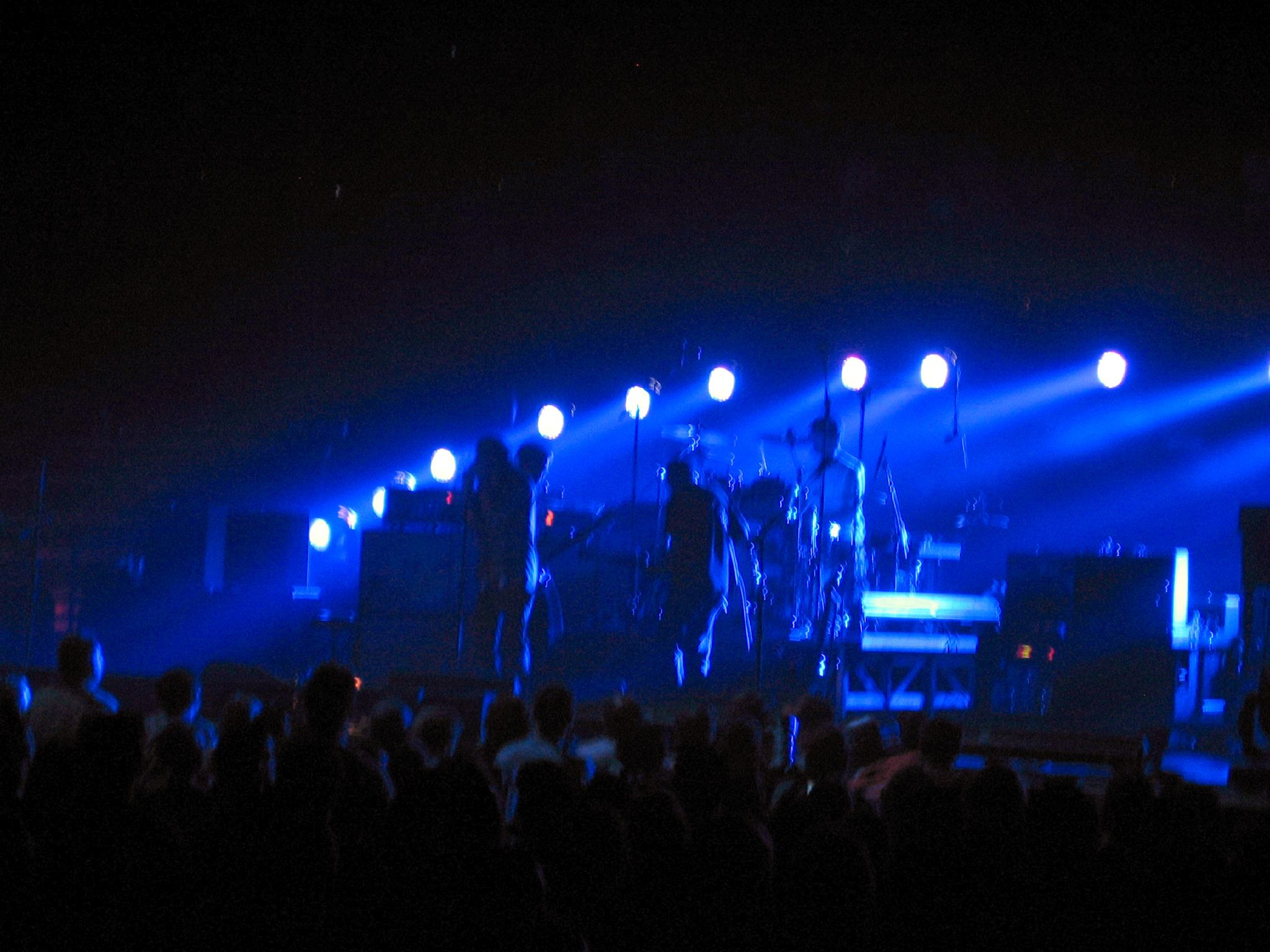
Pearl Jam in San Diego on July 7, 2006.

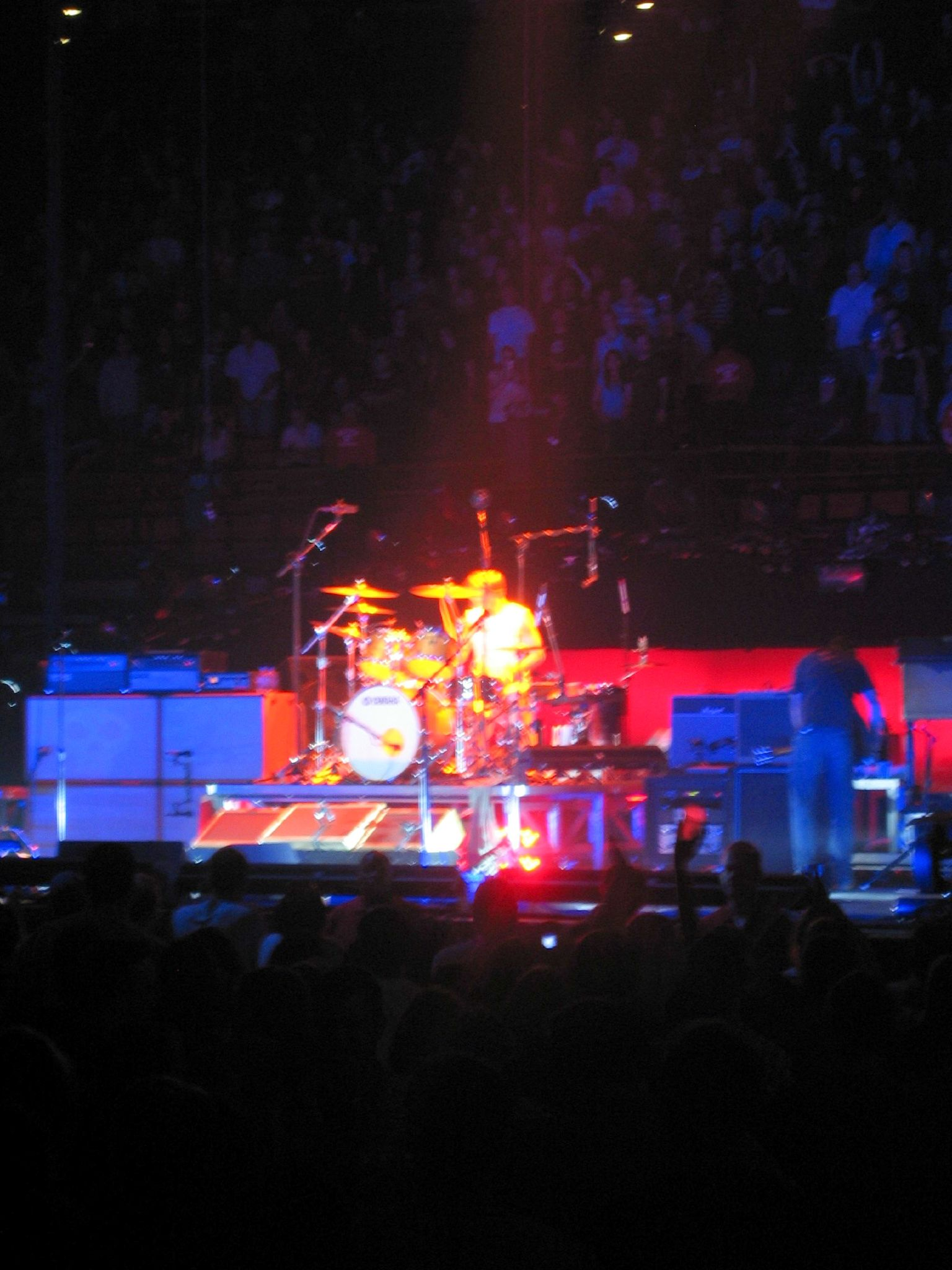
Pearl Jam in San Diego on July 7, 2006.

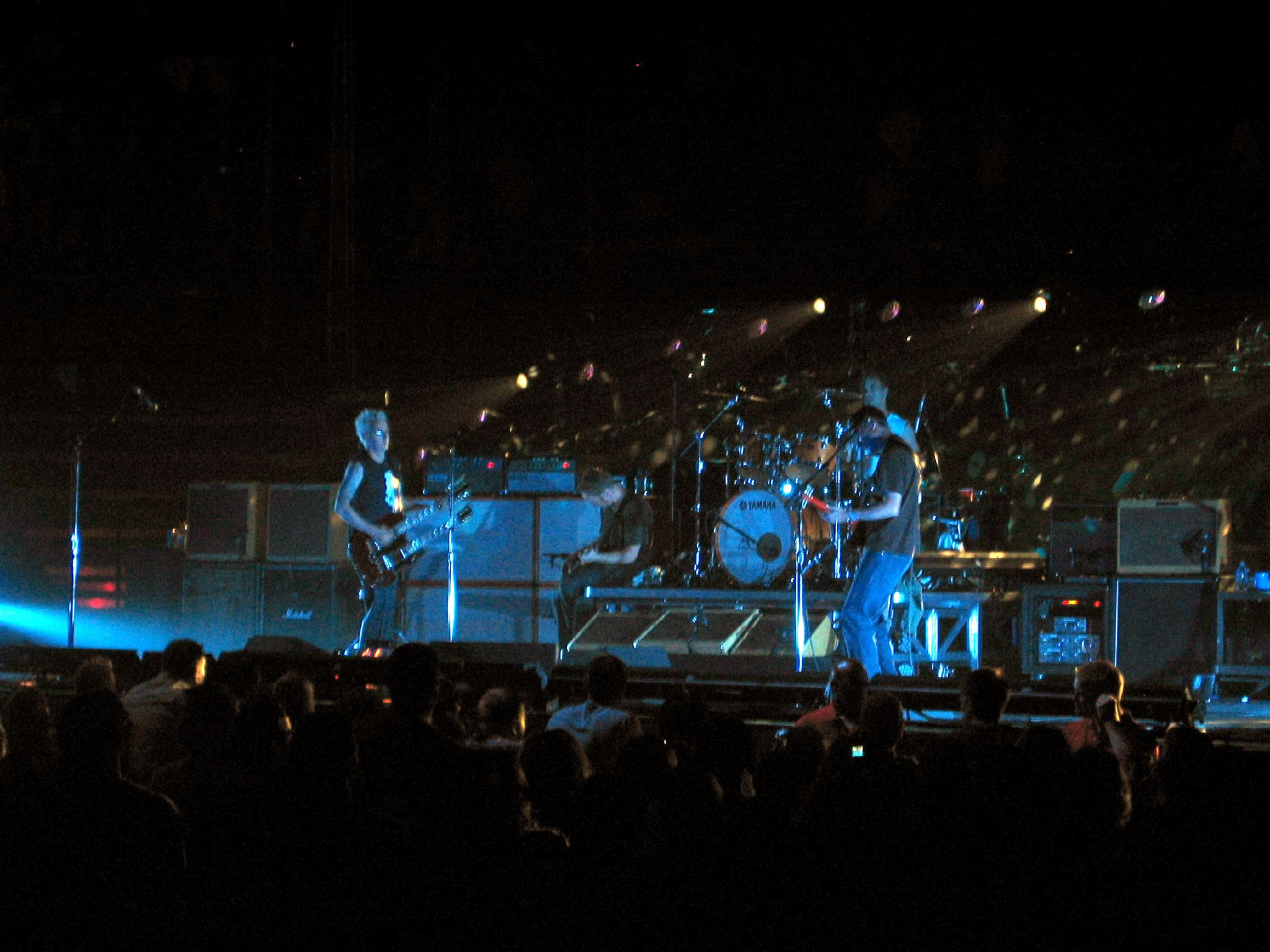
Pearl Jam in San Diego on July 7, 2006.

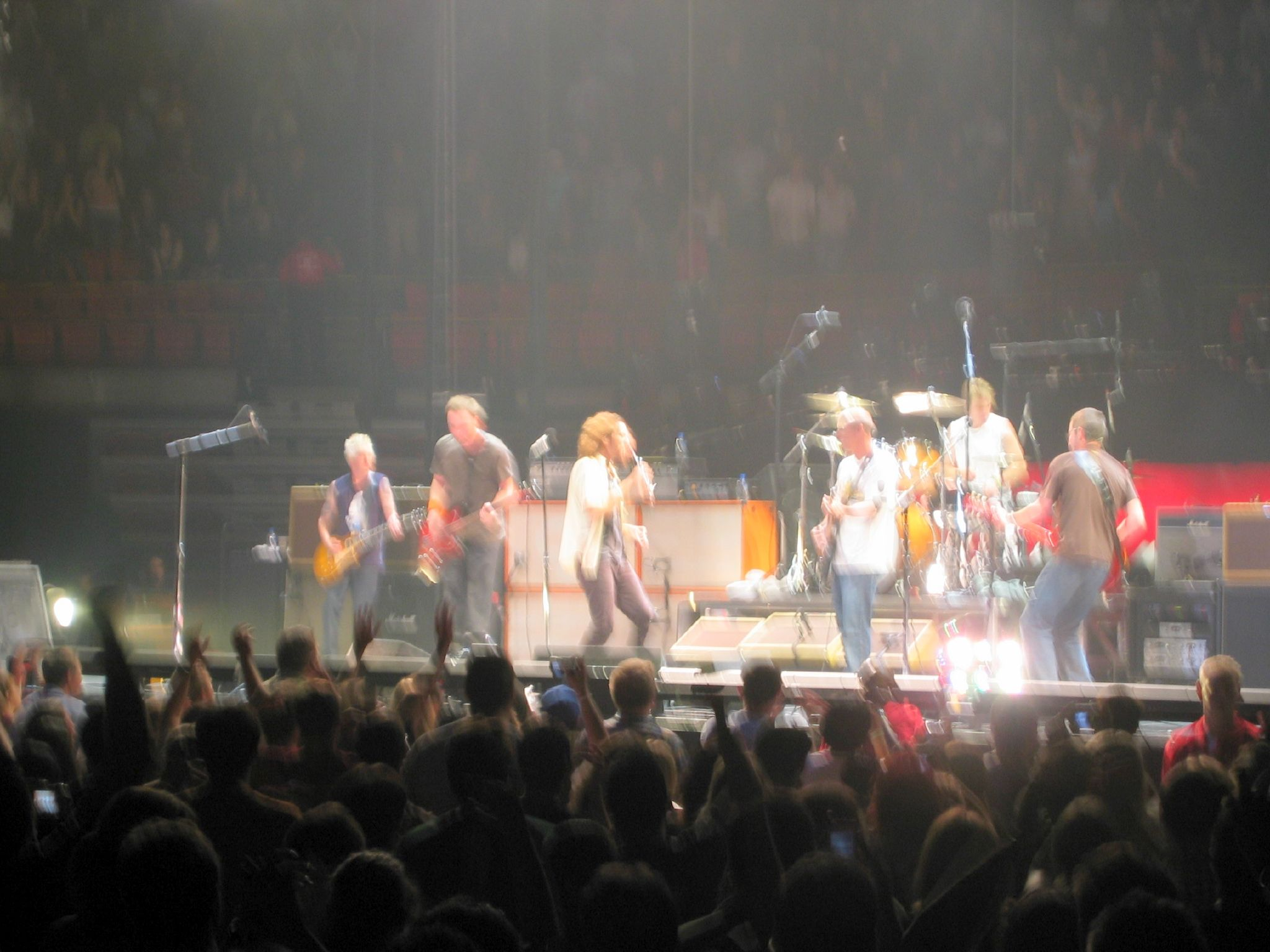
Pearl Jam in San Diego on July 7, 2006.

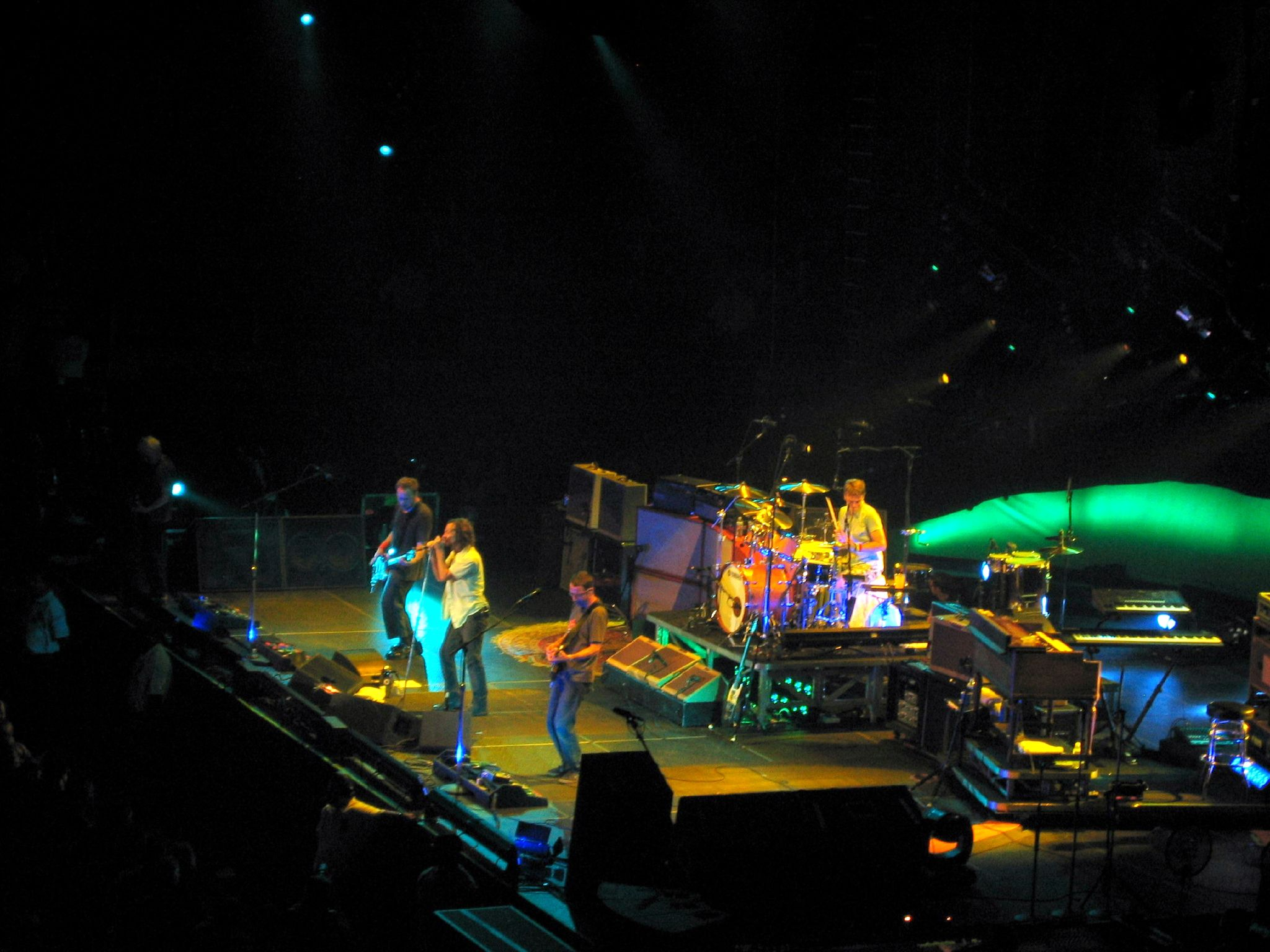
Pearl Jam in Inglewood, California on July 9, 2006.

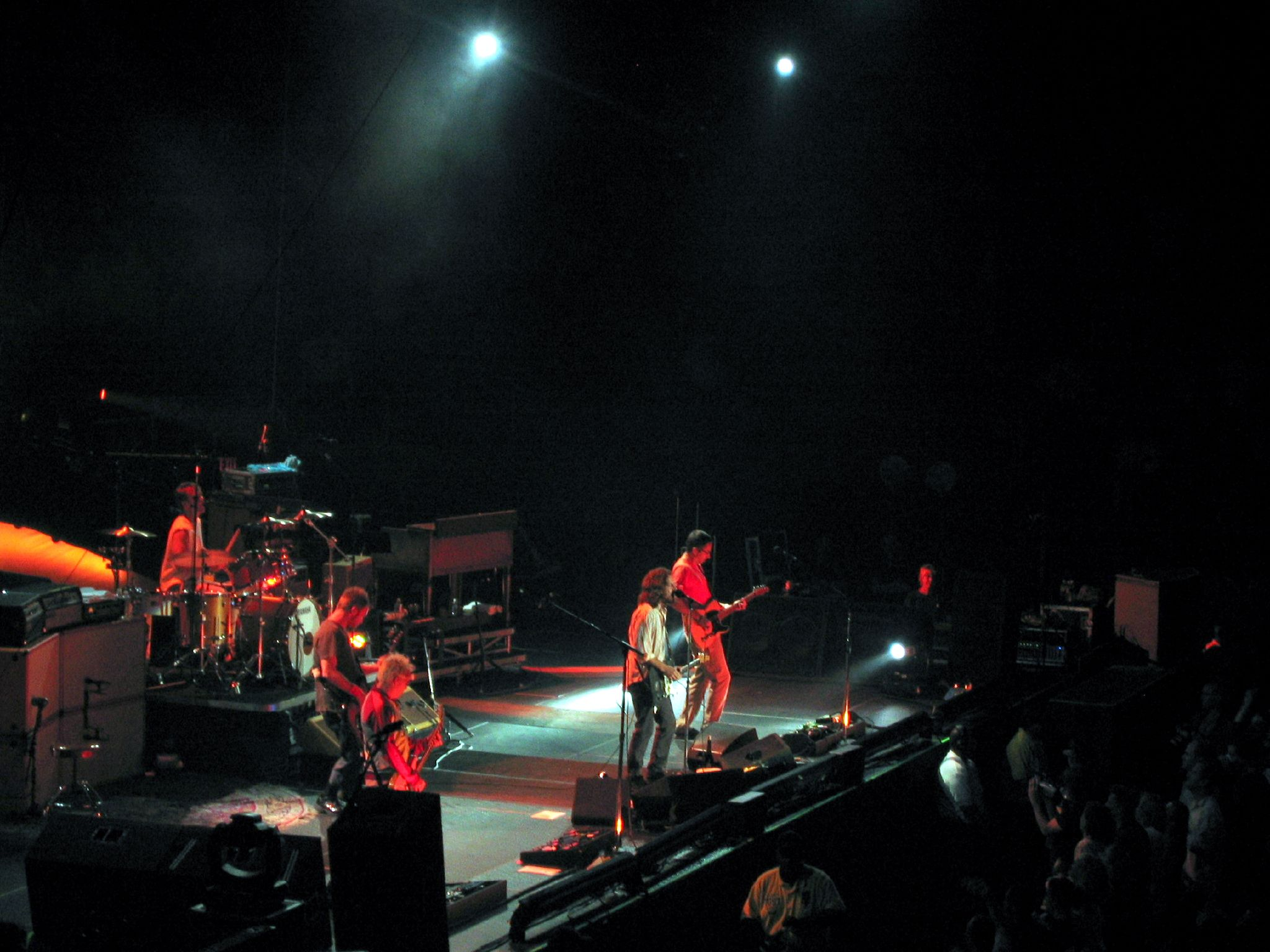
Pearl Jam in Inglewood, California on July 10, 2006.

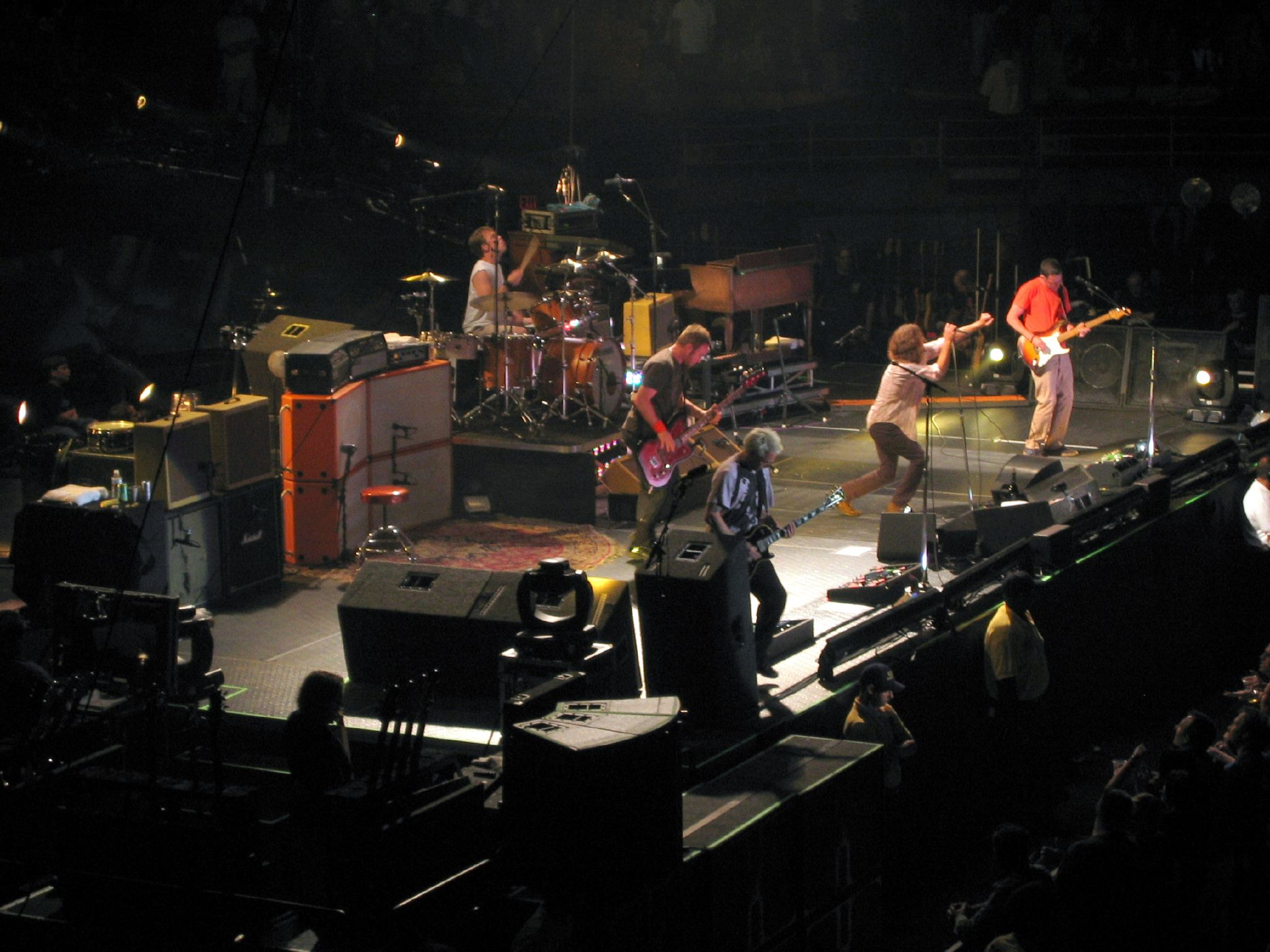
Pearl Jam in Inglewood, California on July 10, 2006.

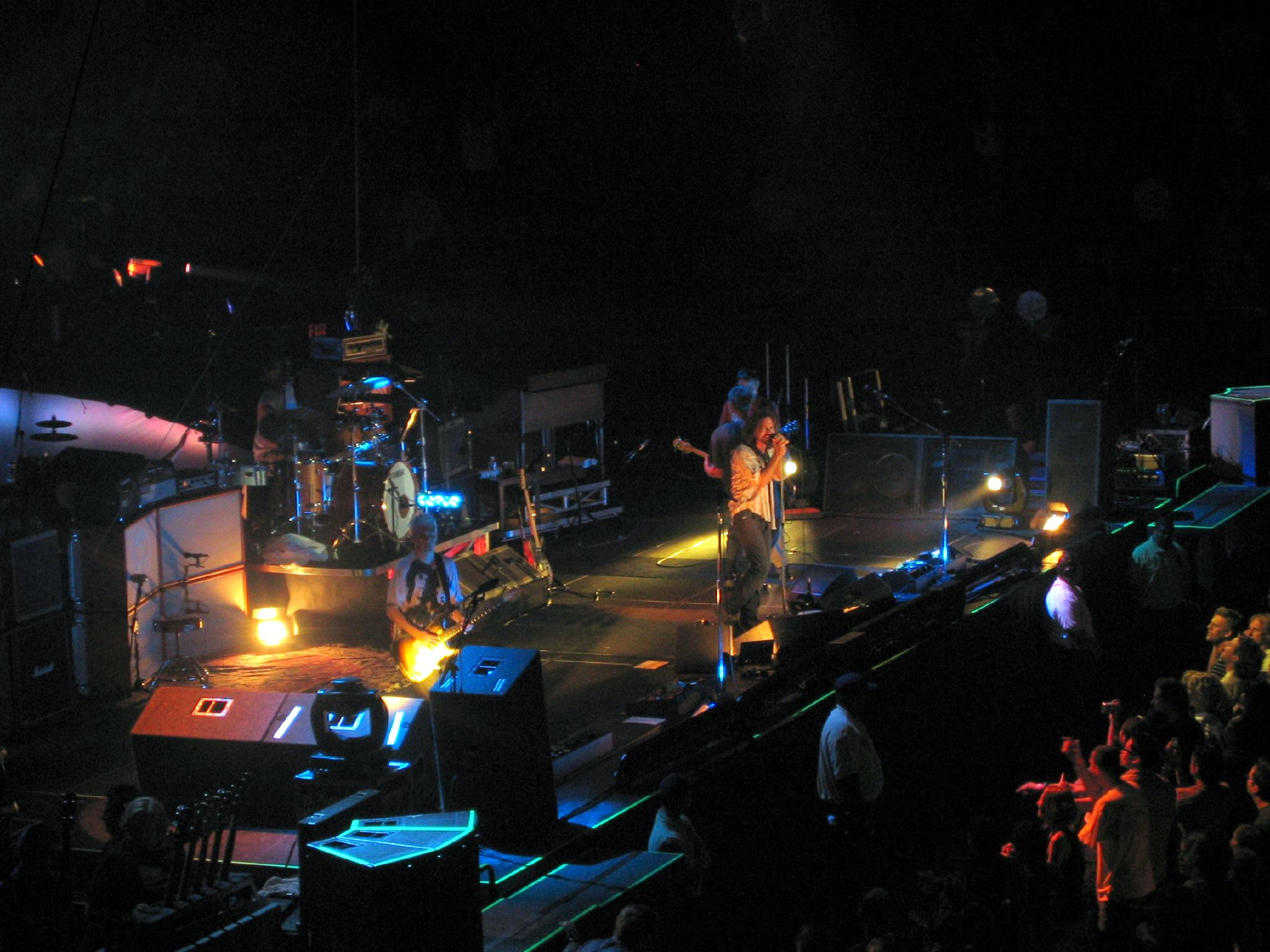
Pearl Jam in Inglewood, California on July 10, 2006.

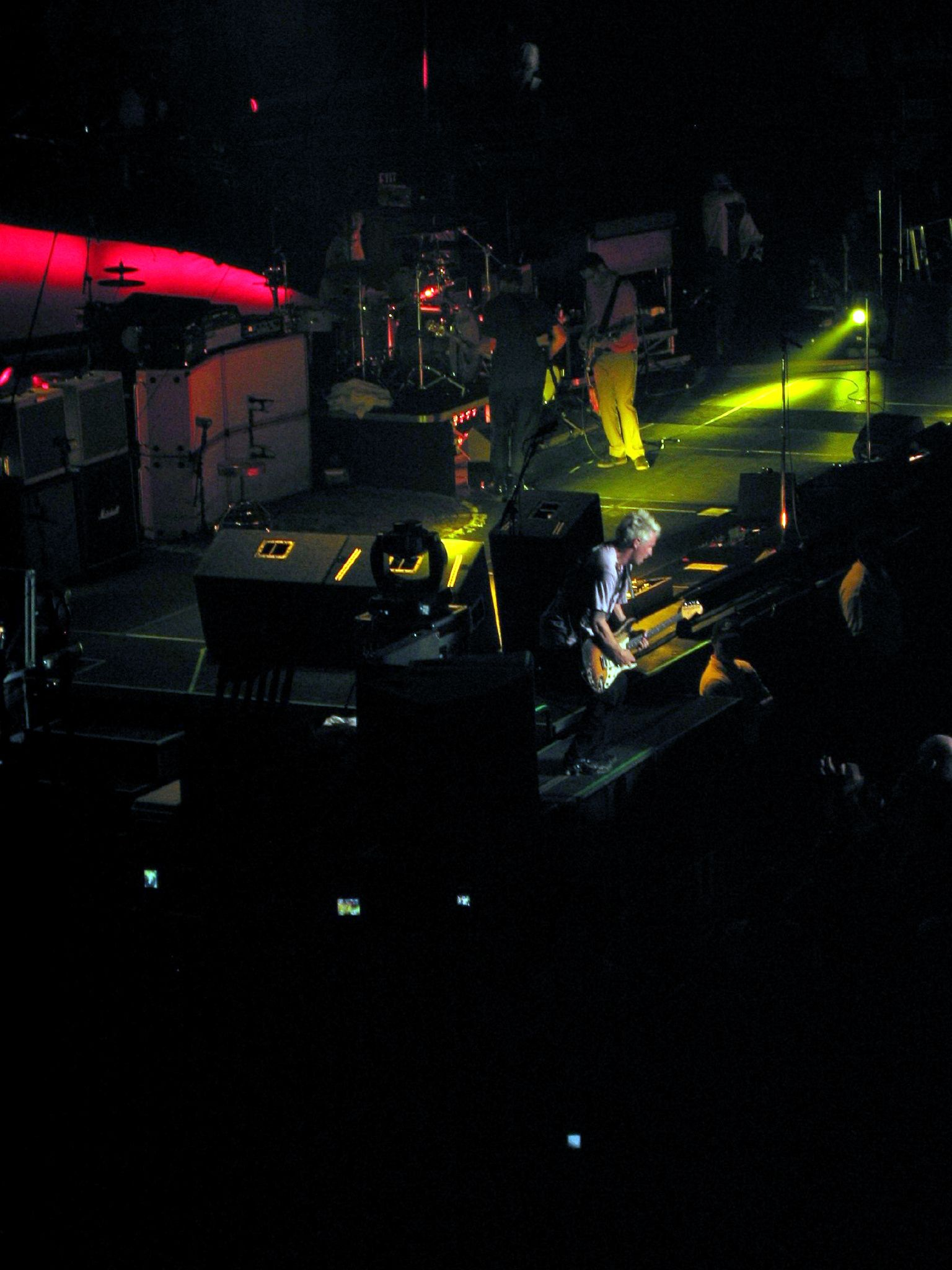
Pearl Jam in Inglewood, California on July 10, 2006.

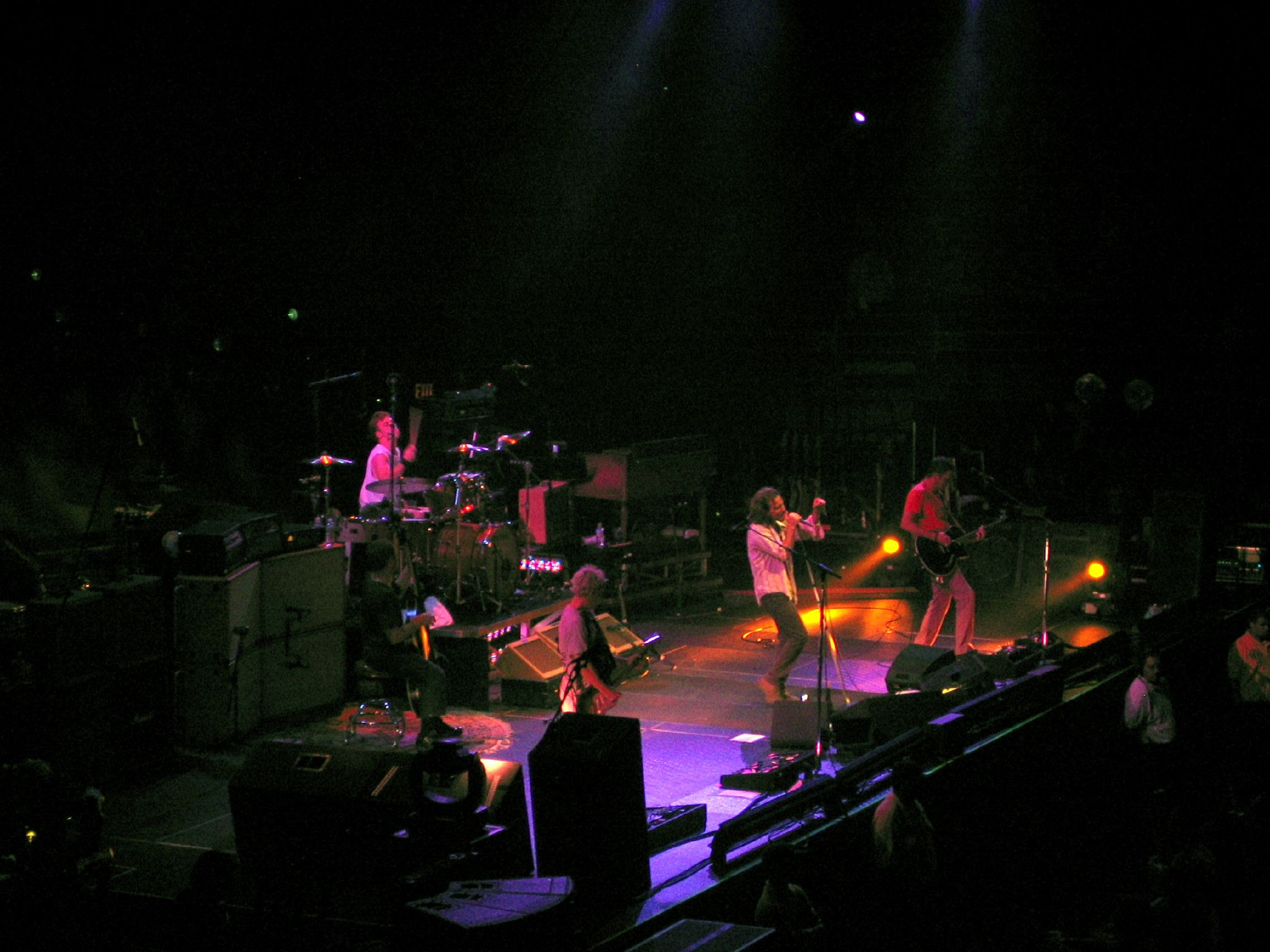
Pearl Jam in Inglewood, California on July 10, 2006.

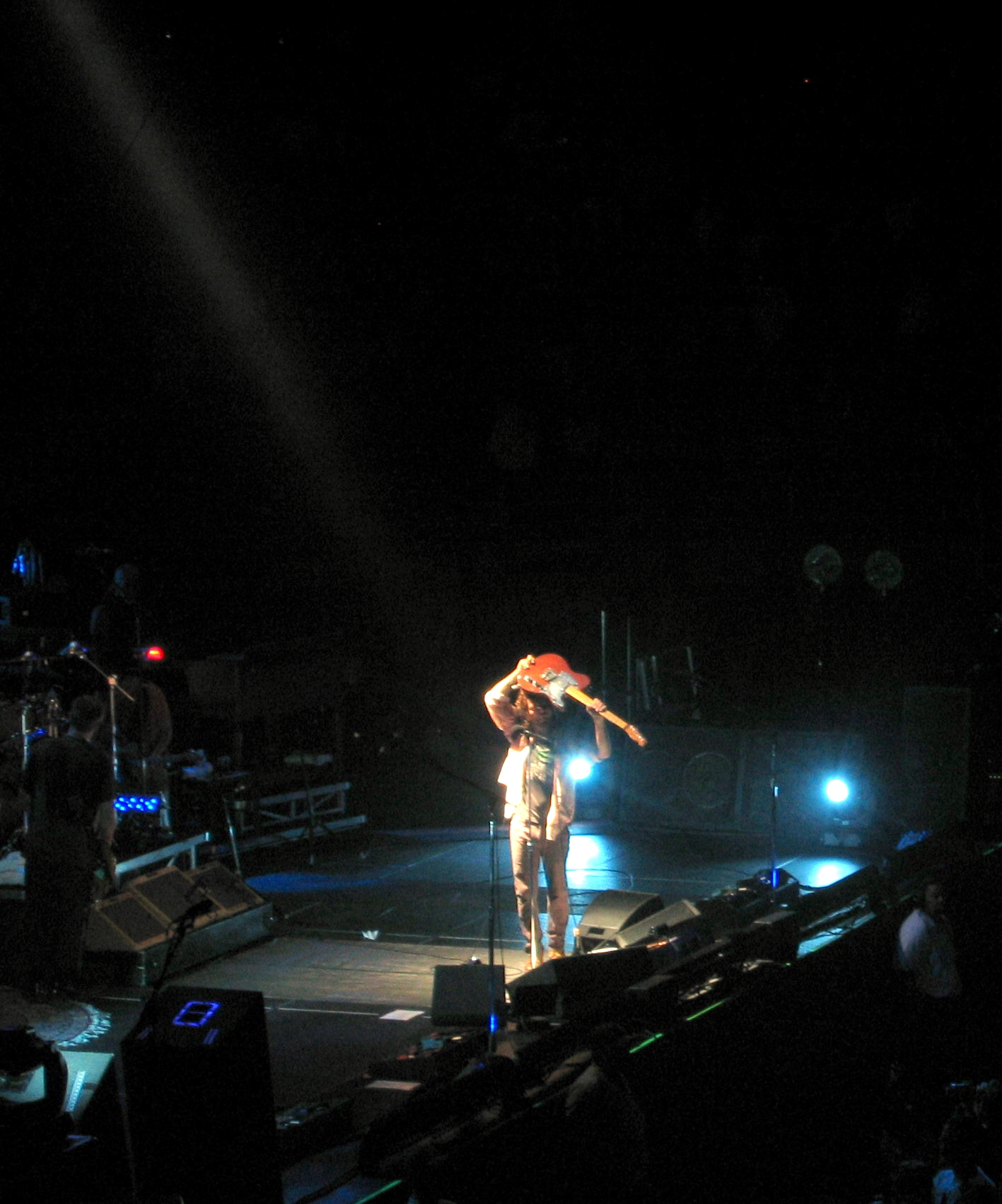
Pearl Jam in Inglewood, California on July 10, 2006.

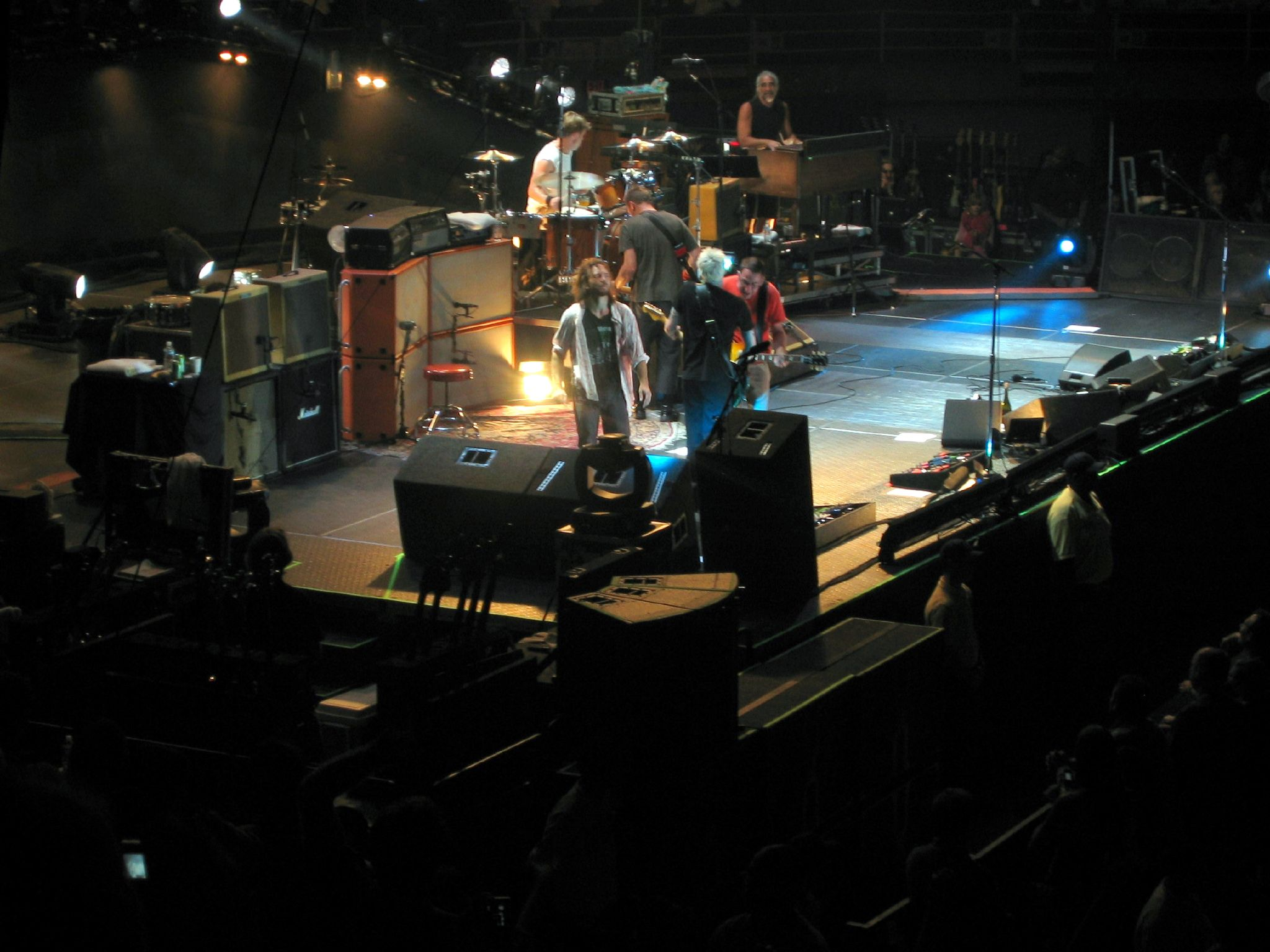
Pearl Jam in Inglewood, California on July 10, 2006.

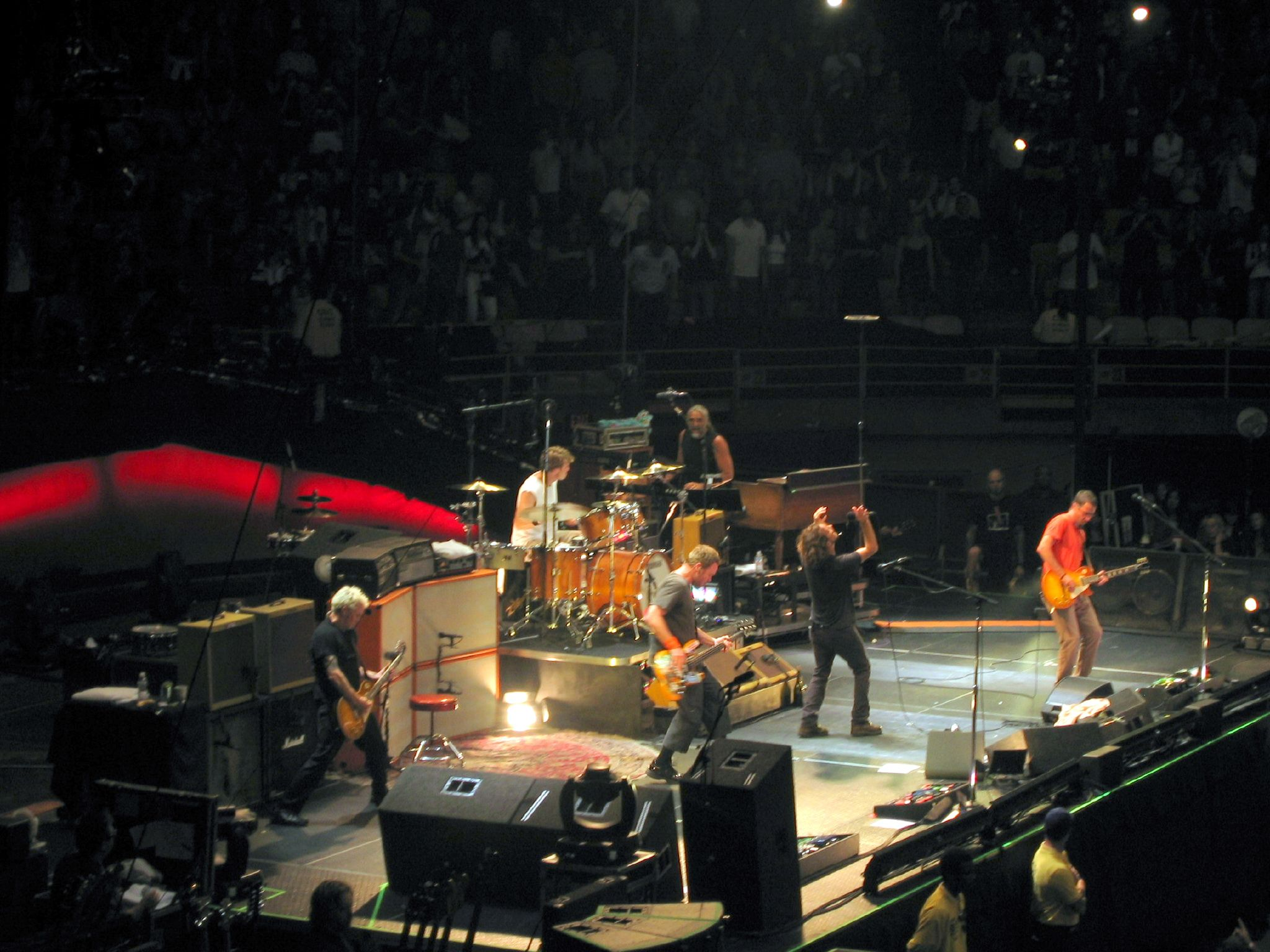
Pearl Jam in Inglewood, California on July 10, 2006.

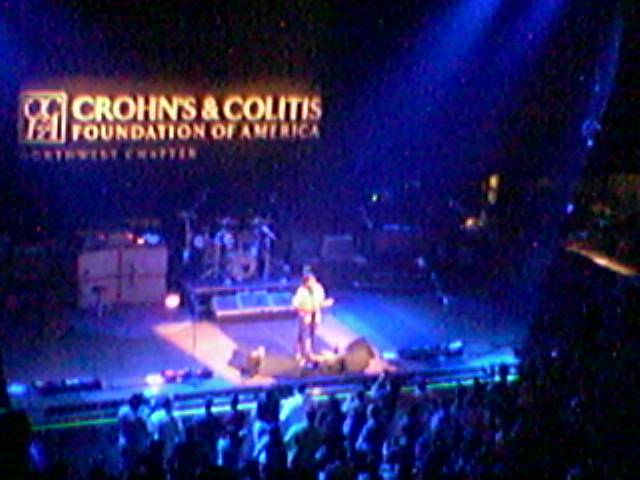
Eddie Vedder on stage with Pearl Jam in Portland, Oregon on July 20, 2006.

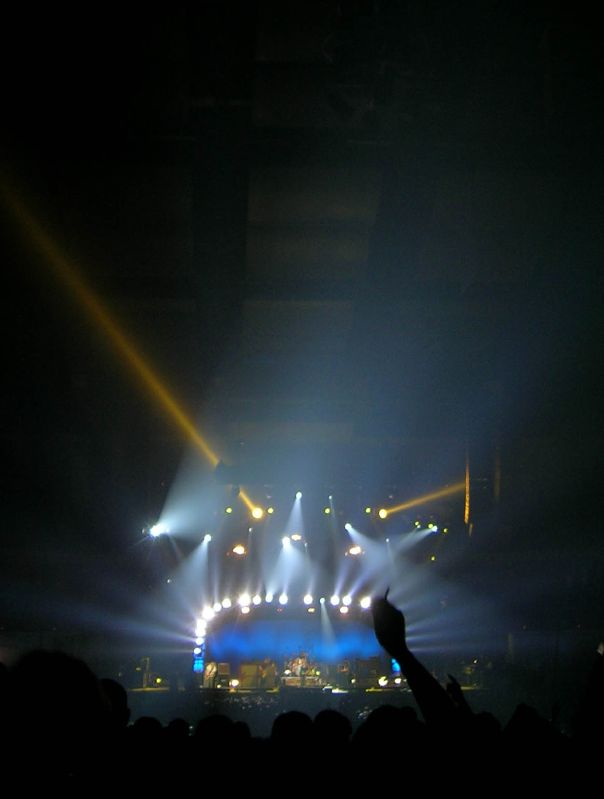
Pearl Jam in Madrid, Spain on September 7, 2006.

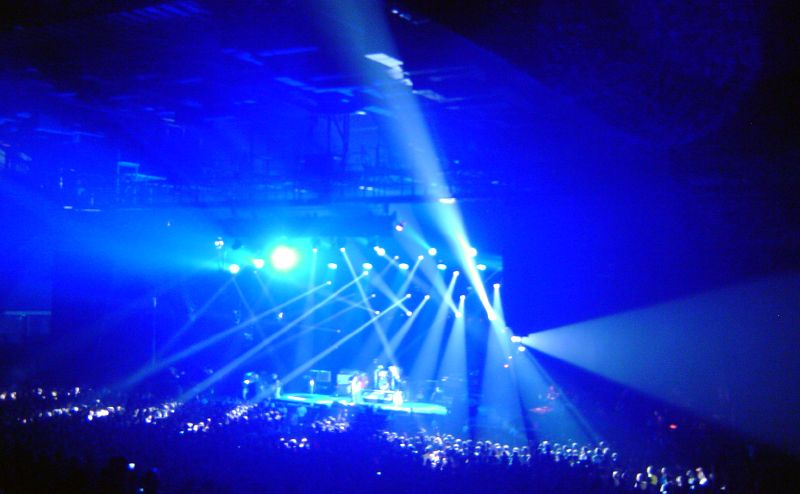
Pearl Jam in Marseille, France on September 9, 2006.

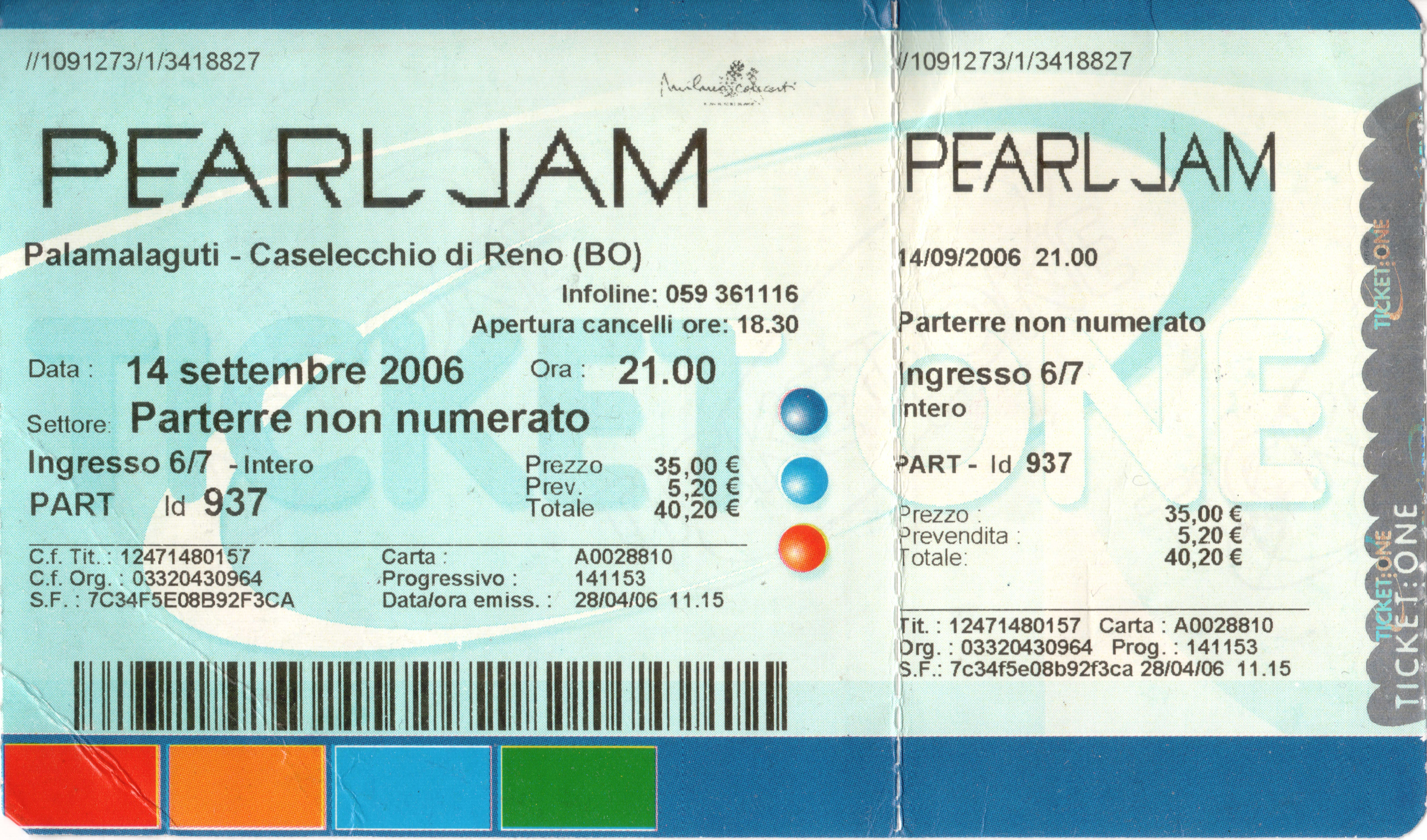
A ticket from the show in Bologna, Italy on September 14, 2006.

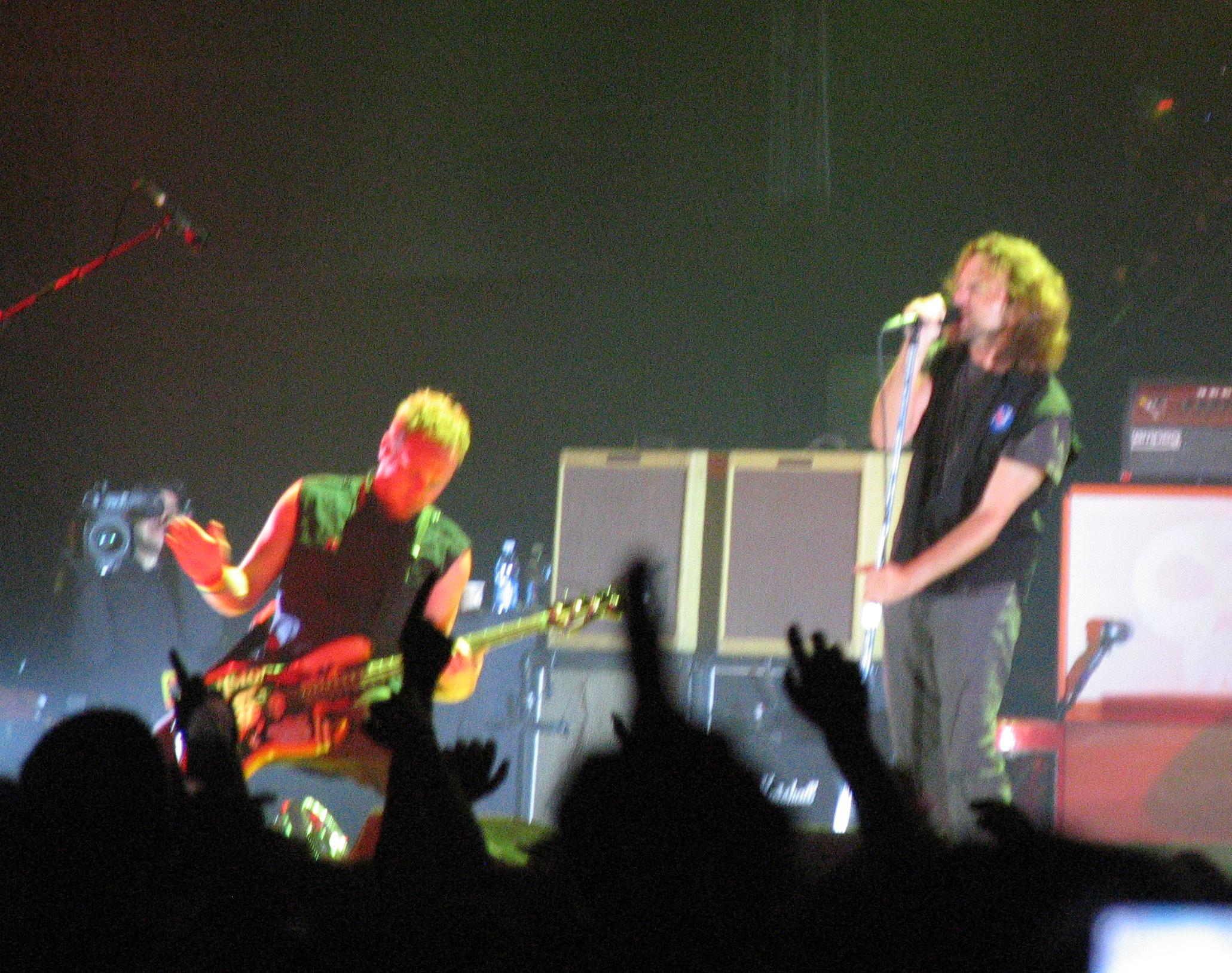
Pearl Jam in Bologna, Italy on September 14, 2006.

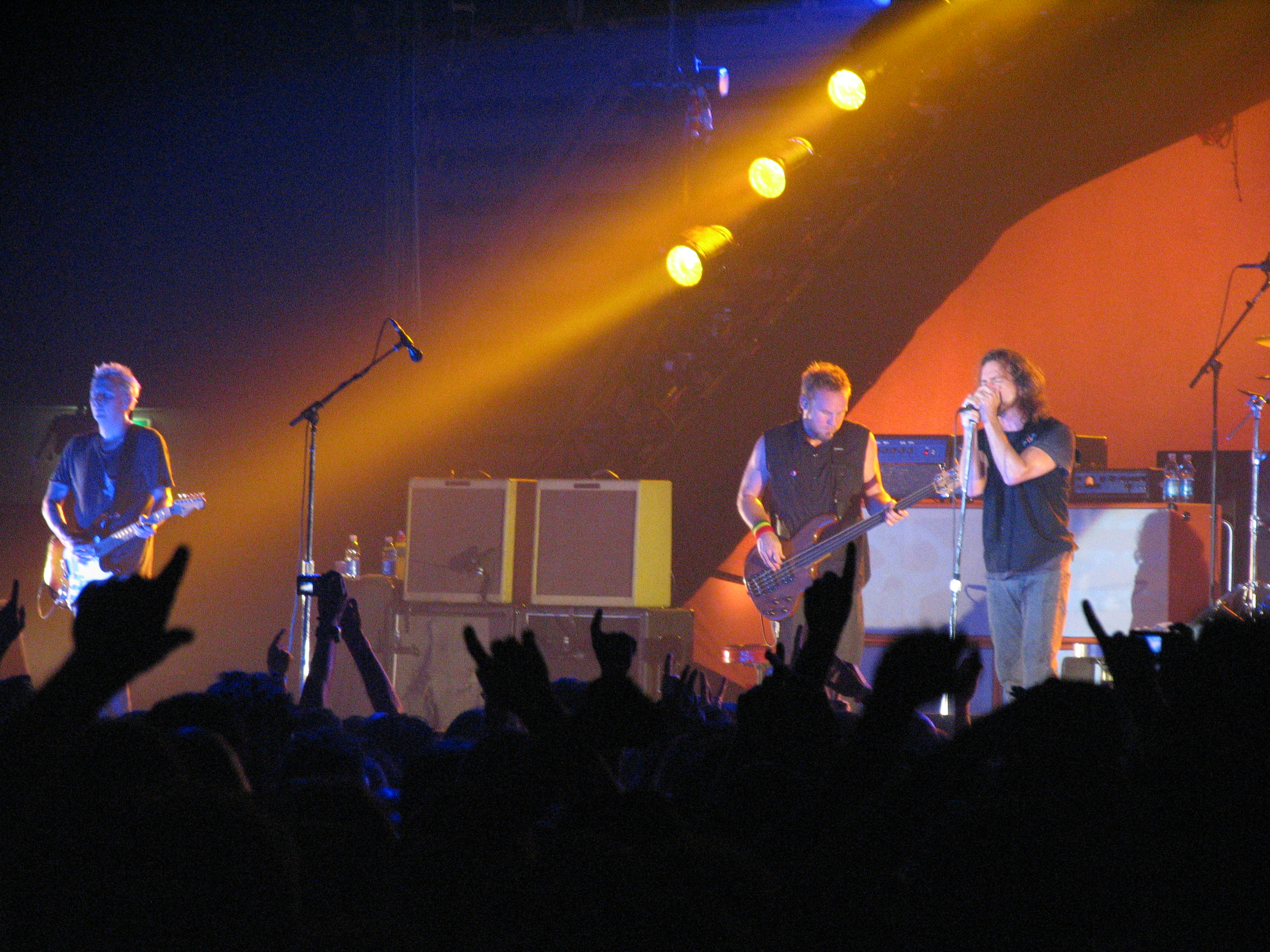
Pearl Jam in Bologna, Italy on September 14, 2006.

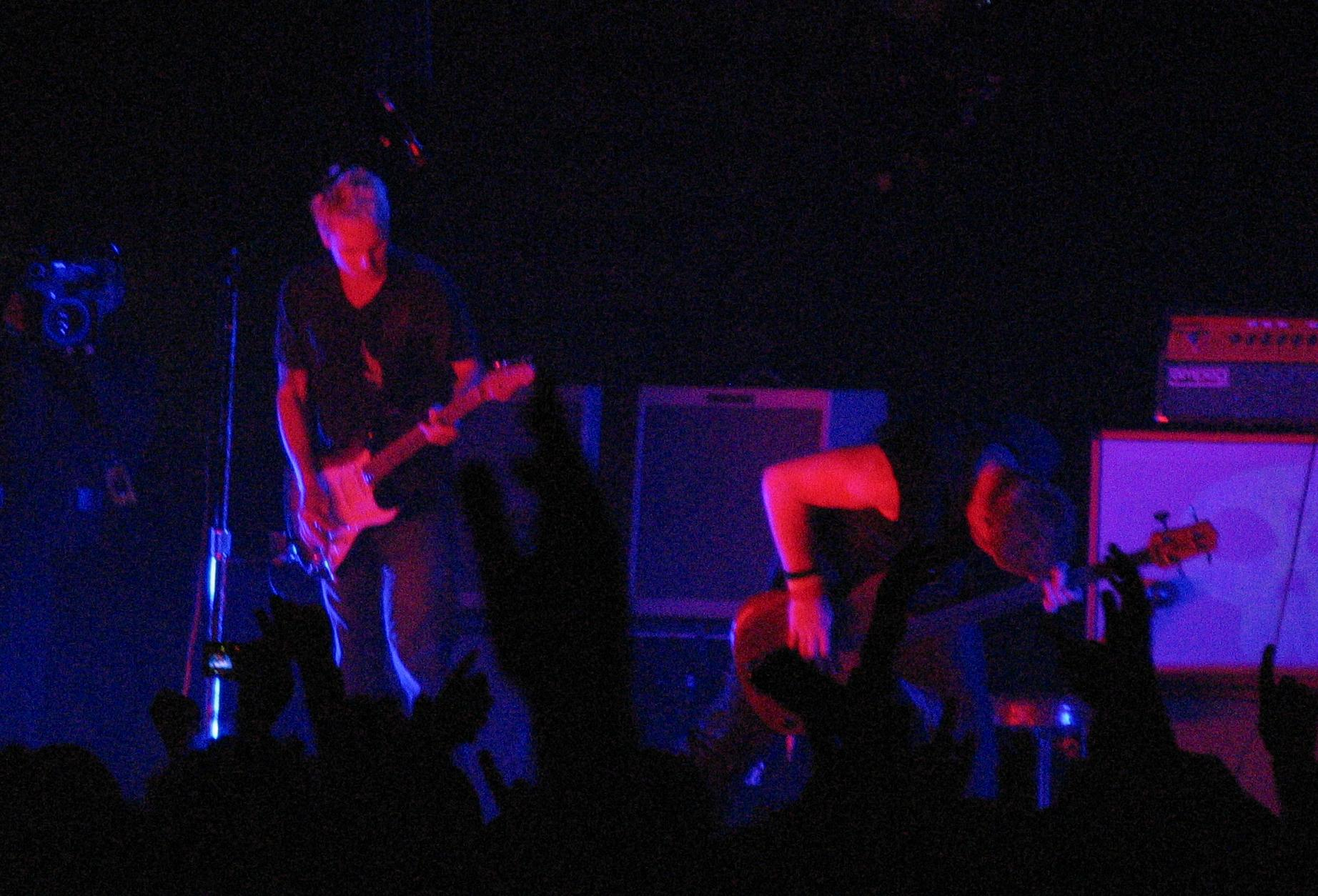
Pearl Jam in Bologna, Italy on September 14, 2006.

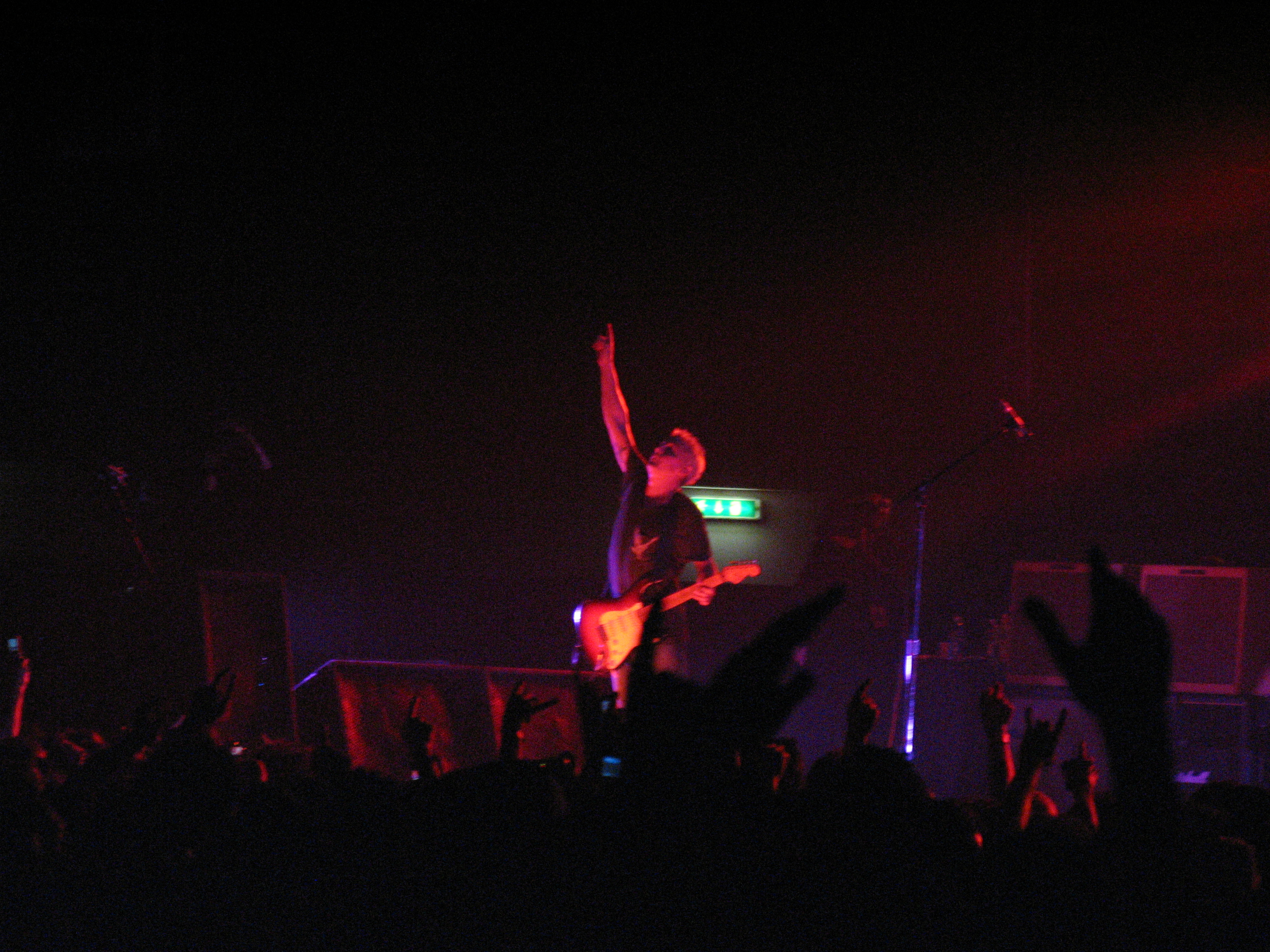
Mike McCready on stage with Pearl Jam in Bologna, Italy on September 14, 2006.

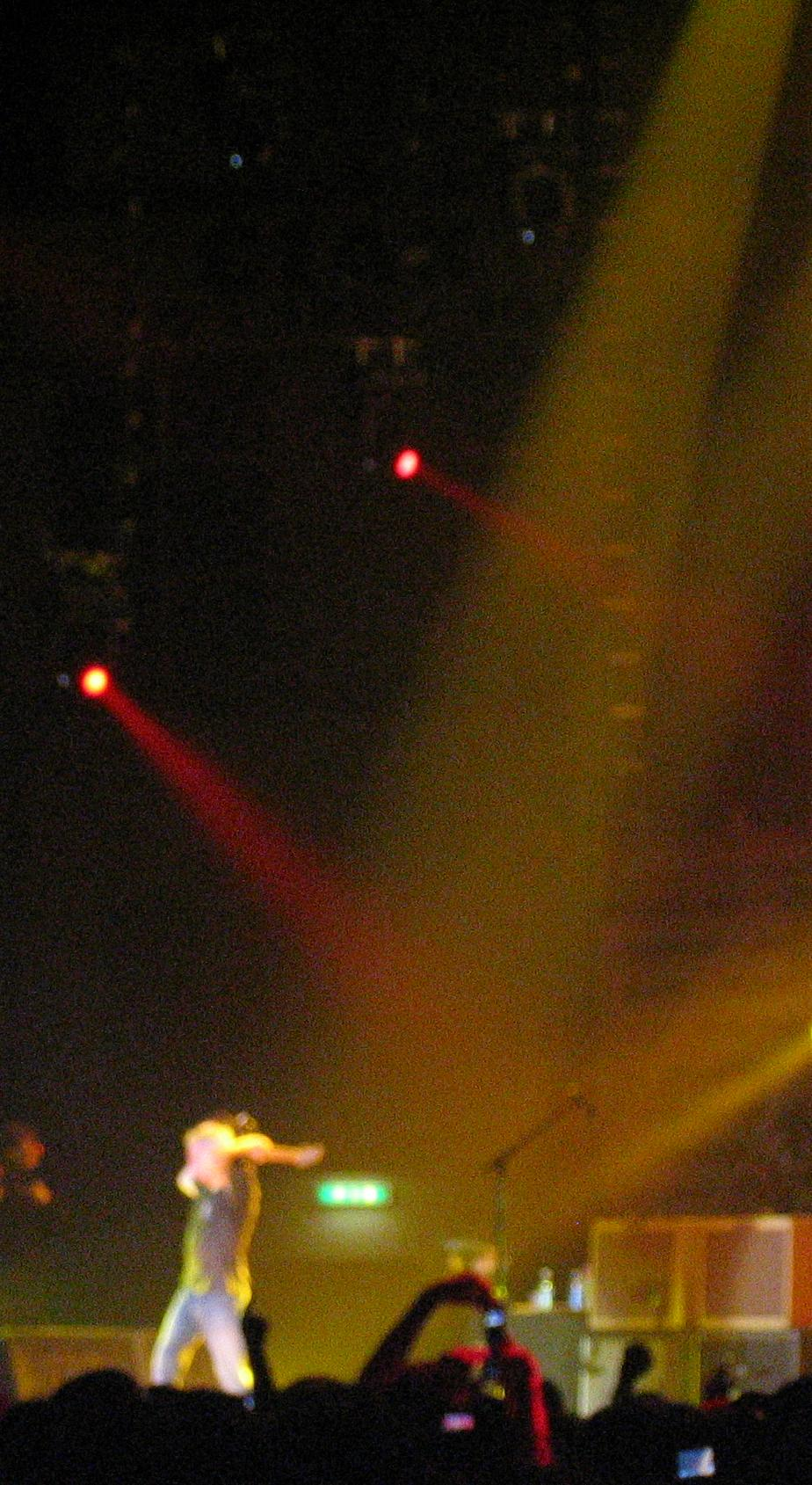
Mike McCready on stage with Pearl Jam in Bologna, Italy on September 14, 2006.

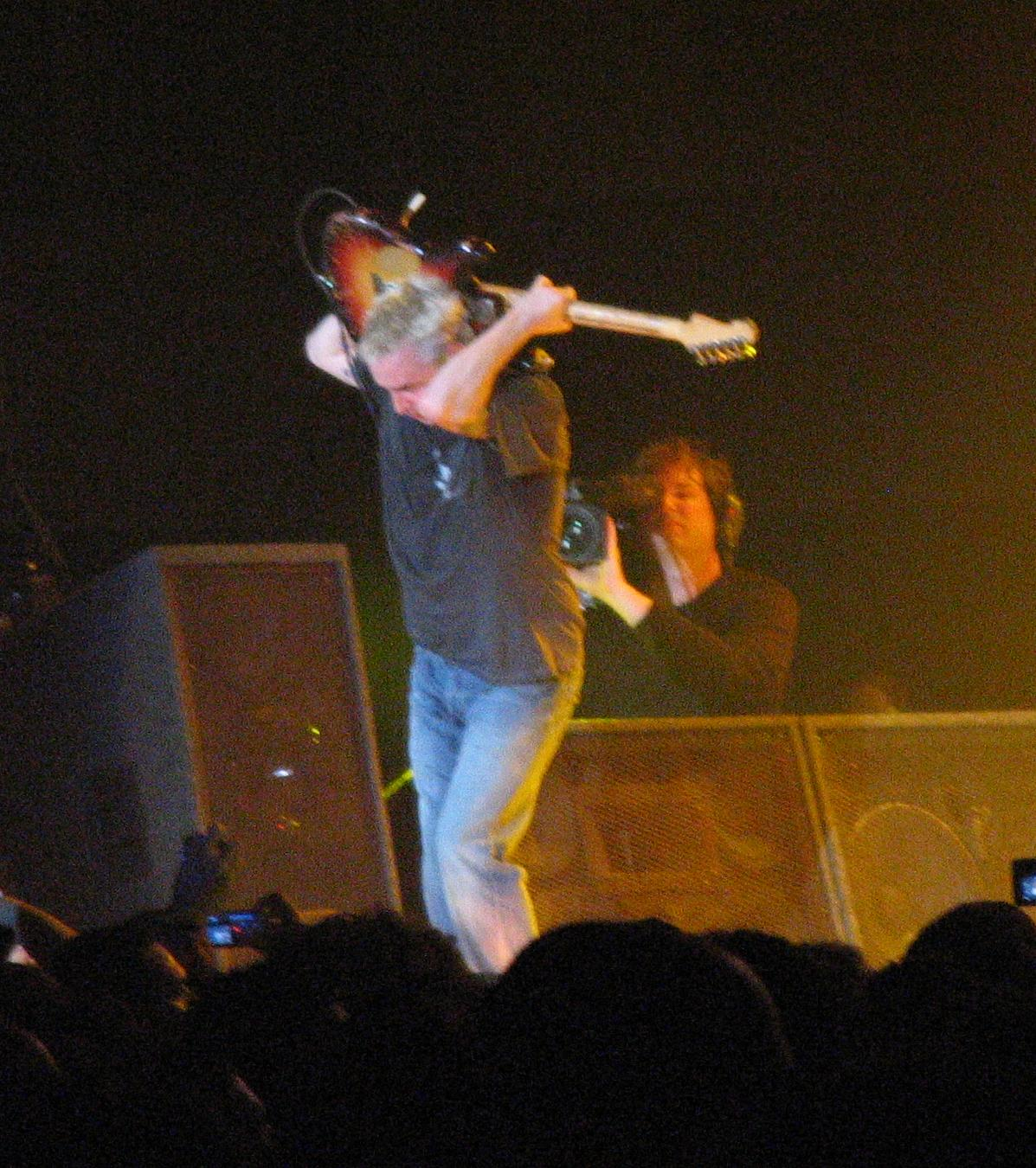
Mike McCready on stage with Pearl Jam in Bologna, Italy on September 14, 2006.

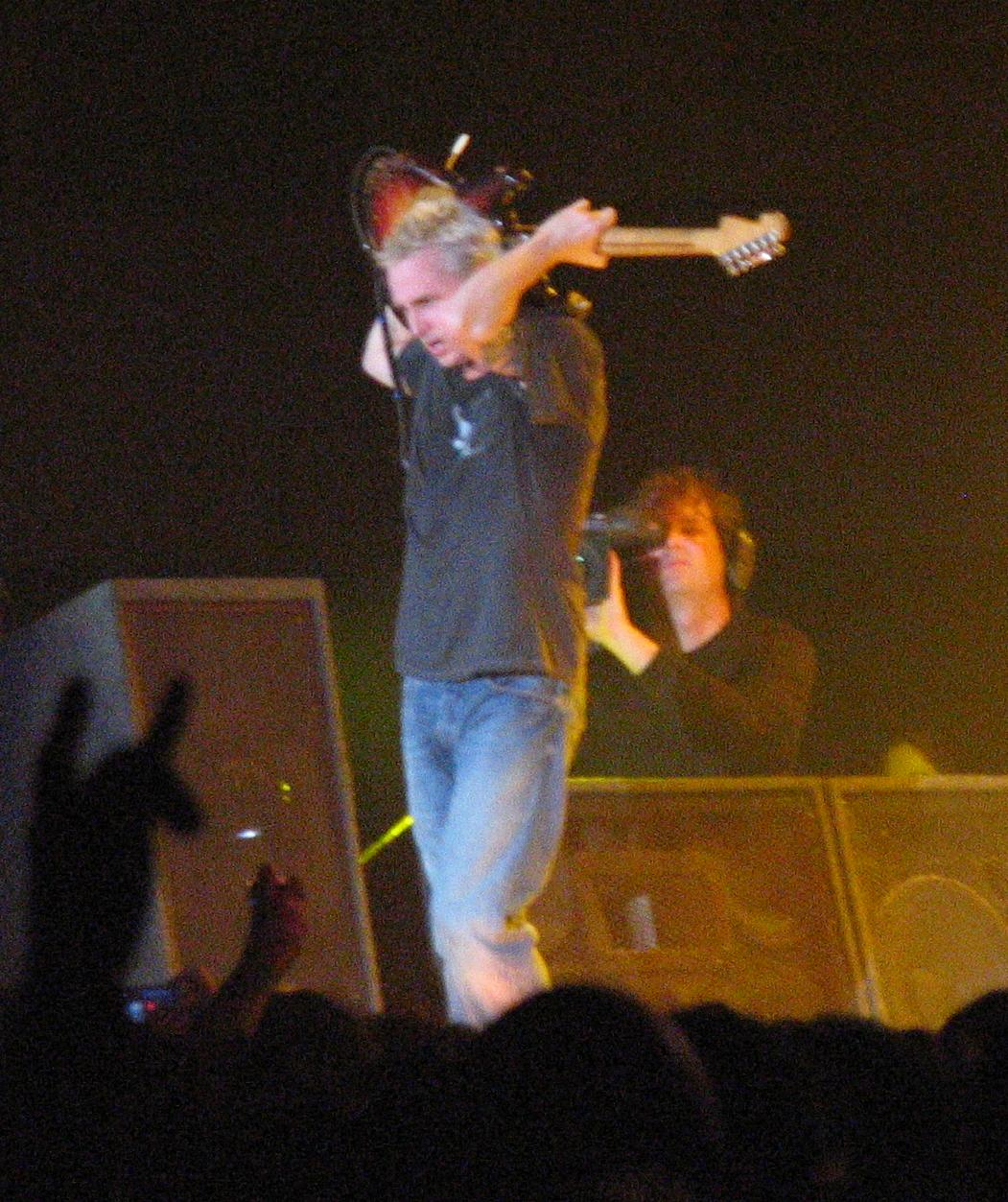
Mike McCready on stage with Pearl Jam in Bologna, Italy on September 14, 2006.

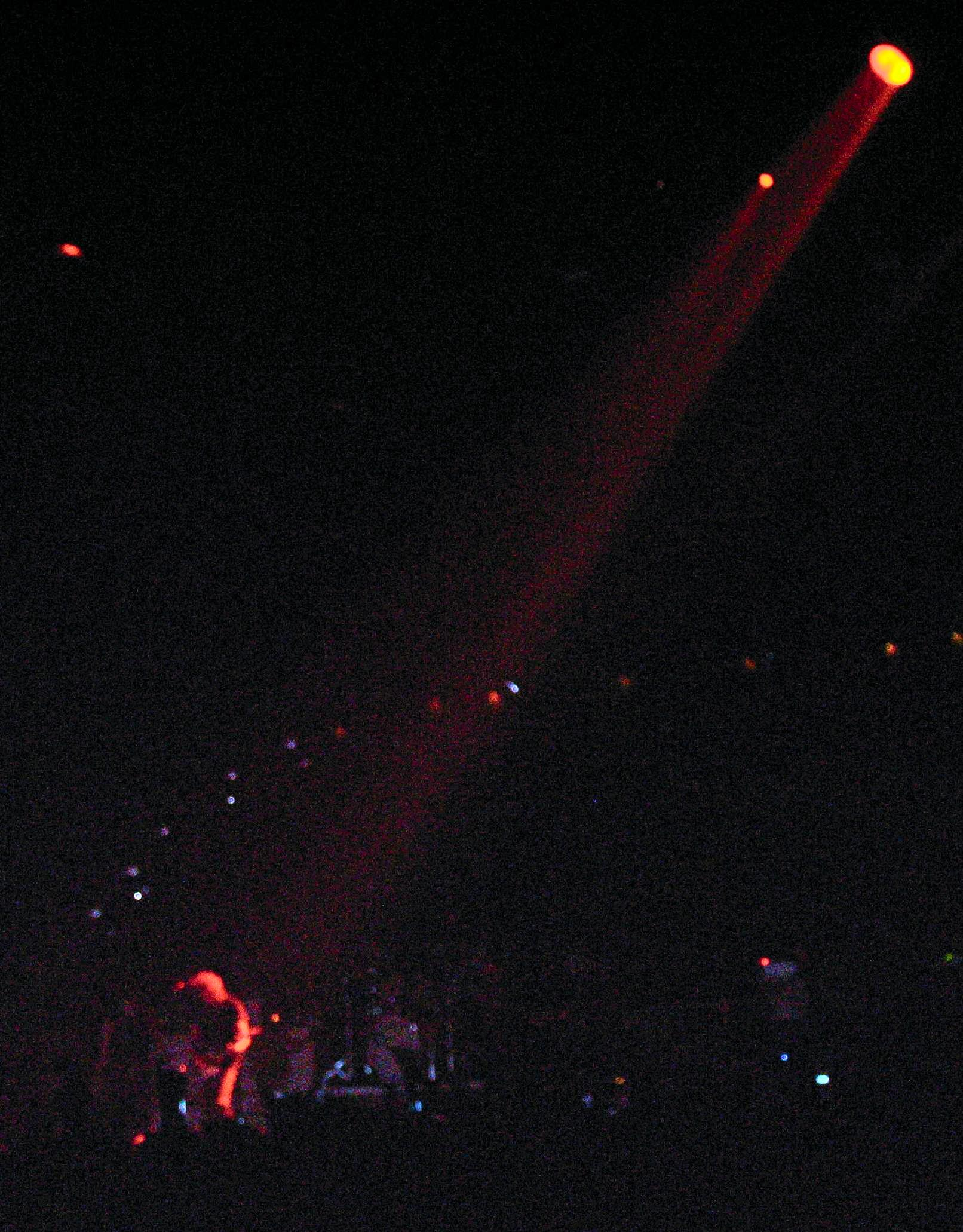
Pearl Jam in Bologna, Italy on September 14, 2006.

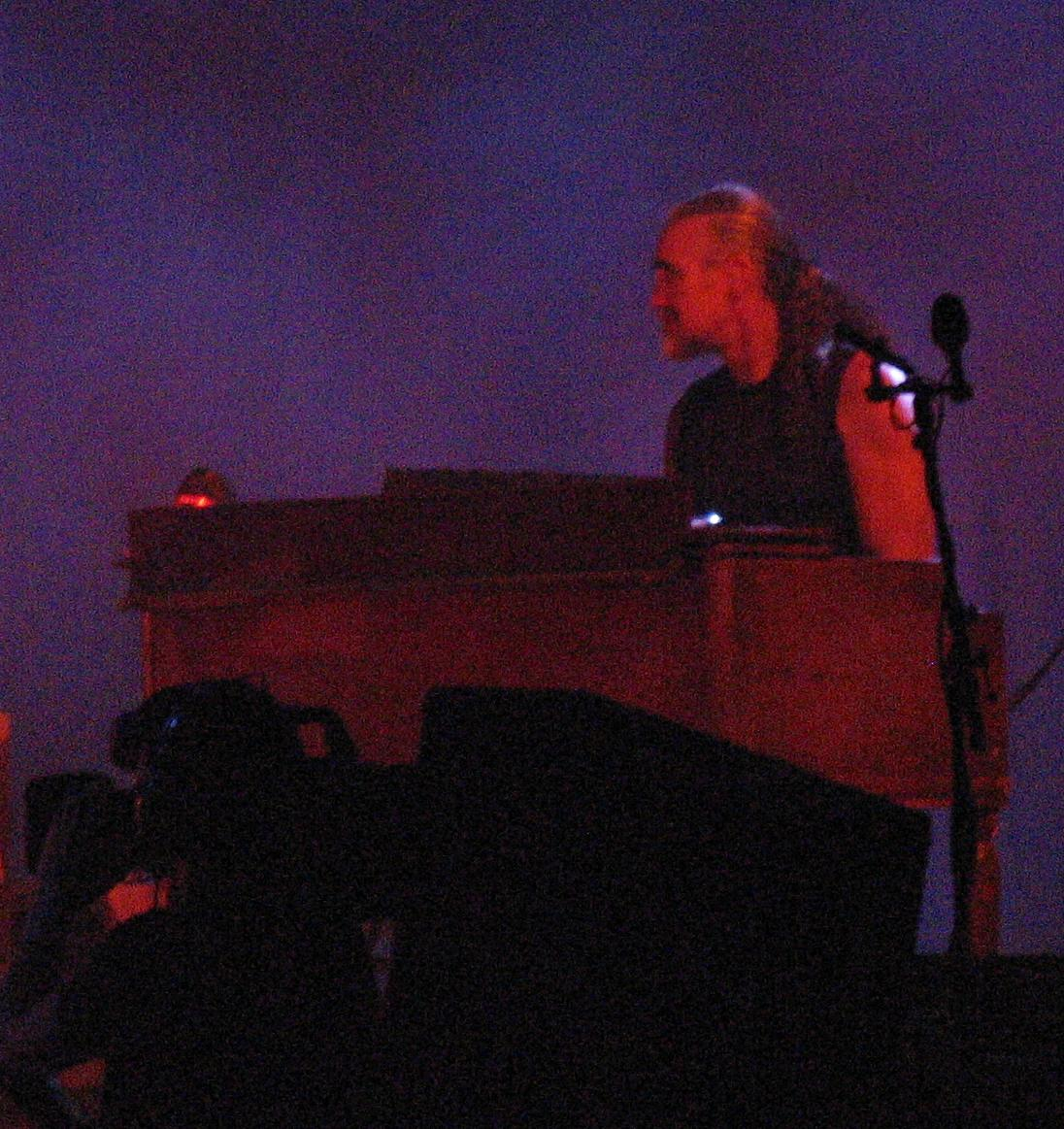
Boom Gaspar on stage with Pearl Jam in Bologna, Italy on September 14, 2006.

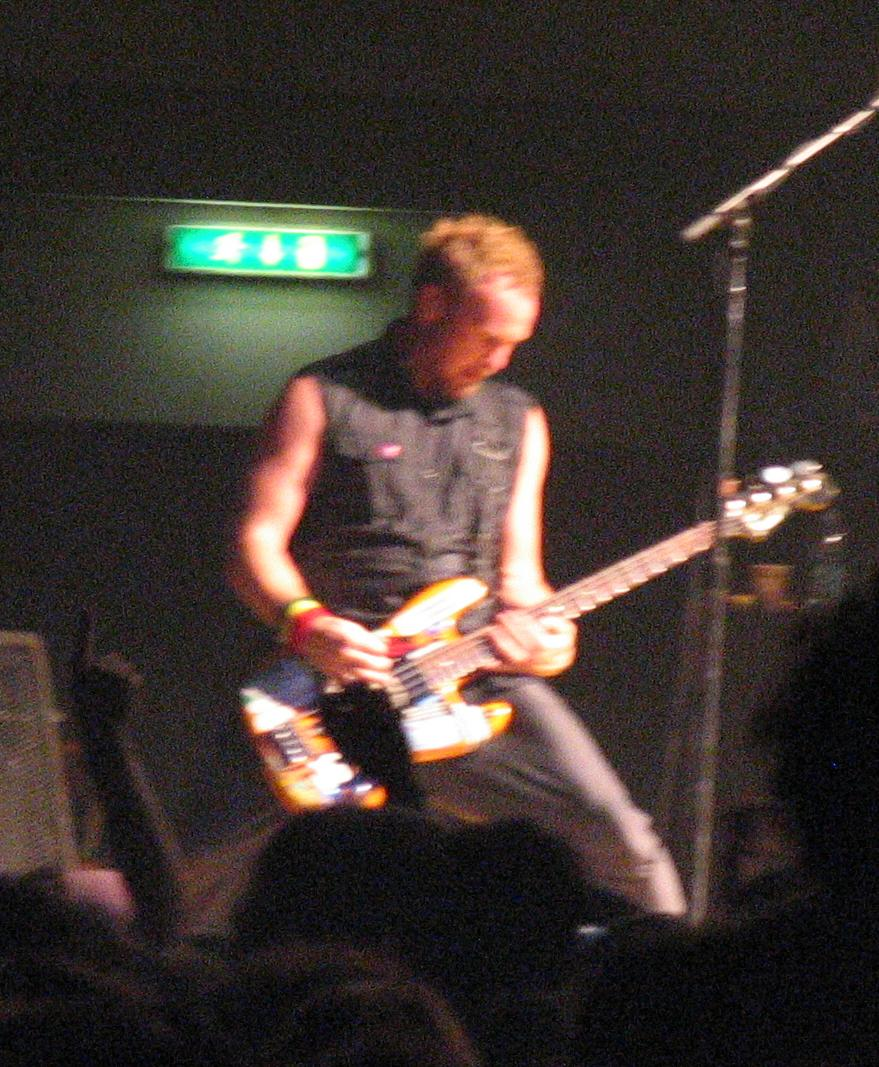
Jeff Ament on stage with Pearl Jam in Bologna, Italy on September 14, 2006.

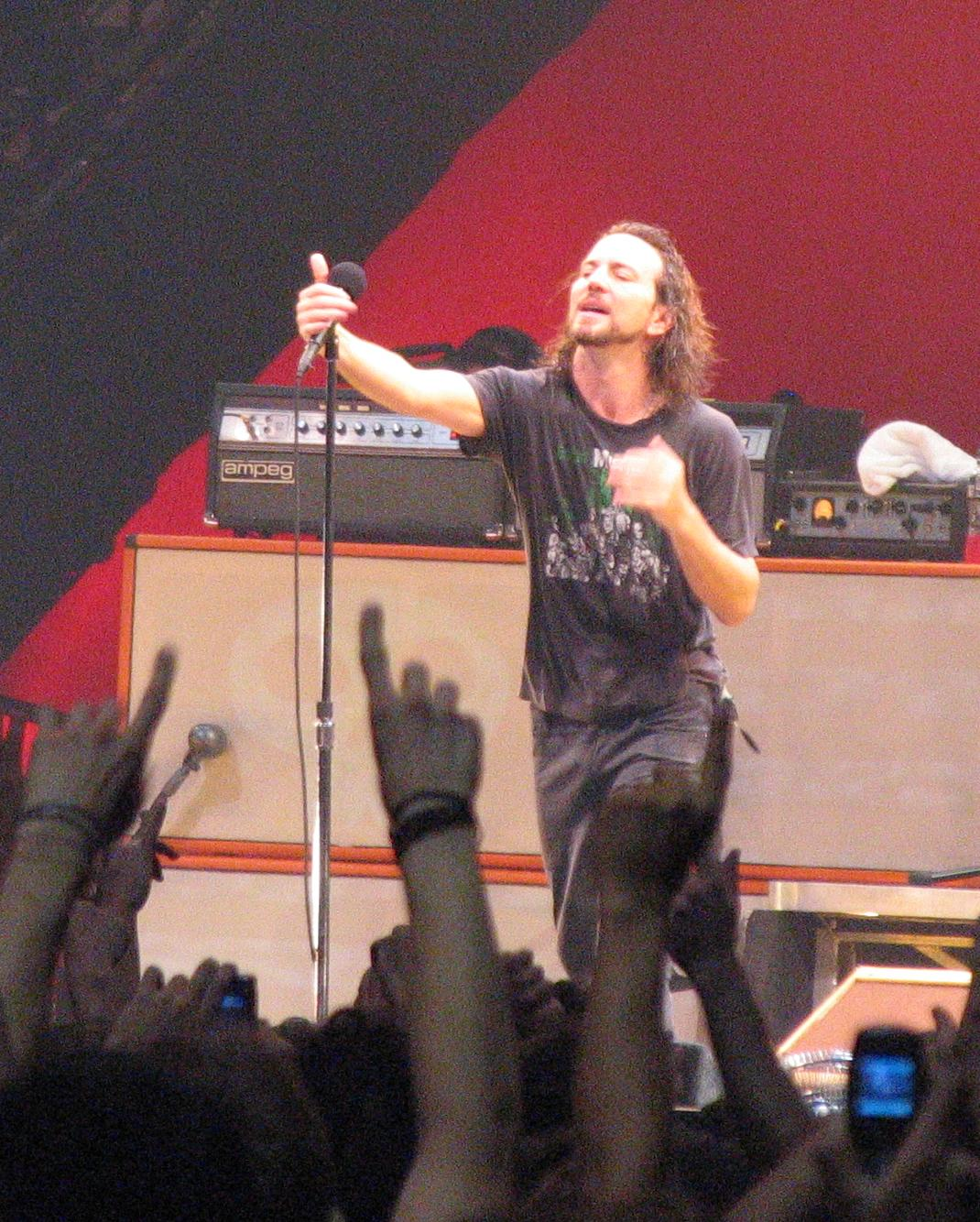
Eddie Vedder on stage with Pearl Jam in Bologna, Italy on September 14, 2006.

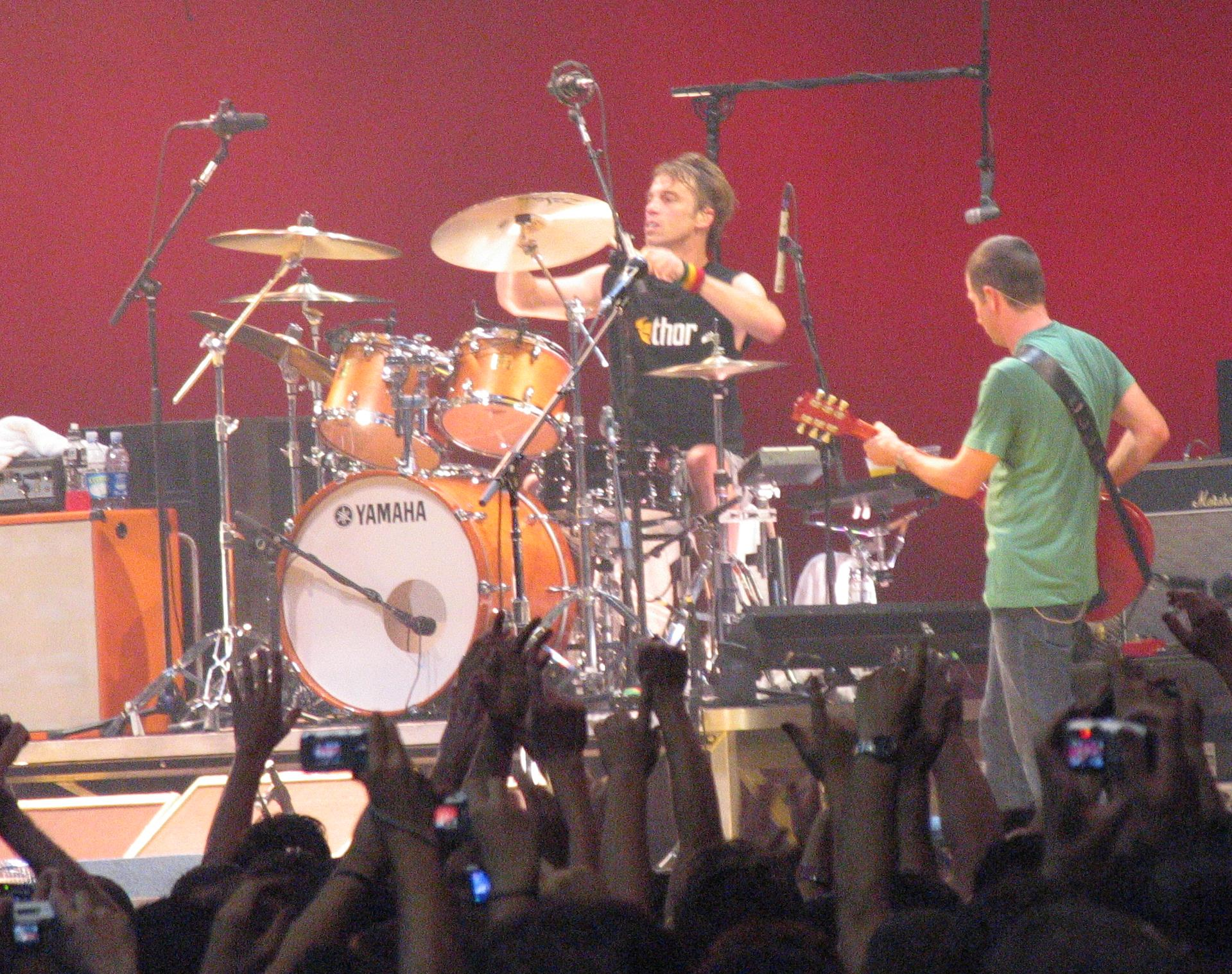
Pearl Jam in Bologna, Italy on September 14, 2006.

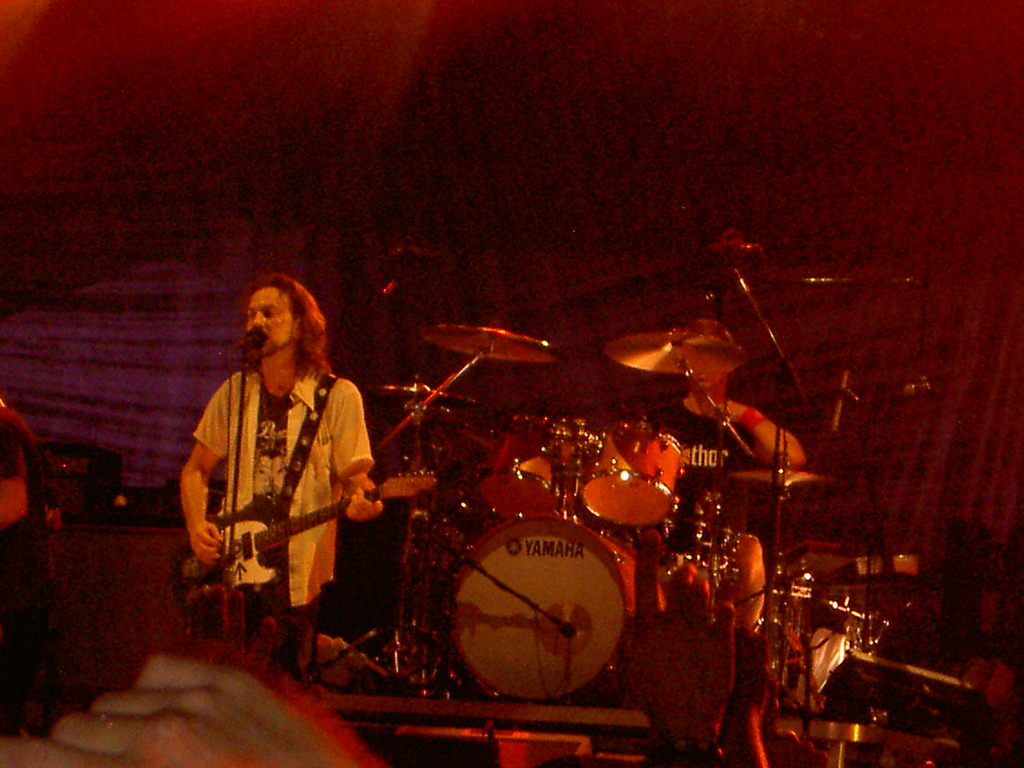
Pearl Jam in Pistoia, Italy on September 20, 2006.

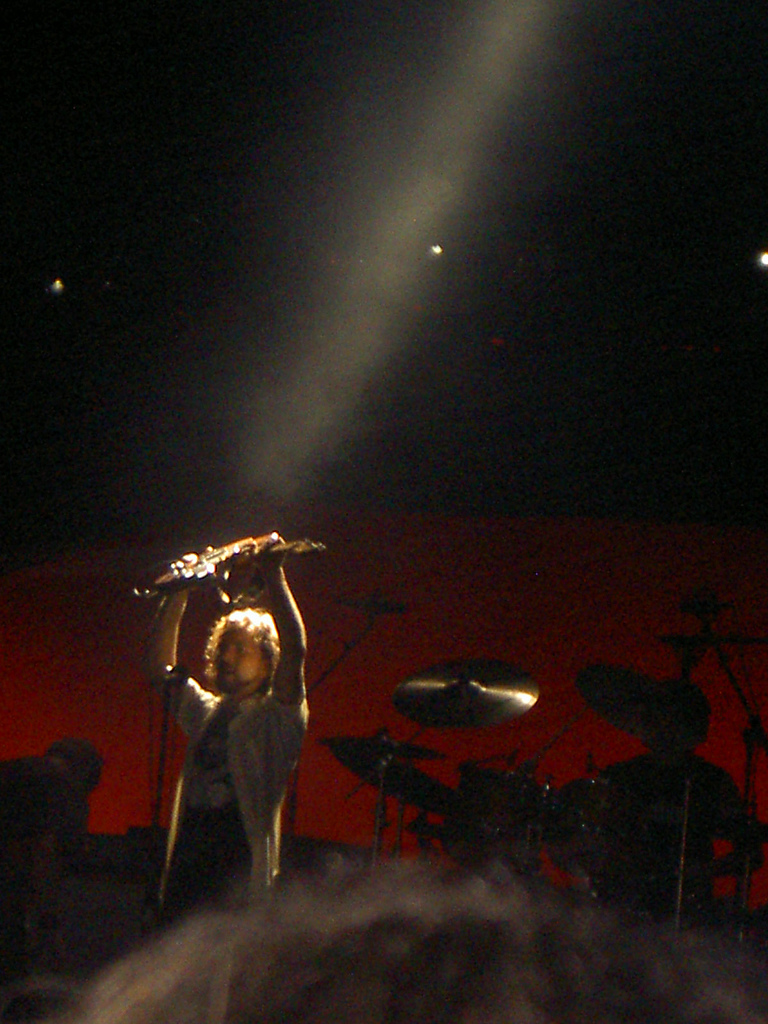
Pearl Jam in Pistoia, Italy on September 20, 2006.

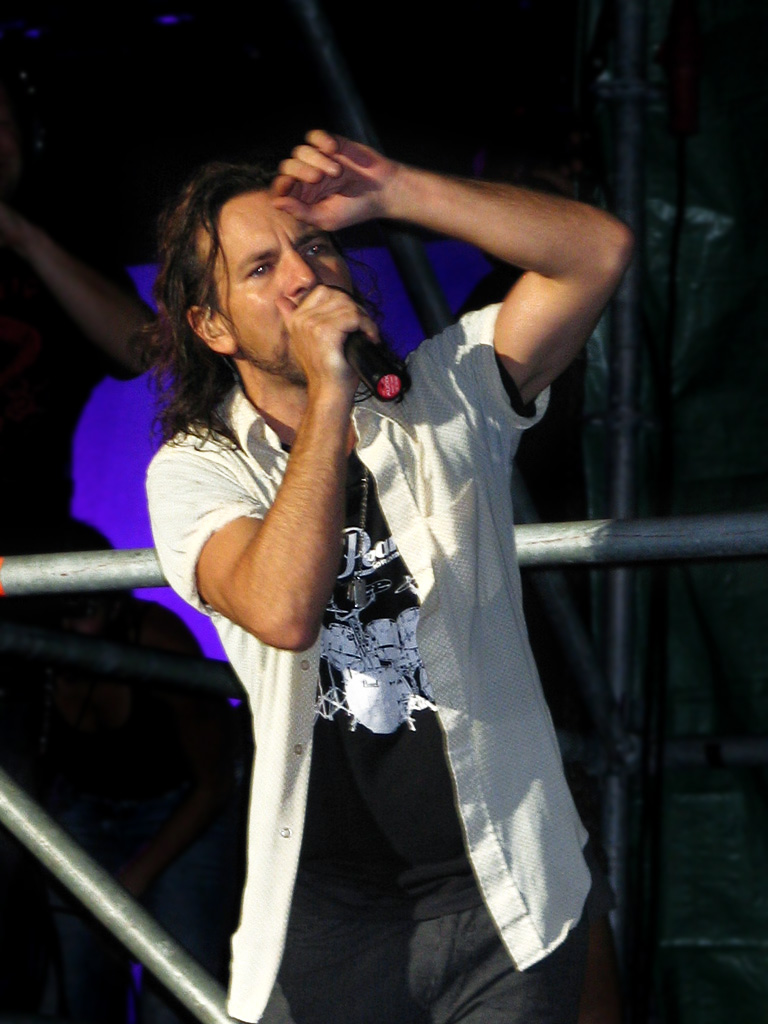
Eddie Vedder on stage with Pearl Jam in Pistoia, Italy on September 20, 2006.

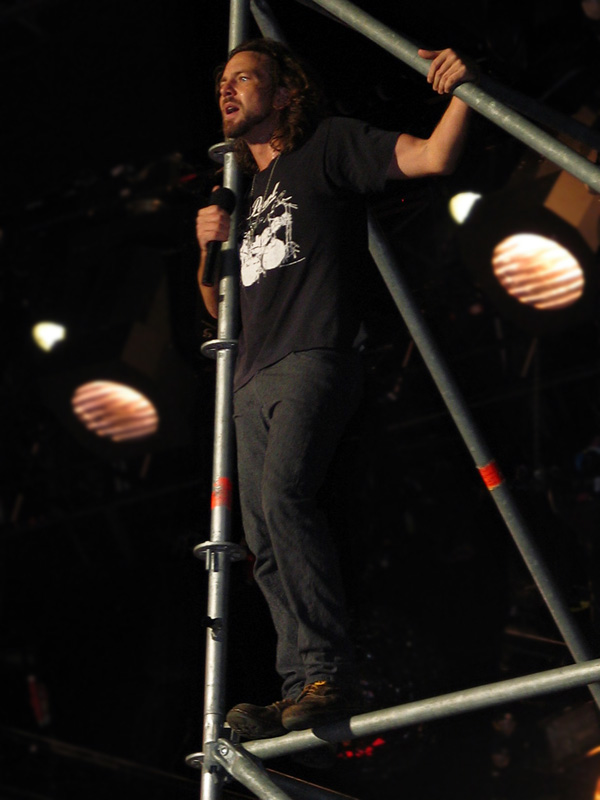
Eddie Vedder on stage with Pearl Jam in Pistoia, Italy on September 20, 2006.

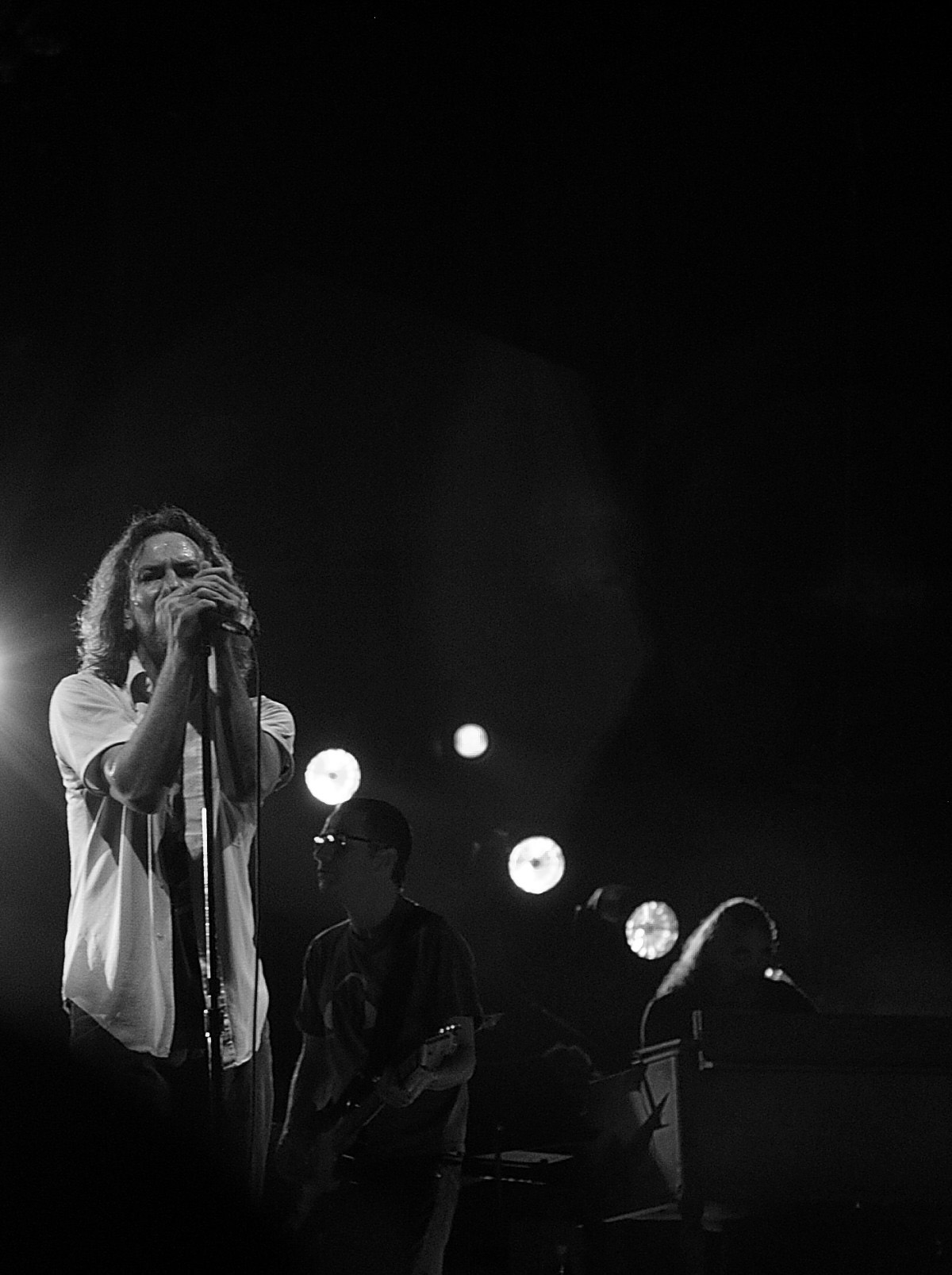
Pearl Jam in Berlin, Germany on September 23, 2006.

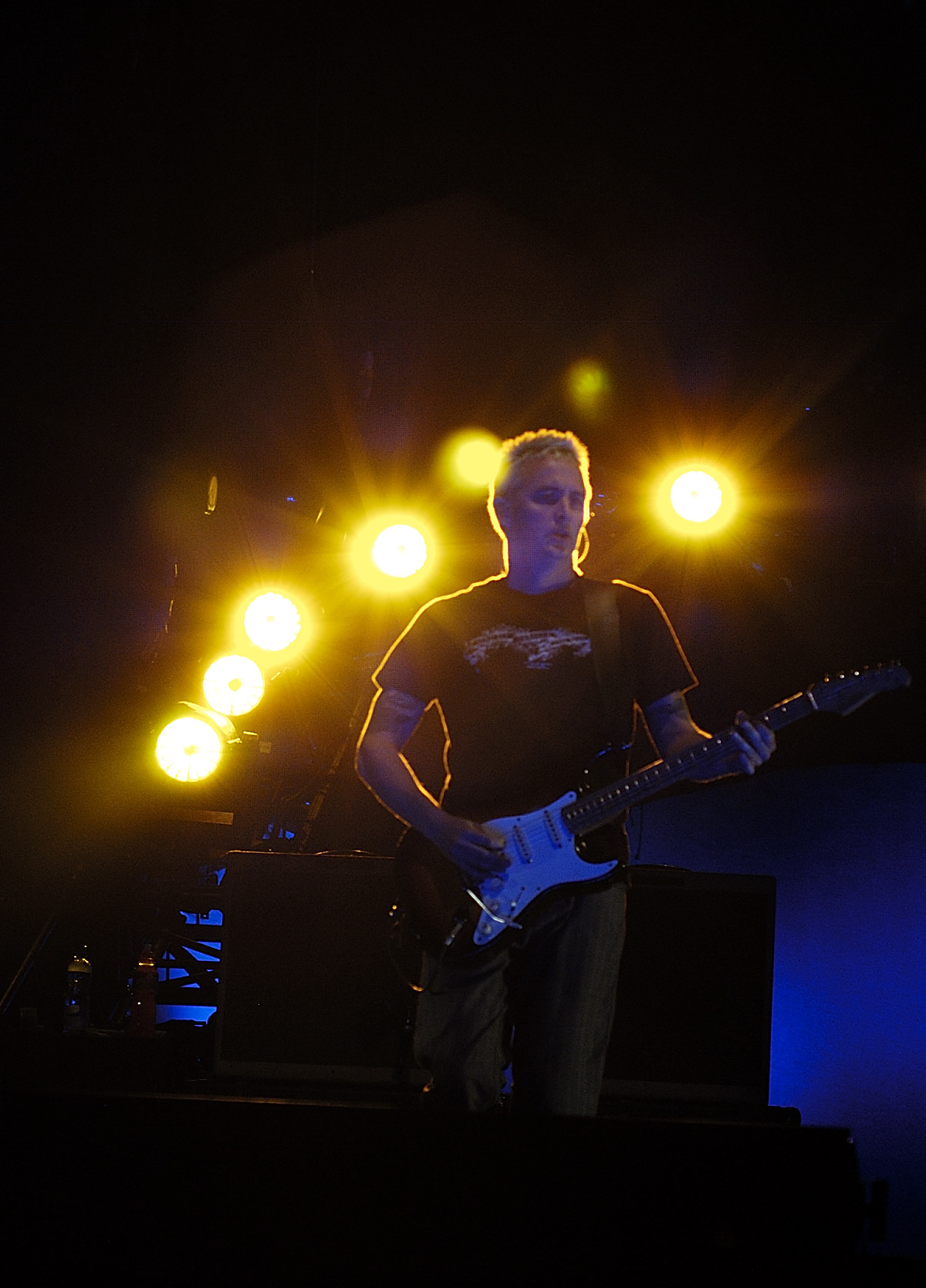
Mike McCready on stage with Pearl Jam in Berlin, Germany on September 23, 2006.

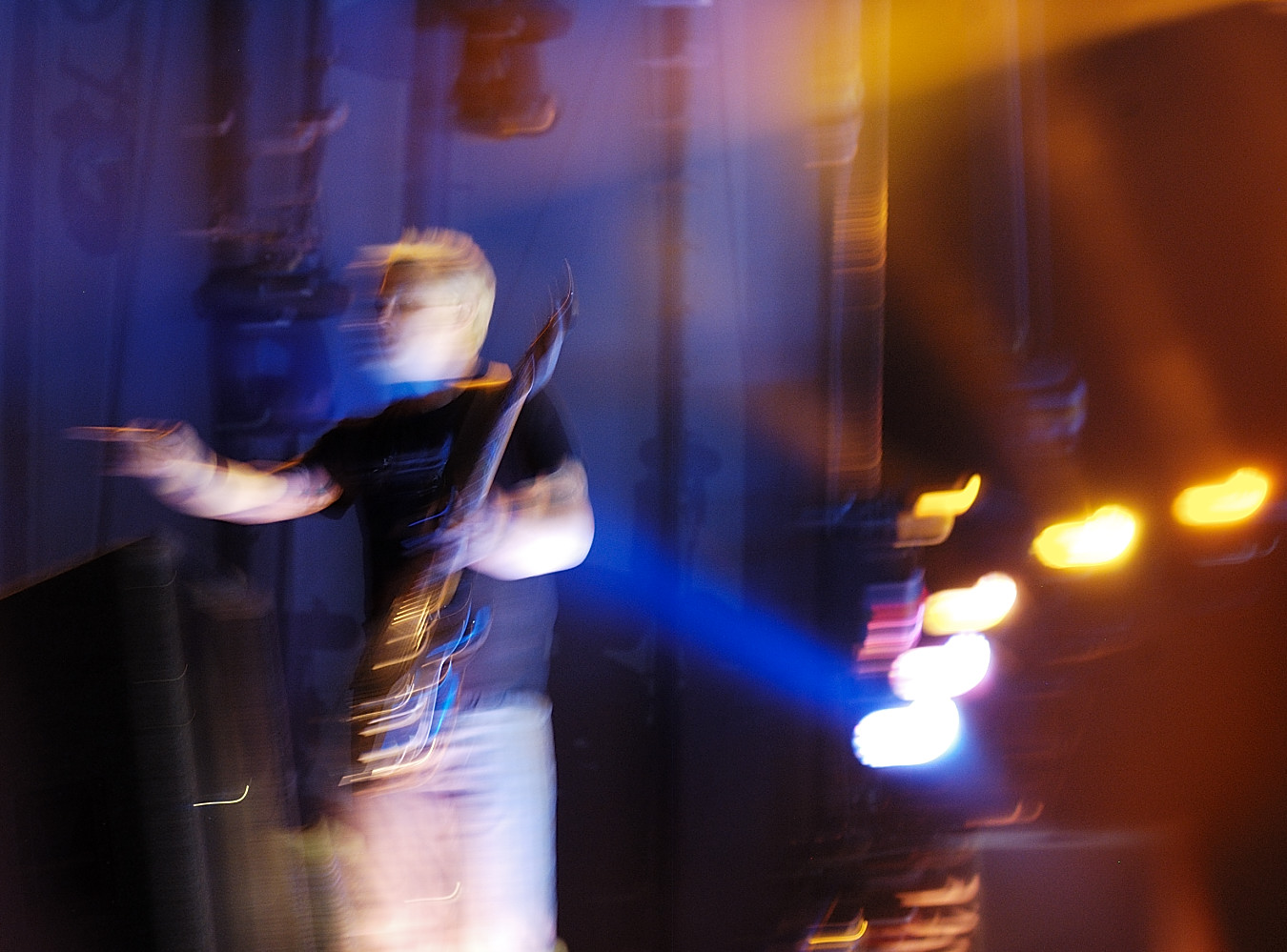
Mike McCready on stage with Pearl Jam in Berlin, Germany on September 23, 2006.

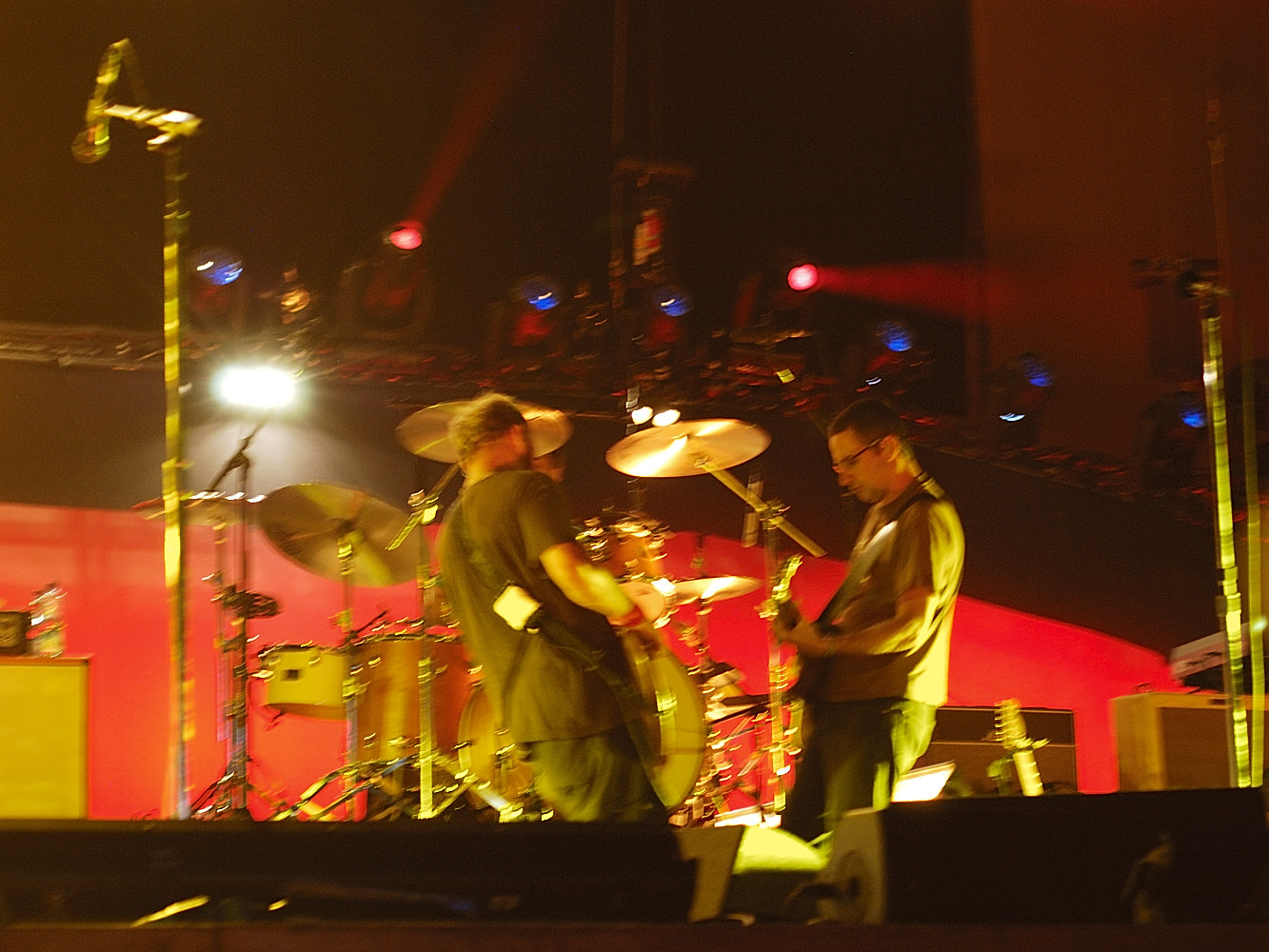
Pearl Jam in Berlin, Germany on September 23, 2006.

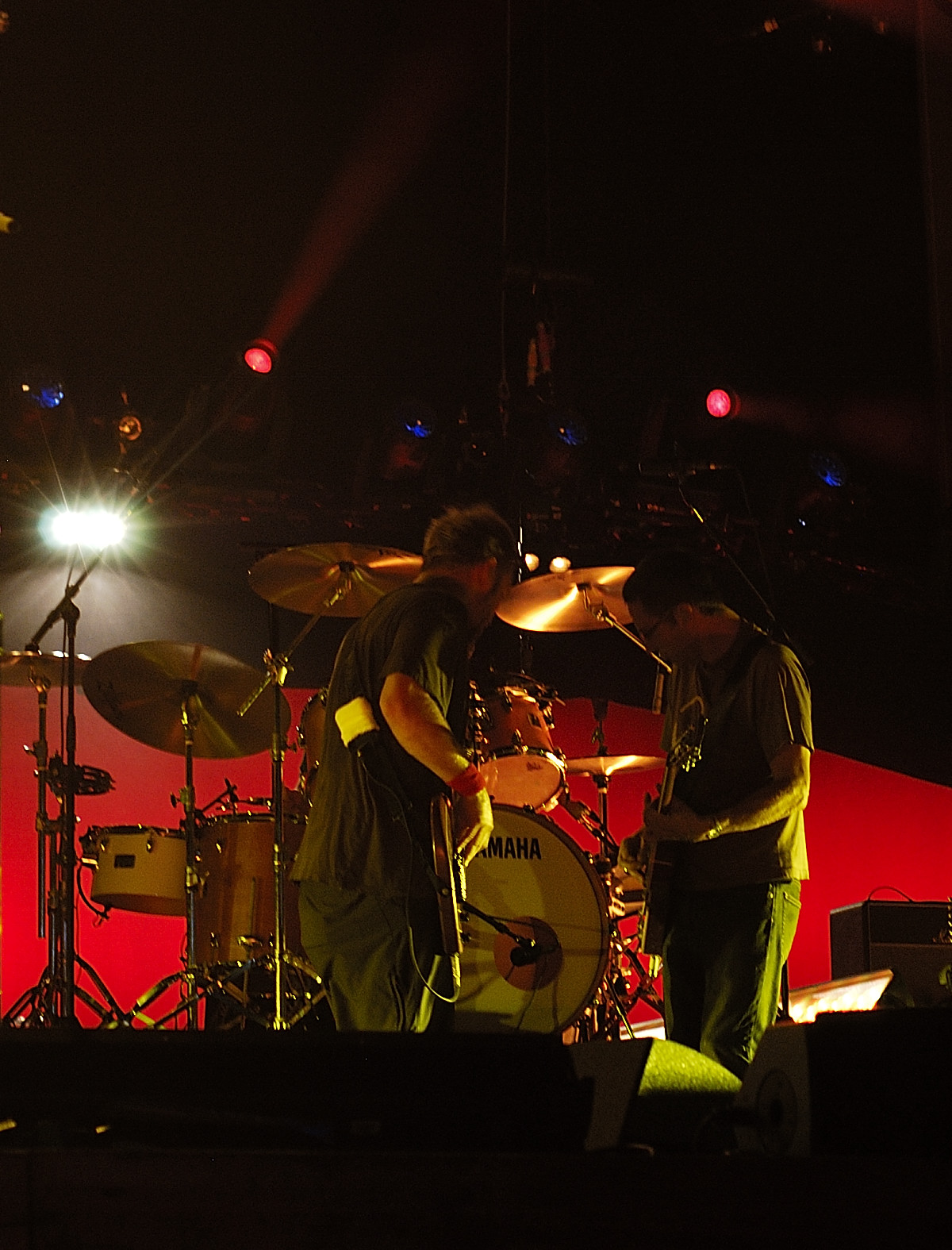
Pearl Jam in Berlin, Germany on September 23, 2006.

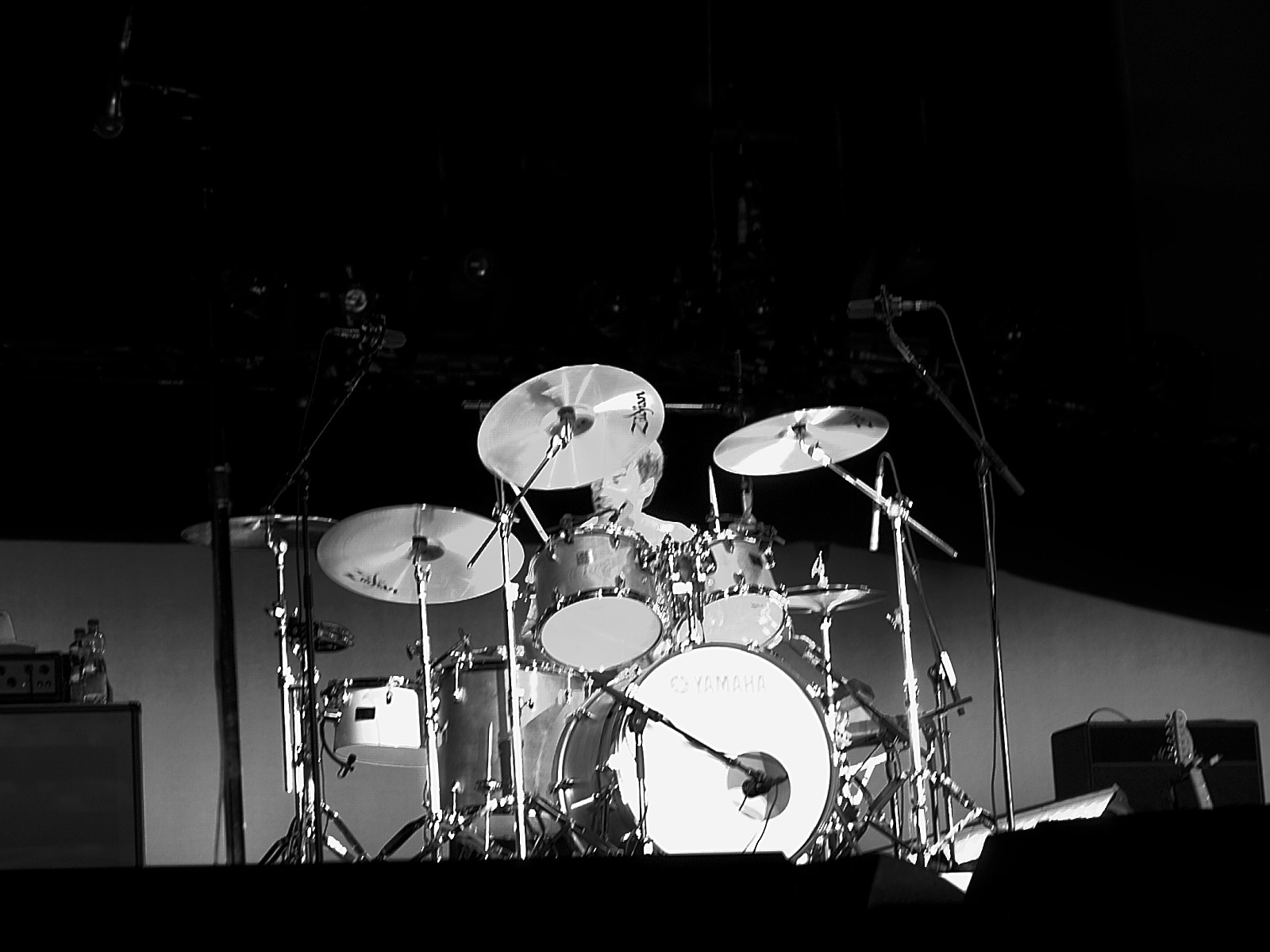
Matt Cameron on stage with Pearl Jam in Berlin, Germany on September 23, 2006.

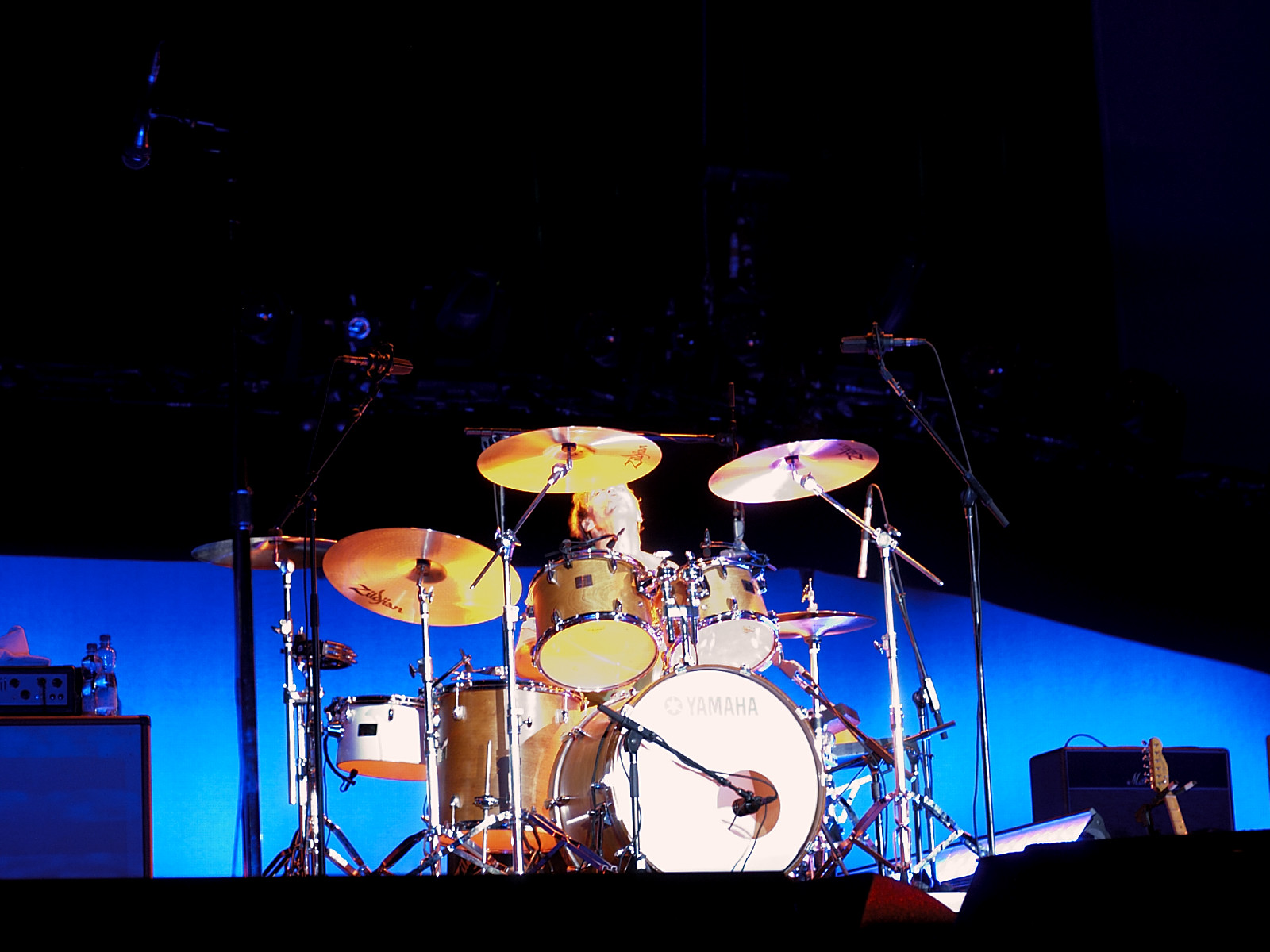
Matt Cameron on stage with Pearl Jam in Berlin, Germany on September 23, 2006.

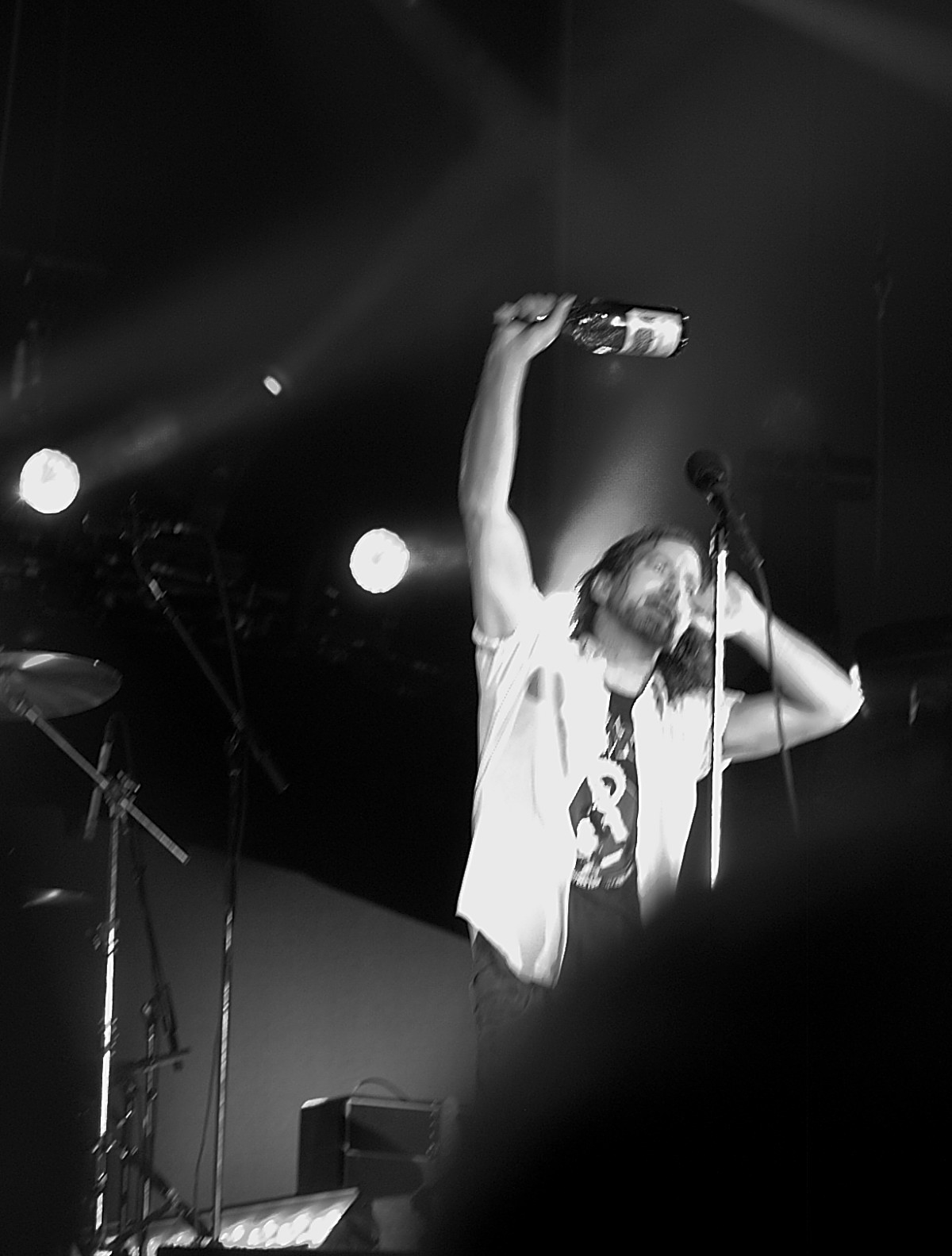
Eddie Vedder on stage with Pearl Jam in Berlin, Germany on September 23, 2006.

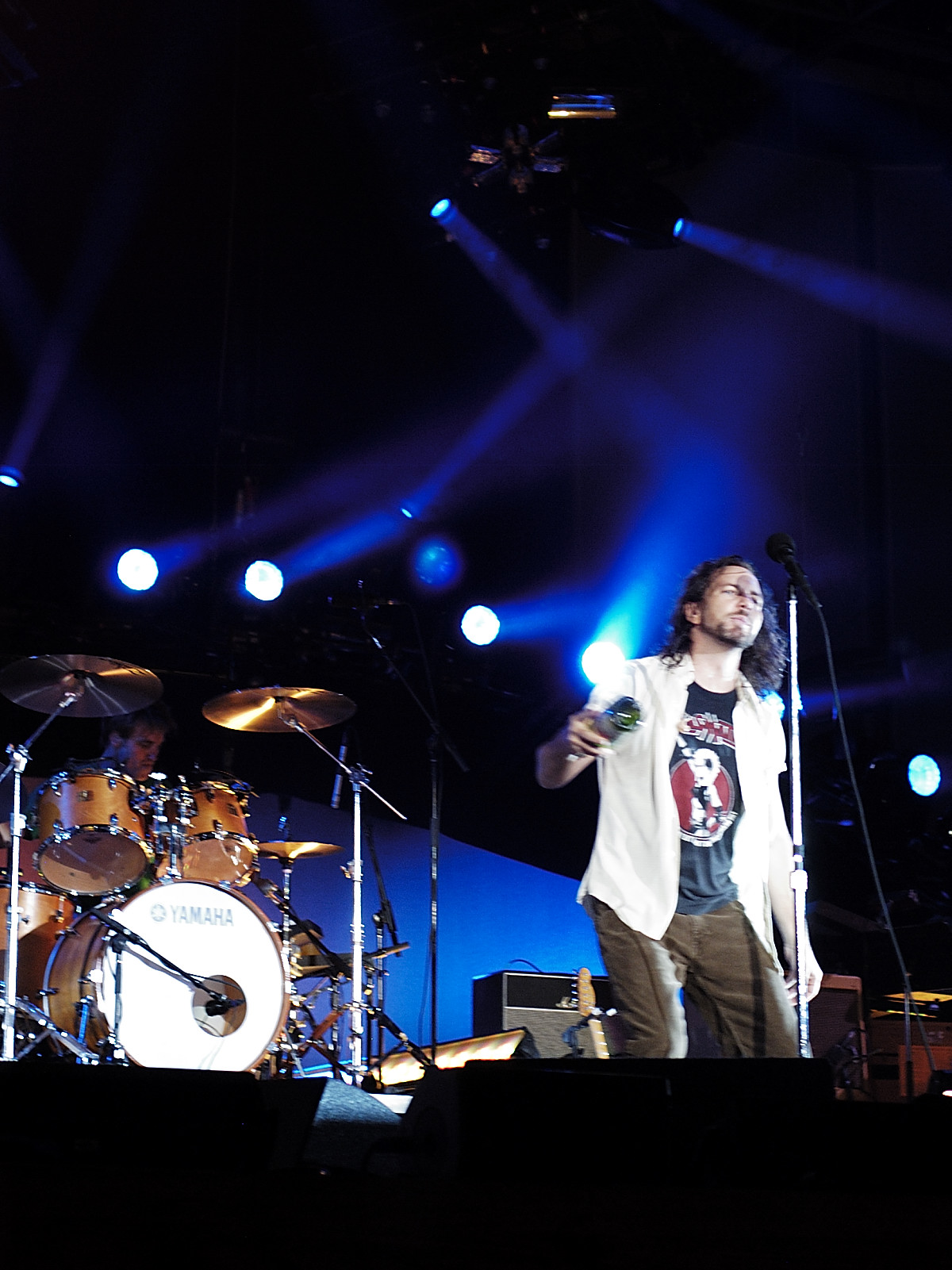
Pearl Jam in Berlin, Germany on September 23, 2006.

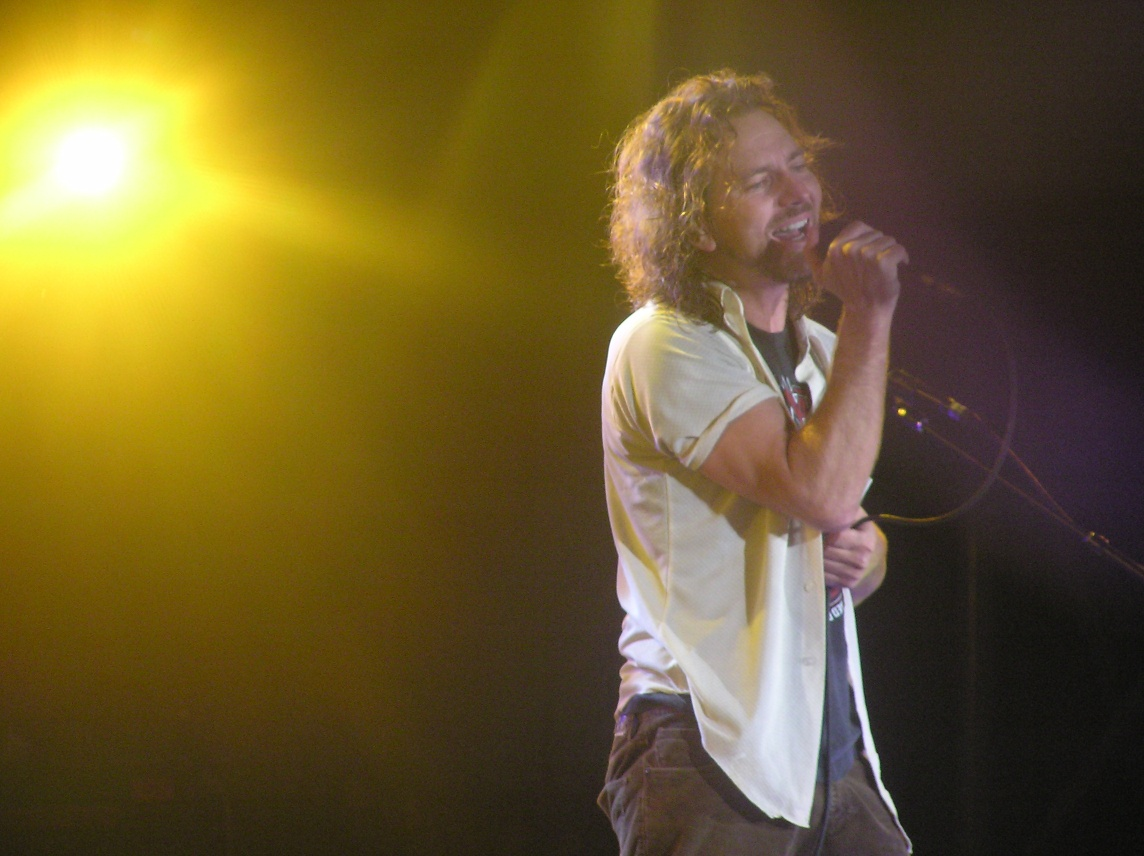
Eddie Vedder on stage with Pearl Jam in Berlin, Germany on September 23, 2006.

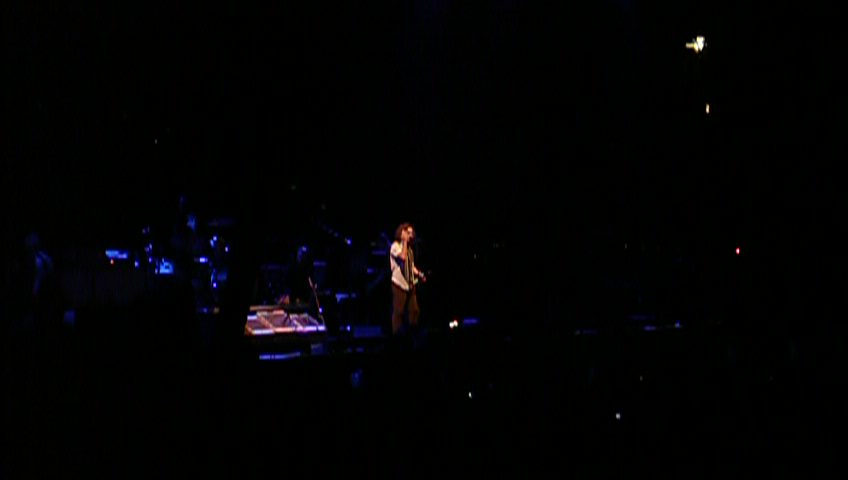
Eddie Vedder on stage with Pearl Jam in Berlin, Germany on September 23, 2006.

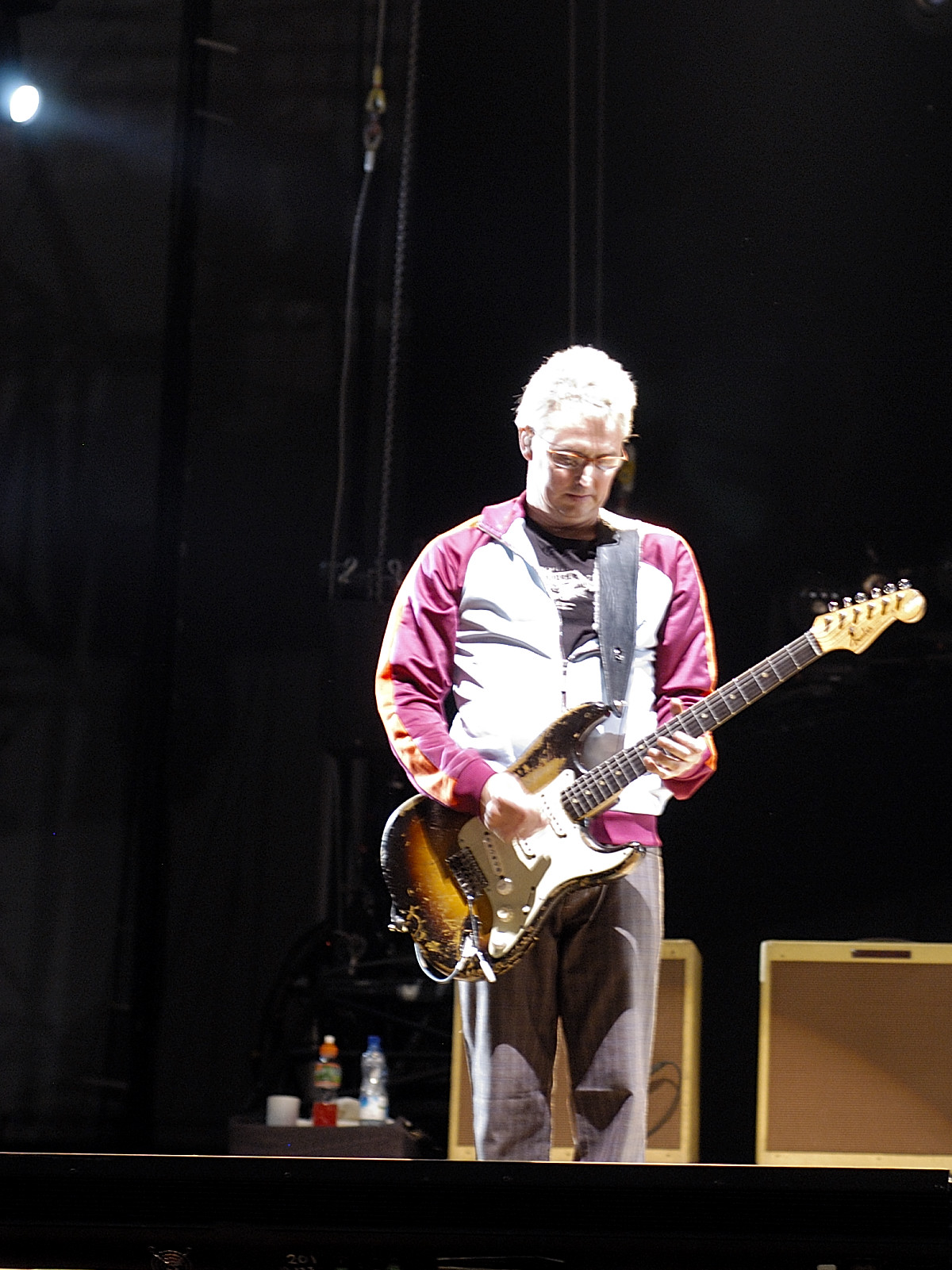
Mike McCready on stage with Pearl Jam in Berlin, Germany on September 23, 2006.

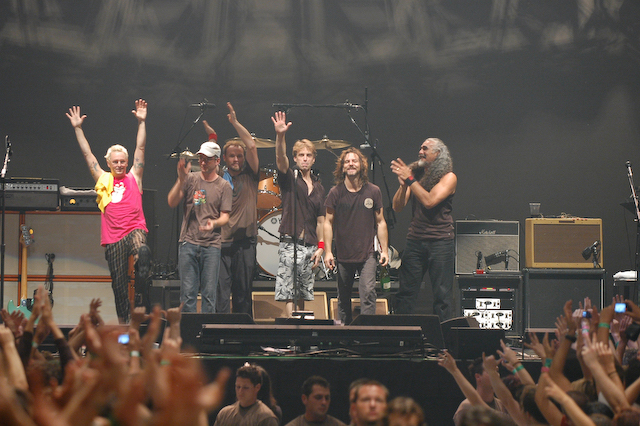
Pearl Jam in Vienna, Austria on September 25, 2006.
