= Midnight Gasoline =

Studio album by Jamey Johnson
- Released: November 8, 2024
- Studio: Cash Cabin Studio (Hendersonville, Tennessee)
- Genre: Country
- Length: 49:20
- Label: Warner Music Nashville; Big Gassed Records
- Producer: The Kent Hardly Playboys; Dave Cobb

Jamey Johnson chronology
The Christmas Song (2014)	Midnight Gasoline (2024)

Singles from Midnight Gasoline
- 1. "21 Guns" Released: May 24, 2024; 2. "What a View / Trudy" Released: July 26, 2024; 3. "Sober" Released: August 30, 2024

Midnight Gasoline is the fifth studio album by American country music artist Jamey Johnson. The album was released on November 8, 2024, via Warner Music Nashville and Big Gassed Records. It was co-produced by the Kent Hardly Playboys and Dave Cobb. The album marks Johnson's first collection of original material in 14 years, following his acclaimed 2010 double album The Guitar Song.

== Background and recording ==
Though Johnson recorded Living for a Song in 2012, Midnight Gasoline marks his first original material in over a decade.

The inspiration to return to recording came in part from the death of Johnson's friend and collaborator Toby Keith, whose death motivated Johnson to work on his discography: "That was the end of his discography, and that's what drove me to wanting to finish my own," Johnson explained.

The album was recorded in three weeks at the Cash Cabin Studio. He recorded 30 songs in that time, many of which are expected to appear on future installments in the Cash Cabin Series.

The album features contributions from longtime collaborators, including Randy Houser, who sings on "Tired of It All" and "Trudy," and Chris Stapleton, who co-wrote "Saturday Night in New Orleans" with Johnson and the late Tony Joe White. Johnson and White began the song before White died in 2018, and Stapleton helped finish it years later.

The first half of the album was produced by the Kent Hardly Playboys, Johnson's longtime band, while the second half was produced by Dave Cobb, who had also worked on That Lonesome Song and The Guitar Song.

Midnight Gasoline was officially announced on October 4, 2024, with a November 8 release date via Warner Music Nashville. That same day, he released "Someday When I'm Old". A music video for the track premiered on CMT and featured Johnson "de-aged" via artificial intelligence to appear as his younger self, offering advice to the present-day artist.

== Critical reception ==
Professional ratings
Review scores
Source	Rating
Rolling Stone	3.5/5 stars
Allmusic	4/5 stars

Midnight Gasoline received acclaim for its emotional depth and authenticity. Critics praised Johnson's rich voice and the album's unvarnished production style, likening it to his earlier work while acknowledging a more mature perspective.

Reviewers singled out "One More Time," "Sober," and "Midnight Gasoline" as highlights for their emotional resonance and lyrical poignancy. Wide Open Country wrote that the title track "swells and throbs like a lone wolf howling in the night," while Billboard praised Johnson's ability to "connect modern country with his songwriting heroes of the past."

== Track listing ==
No.	Title	Writer(s)	Length
1.	"Bad Guy"	Dale Dodson; Jamey Johnson	3:28
2.	"Midnight Gasoline"	Dean Dillon; Scotty Emerick; Jeff Hyde	3:45
3.	"What a View"	Dallas Davidson; Rob Hatch; Randy Houser; Johnson	3:10
4.	"21 Guns"	Jim Brown; Johnson	3:43
5.	"Someday When I'm Old"	Chris Lindsey; Aimee Mayo; Troy Verges	3:40
6.	"Trudy" (featuring Randy Houser)	Charlie Daniels	5:09
7.	"One More Time"	Hatch; Johnson; Ernest Keith Smith	4:33
8.	"Saturday Night in New Orleans"	Johnson; Chris Stapleton; Tony Joe White	4:25
9.	"Sober"	Johnson; James T. Slater	4:57
10.	"I'm Tired of It All" (featuring Randy Houser)	Davidson; Kyle Fishman	3:50
11.	"No Time Like the Past"	Johnson; Stapleton	4:30
12.	"What You Answer To"	Ira Dean; Johnson; Ajay Popoff; Jeremy Popoff	4:10
Total length:			49:20

== Personnel ==
- Jamey Johnson – vocals (all tracks), acoustic guitar (1, 3–6, 9, 12), background vocals (1, 4)
- Randy Houser – vocals (tracks 6, 10)
- Kevin "Swine" Grantt – bass (tracks 1–6)
- Dave McAfee – drums (tracks 1, 2, 5)
- James Mitchell – electric guitar (tracks 1, 6)
- Cowboy Eddie Long – steel guitar (tracks 1, 3–6)
- Jim "Moose" Brown – Wurlitzer piano (tracks 1, 3), acoustic guitar (3, 4), keyboard (5), piano, Hammond organ (6)
- Tom Bukovac – electric guitar (tracks 2, 5), acoustic guitar (2)
- Melonie Cannon – background vocals (tracks 2, 3, 5, 7, 11, 12)
- Wyatt Beard – background vocals (tracks 2, 3, 5, 7, 10–12)
- Chris Powell – drums (tracks 3, 4, 6–12), percussion (7, 8, 11)
- Mickey Raphael – harmonica (track 3)
- Dick Aven – saxophone (track 6)
- Mart Avant – trumpet (track 6)
- Jimmy Bowland – baritone saxophone (track 6)
- Brian Allen – bass (tracks 7–12)
- Philip Town – piano (tracks 7–11), Hammond organ (7–9, 11), mellotron (7), keyboard (12)
- Leroy Powell – slide guitar (track 7), electric guitar, harp (8–12), acoustic guitar (12)
- Bobby Campo – trumpet (track 8)
- The Kent Hardly Playboys – producer (tracks 1–6)
- Dave Cobb – producer, acoustic guitar (tracks 7–12)
- T. W. Cargile – mixing (all tracks)
- Randy Leroy – mastering (all tracks)
- Misha Kachkachishvili – engineer (track 8)

== Accolades ==
Year-end lists
Publication	Rank	List
Billboard	4	The 10 Best Country Albums of 2024
Taste of Country	6	The 10 Best Country Albums of 2024
