= Live on Ten Legs =

2011 album

Live album by Pearl Jam
- Released: January 17, 2011
- Recorded: 2003–2010
- Genre: Alternative rock, grunge, hard rock
- Language: English
- Label: Monkeywrench Records

Pearl Jam live albums chronology
Live at Lollapalooza 2007 (2007)	Live on Ten Legs (2011)	Pearl Jam Twenty (2011)

Professional ratings
Aggregate scores
Source	Rating
Metacritic	72/100
Review scores
Source	Rating
AllMusic	3/5 stars
Classic Rock	8/10
Consequence of Sound	3.5/5 stars
Drowned in Sound	8/10
Rolling Stone	4/5 stars

Live on Ten Legs is a live album by American rock band Pearl Jam released on January 17, 2011. Composed of songs recorded during the band's 2003–2010 world tours, it is a companion piece to their 1998 live album, Live on Two Legs. All songs were remixed by longtime Pearl Jam engineer, Brett Eliason.

The album packaging is similar to the previous official live compilation. Photos of the band in concert are featured on the inside of the cover. A gatefold opens to reveal photos of the road crew and full colour reproductions of various concert posters from the band's tours of this era.

== Critical reception ==
Live on Ten Legs earned generally positive reviews. "Inevitably, it's the old favourites that elicit the biggest cheers and carry greatest power…" wrote Paul Elliott in Classic Rock. "But this is an album full of great songs and great performances, confirming Vedder as one of the finest singers of his generation, and Pearl Jam as one of the truly iconic rock 'n' roll bands."

The album has been described as "well-produced", but at the same time lacking a real "live feel": the album has been described as having a very studio-like sound.

== Track listing ==
All lyrics are written by Eddie Vedder, except where noted.

No.	Title	Lyrics	Music	Length
1.	"Arms Aloft" (Joe Strummer & The Mescaleros cover)	Joe Strummer	Strummer, Scott Shields, Martin Slattery, Simon Stafford, Luke Bullen	3:27
2.	"World Wide Suicide"		Vedder	3:16
3.	"Animal"		Dave Abbruzzese, Jeff Ament, Stone Gossard, Mike McCready, Vedder	2:41
4.	"Got Some"		Ament	2:57
5.	"State of Love and Trust"		Vedder, McCready, Ament	3:18
6.	"I Am Mine"		Vedder	3:23
7.	"Unthought Known"		Vedder	3:55
8.	"Rearviewmirror"		Abbruzzese, Ament, Gossard, McCready, Vedder	7:00
9.	"The Fixer"		Matt Cameron, McCready, Gossard	3:27
10.	"Nothing as It Seems"	Ament	Ament	5:13
11.	"In Hiding"		Gossard	4:52
12.	"Just Breathe"		Vedder	3:53
13.	"Jeremy"		Ament	5:19
14.	"Public Image" (Public Image Ltd cover)	John Lydon	Lydon, Keith Levene, Jah Wobble, Jim Walker	2:52
15.	"Spin the Black Circle"		Abbruzzese, Ament, Gossard, McCready, Vedder	3:05
16.	"Porch"		Vedder	7:00
17.	"Alive"		Gossard	6:21
18.	"Yellow Ledbetter"		Ament, McCready, Vedder	5:20

== Personnel ==
Pearl Jam

- Eddie Vedder – vocals, guitar
- Jeff Ament – bass guitar; audio and visual concept
- Matt Cameron – drums
- Stone Gossard – guitar
- Mike McCready – guitar

Additional musician and production

- Boom Gaspar – keyboards
- John Burton – recording
- Brett Eliason – mixing
- Ed Brooks – mastering
- Regan Hagar – design
- Karen Loria – photos
- Lance Mercer – back cover photo

== Charts ==
Chart (2011)	Peak position
Australian Albums (ARIA)	15
Austrian Albums (Ö3 Austria)	21
Belgian Albums (Ultratop Flanders)	28
Belgian Albums (Ultratop Wallonia)	40
Canadian Albums Chart	2
Danish Albums (Hitlisten)	32
Dutch Albums (Album Top 100)	9
French Albums (SNEP)	107
German Albums (Offizielle Top 100)	23
Italian Albums (FIMI)	13
Mexican Albums (Top 100 Mexico)	42
New Zealand Albums (RMNZ)	22
Portuguese Albums (AFP)	1
Spanish Albums (PROMUSICAE)	12
Swiss Albums (Schweizer Hitparade)	31
US Billboard 200	21
