= The Wall (Willie Nelson song) =

Single by Willie Nelson

from the album Band of Brothers
- Released: May 6, 2014
- Recorded: 2013
- Genre: Country
- Length: 3:29
- Label: Legacy Recordings
- Songwriters: Willie Nelson, Buddy Cannon
- Producer: Buddy Cannon

Willie Nelson singles chronology
"Somewhere Between" (2013)	"The Wall" (2014)	"Bring it On" (2014)

"The Wall" is a song written by country music singer Willie Nelson and producer Buddy Cannon. The track became the first single of Nelson's Band of Brothers.

== Overview ==
In 2014, Nelson released the album Band of Brothers, his first release composed of all songs written by him since the 1996 release of Spirit.

Nelson co-wrote the song with Buddy Cannon based on his life and experiences on the road. "The Wall" became the first single of the album. The official video was released through Rolling Stone on May 6, 2014. It was made available for download on digital stores on the same day, while it was given for free to those who preordered the album. In June 2014, Nelson released through his website an acoustic version of the song.
