= The Christmas Song (EP) =

EP by Jamey Johnson
- Released: November 19, 2014
- Genre: Country, Christmas music
- Length: 16:49
- Label: Big Gassed Records
- Producer: Dave Cobb

Jamey Johnson chronology
Living for a Song: A Tribute to Hank Cochran (2012)	The Christmas Song (2014)	Midnight Gasoline (2024)

The Christmas Song is an EP by American country artist Jamey Johnson. It was released on November 19, 2014 as the first release by Johnson's own label, Big Gassed Records.

The album features four covers of Christmas- and holiday-themed songs, in addition to an original composition by Johnson, "South Alabam Christmas". The song is the first new original composition by Johnson since The Guitar Song was released in 2010.

== Track listing ==
No.	Title	Writer(s)	Length
1.	"Baby, It's Cold Outside" (featuring Lily Meola)	Frank Loesser	3:28
2.	"Mele Kalikimaka" (featuring The Secret Sisters)	Robert Alexander Anderson	2:53
3.	"South Alabam Christmas"	Jamey Johnson	3:41
4.	"Pretty Paper"	Willie Nelson	2:38
5.	"The Christmas Song"	Robert Wells, Mel Tormé	3:59
Total length:			16:49

== Chart performance ==
Chart (2014)	Peak position
US Top Country Albums (Billboard)	43
