= Band of Brothers (Willie Nelson album) =

Studio album by Willie Nelson
- Released: June 17, 2014
- Recorded: October 2013, March 2014
- Studio: Pedernales Recording (Spicewood, Texas)
- Genre: Country
- Length: 47:21
- Label: Legacy
- Producer: Buddy Cannon

Willie Nelson chronology
To All the Girls... (2013)	Band of Brothers (2014)	December Day: Willie’s Stash, Vol. 1 (2014)

Singles from Band of Brothers
- 1. "The Wall" Released: May 6, 2014; 2. "Wives and Girlfriends" Released: June 10, 2014; 3. "Band of Brothers" Released: June 18, 2014

Band of Brothers is the 63rd studio album by country music singer-songwriter Willie Nelson. The album marks Nelson's return to writing after sixteen years, with nine out of the fourteen tracks being new original songs.

The album was released on June 17, 2014, by Legacy Recordings. It opened to favorable reviews, while it topped Billboard's Top Country Albums and reached number five on the Billboard 200.

== Recording ==
Produced by Buddy Cannon, the album was recorded by Nelson during October 2013 and March 2014. The sessions took place at Nashville's Sound Emporium Studios with additional recordings at Pedernales Studio in Austin, Texas and The Hit Factory Criteria in Miami, Florida. Additional studios included Blackbird Recording Studios and The Doghouse, in Nashville; Esplanade Studios in New Orleans; and Carrtune Studios, where it was mixed by Butch Carr. The recording was dedicated to Carr, who died two weeks after the completion of the album.

After selecting the songs, Nelson recorded a sample of the tracks with his guitar, later sending them to Buddy Cannon. On the studio, Cannon hired the session musicians and arranged the musical track with them based on the demo recordings. Nelson later recorded his voice on the studio and the tracks were dubbed.

Nine of the fourteen tracks consist in newly written compositions by Nelson, the most included in one of his album releases since 1996's Spirit. The album includes covers of Vince Gill's "Whenever You Come Around", Bill Anderson's 2011 "The Songwriters" and a duet with Jamey Johnson of Billy Joe Shaver's 2012 "The Git Go".

== Release ==
The video for the first single, "The Wall" was premiered on May 6, 2014 by Rolling Stone, while the single itself was made available for download on the same day. The single "Bring It On" was later premiered on June 3 by ESPN Music. The full album was released on June 17, 2014 by Legacy Recordings.

Upon its release, Band of Brothers sold 37,000 copies. The album topped Billboard's Top Country albums chart, becoming Nelson's first country chart-topper since 1986's The Promiseland. The release reached number five on the Billboard 200, Nelson's highest position on the chart since 1982's Always on My Mind.

== Critical reception ==
Professional ratings
Aggregate scores
Source	Rating
Metacritic	79/100
Review scores
Source	Rating
AllMusic	4/5 stars
American Songwriter	3.5/5 stars
The A.V. Club	C+
Country Weekly	A
The Daily Telegraph	4/5 stars
Exclaim!	6/10
The Observer	3/5 stars
Pitchfork	7.4/10
PopMatters	9/10
Rolling Stone	3.5/5 stars

According to review aggregator website Metacritic, the album has a Metascore of 79, which is based on the ratings and reviews of fifteen selected independent mainstream critics, and this means the release garnered "generally favorable reviews". At AllMusic, Thom Jurek compared the release to Buddy Cannon's producing with Nelson's recordings of the mid-1970s, remarking that without leaning on a "retro" sound, the instrumentation "paint(s)" the tracks "beautifully". In addition, Jurek declared that besides being a recognized "vocal stylist" by the American musical scene, Nelson "is a classic country singer and songwriter first". Will Hermes writing for Rolling Stone rated the album three-and-a-half stars out of five, praising the songwriting, and noting that Nelson "has lost neither verve nor cojones". At The New York Times, Jon Pareles gave a positive review, and commented how "Willie Nelson the songwriter reappears on Band of Brothers", and described it as a "serenely feisty autumnal statement".

At American Songwriter, Jonathan Bernstein rated the album three-and-a-half stars out of five, declaring that in Band of Brothers, "Nelson mostly proves he's still as sharp a vocalist as ever". James Hall writing for The Daily Telegraph rated the album four stars out of five, indicating how in his vocal range "There's plenty of life in the old dog yet." At Country Weekly, Bob Paxman graded the album an A, remarking how "In typical Willie fashion, Band of Brothers shows the many sides of the man, who continues to prove that he's a master of his art." Also, Paxman says "This is one more gem for your essential Willie collection." Stephen M. Deusner rated the album a 7.4 out of ten, highlighting how the release "is still a showcase for what Nelson does best." Ann Powers writing for NPR delivered a favorable review, and according to her "his phrasing remains the best", which she praised the musicians and Buddy Cannon that give nelson "plenty of room" for the arrangements.

At The Observer, Neil Spencer rated the album three stars out of five, praising Nelson's work since signing his agreement with Legacy recordings, and noting that while "nothing matches his peaks" the record "it's still a delight", which Nelson's vocal and guitar playing "are still unique, still oddly touching". Marah Eakin of The A.V. Club graded the album a C+, noting that while the record was not "as rollicking as any of Nelson’s old outlaw material, it’s made up of solid tracks all the same." However, Eakin concluded that the album was not Nelson's "best album of all time (but) pretty good at best." At Exclaim!, Blake Morneau rated the album a six out of ten, saying that "While [...] consistent and solid, [...] rarely exciting."

== Track listing ==
No.	Title	Writer(s)	Length
1.	"Bring it On"	Willie Nelson, Buddy Cannon	2:54
2.	"Guitar in the Corner"	Willie Nelson, Buddy Cannon	3:56
3.	"The Wall"	Willie Nelson, Buddy Cannon	3:29
4.	"Whenever You Come Around"	Vince Gill, Pete Wasner	4:13
5.	"Wives and Girlfriends"	Willie Nelson, Buddy Cannon	3:02
6.	"I Thought I Left You"	Willie Nelson, Buddy Cannon	3:02
7.	"Send Me a Picture"	Willie Nelson, Buddy Cannon	3:59
8.	"Used to Her"	Willie Nelson, Buddy Cannon	2:47
9.	"The Git Go" (featuring Jamey Johnson)	Billy Joe Shaver, Gary Nicholson	4:08
10.	"Band of Brothers"	Willie Nelson, Buddy Cannon	2:51
11.	"Hard to Be an Outlaw"	Billy Joe Shaver	3:09
12.	"Crazy Like Me"	Dennis Morgan, Shawn Camp, Billy Burnette	3:17
13.	"The Songwriters"	Gordie Sampson, Bill Anderson	3:16
14.	"I've Got a Lot of Traveling to Do"	Willie Nelson, Buddy Cannon	3:18

== Personnel ==
- Eddie Bayers – drums
- Jim "Moose" Brown – Hammond B-3 organ, piano, synthesizer, Wurlitzer
- Kevin "Swine" Grantt – upright bass
- Jamey Johnson – duet vocals on "The Git Go"
- Mike Johnson – steel guitar
- Willie Nelson – acoustic guitar, lead vocals
- Mickey Raphael – harmonica
- Bobby Terry – acoustic guitar, electric guitar
- Tommy White – steel guitar
- Lonnie Wilson – drums

== Chart performance ==
The album debuted at No. 5 on the Billboard 200, and No. 1 on the Top Country Albums, which represents Nelson's best debut for 28 years. The album also sold 37,000 copies in the US in its first week. The album has sold 65,000 copies in the US as of August 2014.

In the UK, the album debuted at No. 52 selling 1,589 copies for the week.

=== Weekly charts ===
Chart (2014)	Peak position
Belgian Albums (Ultratop Flanders)	107
Dutch Albums (Album Top 100)	69
Norwegian Albums (VG-lista)	17
Scottish Albums (OCC)	29
UK Albums (OCC)	52
US Billboard 200	5
US Top Country Albums (Billboard)	1

=== Year-end charts ===
Chart (2014)	Position
US Top Country Albums (Billboard)	50
