= That Lonesome Song =

Studio album by Jamey Johnson
- Released: August 5, 2008
- Genre: Country
- Length: 56:23
- Label: Mercury Nashville
- Producer: Dave Cobb; The Kent Hardly Playboys

Jamey Johnson chronology
The Dollar (2006)	That Lonesome Song (2008)	The Guitar Song (2010)

Singles from That Lonesome Song
- 1. "In Color" Released: March 17, 2008; 2. "High Cost of Living" Released: March 2009

Professional ratings
Review scores
Source	Rating
Allmusic	4/5 stars
Country Standard Time	favorable
Country Weekly	5/5 stars
Engine 145	4.5/5 stars

That Lonesome Song is the second studio album by American country music singer Jamey Johnson. Initially released to digital retailers in 2007 without the promotion of a record label, the album was physically released on August 5, 2008 (see 2008 in country music) via Mercury Nashville Records. Under Mercury's promotion and distribution, the album has accounted for two singles on the Billboard Hot Country Songs charts. The first of these, "In Color", became Johnson's first and only Top Ten country hit when it peaked at number 9 in early 2009. This song also earned him both Country Music Association and Academy of Country Music award wins for Song of the Year in 2009, as well as a Grammy Award nomination. Its followup, "High Cost of Living", reached number 34 on the same chart.

== History ==
Johnson's previous major-label album, The Dollar, was released in 2006 via BNA Records. It accounted for only one chart single before restructuring of the label forced him to be dropped from its roster. He then went into a reclusive state, staying at a friend's house, where he continued to work on writing songs, including the Number One hits "Give It Away" for George Strait and "Ladies Love Country Boys" for Trace Adkins.

In April 2007, he returned to the recording studio to begin work on his second album, despite not being signed to a label at the time. After the album was complete, he issued it to digital retailers. The album caught the attention of Luke Lewis from Mercury Nashville Records, a label to which Johnson was then signed shortly afterward. Mercury acquired the album as well, issuing "In Color" as its lead-off single. The song, which Johnson co-wrote with Lee Thomas Miller and James Otto, charted in the Top 10 on the country charts, and That Lonesome Song was physically issued by Mercury in August 2008. The Mercury re-issue includes three songs not found on the original ("Mowin' Down The Roses", "The Last Cowboy", and "Between Jennings and Jones"), while two other tracks from the initial release ("Next Ex Thing" and "Leave You Alone") were omitted. Two Waylon Jennings songs are covered on the album as well: "Dreaming My Dreams with You" and "The Door Is Always Open", the latter of which was a Number One Hit for Dave & Sugar.

Dave Cobb co-produced the tracks "Place Out on the Ocean" and "Between Jennings and Jones" with Johnson's road band, the Kent Hardly Playboys (which was composed of Wayd Battle, Jim "Moose" Brown, T.W. Cargile, Kevin "Swine" Grantt, "Cowboy" Eddie Long and Dave Macafee). The Kent Hardly Playboys produced the remainder of the album. Former Alabama bass guitarist Teddy Gentry plays bass guitar on "Stars in Alabama".

== Singles ==
=== "In Color" ===
"In Color" was the first single from the album, released in March 2008. Written by Johnson along with Lee Thomas Miller and Warner Bros. Records artist James Otto, the song became Johnson's first chart single since "The Dollar" in 2005-2006. It reached a peak of number 9 on the country singles charts in January 2009. The song was nominated for Best Country Vocal Performance—Male and Best Country Song at the 51st Grammy Awards, and won Song of the Year at the Country Music Association awards on November 11, 2009, and at the Academy of Country Music awards on April 5, 2009.

=== "High Cost of Living" ===
"High Cost of Living", the album's second single, was released nearly a year after "In Color". This song is a mid-tempo in which the male narrator warns of the consequences of drug addiction; the singer begins smoking pot out of boredom but loses his home, family and sense of direction and is eventually busted for "cocaine and a whore" in a hotel room and sent to prison. He uses the line "The high cost of livin' ain't nothin' like the cost of livin' high" to explain the toll that the vices have had on his life. It peaked at number 34 on the country charts in May 2009.

Kevin J. Coyne of Country Universe.net gave the song an A rating, saying that "[i]t speaks to Johnson’s confidence as a singer and a writer that he is willing to give voice to a character whose actions should deem him unlikable. Through the careful construction of a remorse-laden inner monologue, Johnson gives his character dignity[…]Like so much of great art, it illuminates the humanity that hides in the shadows of shame and sorrowful regret." It was number 38 on Rolling Stone's list of the 100 Best Songs of 2008.

== Critical acclaim ==
Rhapsody (online music service) ranked the album number 5 on its "Country’s Best Albums of the Decade" list. "The quality of Jamey Johnson's storytelling is second only to that of his deep, buttery baritone -- and both are used beautifully on his sophomore effort, That Lonesome Song. Gone are the redneck anthems that dotted his debut, and in their place are songs of loss, growing pains and morning-after regrets. Accolades were heaped on That Lonesome Song upon its release, hailing Johnson for returning country to its proper owners: the downtrodden, heartbroken screw-ups of the world. It could be that commercialization of country has reached a saturation point and Johnson is helping kick off a new outlaw movement, but another decade will be needed to see how that pans out." Engine 145 named it as the number 1 country album of the decade. CMT named it under "A Dozen Favorite Country Albums of the Decade."

== Track listing ==
No.	Title	Writer(s)	Length
1.	"Released"		0:38
2.	"High Cost of Living"	Jamey Johnson; James T. Slater	5:45
3.	"Angel"	Johnson; Jeff Bates	4:28
4.	"Place Out on the Ocean"	Johnson	4:02
5.	"Mowin' Down the Roses"	Johnson; Jeremy Popoff	4:21
6.	"The Door Is Always Open"	Dickey Lee; Bob McDill	3:35
7.	"Mary Go Round"	Johnson; Wyatt Beard	4:52
8.	"In Color"	Johnson; James Otto; Lee Thomas Miller	4:50
9.	"The Last Cowboy"	Johnson; Rob Hatch; Teddy Gentry	4:16
10.	"That Lonesome Song"	Johnson; Kendell Marvel; Wayd Battle	4:01
11.	"Dreaming My Dreams"	Allen Reynolds	4:12
12.	"Women"	Johnson; Jim Brown	3:27
13.	"Stars in Alabama"	Johnson; Gentry	3:45
14.	"Between Jennings and Jones"	Johnson; Buddy Cannon	4:11

== Personnel ==
As listed in liner notes.

- Brian Allen – bass guitar on “Place Out on the Ocean” and “Between Jennings and Jones”
- Wayd Battle – electric guitar
- Wyatt Beard – background vocals
- Jim "Moose" Brown – Hammond B-3 organ, piano, synthesizer, synthesizer strings, acoustic guitar on “In Color”, “That Lonesome Song”, and “Women”, bass guitar on “Women”, drums on “Women”
- Jason "Rowdy" Cope – acoustic guitar on “Between Jennings and Jones”, electric guitar on “Place Out on the Ocean” and “Between Jennings and Jones”
- Teddy Gentry – bass guitar on “Stars in Alabama”, background vocals on "The Last Cowboy” and “Stars in Alabama"
- Kevin "Swine" Grantt – bass guitar
- Jamey Johnson – lead vocals, background vocals, acoustic guitar, electric guitar, tubular bell on "The Last Cowboy"
- "Cowboy" Eddie Long – steel guitar, Dobro on "That Lonesome Song", voice of the Warden on "Released"
- Dave Macafee – drums
- Fred Mandel – synthesizer on “Place Out on the Ocean” and Between Jennings and Jones”
- James Mitchell – electric guitar on “In Color”
- Chris Powell – drums on “Place Out on the Ocean” and “Between Jennings and Jones”
- Robby Turner – steel guitar on “In Color”
- Scott Welch – electric guitar
- Curtis Wright – background vocals

== Charts ==
That Lonesome Song debuted at number 6 on the U.S. Top Country Albums chart. The album has sold 620,000 copies as of November, 2009, and has been certified platinum by the RIAA.

=== Weekly charts ===
Chart (2008)	Peak position
US Billboard 200	28
US Top Country Albums (Billboard)	6

=== Year-end charts ===
Chart (2008)	Position
US Top Country Albums (Billboard)	55
Chart (2009)	Position
US Billboard 200	65
US Top Country Albums (Billboard)	13
Chart (2010)	Position
US Billboard 200	161
US Top Country Albums (Billboard)	61

=== Singles ===
Year	Single	Peak chart positions	
Year	Single	US Country	US
2008	"In Color"	9	52
2009	"High Cost of Living"	34	—
"—" denotes releases that did not chart

== Certifications ==
Region	Certification	Certified units/sales
United States (RIAA)	2× Platinum	2,000,000^{‡}
^{‡} Sales+streaming figures based on certification alone.
