= Amongst the Waves =

Single by Pearl Jam

from the album Backspacer
- B-side: "The End"
- Released: June 21, 2010
- Length: 3:58
- Label: Monkeywrench (US); Universal Music Group (international)
- Composer: Stone Gossard
- Lyricist: Eddie Vedder
- Producer: Brendan O'Brien

Pearl Jam singles chronology
"Got Some" / "Just Breathe" (2009)	"Amongst the Waves" (2010)	"Crown of Thorns" (2011)

Music video
- "Amongst the Waves" on YouTube

"Amongst the Waves" is a song by the American rock band Pearl Jam. Featuring music written by guitarist Stone Gossard and lyrics written by vocalist Eddie Vedder, "Amongst the Waves" was released on June 21, 2010, as the third single from the band's ninth studio album, Backspacer (2009). It was released on May 17, 2010, to radio. The song reached number 17 on the Billboard Alternative Songs chart. A music video for the track was released in July 2010.

== Track listing ==
All lyrics written by Eddie Vedder.

1. "Amongst the Waves" (Music: Stone Gossard) – 3:58
2. "The End" (Music: Vedder) – 2:55

== Charts ==
Chart (2010)	Peak position
Billboard Alternative Songs	17
Billboard Rock Songs	27
Canada Hot 100 (Billboard)	78
Billboard Canada Rock	1
