= Backspacer =

2009 studio album by Pearl Jam

Studio album by Pearl Jam
- Released: September 20, 2009
- Recorded: February 16 – April 30, 2009
- Studios: Henson, Hollywood; Southern Tracks, Atlanta; Doppler, Atlanta
- Genres: Alternative rock; hard rock
- Length: 36:38
- Label: Monkeywrench
- Producer: Brendan O'Brien

Pearl Jam chronology
Pearl Jam (2006)	Backspacer (2009)	Live on Ten Legs (2011)

Singles from Backspacer
- 1. "The Fixer" Released: August 24, 2009; 2. "Got Some"/"Just Breathe" Released: October 31, 2009; 3. "Amongst the Waves" Released: May 17, 2010

Backspacer is the ninth studio album by the American rock band Pearl Jam, released on September 20, 2009. The band members started writing instrumental and demo tracks in 2007, and got together the following year to work on an album. It was recorded from February through April 2009 with producer Brendan O'Brien, who had worked on every Pearl Jam album except their 1991 debut Ten and 2006's self-titled record—although this was his first production credit since 1998's Yield. Material was recorded at Henson Recording Studios in Los Angeles, California, and O'Brien's own Southern Tracks Recording in Atlanta, Georgia. The album features lyrics with a more optimistic look than the politically infused predecessors Riot Act and Pearl Jam, something frontman Eddie Vedder attributed to the election of Barack Obama. At 36 minutes and 38 seconds, Backspacer has the shortest running time of any Pearl Jam studio album.

The band released the album through its own label Monkeywrench Records with worldwide distribution by Universal Music Group via a licensing agreement with Island Records. Physical copies of the record were sold through Target in North America, and promotion included a deal with Verizon, a world tour, and moderately successful singles "The Fixer" and "Got Some"/"Just Breathe". Reviews for Backspacer were largely positive, praising the sound and composition, and the album became Pearl Jam's first chart topper in the U.S. Billboard 200 since No Code, while also topping the charts in Canada, Australia and New Zealand.

== Background and recording ==
In 2007, after Pearl Jam's 2006 tour had ended, the band members began recording demo material on their own while staying in occasional contact via e-mail. Guitarist Mike McCready revealed at the time that he'd tested out some ideas with guitarist Stone Gossard and drummer Matt Cameron in separate sessions as well. After the band was invited to record The Who's "Love, Reign o'er Me" for the Reign Over Me soundtrack, they opted to call long-time collaborator Brendan O'Brien to produce their cover. During the experience, O'Brien and Pearl Jam decided it was a good time for them to work again on a studio album. This ninth album would mark O'Brien's first production credit with Pearl Jam since 1998's Yield. The band allowed O'Brien greater latitude in determining the sound of Backspacer. "At this point, I think we're willing to let somebody cut the songs up a little bit," said lead vocalist Eddie Vedder. "In the past, Brendan would say, 'It's a great song, but I think you should do it in a different key,' and we'd say no. But now that we've heard Bruce [Springsteen] has listened to his suggestions, I think we will too." Bassist Jeff Ament said, "He brings a brutally honest approach to what he thinks is working and what isn't, and it really moves things along... We don't get weighted down with ideas that maybe aren't even that good. He's one of the few people outside of the band that we trust with our music, and we're really, really looking forward to making this record."

The band began working on the album in May 2008, making demos in Seattle, Washington before recording sessions at Henson Recording Studios in Los Angeles, California, where O'Brien usually works. Ament said it was "the first time since the first record that we've really rehearsed instead of just going to the studio with a handful of ideas." In May the band had "about five ideas that have been worked on", which were given some instrumental beds later in the summer. Additional demos were put to tape in December, following a trip by all bandmembers but Vedder to Ament's home in Montana. The singer later proceeded to put rough vocals on those tracks, and also brought in his own material for the band members to work on.

In February 2009, Pearl Jam went for a two-week session at Henson. It was the first time the band spent a considerable amount of time recording outside of Seattle since 1996's No Code. McCready said, "[When] we got together with Ed and it really started getting more cohesive, we took that momentum down to Los Angeles with Brendan... It was a great idea to get us out of Seattle. You've got to get out [of] your comfort zone, and we've talked about doing that for the past 10 years and kind of haven't, so we trusted Brendan's judgment." In April 2009, the band went for a two-week session to finish the album with O'Brien at his mixing facility at Southern Tracks in Atlanta, Georgia. The album took a total of thirty days in the studio to get finished, and O'Brien stated "we had 90% of the record cut in the first nine days".

The album title was chosen in part because of nostalgia for the historical name of the backspace key on typewriters that went out of use in the 1950s and also as a reference to looking back on one's life. Vedder is known to use typewriters when writing lyrics and letters. Vedder said, "Backspacer [means] actually you kind of have to go back and look at your mistake." Gossard said, "There are some retrospective moods on this record, where Ed is looking at both his past and his future." The album title Backspacer was also used for the name of a leatherback turtle that was sponsored by Pearl Jam for Conservation International and National Geographic's Great Turtle Race.

== Music and lyrics ==
"The Fixer"
A sample of "The Fixer", the first single released from the album.

McCready said, "I'd sum it up as kind of a tight, concise, rock 'n' roll record with kind of pop or maybe new wave elements to it... It's a really quick record, but I like that element to it. I like the sparseness of the songs and the way that Brendan pulled us together and made us play as good as we could." Stephen Thomas Erlewine of Allmusic said that "prior to Backspacer, Pearl Jam wouldn't or couldn't have made music this unfettered, unapologetically assured, casual, and, yes, fun." Vedder stated, "The new record feels good so far—really strong and uptempo, stuff we can sink our teeth into", and added that the band's live performances inspired the album's sound: "At one of our gigs, without flashpots and electricity, there's only so much room for those difficult listening songs. That's one reason we kept the arrangements lean." The singer cited Guided by Voices as a reference in creating the shorter and faster songs of Backspacer. Gossard said that Backspacer is "what we could have done for the last five records, in terms of re-engaging with the roots of why this band works", and that "there are plenty of ballads, too... and there are some shifts in how Jeff and Matt and I are all relating—I think this record's got a chance to sound significantly different." Ament said, "There are a couple of great things that Ed brought in that could be real departures for us. Whatever wave Ed caught with [his soundtrack for] Into the Wild has taken him to different places."

Lyrically, Backspacer displays a more positive outlook than the band's last few albums. Vedder credited the election of President Barack Obama as inspiration for the optimistic lyrics. Regarding the lyrics, Vedder said, "I've tried, over the years, to be hopeful in the lyrics, and I think that's going to be easier now." Gossard stated, "We've made a couple of political and pointed records, the last two in particular, and just to move away from that is great, because it allows you to go back to that when you need to and it refreshes everybody, and it comes down to a beat and a melody and your friends and a lyric and a poem and something that's important to you." Vedder stated he did not spend "more than half hour" writing the lyrics to each song: "If it's not going to happen quick then I don't want to do it, because it means there's another one out there that is going to happen quick, and is going to hit you like a lightning bolt."

Vedder called "Gonna See My Friend" a "drug song," but elaborated that the song is about going to see a friend to stay off drugs, and he stated that "Got Some" is about a "drug dealer", but added what the drug the dealer is selling is actually a great rock song. The lyrics to "Johnny Guitar", described by Vedder as "almost an Elvis Costello homage", were inspired by a collage of album covers pasted on the bathroom wall of the band's rehearsal space. Vedder noticed the album cover for Johnny "Guitar" Watson's 1979 album, What the Hell Is This?, and imagined a man who becomes attracted to one of the various women on the cover and then wonders why this woman would rather be one of Watson's many girlfriends instead of his only one. Vedder described "Just Breathe" as "as close to a love song as we've ever gotten", and said that the subject of the song is the happiest times of people's lives when they should just take in the moment and "breathe for a minute". He also said that "Unthought Known" concerns the human psyche, and "Supersonic" is about the love for music. According to Vedder, "Speed of Sound" is taken from the perspective of a man still sitting in a bar after everyone else has left, but he added that even though the song is sad it became more "confident" when played with the whole band. He said "Force of Nature" is "about the strength of one person in the relationship, when they can withstand some of the faults in another". "The End" has been described as an "aching love song".

== Artwork ==
The artwork for the album was handled by editorial cartoonist Dan Perkins, who goes by the pen name Tom Tomorrow. Perkins spent six months working on the artwork. In 2009, Village Voice Media, publishers of 16 alternative weeklies, suspended all syndicated cartoons across their entire chain, including Perkins' strip This Modern World. Perkins lost twelve client papers in cities including Los Angeles, Minneapolis, New York City and Seattle, prompting his friend Vedder to post an open letter on the Pearl Jam website in support of the cartoonist. Perkins referred to the artwork as "dreams and memories", while Gossard referred to the artwork as a "bizarro otherworldy dreamscape".

The album's cover art features nine images created by Perkins, and was revealed through a contest on the band's official website. The nine images were hidden on various websites, and the contest asked Internet users to search for the websites containing the images, whereby the images would be placed on a grid on the Pearl Jam website after clicking on them. After finding all of the images, users were rewarded with a demo version of the song "Speed of Sound". The bottom right image is based on Robert Wiles' photo of Evelyn McHale's suicide. On the cover and spine of the limited edition gatefold sleeve version, the "Backspacer" keys glow in the dark.

== Release and promotion ==
Pearl Jam did not re-sign its record deal with J Records, and the band released the album through its own label Monkeywrench Records in conjunction with Universal Music Group in the United States and through Universal's Island Records internationally. Pearl Jam reached a deal with Target to be the exclusive big-box store retailer for the album in the United States. The album also saw release through the band's official website, independent record stores, online retailers, and iTunes. Those who purchase the compact disc or iTunes version of the album can access a "virtual 'vault'" which features eleven concerts that span from 2005 to 2008, of which up to two can be chosen to download for free; the iTunes edition was also released as an iTunes LP. Tying in with the release of the album, the entire album has been made available as downloadable content for the Rock Band series of video games. A deal with Verizon made the songs from the album available as both ringtone and ringback.

=== Backspacer Tour ===
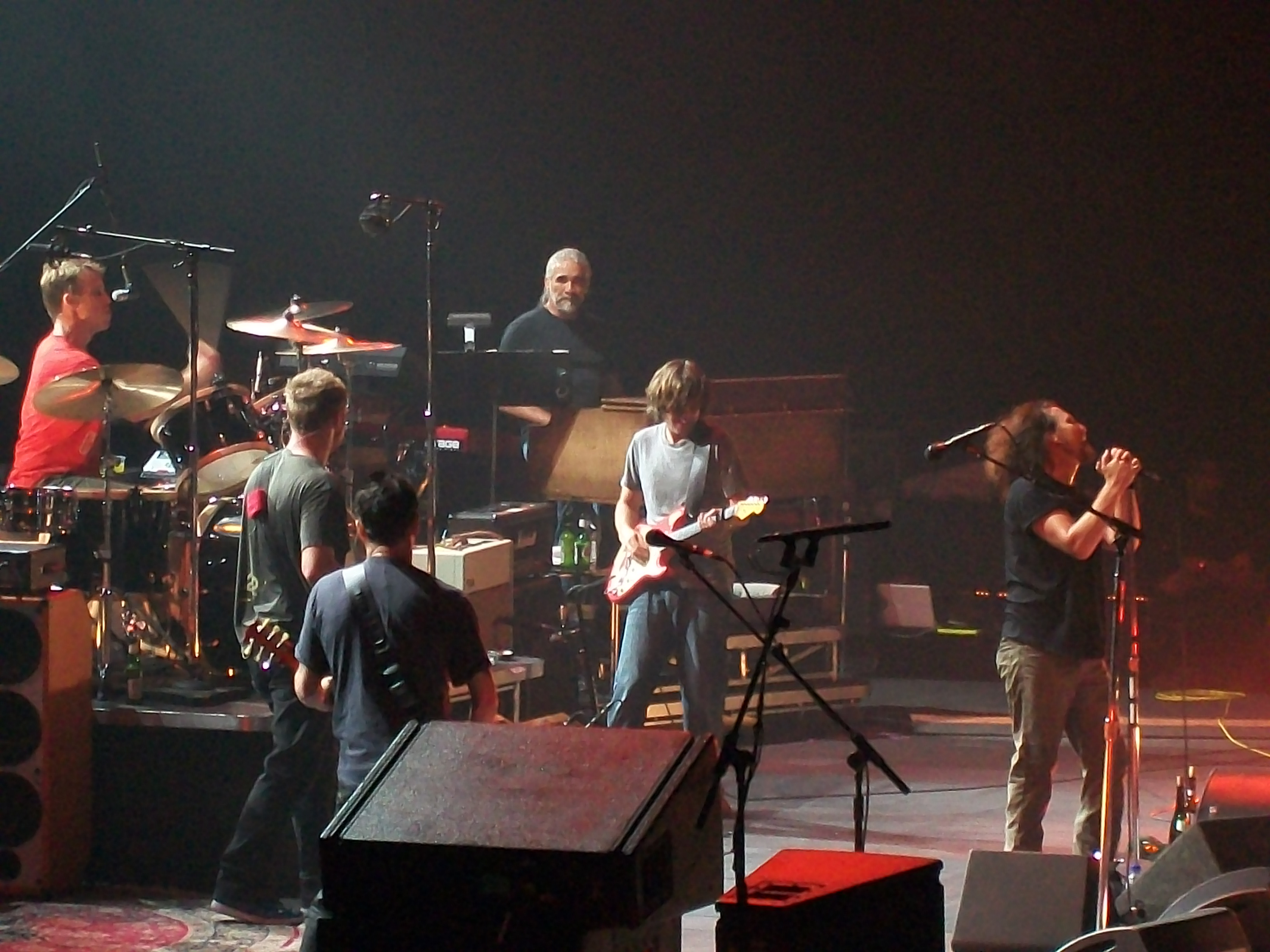
Pearl Jam and collaborator Boom Gaspar (keyboards) on the Backspacer Tour. Pictured in a semi-circle behind Eddie Vedder in this concert in Manchester, England on August 17, 2009, are: from L to R: Matt Cameron, Jeff Ament, Mike McCready, Boom Gaspar, and Stone Gossard

Pearl Jam promoted the album with tours in North America and Oceania in 2009. On October 4, 2009, the band headlined the Austin City Limits Music Festival. The appearance took place amidst a fourteen-date North American leg of the tour. Afterward, the band continued to tour in Oceania. In November 2009, they appeared in Australia, with their first performance in Perth, and after, gigs in Adelaide, Melbourne, Sydney and Brisbane. Their next concert performances followed in New Zealand. After their last date there, Pearl Jam returned to the United States for a final American leg in May 2010, and a European leg in June 2010.

=== Singles ===
The lead single "The Fixer" (backed with B-side "Supersonic", also from the album), was made available through the band's official website. "The Fixer" entered the Billboard Hot 100 at number 56 and reached number three on the Alternative Rock Tracks charts. A music video was made for "The Fixer". Footage from the video, directed by Cameron Crowe, was used for a commercial for Target advertising Backspacer which features "The Fixer". The song was also nominated for Best Rock Song at the 52nd Grammy Awards. The band also released the double a-side single "Got Some"/"Just Breathe" a month after Backspacer and "Amongst the Waves" the following summer.

== Critical reception ==
Professional ratings
Aggregate scores
Source	Rating
AnyDecentMusic?	7.1/10
Metacritic	79/100
Review scores
Source	Rating
AllMusic	4.5/5 stars
Entertainment Weekly	B
The Guardian	4/5 stars
Los Angeles Times	4/4 stars
The New York Times	mixed
Pitchfork	4.6/10
Q	4/5 stars
Rolling Stone	4/5 stars
Spin	8/10
Time	favorable

Backspacer received mainly positive reviews from music critics, and is the band's best reviewed studio album of the 2000s according to Metacritic, where it received a score of 79 out of 100 based on reviews from 24 professional critics. With 18 critics, the editors of AnyDecentMusic? rated Backspacer a 7.1 out of 10. AllMusic staff writer Stephen Thomas Erlewine gave the album four and a half out of five stars, saying that "it sounds as if they enjoy being in a band, intoxicated by the noise they make." Ann Powers of the Los Angeles Times gave the album four out of four stars, describing it as "11 breakneck rockers and candidly emotional ballads, adding up to barely more than a half hour of optimally toned catharsis" and praising the "lightness and dexterity of the playing" and "Vedder's hard-driving, often playful vocals", and called its music "Accessible without sacrificing sophistication, aggressive without flailing". Rolling Stone staff writer Rob Sheffield gave Backspacer four out of five stars, saying that it contains "the shortest, tightest, punkiest tunes they've ever banged out," and that "Eddie Vedder's heart-on-fire vocals are the main attraction, as always." He added, "After toughing out the Bush years, Pearl Jam aren't in the mood for brooding; at long last, surf's up." Dave Simpson of The Guardian also gave the album four out of five stars. In the review he stated that "the Seattle quartet have rarely sounded this energised". Simpson observed that "this is a record made by mature men with perspective: full of reflection and eclecticism, finding space for both U2 guitar motifs and Buzzcocks solos." He added that "the ninth Pearl Jam album may even be the best of the lot." Evan Sawdey of PopMatters gave the album a rating of 7/10 and wrote that Pearl Jam "have finally re-discovered who they are, and sound stronger than ever because of it".

Paul Brannigan of Q gave the album four out of five stars. He said the album is "largely characterised by joyous new wave-influenced rock'n'roll, and for the first time in their 19-year career, Pearl Jam actually sound—whisper it—fun. No, honestly." Josh Modell of Spin gave the album four out of five stars. He said, "For the first time in years, Pearl Jam are seizing the moment rather than wallowing in it." Time reviewer Josh Tyrangiel said, "The songs here are built on hooks, covered with guitar fuzz, and then trimmed back a bit so the melody abides." Tyrangiel added, "Nothing revolutionary, but Backspacer provides an adrenaline jolt that shouldn't be underestimated either." Leah Greenblatt of Entertainment Weekly gave the album a B, saying that Backspacer is "the sort of sweaty rock & roll that belongs in a bar with cracked-leather booths and $2 beers," and that it "grows same-y, but tracks like the surfing-as-life-metaphor anthem 'Amongst the Waves' do indeed make something old feel, if not new, good again." The New York Times said that "Pearl Jam... [refuses]—mostly—to equate maturity with slowing down," but added, "Pearl Jam's quandary is that with fewer outside targets or frustrations to rail against, it risks turning sanctimonious... Pearl Jam's music doesn't align well with satisfaction." Joshua Love of Pitchfork said that the album "seems to suggest in its tossed-off 37 minutes that Pearl Jam have no greater concern and regard for what they do than the rest of the world can muster," and he added that "with the spotlights long since extinguished, Pearl Jam seem content to do things by the book."

=== Accolades ===
At the 53rd Grammy Awards, Backspacer was nominated for Grammy Award for Best Rock Album, losing to Muse's The Resistance. Several year-end lists included the album amongst the best releases of 2009. AllMusic listed it on their Favorite Rock Albums of 2009, Billboard ranked it eighth on their Top 10 Albums of 2009, while Rolling Stone put Backspacer at 11th on their list, Popmatters had it as 31st, and Q on the 35th spot.

== Commercial performance ==
The album debuted at number one on the Billboard 200 with 189,000 copies sold in its first week of release, the only independent release to top the Billboard 200 that year. It is the first Pearl Jam album to reach number one in the United States since No Code debuted at number one in 1996. 7,000 of those copies were on vinyl, the highest first week total for LPs in 2009. On the Billboard 200 dated May 22, 2010, Backspacer logged its 32nd week on the chart, making the album Pearl Jam's longest-charting album since 1998's Yield. Backspacer was certified Gold by the RIAA on January 28, 2010 and has sold 635,000 copies as of July 2013, according to Soundscan. It also topped the charts in Canada, where it was certified Platinum; Australia, also going Platinum; and New Zealand, being certified Gold.

== Track listing ==
All lyrics are written by Eddie Vedder.

Backspacer track listing
No.	Title	Music	Length
1.	"Gonna See My Friend"	Vedder	2:47
2.	"Got Some"	Jeff Ament	3:01
3.	"The Fixer"	Matt Cameron, Mike McCready, Stone Gossard	2:57
4.	"Johnny Guitar"	Cameron, Gossard	2:49
5.	"Just Breathe"	Vedder	3:34
6.	"Amongst the Waves"	Gossard	3:57
7.	"Unthought Known"	Vedder	4:08
8.	"Supersonic"	Gossard	2:38
9.	"Speed of Sound"	Vedder	3:34
10.	"Force of Nature"	McCready	4:03
11.	"The End"	Vedder	2:55
Total length:			36:38

== Personnel ==
Pearl Jam

- Jeff Ament – bass guitar, layout design
- Matt Cameron – drums, percussion
- Stone Gossard – guitar
- Mike McCready – guitar
- Eddie Vedder – vocals, guitar, layout design; credited as "Jerome Turner" for album concept

Additional musicians

- Bruce Andrus – horn
- Justin Bruns – violin
- Richard Deane – horn
- Danny Laufer – cello
- Cathy Lynn – viola
- Brendan O'Brien – backing vocals, piano
- Christopher Pulgram – violin
- Susan Welty – horn

Production

- Brendan O'Brien – production, mixing
- Nick DiDia – recording
- Billy Bowers – additional engineering
- John Burton – additional engineering
- Tom Tapley – additional engineering
- Tom Syrowski – recording and mixing assistance (Henson)
- Steve Morrison – recording and mixing assistance (Southern Tracks)
- Bob Ludwig at Gateway Mastering – mastering
- John Golden – vinyl mastering
- Andy Fischer – layout design
- Eddie Horst – string and horn arrangements
- Patti Horst – copyist and contractor
- Neil Hundt – drum technician
- Tom Tomorrow – album concept, album art, layout design
- George Webb – guitar technician

== Charts ==
=== Weekly charts ===
Weekly chart performance for Backspacer
Chart (2009)	Peak position
Australian Albums (ARIA)	1
Austrian Albums (Ö3 Austria)	3
Belgian Albums (Ultratop Flanders)	6
Belgian Albums (Ultratop Wallonia)	9
Canadian Albums (Billboard)	1
Croatia (IFPI)	36
Danish Albums (Hitlisten)	5
Dutch Albums (Album Top 100)	3
Finnish Albums (Suomen virallinen lista)	11
French Albums (SNEP)	20
German Albums (Offizielle Top 100)	3
Hungarian Albums (MAHASZ)	33
Irish Albums (IRMA)	2
Italian Albums (FIMI)	4
Japanese Albums (Oricon)	34
Mexican Albums (Top 100 Mexico)	8
New Zealand Albums (RMNZ)	1
Norwegian Albums (VG-lista)	4
Portuguese Albums (AFP)	1
Scottish Albums (Official Charts)	5
Spanish Albums (Promusicae)	4
Swedish Albums (Sverigetopplistan)	13
Swiss Albums (Schweizer Hitparade)	5
UK Albums (Official Charts)	9
UK Rock & Metal Albums (Official Charts)	2
US Billboard 200	1
US Top Rock Albums (Billboard)	1

=== Year-end charts ===
Year-end chart performance for Backspacer
Chart (2009)	Position
Australian Albums (ARIA)	42
Belgian Albums (Ultratop Flanders)	78
Canadian Albums (Billboard)	47
Dutch Albums (Album Top 100)	58
Polish Albums (ZPAV)	83
US Billboard 200	90
US Top Rock Albums (Billboard)	24
Chart (2010)	Position
US Billboard 200	172
US Top Rock Albums (Billboard)	47

=== Singles ===
Chart performance for singles from Backspacer
Year	Title	Peak chart positions									
Year	Title	US	US Alt.	US Main.	US Rock	AUS	CAN	GER	JPN	NZ	UK
2009	"The Fixer"	56	3	10	2	22	14	97	78	11	93
2009	"Got Some"/"Just Breathe"	78	6	36	5	—	30	—	—	—	—
2010	"Amongst the Waves"	—	17	—	27	—	—	—	—	—	—

== Certifications ==
Certifications for Backspacer
Region	Certification	Certified units/sales
Australia (ARIA)	Platinum	70,000^{^}
Canada (Music Canada)	Platinum	80,000^{^}
Italy (FIMI)	Platinum	60,000^{*}
New Zealand (RMNZ)	Gold	7,500^{^}
Portugal (AFP)	Gold	10,000^{^}
United Kingdom (BPI)	Silver	60,000^{^}
United States (RIAA)	Gold	500,000^{^}
^{*} Sales figures based on certification alone.^{^} Shipments figures based on certification alone.

== See also ==
- List of 2009 albums
