= How Great Thou Art (Willie Nelson album) =

Studio album by Willie Nelson
- Released: Summer 1996
- Recorded: July 1996
- Genre: Country
- Length: 40:18
- Label: Fine Arts Records
- Producer: Willie Nelson, Fred Fletcher, Bobbie Nelson

Willie Nelson chronology
Spirit (1996)	How Great Thou Art (1996)	Hill Country Christmas (1997)

Professional ratings
Review scores
Source	Rating
Allmusic	3/5 stars

How Great Thou Art is a collaboration album by country singer Willie Nelson and his sister, Bobbie Nelson.

== Track listing ==
1. "How Great Thou Art" - 3:51
2. "Swing Low, Sweet Chariot" - 4:12
3. "It Is No Secret (What God Can Do)" - 5:17
4. "Kneel at the Feet of Jesus" - 2:34
5. "Just as I Am" - 3:40
6. "Just a Closer Walk With Thee" - 6:59
7. "Farther Along" - 5:21
8. "What a Friend We Have in Jesus" - 3:19
9. "In the Garden" - 5:05

== Personnel ==
- Willie Nelson - Guitar, vocals
- Jon Blondell - Bass
- Bobbie Nelson - Piano
