= In Color (song) =

Single by Jamey Johnson

from the album That Lonesome Song
- Released: March 31, 2008
- Genre: Country
- Length: 4:51 (album version); 4:11 (radio edit)
- Label: Mercury Nashville
- Songwriters: Jamey Johnson; Lee Thomas Miller; James Otto
- Producer: The Kent Hardly Playboys

Jamey Johnson singles chronology
"Rebelicious" (2006)	"In Color" (2008)	"High Cost of Living" (2009)

"In Color" is a song co-written and recorded by American country music artist Jamey Johnson. It was released in March 2008 as the first single from his 2008 album That Lonesome Song. Johnson co-wrote the song with James Otto and Lee Thomas Miller. In January 2009, "In Color" became Johnson's only Top 10 country hit with a peak at number 9.

The song won awards for Song of the Year in both the 2009 ACM Awards and the 2009 CMA Awards.

== Content ==
The song is a largely acoustic ballad centralizing on an elderly man who is showing black-and-white photographs to his grandson, each photograph showing a various part of the man's life. Describing the instances in each photos, such as fighting in World War II, the Great Depression and the day he and his wife first got married, he recalls his own life story to his grandson, telling him that "[he] should have seen it in color" (i.e., that the grandson would have had to have been there himself to understand what each experience was truly like). Trace Adkins was originally slated to record the song, until Johnson asked Adkins' permission to record the song himself. Adkins did record the song as an iTunes exclusive bonus track on his 2008 album, X. This story concept parallels the 2006 Carbon Leaf song "The War Was in Color".

== Music video ==
A music video was shot for "In Color" in May 2008. It portrays Johnson sitting on a stool, playing acoustic guitar and singing, with various black-and-white photographs (which Johnson borrowed from his grandmother) spread out on the floor around him. Eventually, color begins to sweep across the photos from the outside, working its way in until Johnson himself is also in color.

== Reception ==
=== Critical ===
Brady Vercher of Engine 145 gave the song a "thumb up". Vercher described the lyrics favorably, saying that they contained "vivid and emotive imagery without becoming overwrought" and that "[t]he production stays out of the way of the vivid stories and adds a richness and expressiveness […]." Vercher also went on to say, "Johnson may not be the most gifted vocalist as far as range goes, but he is more than capable and knows how to interpret a song for good effect. Needless to say, he nails the delivery in this song."

=== Commercial ===
"In Color" debuted at number 57 on the Hot Country Songs chart dated April 19, 2008. The song spent a total of 40 weeks as an active single on the country charts, and became the first Top 10 hit of Johnson's career, peaking at number 9 on the week of January 10, 2009. As of 2023, it remains Johnson's only Top 10 country single. In addition, the song peaked at number 52 on the Billboard Hot 100 the same week. The song was certified Gold by the Recording Industry Association of America (RIAA) on June 9, 2010. It has sold 1,340,000 copies in the United States as of February 2016. It ended up being certified 5× Platinum by RIAA in 2024.

== Awards and nominations ==
"In Color" won "Song of the Year" at the Academy of Country Music Awards on April 5, 2009. It was also nominated for Best Male Country Vocal Performance and Best Country Song at the 51st Grammy Awards.

== Chart performance ==
Chart (2008–2009)	Peak position
Canada Country (Billboard)	34
US Hot Country Songs (Billboard)	9
US Billboard Hot 100	52

=== Year-end charts ===
Chart (2008)	Position
US Country Songs (Billboard)	57

== Certifications ==
Region	Certification	Certified units/sales
United States (RIAA)	5× Platinum	5,000,000^{‡}
^{‡} Sales+streaming figures based on certification alone.
