= Heroes (Willie Nelson album) =

Studio album by Willie Nelson
- Released: May 15, 2012
- Studios: Pedernales Recording (Spicewood, Texas); Cannon Recording (Nashville, Tennessee); Sound Emporium (Nashville, Tennessee)
- Genres: Country, outlaw country
- Length: 58:31
- Label: Legacy
- Producer: Buddy Cannon

Willie Nelson chronology
Remember Me, Vol. 1 (2011)	Heroes (2012)	Let's Face the Music and Dance (2013)

Singles from Heroes
- 1. "Roll Me Up and Smoke Me When I Die" Released: April 20, 2012; 2. "Just Breathe" Released: April 21, 2012; 3. "Come On Back Jesus" Released: April 21, 2012

Heroes is the 60th studio album by American country music singer Willie Nelson, released by Legacy Recordings on May 15, 2012. Produced by Buddy Cannon, the album contains classic country songs, new songs written by Nelson and his son Lukas, and the classic song from Nelson's repertoire, "A Horse Called Music". Guest appearances include Lukas Nelson, Ray Price, Merle Haggard, Snoop Dogg, Kris Kristofferson, Jamey Johnson, Billy Joe Shaver, and Sheryl Crow.

A cover version of Coldplay's song "The Scientist", which was originally released as a single in 2011, was included in the album release after a major reception for a Chipotle Mexican Grill advertising aired during Super Bowl XLVI. Nelson's version plays during the closing credits of the 2014 movie The Judge.

The single "Roll Me Up and Smoke Me When I Die" was released on 420 day, and the tracks "Just Breathe" and "Come On Back Jesus" were released as singles during Record Store Day 2012.

Upon its release, it received favorable reviews. Heroes peaked at number four on Billboard's Top Country Albums and reached number 18 on the Billboard 200.

== Background and recording ==
Heroes was produced by Buddy Cannon. It was the first to be recorded and released by Nelson under his new contract with Sony Music. The album includes country music classics "My Window Faces the South", "Home In San Antone" and "Cold War With You", which Nelson sang with Ray Price. The album also includes original classics by Nelson and new songs by him and his son Lukas. Special guest appearances include Merle Haggard on "A Horse Called Music"; Snoop Dogg, Kris Kristofferson and Jamey Johnson on the track "Roll Me Up and Smoke Me When I Die", Billy Joe Shaver on "Come On Back Jesus" and Sheryl Crow on "Come On Up to the House". Nelson recorded three covers for the album; Pearl Jam's "Just Breathe", Coldplay's "The Scientist", and Tom Waits' "Come On Up to the House".

Originally, the album was named after the track "Roll Me Up and Smoke Me When I Die", but was then changed to Heroes after Nelson and his production team decided that the original name could deter conservative sale outlets. Lukas Nelson suggested recording Pearl Jam's "Just Breathe", while his brother Micah suggested "Come On Up To The House".

Most of the tracks on the album were recorded by engineer Steve Chadie at Nelson's Pedernales studio in Austin, Texas. "Hero", "Roll Me Up and Smoke Me When I Die" and "Come On Back Jesus" were recorded by Butch Carr at Cannon Productions and Sound Emporium Studios in Nashville, Tennessee.

== Release and reception ==
The cover of Coldplay's song "The Scientist", was originally released as a single in 2011. The song was included on Heroes after it gained public recognition for its use on a Chipotle restaurant television advertisement that was aired during Super Bowl XLVI. "Roll Me Up and Smoke Me When I Die" was released on April 20, 2012, to celebrate 420 day. The same day, Nelson performed the song live during the unveiling of his statue in Austin, Texas. The tracks "Just Breathe" and "Come On Back Jesus", were released as singles along with the non-album cut "Can I Sleep In Your Arms" during Record Store Day on April 21, 2012.

On May 12, 2012, the entire album was premiered on Nelson's channel Willie's Roadhouse on Sirius XM Radio. It was released on May 15. According to the aggregate score website Metacritic, it received "Generally favorable reviews" based on nineteen reviews, with a final score of 70/100.

Professional ratings
Aggregate scores
Source	Rating
Metacritic	70/100
Review scores
Source	Rating
AllMusic	3/5 stars
Consequence of Sound	3/5 stars
The Daily Telegraph	4/5 stars
Entertainment Weekly	B
The Independent	3/5 stars
MSN Music (Expert Witness)	B+
MusicOMH	4/5 stars
Rolling Stone	3/5 stars
Slant Magazine	3.5/5 stars
Toronto Sun	3.5/5 stars

Stephen Thomas Erlewine from AllMusic called the release "an appealingly misshapen collection of classics, contemporaries, and originals". Erlewine said that the contributions of Lukas Nelson were "a wee bit too much", but that the son of Nelson "contributes [to] a couple of the record's best songs". Erlewine mentioned Nelson's dispersity through the tracks, stating that he "has no innate editor ... but when he does connect, it's a wonder to behold". In a review for Consequence of Sound, Matthew Kauffman Smith criticized Nelson's decision to include many collaborations on the album, saying it was "Willie Nelson himself" that made his previous albums so enjoyable. Chet Flippo writing for Country Music Television said that Nelson "never fails to amaze", citing his capability of succeeding with more material. Flippo closed by writing that Nelson's "ear for a good song is as acute as it has ever been". The Chicago Reader favored the album, saying, "it's a mixed bag that aims for pop crossover, with high-profile cameos ... It sounds like a recipe for a terrible album, but the results are actually pretty good."

Rolling Stone rated the album with three stars out of five. Jody Rosen gave a positive review of the covers and the original songs, and said the track, "That’s All There Is to This Song", " ... makes you long for more Willie, less Willie and Friends". The Daily Telegraph praised the album, rating it with four stars out of five. The review was centered around Nelson's musical legacy and the collaboration of Lukas Nelson. The Telegraph's reviewer Neil McCormic wrote, "(Heroes) has the kind of last-will-and-testament quality". Nick Cristiano, writing in the Star Tribune, said that the participation of Lukas Nelson "lends the album an element of torch-passing, except Willie doesn't sound ready to fade away". Dave DiMartino of Yahoo! Music wrote a favorable review of the album, and said, "[Heroes is] one further indication that [Nelson] has an extraordinary talent that appeals to generations and people more diverse than any other artist out there".

Darry Sterdan of the Toronto Sun wrote a favorable review, and said about the selection of artists who collaborated on the album, "It sounds like a bummer, but thanks to Willie’s gentle charm and downhome wit, it’s mostly a hoot". Michael McCall of the Associated Press gave a negative review, saying that, "other than a remarkable take on Coldplay's "The Scientist," there's little that separates this album from Nelson's avalanche of releases". McCall said the cover songs were "all-over-the-map", that Snoop Dogg "croons tunelessly on 'Roll Me Up'", and that "[Lukas Nelson's] voice has Willie's reedy tone, but little of its musicality or range, making this collection less heroic than it could have been".

The New York Post praised the album and Nelson's inclusion of steel guitars in a context of classic country. Entertainment Weekly rated the release with a B, saying, "the music on Heroes is less diverse than Nelson's tastes suggest — it's all country lite — but there's a real warmth in his work with his kids". The Independent praised the inclusion of guests. The reviewer wrote, "the best thing here is opener 'A Horse Called Music', where wistful accordion and lachrymose pedal steel accompany Willie's duet with Merle Haggard, another Mount Rushmore voice". The reviewer also wrote, "Less welcome, though, is the way that vast tranches of the album serve as a showcase for Willie's son Lukas". Jeff Terich of American Songwriter said that the album "follows a similar pattern to most of his recent releases, offering up a populist mix of original compositions, covers of cowboy classics and contemporary songs in equal measure". Terich disdained the cover versions but praised Lukas Nelson's songwriting, stating that the songs "Every Time He Drinks He Thinks of Her" and "No Place to Fly" "[showcase] a winning earnestness, and an affecting second voice whose gentle warble could only come from the same bloodline".

== Track listing ==
No.	Title	Writer(s)	Length
1.	"A Horse Called Music" (featuring Merle Haggard and Lukas Nelson)	Wayne Carson	4:37
2.	"Roll Me Up" (featuring Snoop Dogg, Kris Kristofferson and Jamey Johnson)	Willie Nelson, Buddy Cannon, Rich Alves, John Colgin, Mike McQuerry	3:25
3.	"That's All There Is to This Song"	Buddy Cannon	3:01
4.	"No Place to Fly" (featuring Lukas Nelson)	Lukas Nelson	5:06
5.	"Every Time He Drinks He Thinks of Her" (featuring Lukas Nelson)	Lukas Nelson	2:48
6.	"Come on Up to the House" (featuring Lukas Nelson and Sheryl Crow)	Tom Waits, Kathleen Brennan	5:16
7.	"Hero" (featuring Billy Joe Shaver and Jamey Johnson)	Willie Nelson	4:38
8.	"My Window Faces the South" (featuring Lukas Nelson)	Jerry Livingston, Mitchell Parish, Abner Silver	2:32
9.	"The Sound of Your Memory" (featuring Lukas Nelson)	Lukas Nelson, Elizabeth Rainey	6:10
10.	"Cold War with You" (featuring Lukas Nelson and Ray Price)	Floyd Tillman	4:04
11.	"Just Breathe" (featuring Lukas Nelson)	Eddie Vedder	4:02
12.	"Home in San Antone" (featuring Lukas Nelson)	Fred Rose	4:09
13.	"Come on Back Jesus" (featuring Billy Joe Shaver, Lukas Nelson and Micah Nelson)	Willie Nelson, Buddy Cannon, Micah Nelson	3:24
14.	"The Scientist"	Guy Berryman, Jonny Buckland, Will Champion, Chris Martin	5:05
Total length:			58:37

== Singles ==
=== Roll Me Up and Smoke Me When I Die ===
"Roll Me Up and Smoke Me When I Die"

Single by Willie Nelson featuring Snoop Dogg, Kris Kristofferson and Jamey Johnson

from the album Heroes
- Released: April 20, 2012
- Recorded: 2011–12
- Genre: Country
- Length: 3:25
- Label: Legacy Recordings
- Songwriters: Willie Nelson, Buddy Cannon, Rich Alves, John Colgin and Mike McQuerry
- Producer: Buddy Cannon

Willie Nelson singles chronology
"The Scientist" (2011)	"Roll Me Up and Smoke Me When I Die" (2012)	"Just Breathe" (2012)

"Roll Me Up and Smoke Me When I Die" is a Willie Nelson single from his 2012 album Heroes. The song, written by Willie Nelson, Buddy Cannon, Rich Alves, John Colgin and Mike McQuerry, features guest vocals by Snoop Dogg, Kris Kristofferson and Jamey Johnson.

It was released on April 20, 2012 on 420 day, a counterculture holiday in North America related to cannabis culture. It became the first released single from the album. The same day, Nelson performed the song during the unveiling ceremony of his statue in Austin, Texas.

Initially, the album was to be named Roll Me Up and Smoke Me When I Die, after the single. The name was later changed to Heroes, after Nelson and his production team decided that the original name could deter some conservative sales outlets from carrying the album. Besides its regular release, the single was also made available in a green-colored 7" vinyl, in support of Record Store Day with a special previously unreleased solo version of the song performed by Willie Nelson.

- Side A: "Roll Me Up and Smoke Me When I Die" - Album version by Willie Nelson featuring Snoop Dogg, Jamey Johnson & Kris Kristofferson
- Side B: "Roll Me Up and Smoke Me When I Die" - Solo Version by Willie Nelson

== Credits ==
=== Musicians ===
- Willie Nelson – guitar, vocals
- Lukas Nelson – vocals, guitar, electric guitar
- Micah Nelson – vocals
- Billy Joe Shaver – vocals
- Ray Price – vocals
- Snoop Dogg – vocals
- Kris Kristofferson – vocals
- Merle Haggard – vocals
- Jamey Johnson – vocals
- Sheryl Crow – vocals
- Buddy Cannon – bass guitar and acoustic guitar, background vocals on "Heroes"
- Melonie Cannon – background vocals on "Heroes"
- Mickey Raphael – harmonica
- Butch Carr – synthesizer
- Steve Brewster – drums
- Jim Brown – piano, Wurlitzer, B-3 organ
- Tony Creasman – drums
- Kevin Grantt – bass
- Mike Johnson – steel guitar
- Lance Miller – background vocals on "Heroes"
- Paul Shaffer – B-3 organ
- Bobby Terry – electric guitar, acoustic guitar

=== Production ===
- Buddy Cannon – producer
- Butch Carr – engineer, mixing,
- Justin Stanley – engineer, mixing, producer
- Jeremy Brown – engineer
- T.W. Cargile – engineer
- John "Ace" Otten – engineer
- Brendan Bond – assistant engineer
- Gordon Hammond – assistant engineer
- Jared Dodd – assistant engineer
- Ryan Staples – assistant engineer
- Hunter Van Houten – assistant engineer
- Andrew Mendelson – mastering
- Frank Harkins – art direction, design, photography

== Chart performance ==
The album debuted at number four on Billboard's Top Country Albums chart, and number 18 on the Billboard 200. It sold 17,000 copies in the US in its debut week. In the UK, it debuted at No. 73 with 1,669 sold for the week.

== Charts ==
=== Weekly charts ===
Chart (2012)	Peak position
Australian Albums (ARIA)	79
Austrian Albums (Ö3 Austria)	34
Danish Albums (Hitlisten)	26
Dutch Albums (Album Top 100)	76
Norwegian Albums (VG-lista)	34
Scottish Albums (Official Charts)	53
Swedish Albums (Sverigetopplistan)	51
Swiss Albums (Schweizer Hitparade)	72
UK Albums (Official Charts)	73
UK Country Albums (Official Charts)	1
US Billboard 200	18
US Top Country Albums (Billboard)	4

=== Year-end charts ===
Chart (2012)	Position
US Top Country Albums (Billboard)	54
