= Remember Me, Vol. 1 =

Studio album by Willie Nelson
- Released: November 21, 2011
- Studio: Pedernales Recording (Spicewood, Texas)
- Genre: Country
- Label: R&J
- Producer: James Stroud

Willie Nelson chronology
Here We Go Again (2011)	Remember Me, Vol. 1 (2011)	Heroes (2012)

Remember Me, Vol. 1 is the 59th studio album by country music singer Willie Nelson, released on November 21, 2011. The tracks of the album consist of a selection of country music hits from the last 70 years.

Nelson and producer James Stroud were inspired to record the album while talking about Tex Williams' hit song "Smoke! Smoke! Smoke! (That Cigarette)". Nelson and Stroud elaborated a list of 75 songs that was later narrowed to 32.

The album was released to mixed reviews. It reached number 40 in Billboard's Top Country albums, while it reached number 37 in Billboard's Top Independent albums.

== Background and recording ==
The album consists of 14 tracks picked by Nelson from Billboard's country hits from the last 70 years. Nelson and producer James Stroud decided to record the album to summarize with different hits the history of country music. They were inspired to record the album while Stroud and Nelson were talking about Tex Williams' "Smoke! Smoke! Smoke! (That Cigarette)". Stroud recalled the first time he heard the song, and that he saw his mother smoking while it was being played. Nelson, who liked the anecdote, then suggested to record the album.

Nelson and Stroud had an initially list of 75 songs, that were narrowed to 32. They selected the key, and the ones that could be best applied to Nelson's style. Stroud went to Nashville and cut the tracks with studio musicians, and later traveled to Nelson's Pedernales studio in Austin, Texas to add his voice to the recordings. The 14 songs for the album were extracted from the sessions with Stroud that produced 32 songs, the rest were scheduled to be released in 2012 in the form of Remember Me, Vol. 2, but the recordings have yet to surface.

== Reception ==
"Remember Me (I’m The One Who Loves You)"
The title track of the album, written by Stuart Hamblen

Professional ratings
Aggregate scores
Source	Rating
Metacritic	65/100
Review scores
Source	Rating
AllMusic	3.5/5 stars
Country Weekly	3/5 stars
Los Angeles Times	3/4 stars
Rolling Stone	2.5/5 stars
Times Record News	A−
USA Today	3/4 stars

Los Angeles Times delivered a positive review: "Willie Nelson wraps his unmistakable vocal cords around 14 country hits spanning 1946 to 1989 [...] This time around, producer James Stroud envelops Nelson’s elastic voice in tasty, staunchly traditional arrangements [...] Nelson reminds us that his deceptively effortless vocal style can still touch the heart". USA Today wrote: "The concept sounds fail-safe: Country's beloved elder statesman applies his iconic dust-dry vocals to 14 classics handpicked from the Billboard charts. But it's tricky to make covers truly engaging. Here, he succeeds much more often than not [...] But overall, he does the canon proud."

Roughstock wrote: "Elegant and enduring endeavors are often the simplest, and so it is with Remember Me, Vol. 1 as one of America's most revered country music icons sings a collection of the genre's most definitive songs[...] In addition to Nelson's incomparable vocal stylings, each track benefits from the work of Nashville's top musicians in a band." Meanwhile, Nashville Country Club rated the album with four stars out of five, and praised Nelson: "The album stays true to Nelson's classic style and WIllie proves he's still got it." The Democrat and Chronicle wrote: "this collection of 14 pretty old country classics works much better. Nelson applies his easygoing delivery and one-of-a-kind voice [...] Nice touches abound."

Rolling Stone rated the album with two-and-a-half stars out of five, criticizing the backing and the performances of the selected material: "Nelson's voice is perfectly preserved, but an overstuffed band of Nashville pros provides stiff arrangements, and Willie has already released better versions of several tracks here. Nelson has been working on his first collection of new material in ages; hopefully that future is more inspiring than this version of the past." Meanwhile, Country Weekly wrote: "Willie puts his more idiosyncratic tendencies in check, delivering straightforward takes on 14 tunes that span roughly four decades [...] and offer an overview of old-school country’s versatility, evolution and lasting power [...] Those who favor Willie at his most freewheeling may find this collection a tad tame, perhaps even redundant. Still, its simple charms are numerous, with Willie in strong and unusually disciplined voice. The nimble musicians underscore him with taste and, when called for, gleeful and virtuosic abandon, and all parties involved take care to honor the original spirit of the songs they tackle here."

AllMusic rated the album with three-and-a-half stars out of five: "will undoubtedly have a lot of volumes following in its wake, since the premise is unlimited [...] backed by some of Nashville’s finest session musicians. each track has its own kind of hushed and easy-flowing grace to it."

Times Record News praised the album: "Also, the songs aren't recorded by the usual Family backup band, so they don't have the distinctive sound we've all come to expect from Willie's recordings. With some of the best Nashville studio pickers behind him, the backup arrangements are clean, tight and hot, and Willie has never sounded better."

== Track listing ==
No.	Title	Writer(s)	Length
1.	"Remember Me (I’m The One Who Loves You)"	Stuart Hamblen
2.	"Sixteen Tons"	Merle Travis
3.	"Why Baby Why"	Darrell Edwards, George Jones
4.	"Today I Started Loving You Again"	Merle Haggard, Bonnie Owens
5.	"I'm Movin' On"	Hank Snow
6.	"That Just About Does It"	Vern Gosdin, Max D. Barnes
7.	"This Old House"	Stuart Hamblen
8.	"Sunday Morning Coming Down"	Kris Kristofferson
9.	"Smoke! Smoke! Smoke! (That Cigarette)"	Merle Travis, Tex Williams
10.	"Slowly"	Webb Pierce
11.	"Satisfied Mind"	Red Hayes, Jack Rhodes
12.	"Roly Poly"	Fred Rose
13.	"Release Me"	Eddie Miller
14.	"Ramblin' Fever"	Merle Haggard

== Personnel ==
- Willie Nelson - vocals, guitar
- Mickey Raphael - harmonica
- Eddie Bayers - drums
- Sonny Garrish - steel guitar
- Aubrey Haynie - fiddle, mandolin
- John Hobbs - keyboards, piano
- David Hungate - Bass
- Brent Mason - electric guitar
- Biff Watson - acoustic guitar
- Wes Hightower - background vocals
- Chris Collins - guest appearance (Note: This is not the American nor NYC musician/producer of the same name; must be the one who plays in a John Denver tribute band.)

== Chart performance ==
Chart (2011)	Peak position
US Billboard Top Country Albums	40
US Billboard Top Independent Albums	37
