= December Day: Willie's Stash, Vol. 1 =

Studio album by Willie Nelson
- Released: December 2, 2014
- Studio: Pedernales Recording (Spicewood, Texas)
- Genre: Country
- Length: 1:00:51
- Label: Legacy Recordings
- Producer: Buddy Cannon

Willie Nelson chronology
Band of Brothers (2014)	December Day: Willie's Stash, Vol. 1 (2014)	Django & Jimmie (2015)

Singles from December Day: Willie's Stash, Vol. 1
- 1. "Who'll Buy My Memories" Released: November 21, 2014; 2. "Laws of Nature" Released: November 21, 2014; 3. "Summer of Roses / December Day" Released: December 5, 2014

December Day: Willie's Stash, Vol. 1 is a collaboration album by American country music singer-songwriter Willie Nelson and his sister, Bobbie Nelson, released by Legacy Recordings on December 2, 2014. It was the first release of Willie's Stash, a set of archival recordings curated by Nelson. Recorded with his road band, the album includes a track featuring Nelson's longtime bassist Bee Spears, deceased in 2011.

== Overview ==
The concept of the album was inspired by the jam performances on Nelson's bus between tour dates. Nelson, who sang and played guitar was accompanied by Bobbie on a travel-size piano while on the road. Recorded at Pedernales Recordings studio, the album was produced by Buddy Cannon and engineered by Steve Chadie. The liner notes were written by Mickey Raphael. The album includes two original songs newly written by Nelson, as well as new versions of old compositions. With the addition of covers, including Irving Berlin's "Alexander's Ragtime Band" and "What'll I Do".

== Release and reception ==
Professional ratings
Aggregate scores
Source	Rating
Metacritic	68/100
Review scores
Source	Rating
AllMusic	3.5/5 stars
The Austin Chronicle	3/5 stars
Blurt	4/5 stars
Cuepoint (Expert Witness)	A
Mojo	3/5 stars
The Music	3/5 stars
The Observer	3/5 stars
Record Collector	3/5 stars
Tom Hull – on the Web	B

Two singles of the album were released on November 21, 2014. "Laws of Nature" was premiered on Nelson's SiriusXM channel Willie's Roadhouse, while the single and video of "Who'll Buy My Memories" was premiered on Rolling Stone Country. The entire album was premiered on New York Times' website series Press Play on November 24. The video for "Laws of Nature" was premiered by Country Weekly on November 25.

December Day was released on December 2, 2014, to generally positive reviews from music critics. At Metacritic, which assigns a normalized rating out of 100 to reviews from mainstream critics, the album received an average score of 68, based on 8 reviews. In a review for The New York Times, Nate Chinen said "from start to finish, the Nelsons’ empathetic rapport — clarified by the supple strength of a long-running band — feels both welcoming and true." Neal Spencer of The Observer applauded December Day and felt that Nelson's "worn, almost conversational" vocals "remain arresting", while his guitar playing is "idiosyncratic". AllMusic's Mark Deming called Nelson and his sister's interplay "gentle" and "intuitive", remarking it as "one of the consistent pleasures of (Nelson's) body of work." In Cuepoint, Robert Christgau was disappointed in what he felt was a lack of memorable tunes at first listen, but still viewed December Day as both a showcase for Nelson's guitar playing and a "senescence album". He praised the "Senile Dementia Suite" of songs that concludes with "Laws of Nature", which he called "inescapably tuneful". Christgau named it the eleventh best album of 2014 in his year-end list for The Barnes & Noble Review Mojo was less enthusiastic and said the record is "a pleasant, charm-filled release but no great addition to the Nelson canon", while The Boston Globe lamented the slower songs, finding them monotonous.

== Personnel ==
- Willie Nelson - lead vocals, acoustic guitar
- Bobbie Nelson - piano, B-3 organ
- Mickey Raphael - harmonica
- Bee Spears - bass
- Kevin Smith - bass
- Billy English - drums, percussion
- David Zettner - acoustic guitar

== Track list ==
No.	Title	Writer(s)	Length
1.	"Alexander's Ragtime Band"	Irving Berlin	2:42
2.	"Permanently Lonely"	Willie Nelson	4:22
3.	"What'll I Do"	Irving Berlin	3:30
4.	"Summer of Roses" / "December Day"	Willie Nelson	3:11
5.	"Nuages"	Django Reinhardt	3:22
6.	"Mona Lisa"	Ray Evans, Jay Livingston	3:31
7.	"I Don't Know Where I Am Today"	Willie Nelson	2:26
8.	"Amnesia"	Willie Nelson	2:31
9.	"Who'll Buy My Memories"	Willie Nelson	2:47
10.	"The Anniversary Song"	Al Jolson, Saul Chaplin	2:13
11.	"Laws of Nature"	Willie Nelson	5:39
12.	"Walkin'"	Willie Nelson	5:41
13.	"Always"	Irving Berlin	2:40
14.	"I Let My Mind Wander"	Willie Nelson	3:09
15.	"Is the Better Part Over"	Willie Nelson	2:42
16.	"My Own Peculiar Way"	Willie Nelson	4:11
17.	"Sad Songs and Waltzes"	Willie Nelson	2:45
18.	"Où-es Tu, Mon Amour" / "I Never Cared For You"	Emile Stern, Henri LeMarchand / Willie Nelson	5:29
Total length:			01:00:51

== Chart performance ==
Chart (2014)	Peak position
US Top Country Albums (Billboard)	26
