= The Dollar (album) =

Studio album by Jamey Johnson
- Released: January 31, 2006
- Genre: Country
- Length: 41:51
- Label: BNA
- Producer: Buddy Cannon

Jamey Johnson chronology
They Call Me Country (2002)	The Dollar (2006)	That Lonesome Song (2008)

Singles from The Dollar
- 1. "The Dollar" Released: August 30, 2005; 2. "Rebelicious" Released: 2006

Professional ratings
Review scores
Source	Rating
Allmusic	4/5 stars
Entertainment Weekly	B−
Country Standard Time	

The Dollar is the debut studio album by American country music artist Jamey Johnson. Released in January 2006 on BNA Records, it features the single "The Dollar", which peaked at number 14 on the Billboard Hot Country Songs charts in early 2006. The second single, "Rebelicious", failed to chart, due to the merger of BMG and Sony Music Entertainment, and Johnson was dropped from BNA in mid-2006.

The track "She's All Lady" was also recorded by Joe Nichols on his 2007 album Real Things, while "Redneck Side of Me" was also recorded by Flynnville Train on their 2007 self-titled debut. The track "It Was Me" was also recorded by George Strait on his 2008 album Troubadour, and "Lead Me Home" was later recorded by its co-writer Randy Houser on his 2010 album They Call Me Cadillac.

== Track listing ==
No.	Title	Writer(s)	Length
1.	"The Dollar"	Jamey Johnson	2:59
2.	"Flying Silver Eagle"	Johnson; Dallas Davidson	4:27
3.	"She's All Lady"	Johnson; Davidson	3:44
4.	"Ray Ray's Juke Joint"	Wayd Battle; James Edwards	3:11
5.	"My Saving Grace"	Johnson; Rob Hatch; Jerrod Niemann	3:23
6.	"Redneck Side of Me"	Niemann	4:05
7.	"Keepin' Up with the Jonesin'" (duet with George Jones)	Johnson; Hatch	3:25
8.	"Rebelicious"	Johnson; Hatch; Niemann	3:15
9.	"Back to Caroline"	Johnson	4:16
10.	"It Was Me"	Buddy Cannon; Randy "Tiny" Hardison	3:10
11.	"Lead Me Home"	Randy Houser; Craig Monday	5:48

== Personnel ==
As listed in liner notes.

- Wayd Battle - electric guitar
- Jim "Moose" Brown - piano, B-3 organ, Wurlitzer
- Pat Buchanan - electric guitar
- J. T. Corenflos - electric guitar
- Chad Cromwell - drums
- Dan Dugmore - steel guitar, Dobro
- Steve Gibson - electric guitar
- Kevin "Swine" Grantt - bass guitar
- Rob Hajacos - fiddle
- Steve Hinson - steel guitar
- Jamey Johnson - lead vocals
- Kirk "Jelly Roll" Johnson - harmonica
- George Jones - vocals on "Keepin' Up with the Jonesin'"
- Randy McCormick - keyboards, piano, B-3 organ, Wurlitzer
- Gary Prim - piano
- Tom Roady - percussion
- David Talbot - banjo
- John Willis - acoustic guitar, banjo

=== Background vocalists ===
- Trenna Barnes
- Wyatt Beard
- Lisa Cochran
- Melodie Crittenden
- Everett Murphy Drake
- Duane Hamilton
- Melonie Cannon
- Jon Mark Ivey
- Marabeth Jordon
- Liana Manis
- Shane McDonnell
- Louis Dean Nunley
- Lisa Silver
- Kira Lynn Small
- Cindy Richardson-Walker
- D. Bergen White

== Chart performance ==
=== Album ===
Chart (2006)	Peak position
U.S. Billboard Top Country Albums	20
U.S. Billboard 200	87

=== Singles ===
Year	Single	Peak chart positions	
Year	Single	US Country	US
2005	"The Dollar"	14	101
2006	"Rebelicious"	—	—
"—" denotes releases that did not chart
