= Pedernales Country Club =

Complex in Texas

The Pedernales Country Club is a complex located in Lake Travis, 29 miles west of Austin, Texas, United States. Originally the Briarcliff Yacht and Golf Club, a nine-hole golf course constructed in 1968, it was purchased by country music singer-songwriter Willie Nelson in 1979. After the purchase, Nelson constructed a recording studio on the complex, designed by Chips Moman. The first recordings produced at the studio were Nelson's release Tougher Than Leather and his collaboration with Merle Haggard Pancho and Lefty.

In 1991, the club was auctioned following Nelson's debt with the Internal Revenue Service. The country club was originally purchased by Nelson's friend Darrell K Royal for safekeeping, but soon the IRS refunded Royal the money upon learning of the operation and resold the property to an Austin investor. With the help of a friend, Nelson retrieved the club the following year, upon agreeing to a higher payment. Throughout the years, Nelson has recorded several of his releases in the studio.

== History ==
The nine-hole golf course and buildings were designed by Frank Howard, who constructed the complex in 1968 as the "Briarcliff Yacht and Golf Club". The country club was constructed near Lake Travis, thirty miles west of Austin. By 1977, country music singer-songwriter Willie Nelson placed a bid on the bankrupt club, which was surpassed by another purchaser. Soon after, the development projects of the higher bidder were abandoned, and Nelson ultimately purchased the club for US$250,000 in 1979.

The following year, Nelson built a 5,400 square foot cabin; while he placed his family, musicians and roadies in the adjacent existing condominiums of the club. He hired Nashville producer Chips Moman to turn the restaurant and clubhouse into a private recording studio. Moman soon conditioned it to be a 48-track facility, with the works finished in six months. Nelson recorded for the debut of the studio his 1983 album Tougher Than Leather, which followed sessions by Webb Pierce, Roger Miller and Merle Haggard, who respectively cut records on the first days of the facility. In 1985, Nelson and Haggard recorded the album Pancho and Lefty.

In 1991, when Nelson's assets were sized by the Internal Revenue Service, the country club was auctioned. To avoid the club being sold to an unknown person, Nelson's friend, coach Darrell K Royal, persuaded Jim Bob Moffett, a supporter of the Texas Longhorns football program to lend him the US$117,000 that the IRS requested for the ranch. Moffett gave Royal the money, who was supposed to receive the club after the 120 days of the "right of redemption" by the IRS were over. Upon realizing that Royal bought the club for safekeeping, the IRS broke the deal, refunding him the money with a six percent interest. The country club was resold in May, and purchased by James Noryian of the company Investors International for US$230,000. The recording studio was auctioned separately from the club, and purchased by Nelson's nephew Freddy Fletcher. In 1992, with the help Johnny Herrington, an entrepreneur of Branson, Missouri, Nelson purchased the country club back from Noryian for US$470,000 to be paid in a period of three years.

Over the years, several of Nelson's releases were recorded at the studio, including Six Hours at Pedernales, Spirit, Rainbow Connection, Remember Me, Vol. 1 and Heroes, Let's Face the Music and Dance, Band of Brothers and December Day.
