= Melonie Cannon =

American singer (born 1973)

- Born: April 26, 1973 (age 53); Jackson, Tennessee
- Genres: Bluegrass music, country music
- Occupation: Musician
- Instruments: Vocals, guitar
- Years active: 1993–present
- Labels: Skaggs Family, Rural Rhythm
- Website: www.meloniecannon.com

Melonie Cannon is an American singer, blending country and bluegrass on her solo albums and session work. Willie Nelson said, "Melonie Cannon is one of the best singers I know."

== Biography ==
=== Early years ===
Cannon was born in Jackson, Tennessee, but her family moved to Nashville when she was three years old. She is the daughter of country music songwriter and producer Buddy Cannon, and the sister of songwriter Marla Cannon-Goodman.

At age 14, she began singing background vocals for artists such as John Michael Montgomery, George Jones, and Kenny Chesney. At age 16, she recorded a duet of "Cry Cry Darlin'" with Sammy Kershaw.

After a stint in the Army, she returned to Nashville to sing demos and help her father with his publishing and production companies. Ronnie Bowman heard her sing at Nashville's Station Inn, and helped her assemble a group of musicians to record with.

=== Solo recordings ===
Her self-titled debut album, released in 2004 on the Skaggs Family record label, was produced by Bowman, and featured a blend of bluegrass and country music. Guest artists included Stuart Duncan, Dan Tyminski, Barry Bales, Rob McCoury, Rob Ickes, Randy Kohrs, and Jerry Douglas.

In 2008, Cannon released And the Wheels Turn on Rural Rhythm. Cannon and Willie Nelson sang a duet on "Back To Earth." Dan Tyminski, Ronnie Bowman, and Sonya Isaacs provide vocals. The album was co-produced by Buddy Cannon and Bowman. Adam Steffey, Randy Kohrs, Tim Stafford, Wyatt Rice, Aubrey Haynie, Jody King, Barry Bales, and Deanie Richardson provide instrumental support.

=== Personal life ===
Cannon has been publicly forthcoming about her successful treatment of an addiction to prescription medications. She sought and received treatment via rehab and the support of friends and family.

== Discography ==
=== Solo albums ===
- 2004: Melonie Cannon (Skaggs Family)
- 2008: And the Wheels Turn (Rural Rhythm)

=== Also appears on ===
- 1993: Sammy Kershaw - Haunted Heart (Mercury)
- 1996: Steve Kolander - Pieces of a Puzzle (River North)
- 1999: Kenny Chesney - Everywhere We Go (BNA)
- 1999: Chely Wright - Single White Female (MCA Nashville)
- 2000: Craig Morgan - Craig Morgan (Atlantic)
- 2000: John Michael Montgomery - Brand New Me (Atlantic)
- 2002: Kenny Chesney - No Shoes, No Shirt, No Problems (BNA)
- 2006: Jamey Johnson - The Dollar (Sony Music)
- 2006: Sammy Kershaw - Honky Tonk Boots (Category 5)
- 2007: Kenny Chesney - Just Who I Am: Poets & Pirates (RCA)
- 2007: Philippe Cohen Solal - Moonshine Sessions (Ya Basta)
- 2008: Tim Hensley - Long Monday (Rural Rhythm)
- 2008: Willie Nelson - Moment of Forever (Lost Highway)
- 2010: Chad Brock - III (Warner Bros. Nashville)
- 2010: Chad Brock - Yes! (Warner Bros. Nashville)
- 2010: Jamey Johnson - The Guitar Song (Mercury Nashville)
- 2010: Sammy Kershaw - Better Than I Used to Be (Big Hit)
- 2011: Billy Ray Cyrus - I'm American (Buena Vista)
- 2011: Joe Nichols - It's All Good (Show Dog)
- 2011: Donny & Marie Osmond - Donny & Marie (MPCA)
- 2012: Kenny Chesney - Welcome to the Fishbowl (Blue Chair / Columbia)
- 2012: Sammy Kershaw - A Sammy Klaus Christmas (Big Hit)
- 2012: Jamey Johnson - Living for a Song: A Tribute to Hank Cochran (Mercury)
- 2012: Willie Nelson - Heroes (Sony Legacy)
- 2013: Kenny Chesney - Life on a Rock (Blue Chair / BNA)
- 2013: Willie Nelson - To All the Girls... (Sony Legacy)
- 2013: The Robertsons - Duck the Halls: A Robertson Family Christmas (EMI / Universal)
- 2015: Willie Nelson and Merle Haggard - Django and Jimmie (Sony Legacy)
- 2016: Bradley Walker - Call Me Old-Fashioned (Gaither / Universal)
- 2017: Alison Krauss - Windy City (Capitol)
- 2017: Willie Nelson - God's Problem Child (Sony Legacy)
- 2020: Sara Douga - Joe & Gin (self-published)
