= Living for a Song =

Living for a Song: A Tribute to Hank Cochran

Studio album by Jamey Johnson
- Released: October 6, 2012
- Genre: Country
- Length: 53:58
- Label: Mercury Nashville
- Producer: Buddy Cannon, Dale Dodson

Jamey Johnson chronology
The Guitar Song (2010)	Living for a Song: A Tribute to Hank Cochran (2012)	The Christmas Song (2014)

Professional ratings
Aggregate scores
Source	Rating
Metacritic	84/100
Review scores
Source	Rating
AllMusic	4/5 stars
American Songwriter	3.5/5 stars
The Austin Chronicle	4/5 stars
The A.V. Club	A−
Entertainment Weekly	B
Mojo	4/5 stars
MSN Music (Expert Witness)	A−
Rolling Stone	4/5 stars
Slant Magazine	4/5 stars
Uncut	9/10

Living for a Song: A Tribute to Hank Cochran is the fourth studio album by American country music singer Jamey Johnson. It was released in October 2012 via Mercury Nashville on both compact disc and LP record. The album is a tribute to songwriter Hank Cochran.

== Critical reception ==
Thom Jurek of AllMusic rated the album 4 stars out of 5, saying that "Johnson doesn't attempt to draw attention to himself, but instead, presents a series of excellent performances of Cochran's songs with himself as an anchor." American Songwriter's Stephen Deusner rated it 3½ stars, saying that Johnson and the others involved "treat these songs gingerly, even going so far as to gently re-create the countrypolitan arrangements of the originals. If that makes the album sound overly familiar at times, it also means Johnson never strains to update these songs or argue for their relevance." He criticized the album's length, and thought that it could have used younger artists for variety. Along with strong critical acclaim, the album was nominated for the Grammy Award for Best Country Album.

== Track listing ==
No.	Title	Writer(s)	Guest vocals	Length
1.	"Make the World Go Away"	Hank Cochran	Alison Krauss	3:04
2.	"I Fall to Pieces"	Cochran; Harlan Howard	Merle Haggard	4:42
3.	"A Way to Survive"	Cochran; Moneen Carpenter	Vince Gill; Leon Russell	3:02
4.	"Don't Touch Me"	Cochran	Emmylou Harris	3:17
5.	"You Wouldn't Know Love"	Cochran; Dave Kirby	Ray Price	2:43
6.	"I Don't Do Windows"	Cochran	Ray Benson of Asleep at the Wheel	3:23
7.	"She'll Be Back"	Cochran; Dale Dodson; Red Lane	Elvis Costello	2:45
8.	"Would These Arms Be in Your Way"	Cochran; Vern Gosdin; Lane		3:38
9.	"The Eagle"	Cochran; Lane; Mack Vickery	George Strait	3:10
10.	"A-11"	Cochran	Ronnie Dunn	2:20
11.	"I'd Fight the World"	Cochran; Joe Alison	Bobby Bare	3:25
12.	"Don't You Ever Get Tired of Hurting Me"	Cochran	Willie Nelson	5:08
13.	"This Ain't My First Rodeo"	Cochran; Gosdin; Max D. Barnes	Lee Ann Womack	3:21
14.	"Love Makes a Fool of Us All"	Cochran; Glenn Martin	Kris Kristofferson	3:14
15.	"Everything but You"	Cochran; Willie Nelson	Vince Gill; Willie Nelson; Leon Russell	3:34
16.	"Living for a Song"	Cochran; Bo Roberts; David James Holster	Hank Cochran; Merle Haggard; Kris Kristofferson; Willie Nelson	3:12
Total length:				53:58

== Personnel ==
Musicians

- Bobby Bare – vocals on "I'd Fight the World"
- Ray Benson – electric guitar and vocals on "I Don't Do Windows"
- Zeneba Bowers – violin
- Jim "Moose" Brown – acoustic guitar, piano
- Buddy Cannon – upright bass, background vocals
- Melonie Cannon – background vocals
- Jim Chapman – background vocals
- Hank Cochran – vocals on "Living for a Song"
- Elvis Costello – vocals on "She'll Be Back"
- Chad Cromwell – drums
- Dennis Crouch – upright bass
- Janet Darnell – violin
- David Davidson – violin
- Floyd Domino – piano
- Ronnie Dunn – vocals on "A-11"
- Larry Franklin – fiddle
- Steve Gibson – electric guitar
- Vince Gill – vocals on "A Way to Survive" and "Everything but You"
- Kevin "Swine" Grantt – upright bass
- Jim Grosjean – viola
- Merle Haggard – vocals on "I Fall to Pieces" and "Living for a Song"
- Emmylou Harris – vocals on "Don't Touch Me"
- Stephen Hill – background vocals
- John Hobbs – string arrangements
- Jamey Johnson – acoustic guitar, lead vocals, background vocals
- Shelby Kennedy – background vocals
- Alison Krauss – vocals on "Make the World Go Away"
- Kris Kristofferson – vocals on "Love Makes a Fool of Us All" and "Living for a Song"
- Red Lane – gut string guitar on "Would These Arms Be in Your Way"
- "Cowboy" Eddie Long – steel guitar
- Kenny Malone – percussion
- Liana Manis – background vocals
- Brent Mason – electric guitar, tic tac bass
- David Miller – bass guitar
- Willie Nelson – acoustic guitar and vocals on "Do You Ever Get Tired (Of Hurting Me)", "Everything but You", and "Living for a Song"
- Stefan Petrescu – violin
- Ray Price – vocals on "You Wouldn't Know Love"
- Carole Rabinowitz – cello
- Mickey Raphael – harmonica
- Sarighandi D. Reist – cello
- Eddie Rivers – steel guitar
- Jason Roberts – fiddle
- Leon Russell – vocals on "A Way to Survive" and "Everything but You"
- John Wesley Ryles – background vocals
- David Sanger – drums
- Hank Singer – fiddle
- Pamela Sixfin – violin
- Joe Spivey – fiddle
- George Strait – vocals on "The Eagle"
- Bobby Terry – acoustic guitar, electric guitar
- Wei Tsun Chang – violin
- Robby Turner – dobro, steel guitar
- Dan Tyminski – acoustic guitar
- Tommy White – steel guitar
- Kris Wilkinson – string contractor, viola
- Lonnie Wilson – drums
- Karen Winkleman – violin
- Lee Ann Womack – vocals on "This Ain't My First Rodeo"
- Bobby Wood – Fender Rhodes, synthesizer, Wurlitzer
- Glenn Worf – upright bass

Production

- Shelly Anderson – mastering assistant
- Daniel Baciagalupi – mastering assistant
- Venus Barr – production assistant
- Drew Bollman – engineer
- Paul Bowman – assistant engineer
- Sorrel Brigman – assistant engineer
- Buddy Cannon – producer
- T.W. Cargile – engineer, mixing
- Butch Carr – engineer
- Tony Castle – engineer
- Steve Chadie – engineer
- Dale Dodson – producer
- Leland Elliott – assistant engineer
- Shannon Finnegan – production coordinator
- Angella Grossi – production assistant
- Will Harrison – assistant engineer
- Jonathan Harter – assistant engineer
- Jon Hersey – assistant engineer
- Rob Katz – assistant engineer, engineer
- Charlie Kramsky – assistant engineer
- Andrew Mendelson – mastering
- Seth Morton – assistant engineer
- Willie Nelson – drum triggers
- Chris Owens – assistant engineer
- Matt Rausch – assistant engineer
- David Robinson – assistant engineer
- Jacob Sciba – assistant engineer
- Sam Seifert – engineer
- Brian Wright – executive producer
- Nathan Yarborough – assistant engineer

== Charts ==
=== Weekly charts ===
Chart (2012)	Peak position
US Billboard 200	5
US Top Country Albums (Billboard)	3

=== Year-end charts ===
Chart (2012)	Position
US Top Country Albums (Billboard)	74
Chart (2013)	Position
US Top Country Albums (Billboard)	71
