= The Dollar (song) =

Single by Jamey Johnson

from the album The Dollar
- Released: August 30, 2005
- Genre: Country
- Length: 2:59
- Label: BNA
- Songwriter: Jamey Johnson
- Producer: Buddy Cannon

Jamey Johnson singles chronology
"The Dollar" (2005)	"Rebelicious" (2006)

"The Dollar" is the debut single by American country music artist Jamey Johnson. It was released in August 2005 and is the title track of his debut album The Dollar. The song reached number 14 on Billboard Hot Country Singles in early 2006, and was the only charting single from the album.

== Background and writing ==
Johnson was inspired to write the song after taking a job as a construction worker, thus causing him to be away from his own young daughter for two months.

== Content ==
The song is a mid-tempo composition accompanied largely by acoustic guitar and steel guitar. Its central character is a child who, upon seeing his father leaving for work, asks his mother why the father has to go to work. The mother then explains that, at work, they "pay him for his time," thus encouraging the boy to gather a dollar's worth of coins from his personal collection, in an attempt to buy some time from his father. After the young son has gathered the money, the mother calls up the father, saying, "You don't have to chase that dollar, 'cause your little man has got one here at home."

== Chart performance ==
"The Dollar" debuted at number 50 on Billboard's Hot Country Songs for the chart week of September 3, 2005. The single reached its peak of number 14 for the week of March 14, 2006, where it stayed for two weeks.

Chart (2005–2006)	Peak position
Canada Country (Radio & Records)	21
US Hot Country Songs (Billboard)	14
US Billboard Bubbling Under Hot 100	1
