= Jamey Johnson =

American country musician (born 1975)

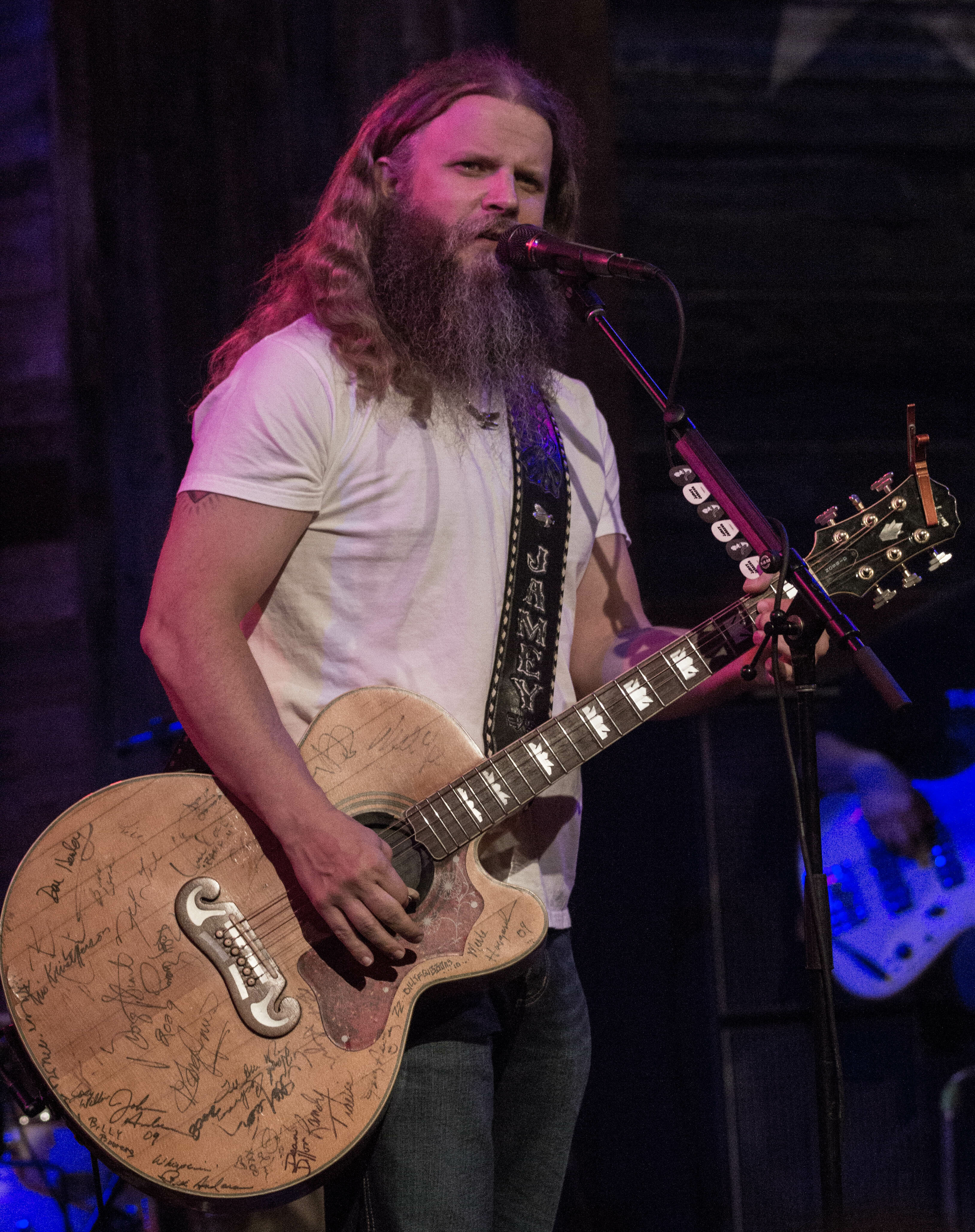
- Johnson in 2016

Background information
- Born: July 14, 1975 (age 50); Enterprise, Alabama, U.S.
- Origin: Montgomery, Alabama, U.S.
- Genres: Country; outlaw country
- Occupation: Singer-songwriter
- Instruments: Vocals, guitar
- Years active: 2005–present
- Labels: BNA, Mercury Nashville, Big Gassed
- Website: jameyjohnson.com

Jamey Johnson (born July 14, 1975) is an American country music singer and songwriter.

Signed to BNA Records in 2005, Johnson made his debut with his single "The Dollar", the title track to his 2006 album The Dollar. He was dropped from BNA in 2006 and signed to Mercury Nashville Records in March 2008, releasing his second album, the gold-certified That Lonesome Song. This album produced two singles, the top 10 hit "In Color" and "High Cost of Living". Johnson has since released two more albums, The Guitar Song in 2010 and Living for a Song: A Tribute to Hank Cochran in 2012. In 2014, he released a five-song Christmas EP titled The Christmas Song. In addition to most of his own material, Johnson has co-written singles for Willie Nelson and Merle Haggard, Trace Adkins, George Strait, James Otto, Joe Nichols, and Jessie James Decker.

== Early life ==
Johnson was born on July 14, 1975, in Enterprise, Alabama, and raised in Montgomery, Alabama. From an early age, he was influenced by country acts such as Alabama and Alan Jackson; the latter was the first act he saw in concert. After graduating from Jefferson Davis High School, Johnson attended Jacksonville State University, the same university from which Alabama lead singer Randy Owen graduated. During his time at Jacksonville State, he was a member of the Marching Southerners.

Johnson quit college after two years and served in the United States Marine Corps Reserve for eight years. While in the Marines, he began playing country music in various bars in the Montgomery area; one of his first gigs was opening for David Allan Coe. By 2000, Johnson had moved to Nashville, Tennessee, to pursue a career in country music. One of his first connections was with Greg Perkins, a fiddler who had played for Tanya Tucker, Tammy Wynette, and other artists. Perkins invited Johnson to sing as a duet partner with Gretchen Wilson on a demo tape. Songs for which Johnson sang demos include "Songs About Me" (cut by Trace Adkins) and "That's How They Do It in Dixie" (cut by Hank Williams, Jr. with Big & Rich, Gretchen Wilson, and Van Zant).

Johnson had also made connections with producer and songwriter Buddy Cannon, who helped him land a songwriting contract. Among Johnson's first cuts as a songwriter was "Honky Tonk Badonkadonk", which Adkins released from his 2005 album Songs About Me. That song he co-wrote along with hit songwriter Dallas Davidson and fellow country singer-songwriter Randy Houser, who later worked with Johnson again, co-writing "My Cowboy" for country pop singer Jessie James for her self-titled debut album.

== Personal life ==
On November 17, 2024, Johnson was pulled over for speeding by Tennessee Highway Patrol in Williamson County. It was reported that during the traffic stop, Johnson was found in possession of "several Ziploc bags of marijuana and pre-rolled joints". Johnson was subsequently arrested on a felony drug charge for possession of marijuana. This class E felony charge can result in one to six years in prison, and up to a $5,000 fine.

Johnson's case was dismissed on April 15, 2026, according to Williamson County online court records.

Johnson has previously been candid about his sobriety journey, stating he has not had a drink of alcohol since 2011. He also stated he stopped smoking "pot" in 2015, however admits that many years later he resumed smoking and still occasionally partakes in the substance.

== Career ==
=== Career beginnings and That Lonesome Song (2005–2009) ===
By 2005, Johnson had been signed to a recording contract with BNA Records. His first single, entitled "The Dollar", was released that year, followed by his Buddy Cannon-produced debut album (also entitled The Dollar) in March 2006. "The Dollar" went on to peak at No. 14 on Billboard Hot Country Songs. The album's second single, "Rebelicious", failed to make the chart, and Johnson was dropped from BNA.

After the loss of his record deal, Johnson divorced his wife and took on a reclusive lifestyle, residing in a friend's house while working on his songwriting. He wrote several songs for other artists. In 2006, George Strait reached No. 1 on the Country chart with "Give It Away", a song which Johnson co-wrote with Bill Anderson and Cannon. This song became Strait's 51st No. 1 on the Billboard country charts, setting a new record for most No. 1s on that chart.

In 2007, Trace Adkins charted with two more songs that Johnson co-wrote: "Ladies Love Country Boys" and "I Got My Game On", the former being Adkins' first No. 1 in 10 years. Also in 2007, Joe Nichols reached Top 20 with "Another Side of You", another song co-written by Johnson. This song was the first single on Nichols's album Real Things, which also contained "She's All Lady", a song that Johnson originally recorded on The Dollar.

Johnson was part of the Fox TV television series Nashville, which was cancelled after two episodes in September 2007.

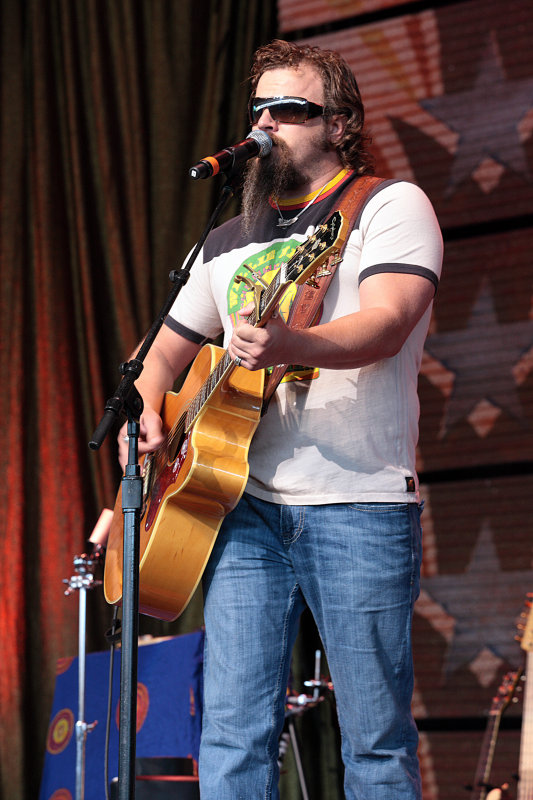
Johnson performing in 2008

Johnson released an album in 2008, That Lonesome Song, which was only made available online. The album drew the attention of Mercury Nashville Records, who signed him to a record deal in 2008. His first single for the label, "In Color", was released in March 2008. This song, which Johnson co-wrote with Lee Thomas Miller and James Otto, entered the Top 40 in June 2008, and That Lonesome Song was released on CD in August of that year. "In Color" peaked at No. 9 on the Country chart in January 2009 and was followed a month later by "High Cost of Living", which managed to crack the Top 40, but only reaching No. 34. By April 2009, That Lonesome Song was certified Gold by the RIAA.

A fifth single, "My Way to You", was issued in July 2009. The song was released to the radio on July 13, 2009, and debuted at No. 56 on the U.S. Billboard Hot Country Songs chart. The song peaked at No. 52 in September 2009.

Johnson was nominated for the 2009 CMA Awards New Artist of the Year, and has been nominated for the 2010 Academy of Country Music Top New Solo Vocalist.

=== The Guitar Song (2010–2012) ===
In 2010, Johnson released a follow-up to his 2008 album, That Lonesome Song. The album titled The Guitar Song was released on September 14, 2010. Upon its release, The Guitar Song was met with overwhelming praise and universal acclaim from music critics. The album debuted at number four on the U.S. Billboard 200 and number one on the U.S. Billboard Top Country Albums, selling 63,000 copies its first week of release.

Johnson released three singles from the album, including "Playing the Part", in summer 2010. The music video for the single was released in October, and was directed by Matthew McConaughey, who also stars in the video as a dancing gorilla.

Johnson was the supporting act on Kid Rock's 2011 Born Free Tour, accompanying Rock on a duet or two during most concerts. He was also a main stage act on Willie Nelson's Country Throwdown from May to July 2011.

=== Living for a Song and new label (2012–present) ===
In addition to producing other acts and writing new material, Johnson released his fourth studio album titled Living for a Song: A Tribute to Hank Cochran on October 6, 2012. The album is a tribute to songwriter Hank Cochran. The album garnered Johnson a nomination at the 55th Grammy Awards for Best Country album. The album paired him with acts such as Ray Price, Willie Nelson, Alison Krauss, Emmylou Harris, Elvis Costello, George Strait, Vince Gill, and Merle Haggard. Longtime collaborator and producer Buddy Cannon oversaw the project. The album was released on vinyl September 25, 2012, and other formats on October 16, 2012.

Following a dispute with his label, Johnson founded his own label, Big Gassed Records. His first release on the label was a Christmas-themed EP, The Christmas Song, including several covers and one new original song, which was released in November 2014. It was announced that more new music would follow in 2015. In January 2015, Johnson released a new song, "Alabama Pines" as a free download. This was followed by the release of another single, "You Can", in February.

In a 2017 interview, Johnson stated that he had been having more difficulty with songwriting after an incident about seven years prior when he received a concussion due to slipping on ice and hitting his head. In 2019, Johnson played alongside Don Was, Warren Haynes, Lukas Nelson, and Cyril Neville on The Last Waltz Tour, a live celebration of The Band's 1976 farewell show at the Winterland Ballroom, also known as The Last Waltz.

On March 19, 2022, Bill Anderson invited him to become a member of the Grand Ole Opry, which he accepted; Johnson had performed regularly on the show for the previous seventeen years. He was inducted on May 14, 2022.

On December 15, 2023, Johnson gave the commencement speech to the 2023 Fall graduating class of Jacksonville State University and received an honorary doctorate from the school. Alabama Governor Kay Ivey proclaimed December 15 Jamey Johnson Day.

== Discography ==
=== Studio albums ===
Title	Album details	Peak chart positions		Certifications (sales threshold)
Title	Album details	US Country	US	Certifications (sales threshold)
They Call Me Country	Release date: October 21, 2002; Label: self-released	—	—	
The Dollar	Release date: January 31, 2006; Label: BNA Records	20	87	
That Lonesome Song	Release date: August 5, 2008; Label: Mercury Nashville	6	28	US: 2× Platinum
The Guitar Song	Release date: September 14, 2010; Label: Mercury Nashville	1	4	US: Gold
Living for a Song: A Tribute to Hank Cochran	Release date: October 16, 2012; Label: Mercury Nashville	3	5	
Midnight Gasoline	Release date: November 8, 2024; Label: Warner Nashville	—	—	
"—" denotes releases that did not chart

=== Extended plays ===
Title	Album details	Peak positions
Title	Album details	US Country
The Christmas Song	Release date: November 19, 2014; Label: Big Gassed Records	43

=== Singles ===
Year	Single	Peak chart positions		Sales	Certifications (sales threshold)	Album
Year	Single	US Country	US	Sales	Certifications (sales threshold)	Album
2005	"The Dollar"	14	—^{A}			The Dollar
2006	"Rebelicious"	—	—			The Dollar
2008	"In Color"	9	52	US: 1,340,000	US: 5× Platinum	That Lonesome Song
2009	"High Cost of Living"	34	—		US: Platinum	That Lonesome Song
2009	"My Way to You"	52	—			The Guitar Song
2010	"Playing the Part"	39	—			The Guitar Song
2011	"Heartache"	51	—			The Guitar Song
2012	"Living for a Song"	—	—			Living for a Song: A Tribute to Hank Cochran
2015	"Alabama Pines"	—	—			—N/a
2015	"You Can"	—	—			—N/a
"—" denotes releases that did not chart

- ^{A}"The Dollar" did not enter the Billboard Hot 100, but peaked on the Bubbling Under Hot 100 Singles chart at number one.

=== Other certified songs ===
Year	Single	Certifications (sales threshold)	Album
2008	"That Lonesome Song"	US: Gold	That Lonesome Song
2008	"Between Jennings and Jones"	US: Gold	That Lonesome Song

=== Music videos ===
Year	Video	Director
2006	"The Dollar"	Wes Edwards
2008	"In Color"	Shaun Silva
2008	"Mowin' Down the Roses"	Unknown
2010	"High Cost of Living"	Clifton Collins Jr.
2010	"Bad Angel" (with Dierks Bentley and Miranda Lambert)	George Flanigen
2010	"Playing the Part"	Matthew McConaughey

== Other appearances ==
Year	Title	Album
2010	"Cold Beer" (with Colt Ford)	Ride Through the Country
2010	"Bad Angel" (with Dierks Bentley and Miranda Lambert)	Up on the Ridge
2010	"Cover of The Rolling Stone" (with Sammy Kershaw)	Better Than I Used to Be
2010	"Four Walls Of Raiford"	Sweet Home Alabama: A Country Tribute to Lynyrd Skynyrd
2011	"This Time"	Music Inside – Collaboration Dedicated to Waylon Vol 1
2011	"The Day Hank Jr. Came To Town" (with Tonya Watts)	Handcuff My Soul
2011	"Some Gave All" (with Billy Ray Cyrus, Darryl Worley, and Craig Morgan)	I'm American
2011	"Orange Man" (with Alexander King and Kris Kristofferson)	Music Saved My Life EPK
2011	"Yesterdays Wine" (with Blackberry Smoke and George Jones)	Little Piece of Dixie (2010 Deluxe edition)
2011	"Two Outta' Three Ain't Bad"	Imus Ranch Record II
2011	"Have Thine Own Way Lord" (with The Blind Boys of Alabama)	Take The High Road
2011	"La Grange"	ZZ Top: A Tribute from Friends
2011	"A Few Old Country Boys"(with Randy Travis)	Anniversary Celebration
2012	"You Better Treat Your Man Right " (with Chuck Mead)	Back at the Quonset Hut
2012	"Hero" (with Willie Nelson and Billy Joe Shaver)	Heroes
2012	"Roll Me Up and Smoke Me When I Die" (with Willie Nelson, Snoop Dogg, and Kris Kristofferson)	Heroes
2012	"Sunday Morning Coming Down" (with Kris Kristofferson)	We Walk The Line: A Celebration of the Music of Johnny Cash
2012	"The Highwaymen" (with Kris Kristofferson, Shooter Jennings, and Willie Nelson)	We Walk The Line: A Celebration of the Music of Johnny Cash
2013	"My Home's In Alabama"	Alabama & Friends
2013	"Rebel Soldier"	Divided & United: The Songs of the Civil War
2014	"The Git Go" (with Willie Nelson)	Band of Brothers
2015	"If I Was Over You" (with Amanda Watkins)	*
2015	"Brain Cloudy Blues" (with Ray Benson)	Still the King: Celebrating the Music of Bob Wills and His Texas Playboys
2015	"Old Wore out Cowboys" (with Willie Nelson & Ward Davis )	15 Years in a 10 Year Town
2016	"Actin' Crazy" (with Randy Rogers Band)	Nothing Shines Like Neon
2016	"Mama's Table"	Dave Cobb's Southern Family
2017	"Freedom To Stay"	Outlaw: Celebrating the Music of Waylon Jennings
2017	"I Ain't The One" (with Alison Krauss)	Outlaw: Celebrating the Music of Waylon Jennings
2017	"Highwaymen" (with Shooter Jennings, Kris Kristoferson, and Willie Nelson )	Outlaw: Celebrating the Music of Waylon Jennings
2017	"Luckenbach, Texas (Back to the Basics of Love)" (with Shooter Jennings, Ryan Bingham, Kacey Musgraves, Lee Ann Womack, Chris Stapleton Alison Krauss, Toby Keith Kris Kristoferson, and Willie Nelson, (Eric)	Outlaw: Celebrating the Music of Waylon Jennings
2018	"The Ghost of Macon Jones" (with Joe Bonamassa)	Redemption
2018	"Spirit Rider"	Forever Words
2018	"Everybody Wants to Be Twenty-One" (with Bill Anderson)	Anderson
2018	"Wrong End Of The Rainbow" (with Chris Hennessee)	Ramble
2018	"Husbands and Wives" (with Emmylou Harris)	King of the Road: A Tribute to Roger Miller
2018	"It Hurts Me Too"	Strange Angels: In Flight with Elmore James
2019	"The Fields Of Athenry"	The Great Irish Songbook
2020	"Ladies Love Outlaws" (with Mickey Lamantia)	Honky Tonk Confessions: The Final Chapter
2020	"The Cock Crows" (with Mo Pitney)	Ain't Lookin' Back
2020	"A Music Man" (with Nick Norman)	Nick Norman
2020	"Some Gave All" (with Billy Ray Cyrus, Darryl Worley, and Craig Morgan)	I'm American
2020	"Kern River"	Sing Me Back Home: The Music Of Merle Haggard
2020	"Georgia on My Mind"	Willie Nelson: American Outlaw
2020	"Spirit Rider"	Johnny Cash: Forever Words Expanded
2020	"California Poem'	Johnny Cash: Forever Words Expanded
2021	"Lonesome for a Livin'" (with Blackberry Smoke)	You Hear Georgia
2021	"To All The Girls I've Loved Before" (with Raul Malo)	Quarantunes Vol. 1
2021	"Highway Feet" (with Larry Fleet)	Stack of Records
2022	"Stubborn Pride'" (with Zac Brown Band)	The Comeback
2022	"If I Needed You" (with Rachel Bradshaw)	Rachel Bradshaw
2022	"Just Dropped In (To See What Condition My Condition Is In)"	Kenny Rogers: All In For The Gambler
2022	"Sweet Music Man"	Kenny Rogers: All In For The Gambler
2022	"Music City's Killing Me" (with Julie Roberts)	TBA
2022	"I'm Just an Old Chunk of Coal (But I'm Gonna Be a Diamond Someday)"	Something Borrowed, Something New: A Tribute to John Anderson

== Awards and nominations ==
Johnson received three Grammy Award nominations at the 51st Grammy Awards: Best Country Album for That Lonesome Song, and Best Country Song and Best Male Country Vocal Performance for "In Color". "In Color" won the Academy of Country Music's 2009 award for Song of the Year and the same award during the 2009 Country Music Association Awards. Going into 2010, Johnson received two more Grammy Award nominations for the 52nd Grammy Awards: Best Country Song and Best Male Country Vocal Performance, both for his 2009 single "High Cost of Living".

Year	Nominee / work	Award	Result
2007	Academy of Country Music	Song of the Year – Give It Away	Won
2007	Country Music Association	Song of the Year – "Give It Away"	Won
2009	51st Grammy Awards	Best Country Album – That Lonesome Song	Nominated
2009	51st Grammy Awards	Best Country Song – "In Color"	Nominated
2009	51st Grammy Awards	Best Male Country Vocal Performance – "In Color"	Nominated
2009	Academy of Country Music	Song of the Year – "In Color"	Won
2009	Academy of Country Music	Top New Male Artist	Nominated
2009	Academy of Country Music	Top Album of the Year – That Lonesome Song	Nominated
2009	Country Music Association	Song of the Year – "In Color"	Won
2009	Country Music Association	Single of the Year – "In Color"	Nominated
2009	Country Music Association	New Artist of the Year	Nominated
2009	Country Music Association	Album of the Year – That Lonesome Song	Nominated
2010	52nd Grammy Awards	Best Country Song – "High Cost of Living"	Nominated
2010	52nd Grammy Awards	Best Male Country Vocal Performance – "High Cost of Living"	Nominated
2010	Academy of Country Music	Top New Solo Vocalist	Nominated
2010	Country Music Association Awards	Musical Event – "Bad Angel" (with Dierks Bentley and Miranda Lambert)	Nominated
2011	53rd Grammy Awards	Best Male Country Vocal Performance – "Macon"	Nominated
2011	53rd Grammy Awards	Best Country Collaboration with Vocals – "Bad Angel" (with Dierks Bentley and Miranda Lambert)	Nominated
2011	53rd Grammy Awards	Best Country Album – The Guitar Song	Nominated
2013	55th Grammy Awards	Best Country Album – Living for a Song: A Tribute to Hank Cochran	Nominated
