= The Fixer (song) =

2009 single by Pearl Jam

Single by Pearl Jam

from the album Backspacer
- B-side: "Supersonic"
- Released: August 24, 2009
- Recorded: February 16–27, 2009
- Studio: Henson Recording Studios, Hollywood, California
- Genre: Alternative rock, pop rock
- Length: 2:58
- Label: Monkeywrench (US), Universal Music Group (international)
- Composers: Matt Cameron, Mike McCready, Stone Gossard
- Lyricist: Eddie Vedder
- Producer: Brendan O'Brien

Pearl Jam singles chronology
"Love, Reign o'er Me" (2007)	"The Fixer" (2009)	"Got Some" / "Just Breathe" (2009)

Audio sample
- file; help

Music video
- "The Fixer" on YouTube

"The Fixer" is a song by the rock band Pearl Jam. Featuring lyrics written by vocalist Eddie Vedder and music co-written by drummer Matt Cameron and guitarists Mike McCready and Stone Gossard, "The Fixer" was released on August 24, 2009, as the first single from the band's ninth studio album, Backspacer (2009). The song debuted and peaked at number two on the Billboard Rock Songs chart and reached number three on the Billboard Alternative Songs chart.

== Origin and recording ==
"The Fixer" features lyrics written by vocalist Eddie Vedder and music co-written by drummer Matt Cameron and guitarists Mike McCready and Stone Gossard. Cameron wrote the majority of the song's music in 2008, while Gossard and McCready would end up writing the song's bridge. In an interview with Rolling Stone in February 2009, Vedder discussed a song matching the description of "The Fixer". Vedder stated, "That could have been a seven-minute, weird, sideways kind of artsy song with a cool groove...I tinkered with it after everyone left, and we shrunk it down and turned it into something else....I'm thinking about set lists: 'Will this be a song we'll play every night?'."

Gossard on the song:

With that song, Matt came in with a riff and we worked out a few different arrangements. Then Ed took it and re-arranged it with Pro Tools, to get the parts he needed in the right place. You don't want to get a final arrangement for a song before he's had a chance to screw around with it, because once he gets it, it can all change. What you thought was a chorus can end up being a verse. There was a real collaborative effort on the whole album. Ed, in particular, worked with everyone on their songs.

== Composition ==
"The Fixer" is composed in the key of D major, and uses odd time signatures and switches between them regularly throughout the song. The song starts in 5/4, then switches to 6/4 for the verse, while the chorus and bridge are both in 4/4. Gossard stated, "It's relatively straightforward, but it has Matt's love of odd time. It also breaks back down to something very three-chord and fun. We need that. If Pearl Jam is thinking too much, we're not very good. We're much better when we're not thinking."

Gossard on the song:

I think the band definitely progressed and did some things we haven't done before. When people talk about "pop" I think it's about a simplicity of melody and a simplicity of arrangement that doesn't over complicate a good idea or a great lyric. I think "The Fixer" is a great example. You really hear something about Eddie's personality in the lyric and you get a view that a lot of people don't get from him which is a sort of optimistic and playful melody and lyric.

== Lyrics ==
Commenting on the suggestion that he is "The Fixer" referred to in the song's title, Vedder stated, "My answer is, aren't we all? Maybe I'm wrong to think that, but it seems like we are...I'm thinking more on a worldview or a community view."

Vedder on the song:

Men, we all think we can fix anything. It's not necessarily a good thing. In a relationship, a woman will say 'This is wrong,' and we're like, 'I'll fix that, don't worry about it, we can fix it.' These wonderful people, the woman you're in a relationship with, they don't want you to fix it. They just want you to listen to what's happening: 'Don't fix it, I want you to own this with me—feel it.' This is a reminder song to me, to stop fixing.

== Release ==
On July 14, 2009, a 30-second clip of "The Fixer" was featured on Fox's broadcast of the 2009 Major League Baseball All-Star Game. "The Fixer" was released to radio airplay on July 20, 2009. A 7" single for "The Fixer" was released commercially through the band's official website on August 24, 2009, accompanied by the B-side "Supersonic", also from the album. The song was also made available commercially as a single download minus the B-side "Supersonic" from iTunes on the same day. The same track listing that is featured on the 7" single is also featured on a UK CD single release and a digital download from the UK Amazon.com store, both of which were released commercially on September 7, 2009.

== Chart performance ==
The song debuted and peaked at number 56 on the Billboard Hot 100, number ten on the Billboard Mainstream Rock Tracks chart, and reached number three on the Billboard Alternative Songs chart. In Canada, the song reached the top 20 on the Canadian Hot 100. "The Fixer" reached the top 100 in the UK and peaked at number 27 on the Australian Singles Chart. It also reached the top 20 in New Zealand and the top 100 in Germany and Japan.

== Critical reception ==
Stephen M. Deusner of Pitchfork said in his review of the song that "neither the band nor Brendan O'Brien has a light touch for this sort of classic rock-oriented pop...Vedder, whose default is tortured defiance, can't help but add too much gravity to these lyrics, as if fixin' things was an obligation instead of a calling. They work too hard here trying to have fun." Jessica Letkemann of Billboard said in her review of the song that it is "shot through with optimism at a level not seen since Pearl Jam's 1998 Yield." She added that "with Vedder mixed down among Stone Gossard and Mike McCready's warm guitars and the throat-ripping moments of his delivery somewhat muted, there's a sense of reserve that makes 'The Fixer' a tease for hearing PJ in its uninhibited natural setting: live." Josh Modell of Spin said that "'The Fixer'...[exploits] Pearl Jam's leanest, punkest tendencies...when Eddie Vedder pulls out that indignant yet inclusive snarl and proclaims, 'When something's gone, I wanna fight to get it back again,' you can probably assume 'it' is his band's mojo." In his review of Backspacer, Rob Sheffield of Rolling Stone magazine said, "There's a definite positivity to the 'yeah, yeah, yeah' choruses that jump out of 'The Fixer', which evoke the old openhearted vulnerability of 'Wishlist'." In its review of Backspacer, The Guardian stated that "when Eddie Vedder yells of a 'fight to get it back again' on 'The Fixer', he is surely referring to the band rediscovering their mojo."

"The Fixer" was nominated for Best Rock Song at the 52nd Grammy Awards, losing to "Use Somebody" by Kings of Leon.

== Other uses ==
In September 2009, "The Fixer" was made available as downloadable content for the Rock Band series as a master track as part of the album Backspacer.

The song is included on the soundtrack of the anti-nuclear documentary Countdown to Zero, where it plays over the end credits.

The song is included in the baseball video game MLB 2K10, although it is exclusive to the Xbox 360 version.

== Music video ==
The music video for "The Fixer" was directed by Cameron Crowe. The video was filmed at The Showbox in Seattle, Washington in May 2009. The video consists of a filmed live performance of the band rather than a conceptual video. The video was released in August 2009. Footage from the video was used for a commercial for Target advertising Backspacer which features "The Fixer".

== Live performances ==
"The Fixer" was first performed live at the band's August 8, 2009 concert in Calgary, Alberta, Canada at the Virgin Festival. Despite being a popular single, it has only been played four times since the end of the Backspacer tour in 2012. When the song is played live, the band plays it in the key of D♭ major, which institutes the de-tuning of the guitars to a half-step down (E♭, A♭, D♭, G♭, B♭, E♭). Live performances of "The Fixer" can be found on various official bootlegs.

== Track listing ==
All lyrics written by Eddie Vedder.

CD (UK), 7" Vinyl Single, and Digital Download (UK)

1. "The Fixer" (music: Matt Cameron, Stone Gossard, Mike McCready) – 2:58
2. "Supersonic" (music: Gossard) – 2:40

== Charts ==
Chart (2009)	Peak Position
New Zealand Singles Chart	11
Australian Singles Chart	22
Canadian Hot 100	14
Billboard Canada Rock	1
Japan Hot 100	78
German Singles Chart	97
UK Singles Chart	93
U.S. Billboard Hot 100	56
U.S. Billboard Rock Songs	2
U.S. Billboard Alternative Songs	3
U.S. Billboard Mainstream Rock Tracks	10
U.S. Billboard Adult Alternative Songs	5
