= Just Breathe (Pearl Jam song) =

Single by Pearl Jam

from the album Backspacer
- B-side: "Got Some"
- Released: October 31, 2009
- Recorded: 2009
- Genre: Folk rock, Alternative Rock
- Length: 3:34
- Label: Monkeywrench
- Songwriter: Eddie Vedder
- Producer: Brendan O'Brien

Pearl Jam singles chronology
"The Fixer" (2009)	"Got Some" / "Just Breathe" (2009)	"Amongst the Waves" (2010)

Music video
- "Just Breathe" on YouTube

"Just Breathe" is a song by the American rock band Pearl Jam. It was released on October 31, 2009 as the second single from the band's ninth studio album Backspacer (2009). The song was triggered by a chord from "Tuolumne", an instrumental from Eddie Vedder's soundtrack for the 2007 film Into the Wild.

The song spent 13 weeks at number one on Billboard''s Adult Alternative Airplay chart; in 2021, it was named the 14th-most successful song in the chart's history. It also peaked at number six on the Alternative Airplay chart, becoming the band's highest-charting second single since "Wishlist" in 1998. In Europe, the song was a top-10 hit in Portugal and a top 20 hit in the Netherlands.

== Background ==
The first chord of the song comes from "Tuolumne", an instrumental from Eddie Vedder's soundtrack for the 2007 film Into the Wild. What became the chorus for "Just Breathe" was originally intended by Vedder as the song's bridge, but was changed because producer Brendan O'Brien preferred it that way.

On January 22, 2014, "Just Breathe" was certified platinum in digital sales by the RIAA. It is the band's first platinum-certified song.

== Track listing ==
All lyrics written by Eddie Vedder.

CD (UK), 7" vinyl single, and digital download (UK)

1. "Got Some" (music: Jeff Ament) – 3:01
2. "Just Breathe" (music: Vedder) – 3:34

Digital download (Australia)

1. "Got Some" – 3:03
2. "Just Breathe" – 3:36
3. "Just Breathe" (Live at Austin City Limits video) – 3:52

== Charts ==
=== Weekly charts ===
Chart (2009–2010)	Peak position
Canada Hot 100 (Billboard)	30
Canada Rock (Billboard)	1
Croatia (ARC Top 100)	80
Netherlands (Dutch Top 40)	14
Netherlands (Single Top 100)	18
Portugal (AFP)	9
US Billboard Hot 100	78
US Adult Pop Airplay (Billboard)	20
US Hot Rock & Alternative Songs (Billboard)	5

=== Year-end charts ===
Chart (2010)	Position
Canadian Hot 100	95
Netherlands (Dutch Top 40)	105

== Certifications ==
Region	Certification	Certified units/sales
Brazil (Pro-Música Brasil)	Platinum	60,000^{‡}
Italy (FIMI)	Gold	15,000^{‡}
New Zealand (RMNZ)	Platinum	30,000^{‡}
United States (RIAA)	Platinum	1,000,000^{‡}
^{‡} Sales+streaming figures based on certification alone.

== Covers ==
Willie Nelson released his version of the song on the 2012 album Heroes, as well as a promotional single.

Jennifer Warnes released her version of the song on the 2018 album Another Time, Another Place.

Miley Cyrus released a version of the song on YouTube in 2020, as part of the MTV Unplugged Presents Miley Cyrus Backyard Sessions.

Dave Matthews covered the song solo on September 2, 2023, as part of the encore of Dave Matthews Band's show at the Gorge Amphitheater, in tribute to Jimmy Buffett and other friends who “breathed their last this week”. He continued to play the song during the band's 2023 fall tour and into their 2024 summer tour.
