= Spirit (Willie Nelson album) =

Studio album by Willie Nelson
- Released: 1996
- Studio: Pedernales Recording (Spicewood, Texas)
- Genres: Country, classical
- Length: 39:55
- Label: Island
- Producer: Willie Nelson

Willie Nelson chronology
Augusta (1995)	Spirit (1996)	How Great Thou Art (1996)

Professional ratings
Review scores
Source	Rating
AllMusic	4.5/5 stars
Los Angeles Times	3/4 stars
Robert Christgau	A-

Spirit is the 44th studio album by country music singer Willie Nelson. The album differs from Nelson's other albums because of the use of fewer instruments (two guitars, piano, fiddle) and has a more classical/Spanish influence than others. Nelson's sister Bobbie plays piano.

== Track listing ==
All songs written by Willie Nelson.

1. "Matador" - 1:42
2. "She Is Gone" - 2:55
3. "Your Memory Won't Die in My Grave" - 3:27
4. "I'm Not Trying to Forget You" - 3:53
5. "Too Sick to Pray" - 2:40
6. "Mariachi" - 2:06
7. "I'm Waiting Forever" - 3:09
8. "We Don't Run" - 3:02
9. "I Guess I've Come to Live Here in Your Eyes" - 3:36
10. "It's a Dream Come True" - 3:59
11. "I Thought About You, Lord" - 4:11
12. "Spirit of E9" - 4:58
13. "Matador"

== Personnel ==
- Willie Nelson - Lead guitar, Vocals, Producer
- Bobbie Nelson - Piano
- Johnny Gimble - Fiddle
- Jody Payne - Rhythm guitar, Backing vocals

Technical

- Recorded and Mixed by Joe Gracey
- Second Engineer - Gabe Rhodes
- Recorded at Pedernales Recording in Austin, Texas
- Edited at Terra Nova Digital Austin
- Mastered by Denny Purcell and Joe Gracey at Georgetown
- Mastering in Nashville, Tennessee
- Photography - Chris Buck
- Artwork - David Zetter
- Design - Red Herring Design

== Chart performance ==
Chart (1996)	Peak position
Australian Albums (ARIA)	136
U.S. Billboard Top Country Albums	20
U.S. Billboard 200	132
Canadian RPM Country Albums	4
