= The Guitar Song =

Studio album by Jamey Johnson
- Released: September 14, 2010
- Studio: Big Studios, Nashville, TN Lionsound, Los Angeles, CA Shrimp Boat Sound, Key West, FL
- Genre: Country
- Length: 105:26
- Label: Mercury Nashville
- Producer: Arlis Albritton (track 20); Dave Cobb (tracks 3, 6, 8, 16, 18, 19, 23); The Kent Hardly Playboys (all tracks)

Jamey Johnson chronology
That Lonesome Song (2008)	The Guitar Song (2010)	Living for a Song: A Tribute to Hank Cochran (2012)

Singles from The Guitar Song
- 1. "My Way to You" Released: July 13, 2009; 2. "Playing the Part" Released: August 23, 2010; 3. "Heartache" Released: January 31, 2011

The Guitar Song is the third studio album by American country music artist Jamey Johnson. It was released in the United States on September 14, 2010, through Mercury Nashville.

== Background ==
The Guitar Song is the follow-up to Johnson's critically acclaimed 2008 album That Lonesome Song. In an exclusive interview with Billboard Magazine, Johnson talked about the new release, saying, "it's been really fun for me. The past several times we've been in the studio is just...it stays fresh, it stays new and we're always looking for innovative ways to bring our songs to the people."

Spin Magazine named The Guitar Song in its "25 Fall Albums That Matter Most" special, saying "Johnson likes country from the old school (or at least the mythologized "old school"), when outlaw songs met with moody ballads and swirled into something like rootsy American bedrock."

== Recording ==
The album is divided into two parts; a 12-track CD; titled "Black Album" and a 13-track CD titled "White Album". Johnson explained his reasoning behind the double-disc album, saying "The original idea was always to do a double album," says Johnson. "It is an album that is a tale. The first part is a very dark and sordid story. Then everything after that is progressively more positive, reassuring, and redemptive."

In a "Q&A" with Billboard Magazine, Johnson talked about the recording for the album, which took place shortly after the release of That Lonesome Song, "about a month-and-a-half after we did That Lonesome Song, we were back in Nashville and made another record, and then a few months later we recorded another session. Every time we recorded 10 or 12 songs. My thinking was to go completely outside the box and not just release one album, but put out five or six a year, just let 'em go. When I got busy and didn't have enough time to focus on those things any more, they just started piling up. Ol' TW and I would be sitting in the mixing room listening to these songs and trying to make our way through 'em. There were songs that seemed to work together really well, and songs that didn't seem to fit this particular album at all. But somewhere in between working on a mix one night, we just kind of sat back and dreamt up this idea about having an album that takes you on an emotional journey." He also talked about the creative freedom he had in the studio saying "That creative freedom is not something that was granted to me, it's something that has always been mine. I'm the one that chooses whether or not I give that up. Nobody comes and demands that I give it up. You can demand all you want to, you'll be met with the same result everybody else has been met with so far."

In an interview with The Wall Street Journal, Johnson reflected on the recording of the album, saying, "When we sat down to look at this album, it just kind of all came flooding in at once. But as we spent more time looking at it as a whole, we got to thinking. I could see that all these songs that we had could be placed around in the yin/yang scheme the Chinese use in their annual calendar, in terms of the time of year it was when I wrote the song, or the kind of message that the song delivers, and we developed our own little test from that as to where to put them."

== Critical reception ==
Professional ratings
Aggregate scores
Source	Rating
Metacritic	91/100
Review scores
Source	Rating
AllMusic	5/5 stars
The A.V. Club	A−
Entertainment Weekly	B+
Los Angeles Times	4/4 stars
PopMatters	9/10
Rolling Stone	4.5/5 stars
Spin	9/10
Tom Hull	B+

Upon its release, The Guitar Song was met with overwhelming praise by music critics. At Metacritic, which assigns a normalized rating out of 100 to reviews from mainstream critics, the album received an average score of 91, based on 9 reviews, which indicates "universal acclaim".

Thom Jurek with AllMusic called the album "the country album of 2010", saying that "The Guitar Song is uncompromising [...] it makes plain the music contemporary country is trying to erase, while being a thoroughly accessible modern offering." Ann Powers with The Los Angeles Times referred to the album as being "exquisite", calling it "an ambitious work that goes down easy. Johnson may masquerade as a throwback but what he really aims for is timelessness, and he usually hits his mark." Will Hermes with Rolling Stone gave it a near-perfect rating, saying "Johnson's 2008 breakthrough, That Lonesome Song, established him as an heir to "outlaws" like Waylon Jennings and Merle Haggard. The Guitar Song aims even higher, with 25 tracks that take the pulse of a country hitting the skids and a country singer hitting the big time." Dan MacIntosh with Roughstock gave it a perfect rating, commenting "At two full CDs long, The Guitar Song is not a full plate of music; it's an overflowing one. The good news is it's mainly comprised of killer, not filler." Mikael Wood with Spin Magazine gave it nine out of ten stars, saying "The Guitar Song is structured as an uplifting journey from rot to redemption, Johnson still moves through these 25 tunes with an audible snarl.

Stuart Munro with The Boston Globe called the release "a phenomenal collection of country music", and asked "What can Jamey Johnson do to top this?" Chris Neal with The 9513 also gave the album a perfect rating, saying "The album’s sheer size is daunting—25 songs spread across an hour and 45 minutes of music—but there are no weak spots, not one track that cries out to be jettisoned." Chuck Eddy with The Village Voice commented saying "The Guitar Song's [...] got a few clunkers and slow spots, and, especially given the depressive tempos Johnson's so fond of, it's inadvisable to ingest in one sitting. But surprisingly—even without a single track half as monumental or emotionally inescapable as Lonesome's "High Cost of Living,"—Guitar is packed at least as solid as his last set, and it's less conventional to boot."

=== Accolades ===
The album appeared on many music critics' and publications' end-of-year albums lists. PopMatters placed it at number one on their "PopMatters Picks: The Best Country Music of 2010" list, with writer Dave Heaton calling it "an ambitious double LP of dour, old-school country music; it’s an epic of personal struggle in a climate of societal turmoil". Rolling Stone magazine placed it at number five calling it an "acoustic confessions and rugged boogie blues, big weepers and grim reapers, cover tunes and novelty ditties". Spin placed it at number five on their "The 40 Best Albums of 2010" list, saying "Johnson's double-album opus isn't one of the past decade's best country records because he's a boundary-pushing subversive. It's because his haunting baritone artfully inhabits every cranny of Nashville's sylvan McMansion of the Mind". Allison Stewart with The Washington Post placed it at number four on her "top 10 albums of 2010" calling it "Two discs of solid, stolid country the way Haggard did it".

Sarah Rodman with The Boston Globe placed it at number one on her "top 10 CDs of 2010" list saying "Here is that rare gem: a double album where every cut is vital, from the blackly morose ballads to the firewater-breathing honky-tonk blasts. A towering achievement from a country singer-songwriter whose talent for penning vivid narratives and choosing the right ones to cover appears to be growing exponentially". Chris Richards with The Washington Post placed it at number two on his "top 10 albums of 2010" saying "He sings in the baritone of God and carries a guitar covered in Sharpie squiggles — autographs from the likes of Haggard, Nelson and other country music royalty. Now Johnson’s sweeping double album raises the question: How long before he has to sign it himself"?

== Commercial performance ==
The album debuted at number four on the U.S. Billboard 200 and number one on the U.S. Billboard Top Country Albums, selling 63,000 copies its first week of release. As of the chart dated February 19, 2011, the album has sold 263,013 copies in the US.

== Track listing ==
CD 1 "Black Album"
No.	Title	Writer(s)	Length
1.	"Lonely at the Top"	Don Cook, Chick Rains, Keith Whitley	3:13
2.	"Cover Your Eyes"	Bobby Bare, Wayd Battle, Jamey Johnson	3:44
3.	"Poor Man Blues"	Johnson	3:31
4.	"Set 'Em Up Joe"	Buddy Cannon, Hank Cochran, Dean Dillon, Vern Gosdin	2:47
5.	"Playing the Part"	Johnson, Shane Minor	4:29
6.	"Baby Don't Cry"	Johnson, George Teren	3:27
7.	"Heaven Bound"	Johnson	2:39
8.	"Can't Cash My Checks"	Jason Cope, Johnson, Shannon Lawson, James Otto	7:17
9.	"That's How I Don't Love You"	Johnson, Dean Miller	3:55
10.	"Heartache"	Johnson, Rivers Rutherford	5:20
11.	"Mental Revenge"	Mel Tillis	4:21
12.	"Even the Skies Are Blue"	Johnson, Rutherford	3:55

CD 2 "White Album"
No.	Title	Writer(s)	Length
13.	"By the Seat of Your Pants"	Battle, Carson Chamberlain, Teddy Gentry	6:28
14.	"California Riots"	Johnson, Lee Thomas Miller	6:21
15.	"Dog in the Yard"	Buddy Cannon, Johnson	3:25
16.	"The Guitar Song"	Bill Anderson, Johnson, Vicky McGehee	3:24
17.	"That's Why I Write Songs"	Chris DuBois, Ashley Gorley, Johnson	4:05
18.	"Macon"	Kacey Coppola, Johnson	4:18
19.	"Thankful for the Rain"	Johnson, McGehee, David Lee Murphy	2:59
20.	"Good Morning Sunrise"	Arlis Albritton	3:56
21.	"Front Porch Swing Afternoon"	Cannon, Johnson, Larry Shell	4:39
22.	"I Remember You"	Johnson, Minor	4:50
23.	"Good Times Ain't What They Used to Be"	Dallas Davidson, Johnson, Jim McCormick	3:04
24.	"For the Good Times"	Kris Kristofferson	4:01
25.	"My Way to You"	Johnson, Charlie Midnight	5:18

== Personnel ==
=== Technical ===
- Dave Cobb – producer
- Arlis Albritton – producer
- Ross Alexander – associate engineer
- Beau Boggs – assistant engineer
- T.W. Cargile – engineer, mixing, overdub engineer
- Melinda J.P. Harlan – photography
- Rick Humes – associate engineer
- J.L. Jamison – associate engineer
- Zach Kasik – assistant engineer
- The Kent Hardly Playboys – producer
- Randy LeRoy – mastering
- James Minchin III – photography
- Karen Naff – art direction, design
- Mark Rains – engineer
- Bob Scott – associate engineer
- Phillip Stein – production assistant
- Eric Torres – engineer
- Brian Wright – a&r

=== Musicians ===
- Brian Allen – bass guitar
- Bill Anderson – duet vocals on "The Guitar Song"
- Wayd Battle – acoustic guitar, electric guitar, background vocals
- Jim "Moose" Brown – acoustic guitar, piano, synthesizer, Hammond organ, wurlitzer, soloist
- Melonie Cannon – background vocals
- Dave Cobb – electric guitar
- Jason "Rowdy" Cope – acoustic guitar, electric guitar, soloist
- Kacey Coppola – background vocals
- Kate Coppola – background vocals
- Mark Crum – bass guitar
- Eric Darken – percussion
- Keith Gattis – electric guitar
- Kevin "Swine" Grantt – bass guitar, tic tac bass, upright bass
- Randy Houser – background vocals
- Jamey Johnson – acoustic guitar, electric guitar, lead vocals, background vocals
- Mike Kennedy – drums
- "Cowboy" Eddie Long – dobro, steel guitar
- Fred Mandel – piano
- Dave McAfee – drums
- Mac McAnally – acoustic guitar
- Chris Powell – drums
- Rivers Rutherford – acoustic guitar
- John Scott – synthesizer
- Michael Spriggs – acoustic guitar
- John Henry Trinko – piano
- Curtis Wright – background vocals

== Charts ==
=== Weekly charts ===
Chart (2010)	Peak position
US Billboard 200	4
US Top Country Albums (Billboard)	1

=== Year-end charts ===
Chart (2010)	Position
US Billboard 200	180
US Top Country Albums (Billboard)	36
Chart (2011)	Position
US Top Country Albums (Billboard)	48

=== Singles ===
Year	Single	Peak chart positions
Year	Single	US Country
2009	"My Way to You"	52
2010	"Playing the Part"	39
2011	"Heartache"	51

== Certifications ==
Country	Certification
United States	Gold
