= Water on the Road =

2011 video by Eddie Vedder

Video by Eddie Vedder
- Released: May 31, 2011
- Recorded: August 16 and 17, 2008, Warner Theatre, Washington, D.C.
- Genre: Folk rock
- Language: English

Water on the Road is a film released on DVD and Blu-ray by American singer and Pearl Jam frontman Eddie Vedder. It documents Vedder's 2008 solo tour, during which he performed Pearl Jam songs, numerous covers, and solo works including songs from the Into the Wild soundtrack. The film features mostly performances from two shows Vedder performed on August 16 and 17, 2008, at Warner Theatre in Washington, D.C. It was released on May 31, 2011.

== Track listing ==
1. "The Canyon"
2. "Sometimes"
3. "Trouble"
4. "Around the Bend"
5. "Girl from the North Country"
6. "Guaranteed"
7. "Setting Forth"
8. "Far Behind"
9. "No Ceiling"
10. "Rise"
11. "Golden State"
12. "Society"
13. "Forever Young"
14. "Ed Piano" (Instrumental)
15. "I'm Open"
16. "Man of the Hour"
17. "Driftin'"
18. "No More"
19. "You're True"
20. "Ukulele Interlude" (Instrumental)
21. "Unthought Known"
22. "Arc"
23. "Hard Sun"
24. "The Canyon (reprise)"
