= Jill Vedder =

American philanthropist, activist and former fashion model

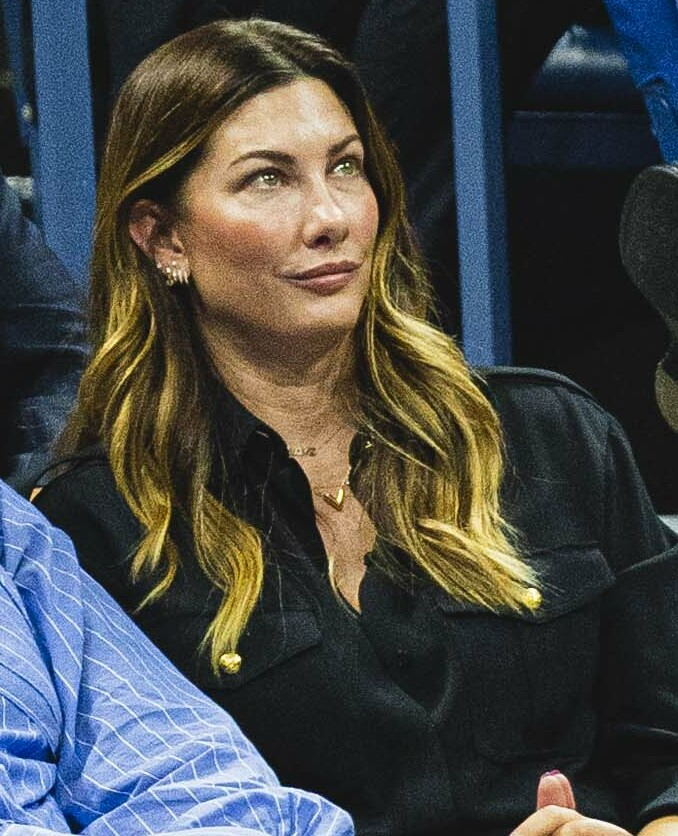
- Vedder in 2022
- Born: Jill Kristin McCormick; November 11, 1977 (age 48); Inglewood, California, U.S.
- Occupations: Philanthropist; Activist; Fashion model
- Spouse: Eddie Vedder (m. 2010)
- Children: 2
- Modeling information
- Height: 5 ft 10 in (178 cm)
- Hair color: Light brown
- Eye color: Green
- Agency: Elite Model Management; Champagne Trott Management

Jill Kristin Vedder (née McCormick; born November 11, 1977) is an American philanthropist, activist, and former fashion model. She is the co-founder and vice chairman of EB Research Partnership, a non-profit organization dedicated to finding a cure for the genetic skin disorder epidermolysis bullosa. She is also an ambassador for Global Citizen and the Vitalogy Foundation.

== Early life ==
McCormick was born in Inglewood, California, to Bud and Amy McCormick. She has five sisters.

== Career ==
=== Model ===
At 15, McCormick relocated with her family to Bradenton, Florida, and was immediately accepted into the Elite Models' Miami Division. She attended Mira Costa High School in Manhattan Beach, California, and graduated from Manatee High School in Bradenton in 1995.

In 1996, McCormick was one of the 15 finalists in the Elite Model Look of the Year contest, and moved to Paris to continue her modeling career. McCormick then left Elite Model for the Champagne Trott Management agency. She has appeared in many magazines, such as Vogue, Elle, Marie Claire, Cosmopolitan (UK and US) and Harper's Bazaar.

=== Philanthropy ===
After retiring from modeling, McCormick turned to activism. She is the co-founder, with her husband Eddie Vedder, and chairwoman of the EB Research Partnership, a non-profit organization dedicated to finding a cure for the genetic skin disorder Epidermolysis bullosa. McCormick had a childhood friend whose son was born with EB. The foundation hosts several annual fundraising events and have raised over U$75million to fund research to find a cure for EB.

McCormick is an ambassador for Global Citizen, an organization committed to ending extreme poverty by 2030. She is also active with the Vitalogy Foundation, which supports the efforts of non-profit organizations doing work in the fields of community health, the environment, arts & education and social change. She also supports "Moms Demand Action" on their fight against gun violence and the NRA.

Since 2012, McCormick supports "Every Mother Counts", a non-profit that is working to make pregnancy and childbirth safe for every mother in the U.S. and around the world. In 2017 and 2018, McCormick competed in a half-marathon on behalf of Team Every Mother Counts to raise awareness and funds. She is also a supporter of Planned Parenthood.

In 2013, along with her sisters Denise and Ashley, Jill formed "Babes Against Brain Cancer", a charity that focuses on helping people with Glioblastoma Multiforme.

On November 18, 2020, EB Research Partnership co-founders Jill and Eddie Vedder presented the inaugural Venture Into Cures, a virtual event featuring stories about individuals and families living with Epidermolysis Bullosa (EB) and raised funds for research toward a cure for EB and other rare diseases. Jill was also an executive producer of the show, that also featured some of the couple's celebrity friends educating viewers about EB.

== Personal life ==
McCormick and Pearl Jam lead singer Eddie Vedder began a relationship in 2000. The couple became engaged in 2009 and married on September 18, 2010. They have two daughters. In 2011, McCormick appeared in the music video for Vedder's solo single, "Longing to Belong". McCormick has adopted her husband's surname as her professional name.

During a Pearl Jam concert in Milan on June 22, 2018, McCormick wore a jacket that read: "Yes, we all care. Y don't u?", in response to U.S. First Lady Melania Trump, who caused controversy earlier that week when she boarded her plane after visiting children who had been separated from their parents at the border of the United States and Mexico, wearing a jacket that read: "I really don't care. Do u?".

== Music videos ==
Year	Title	Artist
2011	”Longing to Belong”	Eddie Vedder
