= Sleepless Nights (Everly Brothers song) =

1960 song by the Everly Brothers

Song by The Everly Brothers

from the album It's Everly Time
- Released: May 1960
- Recorded: March 8, 1960
- Studio: RCA Victor Studio B
- Genre: Rock and roll
- Length: 2:24
- Label: Warner Bros.
- Songwriter: Felice and Boudleaux Bryant

"Sleepless Nights" is a song written by Felice and Boudleaux Bryant first sung by The Everly Brothers, in 1960, whose arrangement is the basis for every cover.

== Covers ==
- Berna-Dean Imperial USA 1963
- Jerry Byrd Monument USA 1963
- Emmylou Harris Reprise (LP: Pieces of the Sky) USA 1975
- The Judds Curb / RCA USA 1989
- Patty Loveless Saguaro Road USA 2008
- Peter & Gordon Capitol (LP: I Go to Pieces) 1965
- Eddie Vedder (featuring Glen Hansard) from his album Ukulele Songs Monkeywrench USA 2011
- Emmylou Harris Reprise USA 1975
- Gram Parsons A&M Records 1976
- The Mekons from their album Honky Tonkin' Sin Record Company, Twin/Tone Records 1987
- Elvis Costello Almo Sounds 1999

== Other songs by the same title ==
- Billy Fury Decca UK 1961
- The Ravens [Connecticut] Haven [CT] USA 1965
- Berna-Dean Imperial USA 1963
- Wayne Cochran And The C. C. Riders Epic USA 1972
- Sonny and Sean Pye UK 1966
- Buddy Thompson Foothill USA
