= All the Way (Eddie Vedder song) =

Single by Eddie Vedder
- Released: September 18, 2008
- Recorded: August 21–22, 2008, Auditorium Theatre, Chicago, Illinois
- Genre: Folk
- Length: 3:39
- Label: Ten Club
- Songwriter: Eddie Vedder

Eddie Vedder singles chronology
"No More" (2007)	"All the Way" (2008)	"My City of Ruins" (2010)

"All the Way" (also known as "(Someday We'll Go) All the Way" and referred to as "Go All the Way") is a song written and performed by Evanston, Illinois native and Pearl Jam vocalist Eddie Vedder about the Chicago Cubs. It was first performed in public on August 2, 2007, recorded on August 21, 2008 and August 22, 2008, and released as a single on September 18, 2008.

At the time of the song's release in 2008, it had been 100 years since the Cubs had last won the World Series. Vedder has been a lifelong Cubs fan. The song, which fondly looks forward to the Cubs' next World Series victory, was written with the encouragement of certain Chicago Cubs, most notably Ernie Banks. The song was first performed in Chicago and was recorded over two nights in 2008 at the end Vedder's first solo tour. The song was accompanied by an official video release by the team following their victory in the 2016 World Series.

== Origin and recording ==
Eddie Vedder's August 3, 2007 Wrigley Field visit

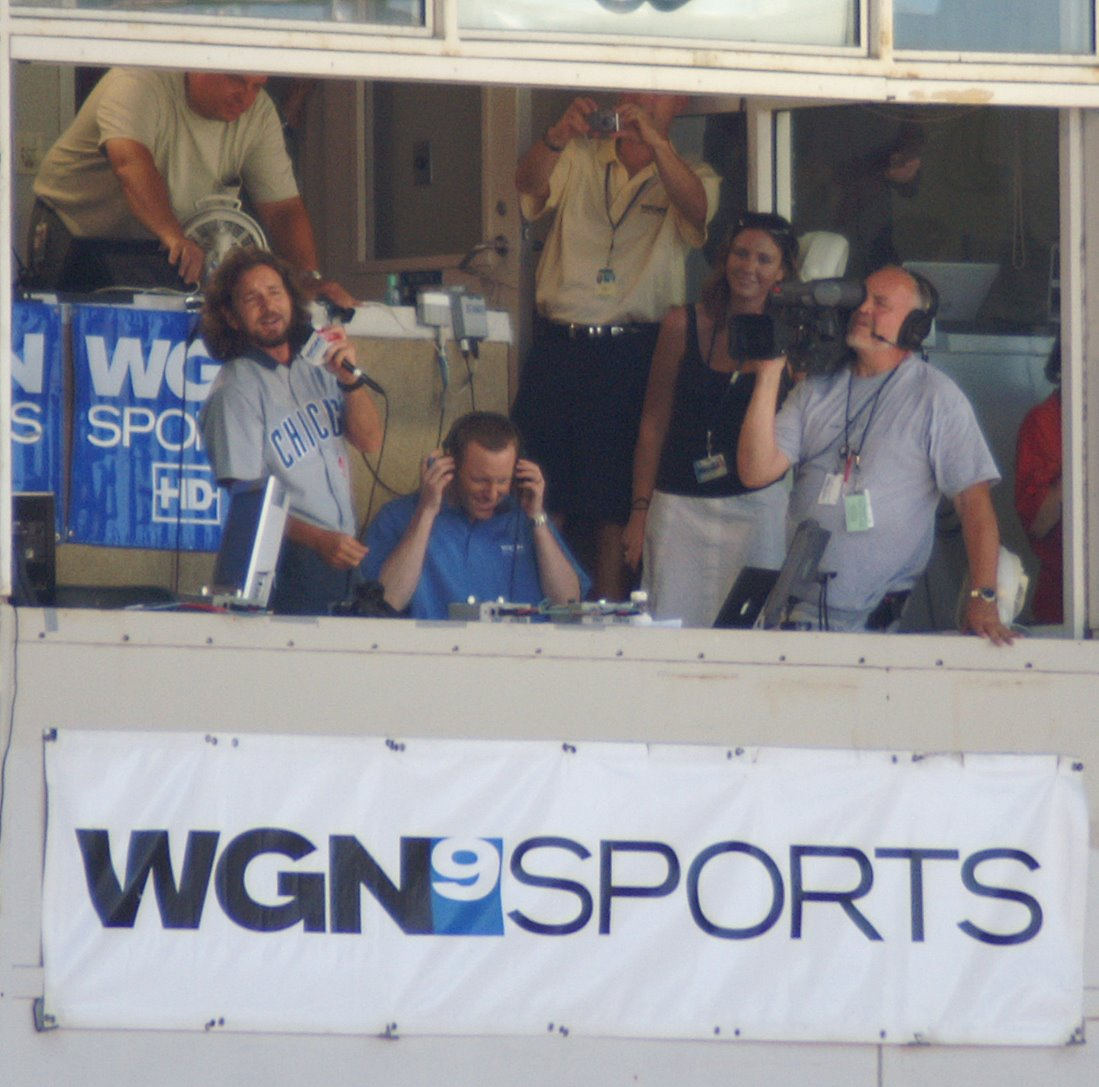
Singing "Take Me Out to the Ball Game" during seventh-inning stretch

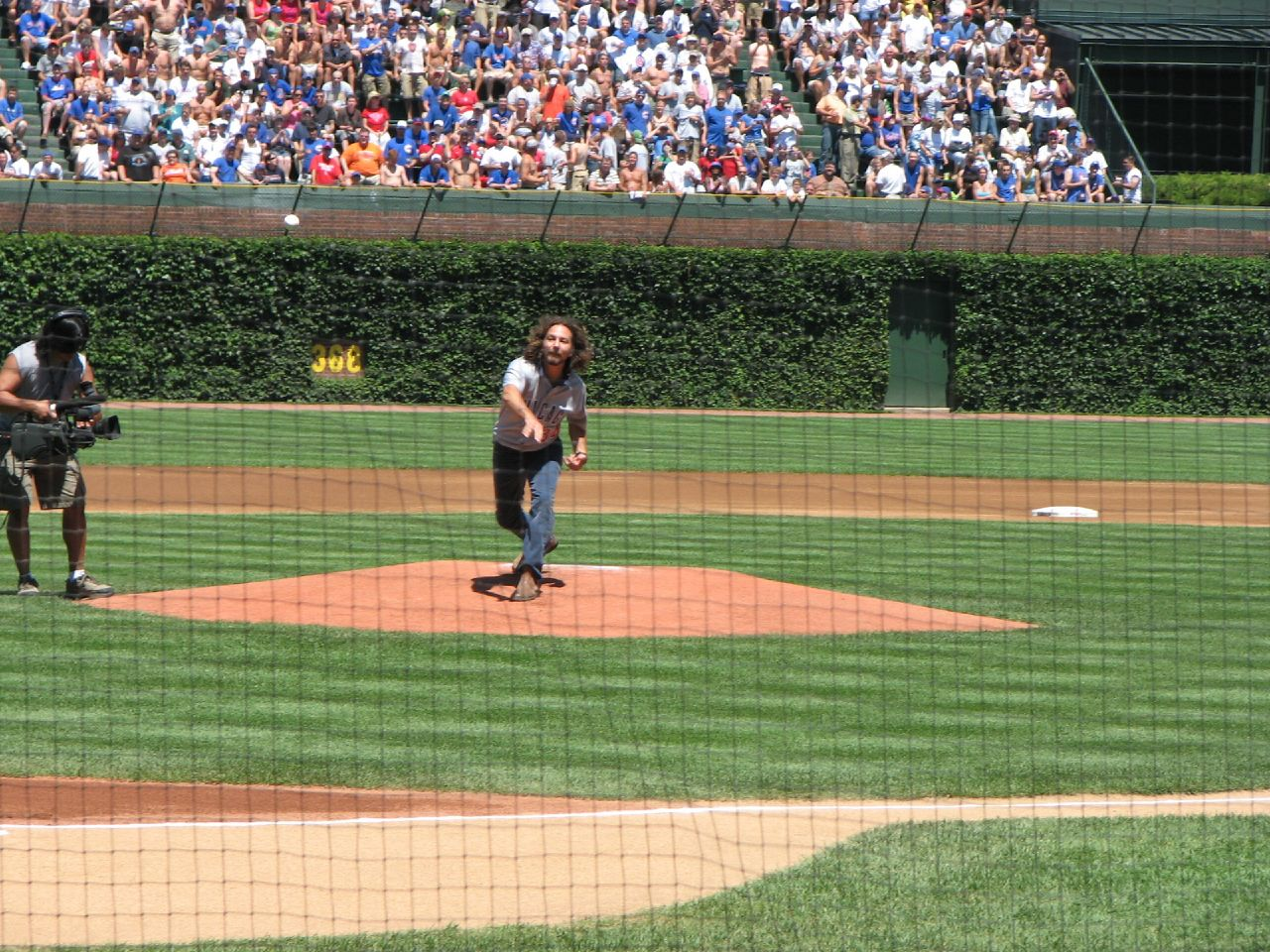
Throwing ceremonial first pitch

Pearl Jam vocalist Eddie Vedder was raised in Evanston, Illinois and later San Diego County, California; and even though he is closely associated with Seattle grunge music, Vedder has been a lifelong Chicago Cubs fan. He has performed the song "Take Me Out to the Ball Game" during the seventh-inning stretch at several Cubs games and thrown out the ceremonial first pitch at Wrigley Field. His first seventh-inning stretch performance was on Independence Day (July 4) 1998.

Vedder has attended the Cubs fantasy camp for several years. While attending the camp one year, former Cubs shortstop and first baseman Ernie Banks requested that Vedder write a song about the Cubs. Vedder wrote "All the Way" the night before the camp started and first performed it at Pearl Jam's concert of August 2, 2007 at The Vic Theatre in Chicago with Cubs pitcher Kerry Wood and other Cubs players in attendance. On August 3, 2007, one day after "All the Way" was premiered live, Vedder performed "Take Me Out to the Ball Game" during the seventh-inning stretch at Wrigley Field for the fourth time and threw out the first pitch for the first time. Vedder's band, Pearl Jam, was in Chicago that week to perform at Lollapalooza, where the band was the headlining act for the three-day festival that ended on August 5, 2007.

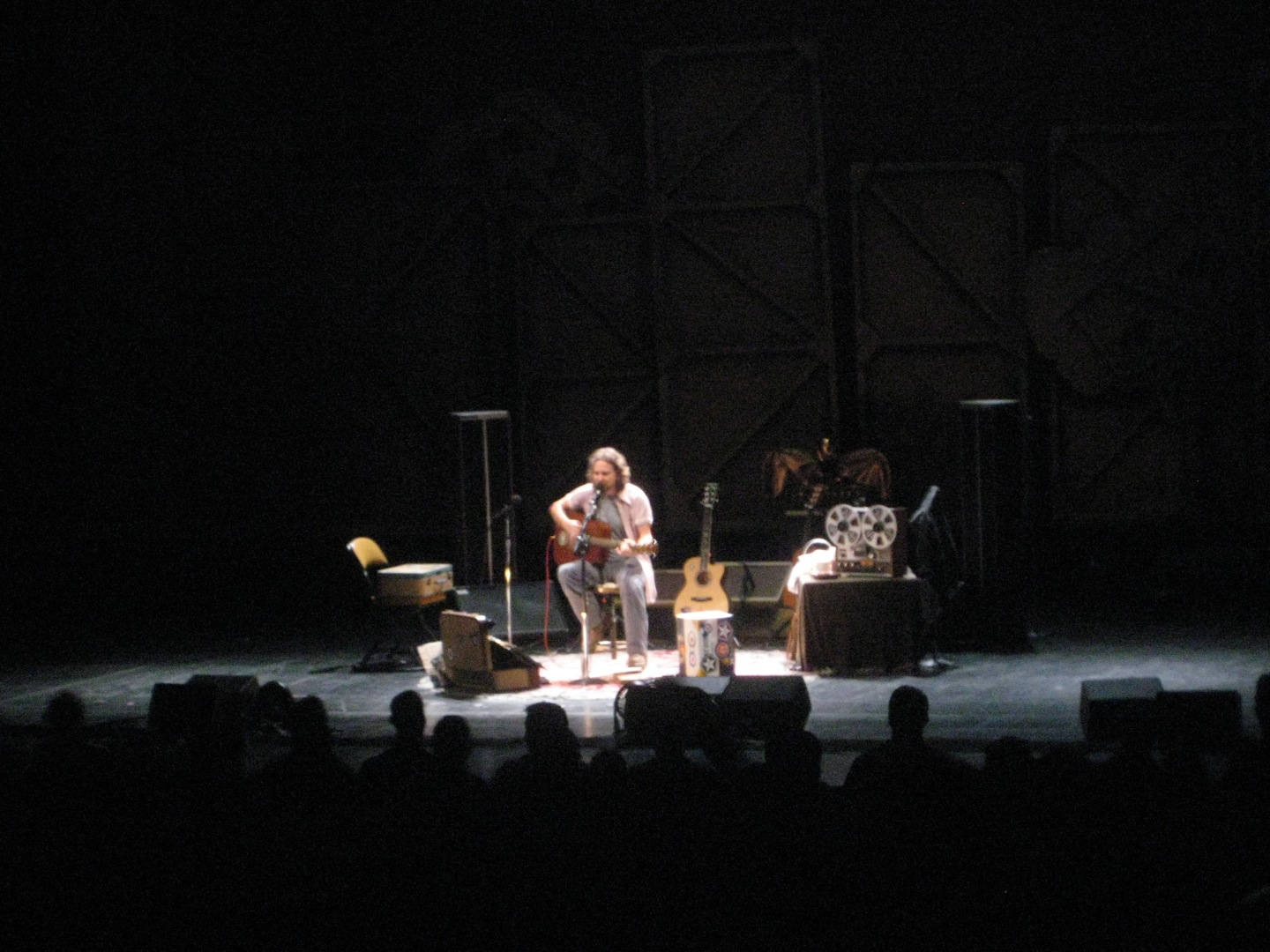
Eddie Vedder in concert at the Auditorium Theatre. (2008-08-21)

The version of "All the Way" heard on the commercial single release is mixed from recordings of the August 21, 2008 and August 22, 2008 solo performances of the song by Vedder at the Auditorium Theatre in Chicago. Vedder performed at the Auditorium Theatre on August 21 and 22, 2008 on a three-week extension of his solo tour that began in Boston, Massachusetts at the Boston Opera House (1980) and ended in Chicago. The solo tour had originally begun in Vancouver, British Columbia, Canada at The Centre on April 2, 2008. This tour was Vedder's first solo tour.

== Lyrics ==
The 3:39 song is in the folk music genre, and it is perceived as a sing-along sea chantey or drinking song. The lyrics to the song include lines such as "Our heroes wear pinstripes/Pinstripes in blue/Give us a chance to feel like heroes, too." The song makes references to Ernie Banks, Wrigley Field, and a specific reference to Banks' catch phrase of "Let's play two!" The refrain includes the phrase "Someday we'll go all the way, Yeah, someday we'll go all the way," which anticipates the day the Cubs win the World Series, gives the song its name.

== Release and reception ==
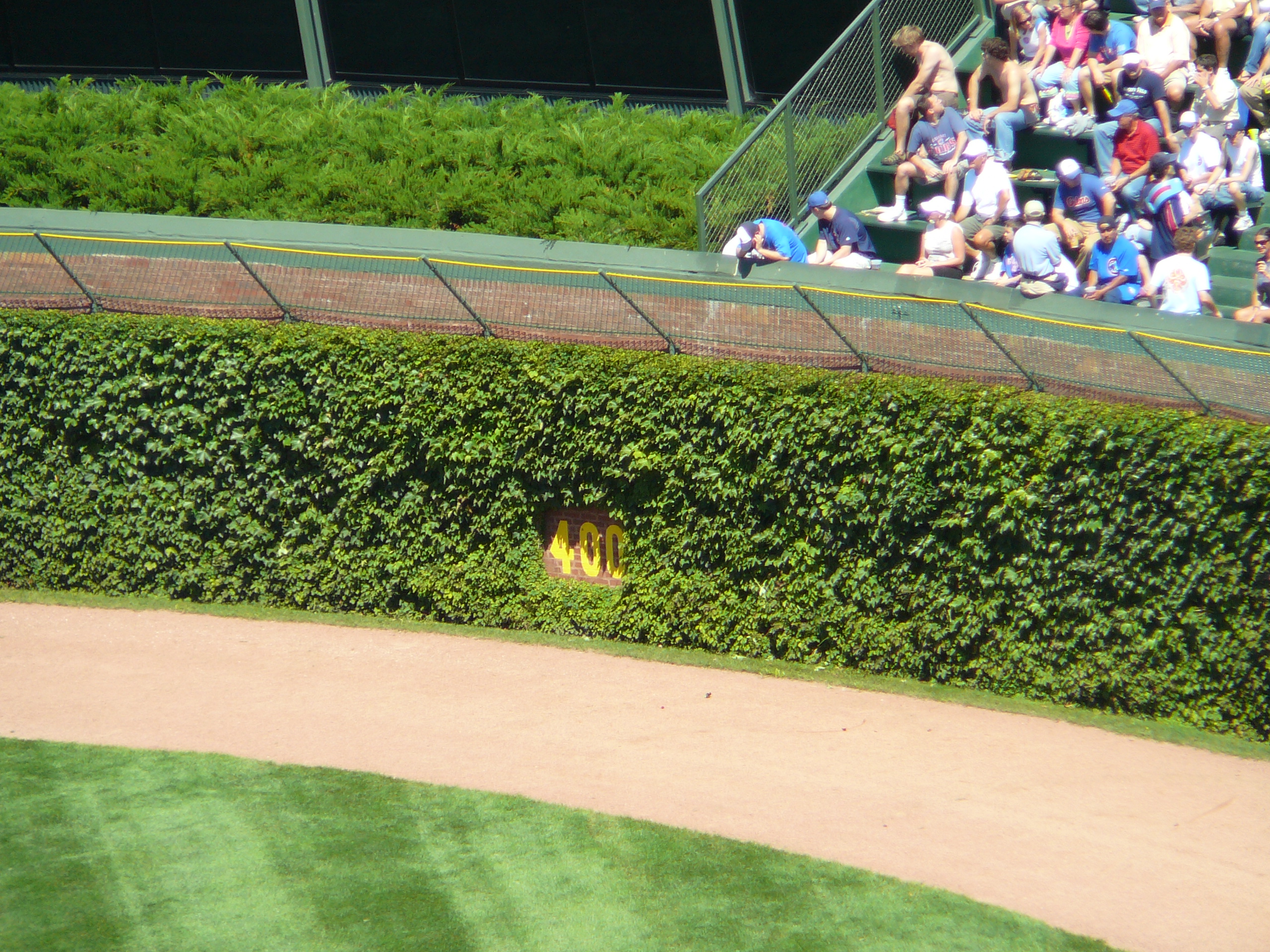
The digital download has been released with a modified image of the Wrigley Field ivy-covered outfield wall. (2008-09-02)

On September 18, 2008, "All the Way" was made available for digital download via Pearl Jam's official website for US$0.99. On approximately September 30, 2008, a CD single version was made available for purchase at select stores in the Chicago area. A souvenir 45 single format version is also a possibility. The digital download and CD single have been released with an associated single cover art image that is a modified version of the Wrigley Field outfield wall.

Philip K. Wrigley had employee Bill Veeck Jr. add ivy to the outfield walls of Wrigley Field in September 1937. Wrigley Field is the home stadium for the Chicago Cubs, and its wall is well known for being covered in ivy except for a few select places where signs are present as well as doors to locker rooms and such. The brick is visible under the ivy at the stadium in locations where the signs designate the distance from the wall to home plate measured in feet. The cover art image replaces the distance with the words "All the Way".

By the time of the single release, local Chicago radio stations and sports bars had begun to play the song in anticipation of the 2008 Cubs' playoff run. The song is considered to be an earnest tribute to the Cubs. According to at least one source, the song is reminiscent of "A Hard Rain's a-Gonna Fall" by American singer-songwriter Bob Dylan and much less upbeat than the song "Go, Cubs, Go" by American folk music singer-songwriter Steve Goodman. The Huffington Post encourages listeners to compare the song to Goodman's "Go, Cubs, Go". Another source compares the song to American country-folk singer-songwriter John Prine's 1974 song "Dear Abby" in terms of melody and cadence as well as the theme of Goodman's "A Dying Cubs Fan's Last Request".

At The Smashing Pumpkins' concert of November 20, 2008 at the Chicago Theatre, frontman Billy Corgan criticized Vedder and the song. Corgan stated, "If the Cubs did have a chance this last year that just passed, fuckin' Eddie Vedder killed that shit dead. Last I checked Eddie ain't living here, okay? Eddie ain't living here to write a song about my fuckin' team." When the Cubs won the 2016 World Series they released a video set to "All the Way".
