= Hard Sun (song) =

1989 song by Gordon Peterson

Single by Indio

from the album Big Harvest
- Released: 1989
- Genre: Folk rock
- Songwriter: Gordon Peterson

"Hard Sun" is a 1989 song written and performed by Canadian singer-songwriter Gordon Peterson, known as Indio. It was the first single released off the artist's sole album Big Harvest, and reached No. 10 in Canada. The song was covered by Eddie Vedder, whose rendition was included on the Into the Wild soundtrack. Indio filed a lawsuit against Vedder and Universal Music for altering the song's lyrics and including the song on the soundtrack without his approval, although both lawsuits were later dropped.

In 1990, "Hard Sun" was honored by SOCAN as one of the ten most popular Canadian songs of the previous year, alongside songs by Ian Thomas, Alannah Myles, One to One, Frozen Ghost, Blue Rodeo, Bruce Cockburn, Candi, Glass Tiger and Sheriff.

== Eddie Vedder cover ==
"Hard Sun"

Single by Eddie Vedder

from the album Into the Wild
- Released: September 18, 2007
- Recorded: 2007
- Studio: Studio X, Seattle, Washington
- Genre: Folk rock
- Length: 5:22; 4:31 (radio edit)
- Label: J
- Songwriter: Gordon Peterson
- Producers: Adam Kasper; Eddie Vedder

"Hard Sun" gained further attention when Eddie Vedder, the frontman of American rock band Pearl Jam, covered the song for the Into the Wild Soundtrack. Corin Tucker provided backing vocals.

In 2007, Sean Penn approached Eddie Vedder about creating a soundtrack for his upcoming film Into the Wild. According to Vedder, Penn showed Vedder an earlier draft of the film that included Indio's recording of "Hard Sun". Vedder was unfamiliar with the song, later telling Metro "it was the first time I'd ever heard it. But it felt like I had heard it. I couldn't tell if it was from the late '60s or mid-’70s. It had this kind of timeless thing about it."

After Vedder submitted some demos for inclusion on Into the Wild, Penn told him that he wanted Vedder's cover of "Hard to Sun" to appear on the soundtrack. Vedder mentioned that he had neither met nor consulted with Indio about the cover, but nonetheless expressed hope that Indio would appreciate Vedder's rendition.

"Hard Sun" became the soundtrack's first single, ultimately reaching No. 13 on the Modern Rock charts and No. 23 in Canada. Vedder's version of "Hard Sun" was released as a CD single with the radio edit of the song as the first track, and the full album version as the second track.

== Lawsuit ==
Eddie Vedder was sued by Indio for "eroding" the integrity of the composition by altering some of the song's original lyrics. Also the Universal Music company was sued, because it released "Hard Sun" on the soundtrack album without Indio's approval.

The suit against Vedder was dismissed, while a simultaneous suit against Universal was dropped after Universal and Peterson reached an undisclosed settlement.

== Charts ==
Chart performance for "Hard Sun" (Indio)
Chart (1989)	Peak position
Canada Top Singles (RPM)	10
US Album Rock Tracks (Billboard)	34
US Modern Rock Tracks (Billboard)	10

Chart performance for "Hard Sun" (Eddie Vedder)
Chart (2007)	Peak position
Canada Hot 100 (Billboard)	23
Canada Rock (Billboard)	2
US Adult Alternative Airplay (Billboard)	4
US Alternative Airplay (Billboard)	13

== Certifications ==
=== Eddie Vedder version ===
Region	Certification	Certified units/sales
New Zealand (RMNZ)	Platinum	30,000^{‡}
^{‡} Sales+streaming figures based on certification alone.
