= Earthling (Eddie Vedder album) =

Studio album by Eddie Vedder
- Released: February 11, 2022
- Recorded: 2021
- Genre: Rock
- Length: 47:57
- Label: Republic; Seattle Surf
- Producer: Andrew Watt

Eddie Vedder chronology
Ukulele Songs (2011)	Earthling (2022)

Singles from Earthling
- 1. "Long Way" Released: September 8, 2021; 2. "The Haves" Released: November 18, 2021; 3. "Brother the Cloud" Released: January 14, 2022; 4. "Invincible" Released: May 9, 2022

Earthling is the third solo studio album by American singer-songwriter Eddie Vedder. The album was released on February 11, 2022, by Republic Records and Seattle Surf.

== Critical reception ==
Professional ratings
Aggregate scores
Source	Rating
Metacritic	79/100
Review scores
Source	Rating
AllMusic	4.5/5 stars
American Songwriter	4/5 stars
Clash	6/10
Classic Rock	3.5/5 stars
NME	3/5 stars
Pitchfork	6.7/10
PopMatters	6/10
Rolling Stone	4/5 stars

Earthling received generally positive reviews from critics. At Metacritic, which assigns a normalised rating out of 100 to reviews from critics, the album received an average score of 79, which indicates "generally favorable reviews", based on 15 reviews. In March 2022 the album received a glowing review from Record Collector magazine: "Earthling gives an uplifting sense of the creative energy shared between Eddie Vedder and his keenly empathetic collaborators, distilled into striking, memorable songs, and unified by a fresh, cohesive sound."

== Track listing ==
All lyrics are written by Eddie Vedder.

Earthling track listing
No.	Title	Music	Length
1.	"Invincible"	Vedder; Andrew Wotman; Josh Klinghoffer	4:46
2.	"Power of Right"	Vedder; Wotman; Klinghoffer	3:33
3.	"Long Way"	Vedder; Wotman; Klinghoffer; Chad Smith	4:45
4.	"Brother the Cloud"	Vedder; Wotman; Klinghoffer; Smith	4:22
5.	"Fallout Today"	Vedder; Wotman; Klinghoffer; Smith	3:20
6.	"The Dark"	Vedder; Wotman; Klinghoffer; Smith	3:56
7.	"The Haves"	Vedder; Wotman; Klinghoffer	5:07
8.	"Good and Evil"	Vedder; Wotman; Klinghoffer; Smith	2:41
9.	"Rose of Jericho"	Vedder; Wotman; Klinghoffer; Smith	2:25
10.	"Try"	Vedder; Wotman; Klinghoffer; Smith	2:51
11.	"Picture" (with Elton John)	Vedder; Elton John; Wotman	3:59
12.	"Mrs. Mills"	Vedder; Wotman; Klinghoffer	4:04
13.	"On My Way"	Vedder; Wotman; Klinghoffer	2:08
Total length:			47:57

== Personnel ==
Musicians

- Eddie Vedder – vocals (all tracks), background vocals (1, 3, 4, 6, 9–11), guitar (1, 5, 6, 10, 13), keyboards (1), tenor guitar (3), drums (7), ukelin (8), piano (12), percussion (13)
- Andrew Watt – bass (1–7, 9–13), guitar (1–8, 11–13), keyboards (1, 13), background vocals (3–6, 10), piano (3), percussion (6, 7, 10), string arrangement (7, 12), drums (11), drum machine (12)
- Chad Smith – drums (1–6, 8–10), percussion (3, 5)
- Josh Klinghoffer – guitar (1–5, 7, 9, 10), keyboards (1, 3, 6–9, 12, 13), percussion (1, 2, 9), piano (1–3, 5–7, 9), bass (2, 8); background vocals, organ (5)
- Harper Vedder – background vocals (3)
- Benmont Tench – Hammond organ (3, 11)
- David Campbell – conductor, string arrangement (7, 12); horn arrangement, strings direction(12)
- Alyssa Park – concert master, violin (7, 12)
- Paula Hochhalter – cello (7, 12)
- Jacob Braun – cello (7, 12)
- Sara Parkins – violin (7, 12)
- Josefina Vergara – violin (7, 12)
- Tammy Hatwan – violin (7, 12)
- Olivia Vedder – background vocals (10)
- Stevie Wonder – harmonica (10)
- Abe Laboriel Jr. – drums, percussion (11)
- Elton John – vocals, background vocals, piano (11)
- Joshua Ranz – clarinet (12)
- Ringo Starr – drums, percussion (12)
- Steve Kujala – flute (12)
- Dylan Hart – French horn (12)
- Thomas Hooten – piccolo trumpet (12)
- Danny Long – piano (13)
- Edward Severson Jr. – vocals (13)

Technical

- Andrew Watt – production
- Randy Merrill – mastering
- John Burton –additional engineering (2, 11)
- Serban Ghenea – mixing
- Bryce Bordone – mix engineering (1, 2, 4–6, 8–13)
- Paul LaMalfa – engineering
- Marco Sonzini – engineering (1, 2, 4–6, 8–13), engineering assistance (3), additional engineering (7)
- Marc VanGool – guitar technician, studio assistance
- Steve Churchyard – engineering (7, 12)
- Scott Moore – engineering assistance (7, 12)
- Bettie Ross – production coordination (7, 12)
- Suzie Katayama – production coordination (7, 12)

Design

- Eddie Vedder (Note: Credited under the pseudonym "Jerome Turner".) – layout design, typeface
- Joe Spix – layout design, typeface
- Danny Clinch – photography

== Charts ==
Chart performance for Earthling
Chart (2022)	Peak position
Australian Albums (ARIA)	8
Austrian Albums (Ö3 Austria)	17
Belgian Albums (Ultratop Flanders)	5
Belgian Albums (Ultratop Wallonia)	7
Canadian Albums (Billboard)	27
Czech Albums (ČNS IFPI)	62
Dutch Albums (Album Top 100)	5
French Albums (SNEP)	149
German Albums (Offizielle Top 100)	6
Irish Albums (OCC)	41
Italian Albums (FIMI)	10
Polish Albums (ZPAV)	17
Portuguese Albums (AFP)	2
Scottish Albums (OCC)	9
Spanish Albums (PROMUSICAE)	37
Swiss Albums (Schweizer Hitparade)	3
UK Albums (OCC)	36
US Billboard 200	29
US Top Alternative Albums (Billboard)	2
US Top Rock Albums (Billboard)	1
