= Into the Wild (soundtrack) =

Studio album / soundtrack album by Eddie Vedder
- Released: September 18, 2007
- Recorded: 2007
- Studios: Studio X, Seattle, Washington
- Genre: Folk rock
- Length: 33:04
- Label: J
- Producers: Adam Kasper, Eddie Vedder

Eddie Vedder chronology
Into the Wild (2007)	Ukulele Songs (2011)

Alternate cover
- LP edition cover

Singles from Into the Wild
- 1. "Hard Sun" Released: September 21, 2007; 2. "Guaranteed" Released: September 18, 2007

Into the Wild is the debut solo studio album by Pearl Jam vocalist Eddie Vedder, and is based on his contributions to the soundtrack for the film of the same name. It was released on September 18, 2007, through J Records.

== Background ==
Director Sean Penn handpicked Vedder to provide the music for the film. Previously, Vedder had contributed two songs to the soundtrack for the 1995 film Dead Man Walking and a cover of the Beatles' "You've Got to Hide Your Love Away" to the soundtrack for the 2001 film I Am Sam, both of which starred Penn.

== Recording ==
The songs for the soundtrack were recorded in 2007 at Studio X in Seattle, Washington. Vedder worked with producer Adam Kasper, who had previously worked on Pearl Jam's 2002 album Riot Act, and 2006 album Pearl Jam. The album was mixed by Kasper and Vedder.

After viewing a rough cut of Into the Wild, Vedder quickly went to work writing songs for the film. After three days, Vedder gave Penn a range of material to work with. Penn placed into the film what Vedder had given him, and Vedder then went on to work on more material that Penn could add to the film. Vedder said that Penn "gave [him] a lot of freedom," and added that "the biggest thing was trust, which was just kind of unspoken." Vedder also said that having to write songs based on a narrative "simplified things." He said, "There were fewer choices. The story was there and the scenes were there." Vedder said that the songwriting process "grew" as Penn would ask him for more material.

Vedder described the recording process as a "factory." He said, "I'd just sit in the chair, and they'd hand me a fretless bass, and they'd hand me a mandolin, and they'd take a second to do the rough mix, and then I'd write the vocal, and it was just quick." On the recording sessions as a whole, Vedder stated, "It was like I kinda went into some weird space for a week or two, and then I woke up out of this daze, and it was done. I don't really remember it."

== Composition ==
Vedder's songs written for the film feature a folk sound. Thom Jurek of Allmusic called the soundtrack a "collection of folksy, rootsy tunes where rock & roll makes fleeting appearances." Vedder is primarily responsible for the songs in the film while film music composer Michael Brook is acknowledged in the film's credits for composing the film's original music. Vedder said, "Michael made great choices with the way he orchestrated the score...Our pieces of music meshed together pretty well for not having approached it in a way of making sure these puzzle pieces fit. They just did."

Vedder's cover of the song "Hard Sun" (originally written by Toronto-based singer-songwriter Gordon Peterson under his stage name Indio) features backing vocals by Corin Tucker of Sleater-Kinney. Vedder collaborated with singer-songwriter Jerry Hannan on the song "Society", written by Hannan. Both songs appear in the film along with a slew of other folky ballads by Vedder.

Vedder's songs help narrate the story of American wanderer Christopher McCandless. After graduating as a top student from Emory University, he decides to give up all of his money and travel. During forays into the Western United States and Mexico, McCandless decides to hitchhike to Alaska to live in the wilderness with little food and equipment, hoping to live a period of solitude. Nearly five months later, he died of starvation near Denali National Park and Preserve. Vedder said that he "realized the songs could now become another tool in the storytelling." On writing the songs about McCandless, Vedder stated, "It was startling how easy it was for me to get into his head. I found it to be uncomfortable how easy it was, because I thought I'd grown up."

== Release ==
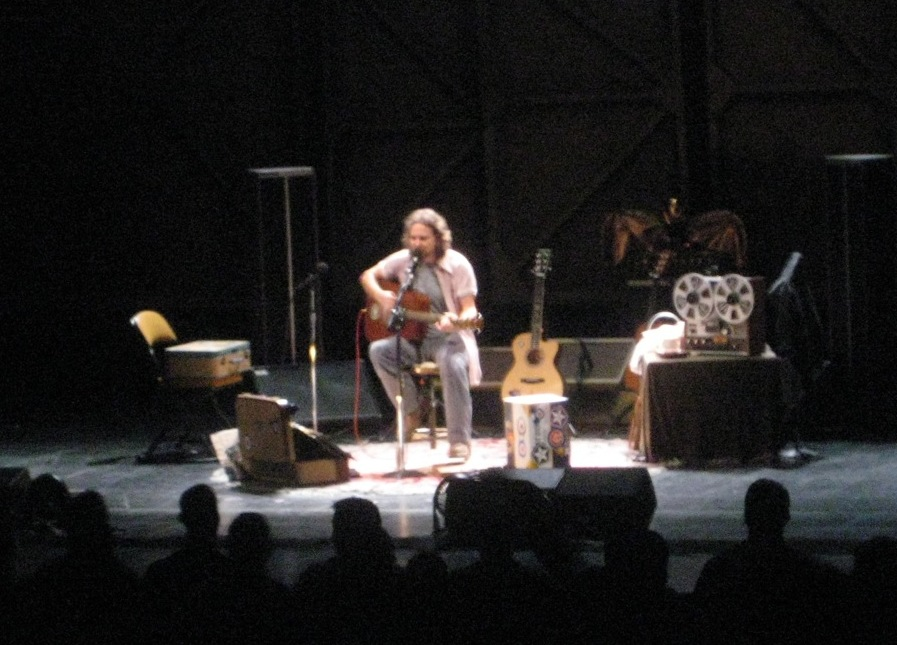
Eddie Vedder performing live at the Auditorium Theatre in Chicago, Illinois on August 21, 2008.

Into the Wild was released worldwide on September 18, 2007. It was released on CD, in both standard and Digipak formats, and LP. CD pressings of the album were released on J Records and LP versions were released on Vinyl Films—a record label owned by director Cameron Crowe, a friend of Vedder. In the United States, Into the Wild debuted at number 11 on Billboard 200, selling 39,000 copies in its first week, and also charted at number 11 on Billboard's Internet Albums and number 2 on the Soundtrack Albums chart. The album's lead single, "Hard Sun", peaked at number 17 on the Hot Modern Rock Tracks and number 13 on the Canadian Hot 100. Since its release, Into the Wild has sold 369,000 copies in the United States, according to Nielsen SoundScan, and has been certified Platinum in Italy and Gold in Switzerland.

=== Tour ===
Vedder promoted the Into the Wild soundtrack with his first solo tour, which began in April 2008. The April leg of the tour, dubbed the "April Fools Tour", began in Vancouver, British Columbia, Canada at The Centre on April 2, 2008, and was composed of ten dates focusing on the West Coast of the United States. Vedder continued the tour with a second leg in August 2008 composed of fourteen dates focusing on the East Coast and Canada. The second leg of the tour began in Boston, Massachusetts at the Boston Opera House and ended in Chicago, Illinois at the Auditorium Theatre.

== Reception ==
Professional ratings
Aggregate scores
Source	Rating
Metacritic	67/100
Review scores
Source	Rating
AllMusic	2.5/5 stars
Blender	3/5 stars
Entertainment Weekly	B
NME	5/10
Rolling Stone	3.5/5 stars
Spin	3.5/5 stars
Uncut	3/5 stars

Upon its release, Into the Wild received mostly positive reviews. At Metacritic, which assigns a normalized rating out of 100 to reviews from mainstream critics, the album received an average score of 67, based on 14 reviews, indicating "generally favorable reviews". Rolling Stone staff writer David Fricke gave Into the Wild three and a half out of five stars, saying that Vedder "[tosses] his weighty baritone onto earthy, folky tracks that temper the romance of absolute freedom with an eerie foreboding." Leah Greenblatt of Entertainment Weekly gave the album a B. She said "a real sense of the wide-open road permeates these nine original compositions." She ended her review by saying that "though the album is flawed (some tracks on the 33-minute disc are so brief that they never leave the ground), there is still something here that's compelling enough to stand alone." David Marchese of Spin gave the album three and a half out of five stars. He said, "The handful of somber, droning mood pieces don't really transcend their film-contingent origins, but on the actual full-length songs...Vedder's incantatory vocals and campfire instrumentation evoke the eerie beauty of untouched land." Jonah Weiner of Blender gave the album three out of five stars. He said, "It's the sound of a 24-year-old accepting death, as imagined by a lifelong misfit aging gracefully." Allan Jones of Uncut gave the album three out of five stars. He said, "Eddie here answers what you might be inclined to describe as the call of the wild with a series of mostly handsome, jangly folk-rock ballads."

Jamie Fullerton of NME gave Into the Wild a five out of ten. In the review, Fullerton states that "due to Vedder's interest in all things anti-corporate, McCandless' renouncement of materialism is celebrated rather than the fact that he eventually died." He also says that it is "accomplished but occasionally overbearingly earnest." AllMusic staff writer Thom Jurek gave the album two and a half out of five stars, saying that "musically there isn't enough imagination to distinguish [the songs], to set the tension of dynamic in motion."

"Hard Sun" was the most successful song from Into the Wild on the rock charts, reaching number 13 on the Modern Rock charts. Both "Hard Sun" and "Guaranteed" had accompanying music videos. Vedder won a 2008 Golden Globe Award for the song "Guaranteed" from Into the Wild. At the 2008 Grammy Awards, "Guaranteed" received a nomination for Best Song Written for a Motion Picture, Television or Other Visual Media. "Guaranteed" was also nominated for a 2008 World Soundtrack Award in the category of Best Original Song Written Directly for a Film. At the 2009 Grammy Awards, "Rise" received a nomination for Best Rock Vocal Performance, Solo.

Vedder was nominated for a Golden Globe for his contributions to the film's original score in 2008. Into the Wild was ranked at no. 20 on the list of Top 20 Rock 'n' Roll Solo Albums by Consequence of Sound.

== Track listing ==
All tracks are written by Eddie Vedder except where noted.

No.	Title	Length
1.	"Setting Forth"	1:37
2.	"No Ceiling"	1:34
3.	"Far Behind"	2:15
4.	"Rise"	2:36
5.	"Long Nights"	2:31
6.	"Tuolumne"	1:00
7.	"Hard Sun" (writer: Gordon Peterson)	5:22
8.	"Society" (writer: Jerry Hannan)	3:56
9.	"The Wolf"	1:32
10.	"End of the Road"	3:19
11.	"Guaranteed (Note: "Guaranteed" contains a hidden track, "Guaranteed (Humming Vocal)", at 4:40.)"	7:22
Total length:		33:04

Digital streaming bonus tracks
No.	Title	Length
12.	"No More"	3:38
13.	"Photographs"	1:00
14.	"Here's to the State (Note: "Here's to the State" was recorded live at VH1 Storytellers on May 31, 2006.)" (live) (writer: Phil Ochs)	5:52
15.	"No More" (live (Note: "No More" was recorded live at Goffertpark in Nijmegen, Netherlands on June 28, 2007.))	4:32
Total length:		43:28

LP bonus single
No.	Title	Length
1.	"No More"	3:38
2.	"No More" (live)	4:32
Total length:		8:10

== Personnel ==
All personnel credits adapted from Into the Wild's liner notes.

=== Performer ===
- Eddie Vedder – vocals, guitar, bass, mandolin (4), banjo (2), piano, organ, drums, percussion, producer, mixing, layout, design

=== Guest musicians ===
- Jerry Hannan – guitar, backing vocals (8)
- Corin Tucker – backing vocals (7)

=== Technical personnel ===
- Adam Kasper – producer, recording, mixing
- John Burton – engineer
- Sam Hofstedt – engineer
- Bob Ludwig – mastering
- George Webb III – technician
- Mike Kutchman – assistant technician

Design personnel

- Brad Klausen – layout, design
- Francois Duhamel – photography, artwork
- Chuck Zlotrick – photography, artwork
- Anton Corbijn – photography
- Sato Masuzawa – artistic facilitator

== Charts ==
Chart (2007)	Peak position
Australian ARIA Albums Chart	39
Belgian Albums Chart (Flanders)	40
Dutch Top 100	30
German Albums Chart	68
Irish Albums Chart	68
New Zealand RIANZ Top 40	34
Portuguese AFP Albums Chart	17
Spanish Albums Chart	89
Swiss Hitparade Albums Chart	28
UK Albums Chart	183
US Billboard 200	11
US Billboard Internet Albums	11
US Billboard Soundtrack Albums	2
Chart (2008)	Peak position
Belgian Albums Chart (Wa)	74
French SNEP Albums Chart	31
Italian FIMI Albums Chart	6
Chart (2014)	Peak position
Italian Albums (FIMI)	88

=== Singles ===
Year	Title	Peak chart positions	
Year	Title	US Mod	CAN
2007	"Hard Sun"	13	17

== Certifications ==
Region	Certification	Certified units/sales
Canada (Music Canada)	Gold	50,000^{^}
Denmark (IFPI Danmark)	Platinum	20,000^{‡}
Germany (BVMI)	Gold	100,000^{‡}
Italy (FIMI) sales since 2009	2× Platinum	100,000^{‡}
Netherlands (NVPI)	Gold	35,000^{^}
Switzerland (IFPI Switzerland)	Gold	15,000^{^}
United Kingdom (BPI)	Gold	100,000^{‡}
^{^} Shipments figures based on certification alone.^{‡} Sales+streaming figures based on certification alone.
