= Guaranteed (Eddie Vedder song) =

Song by Eddie Vedder

from the album Into the Wild
- Released: September 18, 2007
- Recorded: 2007
- Studio: Studio X, Seattle, Washington
- Genre: Folk rock
- Length: 3:05
- Label: J
- Songwriter(s): Eddie Vedder
- Producer(s): Adam Kasper, Eddie Vedder

"Guaranteed" is a song written and performed by Pearl Jam vocalist Eddie Vedder from the Into the Wild soundtrack (2007). It is the final track on the album, and also features a hidden track of "Guaranteed" (Humming Vocal) after about two minutes of silence following the regular version of "Guaranteed".

== Lyrics ==
Like the other songs on the soundtrack, "Guaranteed" is based on the story of American wanderer Christopher McCandless. After graduating as a top student from Emory University in 1990, McCandless decided to give up all of his savings and travel across the United States. In April 1992, McCandless hitchhiked to Alaska to live in the wilderness with little food and equipment, hoping to live a period of solitude. Nearly five months later, he died of starvation near Denali National Park and Preserve. Director Sean Penn said that as soon as he heard the song he "just felt that for sure this is the musical voice of (actor) Emile (Hirsch's) character." Eddie Vedder has said that the lyrics "Don't come closer or I'll have to go/Owning me like gravity are places that pull/If ever there was someone to keep me at home/It would be you" are for McCandless' sister, Carine.

== Reception ==
Vedder won a 2007 Golden Globe Award for "Guaranteed". At the 2008 Grammy Awards, "Guaranteed" received a nomination for Best Song Written for a Motion Picture, Television or Other Visual Media. "Guaranteed" was also nominated for the 2008 Broadcast Film Critics Association Award for Best Song, and a 2008 World Soundtrack Award in the category of Best Original Song Written Directly for a Film.

In The Netherlands, the song is heavily associated with the murdered crime reporter Peter R. de Vries, who used the first line of this song (“On bended knee is no way to be free”) as his life motto.

== Music video ==
The music video for "Guaranteed" was directed by Marc Rocco. The video features Vedder in a dark room performing the song amid a series of floating still images from Into the Wild. It premiered on January 7, 2008 on VH1.

== Live performances ==
"Guaranteed" was first performed live by Vedder at an Into the Wild post-screening party on the Paramount Pictures lot on November 2, 2007. He would go on to perform the song on his 2008 solo tour. It has also been performed once with Pearl Jam during their 2008 tour.
