= Ukulele Songs =

2011 album

Studio album by Eddie Vedder
- Released: May 31, 2011
- Recorded: 2010–2011
- Genre: Folk rock
- Length: 34:50
- Language: English
- Label: Monkeywrench
- Producer: Adam Kasper and Eddie Vedder

Eddie Vedder chronology
Into the Wild (2007)	Ukulele Songs (2011)	Earthling (2022)

Ukulele Songs is the second solo studio album by American singer and Pearl Jam frontman Eddie Vedder. It was released on May 31, 2011. The album is composed of original songs and new arrangements of several standards.

== Cover art ==
The cover art features a photograph of the underwater sculpture "The Lost Correspondent" by Jason deCaires Taylor at Moliniere Underwater Sculpture Park in Grenada.

== Critical reception ==
Professional ratings
Review scores
Source	Rating
AllMusic	3.6/5 stars
The A.V. Club	B−
Billboard	(favorable)
Entertainment Weekly	B
Los Angeles Times	(favorable)
Pitchfork	6.4/10

The album has been met with generally favorable reviews and currently has a 68% rating on Metacritic. Rolling Stone magazine gave the album three and a half stars, saying "The ukulele doesn't allow for the widest range of expression, which makes it a challenging foil for Eddie Vedder, who never met a feeling he couldn't drive through a wall. But this uke-suffused album stands up because he adapts the instrument to his idiosyncratic needs."

== Tours ==
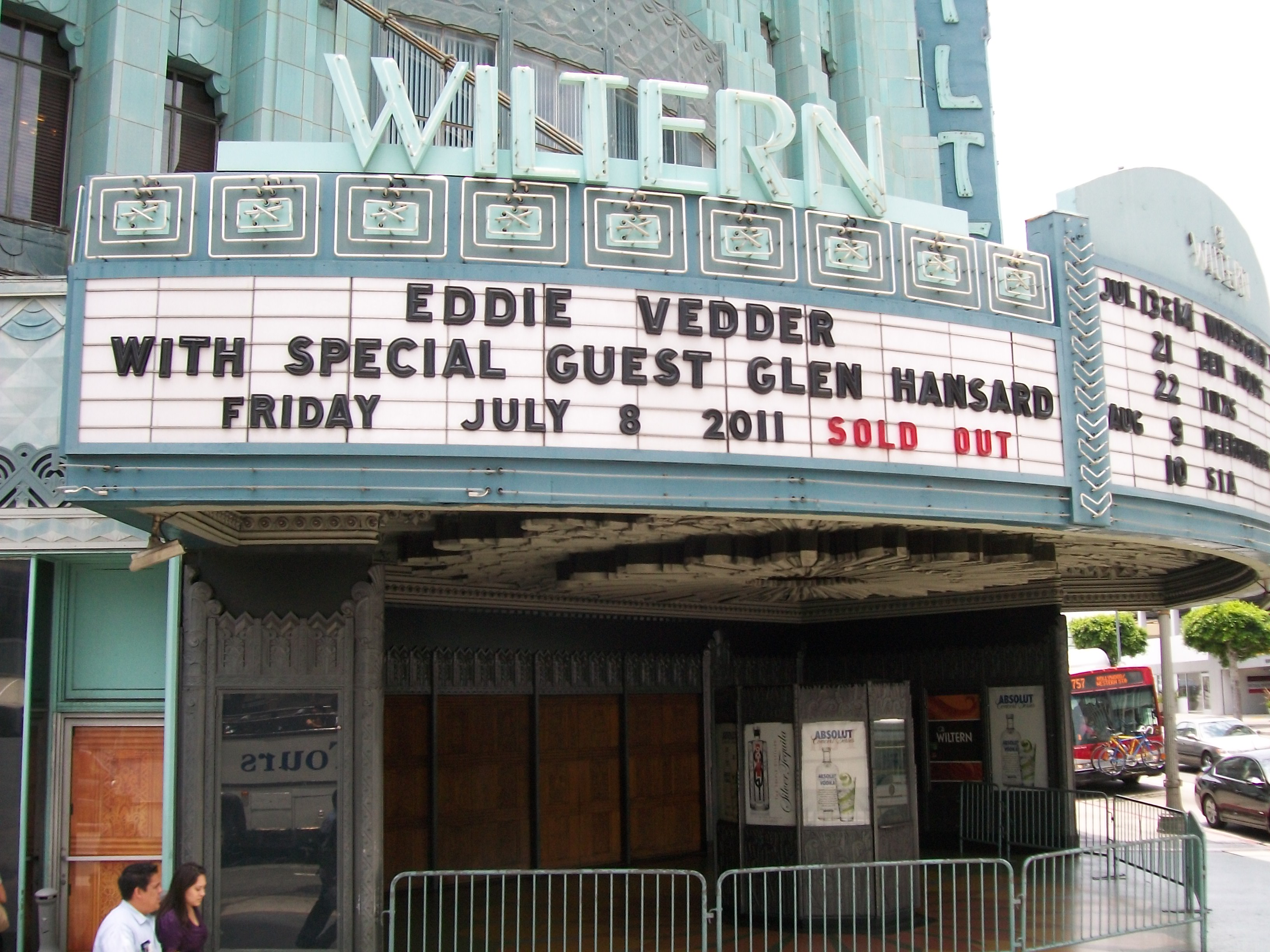
Sign outside the Wiltern Theatre, Los Angeles, in 2011

Eddie Vedder did a solo tour through various parts of North America to promote the album, with support from Glen Hansard.

Vedder stated that the shows would be performed in smaller venues than those used by Pearl Jam. He cites this as a relief, as he claims "It's hard to be subtle when the back row of the crowd is 200 yards away". The tour began on June 15, 2011 and finished on July 16 in Seattle. The tour received positive reviews from critics.

In 2012 Vedder was scheduled to play shows across the Southern United States beginning in April. However, these dates were postponed until November, after Vedder suffered temporary nerve damage in his right arm after an earlier injury to his back. European shows started in July 2012, which included his first solo shows in the United Kingdom.

== Track listing ==
All tracks are written by Eddie Vedder, except where noted.

Side one
No.	Title	Length
1.	"Can't Keep"	2:35
2.	"Sleeping by Myself"	1:54
3.	"Without You"	3:19
4.	"More Than You Know" (lyrics: Billy Rose & Edward Eliscu, music: Vincent Youmans)	2:25
5.	"Goodbye"	2:28
6.	"Broken Heart"	2:36
7.	"Satellite"	2:19

Side two
No.	Title	Length
8.	"Longing to Belong"	2:48
9.	"Hey Fahkah"	0:09
10.	"You're True"	3:23
11.	"Light Today"	2:41
12.	"Sleepless Nights" (featuring Glen Hansard) (lyrics & music: Felice Bryant & Boudleaux Bryant)	2:39
13.	"Once in a While" (lyrics: Bud Green, music: Michael Edwards)	1:45
14.	"Waving Palms"	0:37
15.	"Tonight You Belong to Me" (featuring Chan Marshall (Cat Power)) (lyrics: Billy Rose, music: Lee David)	1:42
16.	"Dream a Little Dream" (lyrics: Gus Kahn, music: Fabian Andre & Wilbur Schwandt)	1:29
Total length:		34:50

== Charts ==
=== Weekly charts ===
Chart (2011)	Peak position
Australian Albums (ARIA)	6
Austrian Albums (Ö3 Austria)	13
Belgian Albums (Ultratop Flanders)	12
Belgian Albums (Ultratop Wallonia)	25
Danish Albums (Hitlisten)	10
Dutch Albums (Album Top 100)	13
French Albums (SNEP)	64
German Albums (Offizielle Top 100)	18
Greek Albums (IFPI)	73
Irish Albums (IRMA)	13
Italian Albums (FIMI)	6
New Zealand Albums (RMNZ)	8
Norwegian Albums (VG-lista)	10
Portuguese Albums (AFP)	1
Spanish Albums (Promusicae)	23
Swedish Albums (Sverigetopplistan)	57
Swiss Albums (Schweizer Hitparade)	5
UK Albums (OCC)	49
US Billboard 200	4
US Top Rock Albums (Billboard)	2

=== Year-end charts ===
Chart (2011)	Position
US Billboard 200	177
US Top Rock Albums (Billboard)	32

== Certifications ==
Region	Certification	Certified units/sales
Canada (Music Canada)	Gold	40,000^{^}
^{^} Shipments figures based on certification alone.
