= Eddie Vedder =

American musician (born 1964)

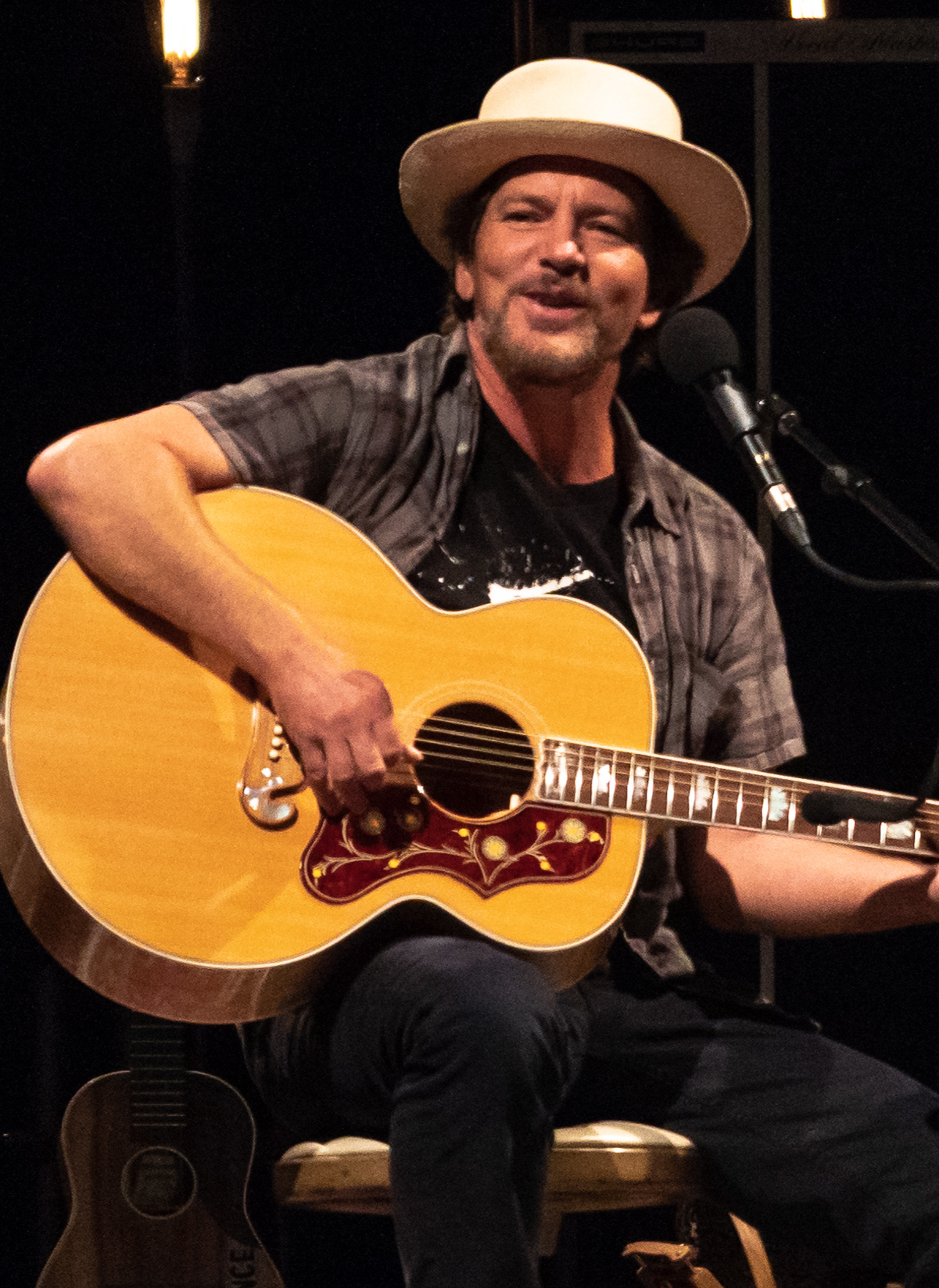
- Vedder in September 2018
- Born: Edward Louis Severson III; December 23, 1964 (age 61); Evanston, Illinois, U.S.
- Occupations: Singer; musician; songwriter
- Years active: 1988–present
- Spouses: Beth Liebling (m. 1994; div. 2000) Jill McCormick (m. 2010)
- Children: 2
- Musical career
- Origin: San Diego, California, U.S.
- Genres: Alternative rock; grunge; hard rock; folk rock
- Instruments: Vocals; guitar
- Labels: Universal Republic; Republic; J; Monkeywrench; Seattle Surf Co.
- Member of: Pearl Jam
- Formerly of: Bad Radio; Temple of the Dog; Hovercraft

Eddie Jerome Vedder (born Edward Louis Severson III, December 23, 1964) is an American musician who is the lead vocalist and primary lyricist for the rock band Pearl Jam. He was previously a guest vocalist for supergroup Temple of the Dog, a tribute band dedicated to singer Andrew Wood.

In 2007, Vedder released his first solo album as a soundtrack for the film Into the Wild (2007). His second album, Ukulele Songs, and a live DVD titled Water on the Road were released in 2011. His third solo album Earthling was released in 2022. In late June 2024, Vedder released a single cover of The English Beat's "Save It for Later" for the TV series The Bear.

Vedder, who is known for his baritone vocals, was ranked seventh on a list of "Best Lead Singers of All Time", based on a readers' poll compiled by Rolling Stone. In 2017, Vedder was inducted into the Rock and Roll Hall of Fame as a member of Pearl Jam.

== Early life and education ==
Vedder was born Edward Louis Severson III on December 23, 1964, in Evanston, Illinois, to Karen Lee Vedder and Edward Louis Severson Jr. His parents divorced in 1965 when Vedder was an infant. His mother soon married Peter Mueller. Vedder was raised believing that Mueller was his biological father, and he went by the name Edward Mueller for a time. Vedder's ancestry includes Dutch, German, English, and Danish on his mother's side (Vedder) and Norwegian on his father's side (Severson).

While living in Evanston, Vedder's family fostered seven younger children in a group home. In the mid-1970s, the family, including Vedder's three younger half-brothers, moved to San Diego County, California. Vedder received a guitar from his mother on his 12th birthday, and began turning to music and surfing as a source of comfort. He especially found solace in The Who's 1973 album, Quadrophenia. He said, "When I was around 15 or 16...I was all alone—except for music." His mother and Mueller divorced when Vedder was in his late teens. His mother and brothers moved back to the Chicago area, but Vedder remained with his stepfather in California so he did not have to change schools.

After the divorce, Vedder learned the truth about his parentage and learned that Mueller was really his stepfather. This discovery later inspired the song "Alive". As a child, Vedder briefly met his biological father, but was led to believe that Severson was merely an old friend of his parents. By the time Vedder learned the truth, Severson had died of multiple sclerosis. During his senior year at San Dieguito High School, Vedder moved out on his own to live in an apartment and supported himself with a nightly job at a drug store in Encinitas. Because of the pressure of work and school, Vedder dropped out of high school. He joined the rest of his family in the Chicago area and changed his last name to Vedder, his mother's maiden name.

In the early 1980s, while working as a waiter, Vedder earned his high school GED from Oakton Community College.

== Career ==
In 1984, Vedder returned to San Diego with his girlfriend Beth Liebling and his friend Frank. While living in the San Diego area, Vedder recorded demo tapes at his home and worked various jobs, including as a contracted security guard at the La Valencia Hotel in La Jolla. Vedder had several stints in San Diego area bands, including Surf and Destroy and the Butts. One of those bands, called Indian Style, included future Rage Against the Machine and Audioslave drummer Brad Wilk.

In 1988, Vedder became the vocalist for Bad Radio, a San Diego–based progressive funk rock band. The band's original incarnation was influenced by Duran Duran; however, after Vedder joined, the band moved to a more alternative rock sound influenced in part by the Red Hot Chili Peppers.

=== Temple of the Dog ===
In the 1980s, Vedder worked part time as a night clerk at a local gas station. Through the Southern California music scene, Vedder met former Red Hot Chili Peppers drummer Jack Irons, who became a friend and would play basketball with him. Later in 1990, Irons gave him the demo tape of a Seattle band looking for a singer. Vedder listened to the tape shortly before going surfing, where lyrics came to him. He wrote lyrics for three of the songs in what he later described as a "mini-opera" entitled Momma-Son. The songs tell the story of a young man who, like Vedder, learns that he had been lied to about his paternity and that his real father is dead, grows up to become a serial killer, and is eventually imprisoned and sentenced to death. Vedder recorded vocals for the three songs, and mailed the demo tape back to Seattle. The three songs would later become Pearl Jam's "Alive", "Once", and "Footsteps".

After hearing Vedder's tape, former Mother Love Bone members Stone Gossard and Jeff Ament invited Vedder to come to Seattle to audition for their new band. They were instantly impressed with his unique sound. At the time, Gossard and Ament were working on the Temple of the Dog project founded by Soundgarden's Chris Cornell as a musical tribute to Mother Love Bone's frontman Andrew Wood, who died of a heroin overdose at age 24. Soundgarden drummer Matt Cameron and newcomer Mike McCready were also a part of the project. The song "Hunger Strike" became a duet between Cornell and Vedder. Cornell later said that Vedder "sang half of that song not even knowing that I'd wanted the part to be there and he sang it exactly the way I was thinking about doing it, just instinctively."

Vedder also provided background vocals on several other Temple of the Dog songs. In April 1991, Temple of the Dog was released by A&M Records. "Hunger Strike" became Temple of the Dog's breakout single; it was also Vedder's first featured vocal on a record. "I really like hearing that song. I feel like I could be real proud of it – because one, I didn't write it, and two, it was such a nice way to be ushered onto vinyl for the first time. I'm indebted to Chris (Cornell) time eternal for being invited onto that track", Vedder said in 2009. In the 2011 documentary Pearl Jam Twenty, Vedder said, "That was the first time I heard myself on a real record. It could be one of my favorite songs that I've ever been on – or the most meaningful." Vedder and Cornell performed the song together for the last time on October 26, 2014, at a benefit for Bridge School.

=== Pearl Jam ===
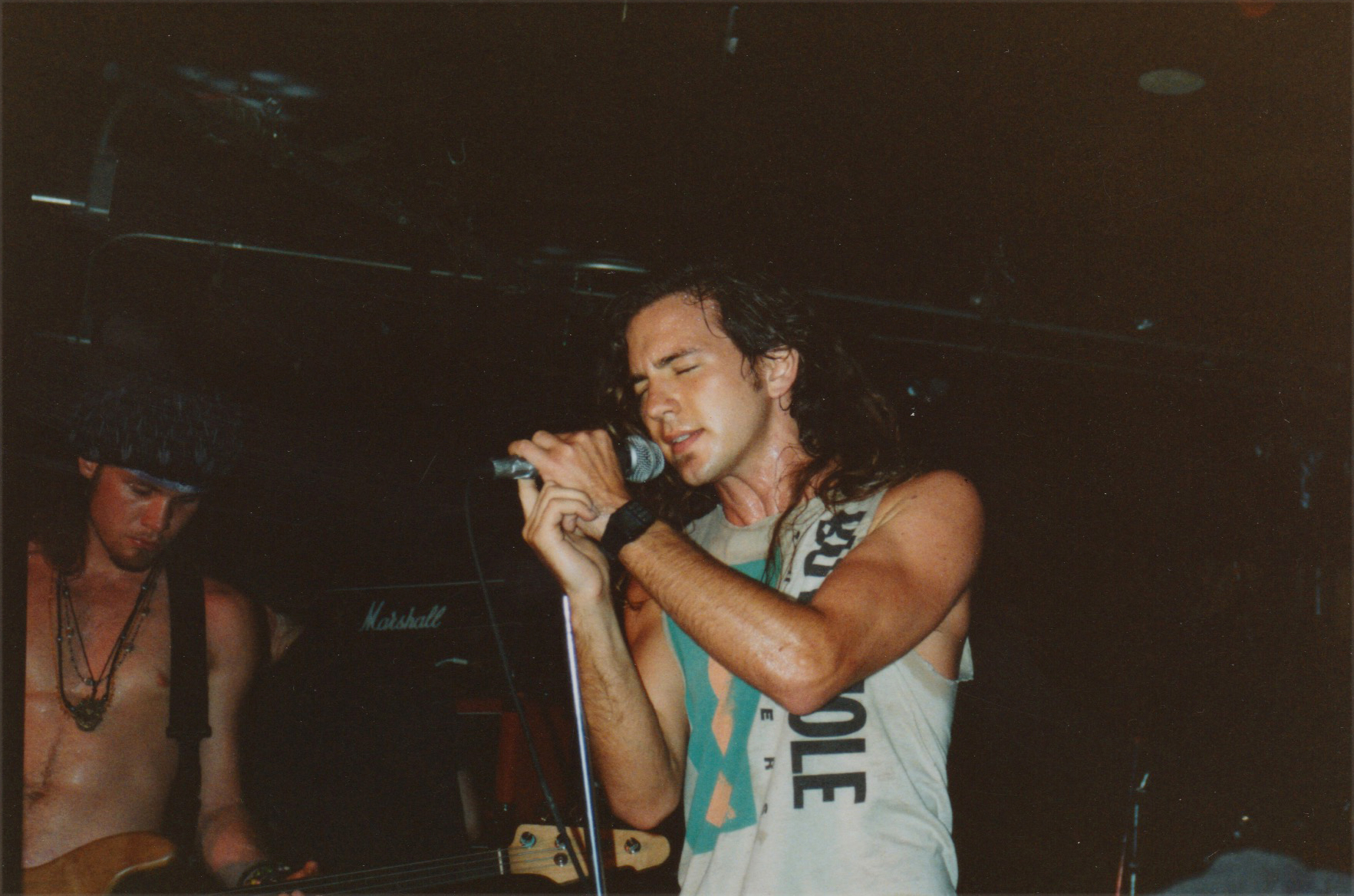
Vedder (right) with Pearl Jam in 1991

Pearl Jam, initially called Mookie Blaylock after the former National Basketball Association player of the same name, was formed in 1990 by Jeff Ament, Stone Gossard, and Mike McCready, who then recruited Vedder as lead singer but hired and fired three different drummers. The band was forced to change its name when they signed to Epic Records in 1991, becoming Pearl Jam, and instead naming their debut album Ten after Blaylock's jersey number.

Ten became one of the best-selling albums of the 1990s, being certified 13× Platinum. The single "Jeremy" received Grammy Award nominations for Best Rock Song and Best Hard Rock Performance in 1993. Pearl Jam received four awards at the 1993 MTV Video Music Awards for its music video for "Jeremy", including Video of the Year and Best Group Video. Ten ranks number 209 on Rolling Stone magazine's list of the 500 greatest albums of all time, and "Jeremy" was ranked number 11 on VH1's list of the 100 greatest songs of the '90s.

Vedder on the cover of the October 25, 1993, issue of Time as part of a feature article on the rising popularity of the grunge movement

Following an intense touring schedule, the band recorded its second studio album, Vs., which was released in 1993. Upon its release, Vs. set the record at the time for most copies of an album sold in a week, and spent five weeks at number one on the Billboard 200. Vs. was nominated for a Grammy Award for Best Rock Album in 1995. From Vs., the song "Daughter" received a Grammy nomination for Best Rock Performance by a Duo or Group with Vocal and the song "Go" received a Grammy nomination for Best Hard Rock Performance.

Feeling the pressures of success, with much of the burden of Pearl Jam's popularity falling on Vedder, the band decided to decrease the level of promotion for its albums, including refusing to release music videos. Vedder's issue with fame came from what he stated as "what happens when a lot of these people start thinking you can change their lives or save their lives or whatever and create these impossible fuckin' expectations that in the end just start tearing you apart." In 1994, the band began a much-publicized boycott of Ticketmaster, which lasted for three years and limited the band's ability to tour in the United States. Vedder faced what he called a "pretty intense stalker problem" during the mid-1990s. Vedder would refer to the issue in the song "Lukin" from No Code.

Later that same year the band released its third studio album, Vitalogy, which became the band's third straight album to reach multi-platinum status. On the album, Vedder was featured more extensively on rhythm guitar, and also provided back up vocals and some drumming. The pressure of fame is a common theme of Vedder's songs on the album. The album received Grammy nominations for Album of the Year and Best Rock Album in 1996. Vitalogy was ranked 485th on Rolling Stone magazine's list of the 500 greatest albums of all time. The lead single "Spin the Black Circle" won a Grammy Award in 1996 for Best Hard Rock Performance. Although Dave Abbruzzese performed on the album Vitalogy, he was fired in August 1994, four months before the album was released. The band cited political differences between Abbruzzese and the other members; for example, he disagreed with the Ticketmaster boycott. He was replaced by Jack Irons, a close friend of Vedder and the former and original drummer of the Red Hot Chili Peppers.

The band subsequently released No Code in 1996 and Yield in 1998. In 1998, prior to Pearl Jam's U.S. Yield Tour, Irons left the band due to dissatisfaction with touring. Pearl Jam enlisted former Soundgarden drummer Matt Cameron as Irons' replacement on an initially temporary basis, but he soon became the permanent replacement for Irons. "Do the Evolution" (from Yield) received a Grammy nomination for Best Hard Rock Performance. Vedder described Pearl Jam's approach in 1998, saying "We've had the luxury of writing our own job description...and that description has basically been cut down to just one line: make music."

In 1998, Pearl Jam recorded "Last Kiss", a cover of a 1960s ballad made famous by J. Frank Wilson and the Cavaliers. It was released on the band's 1998 fan club Christmas single; however, by popular demand, the cover was released to the public as a single in 1999. "Last Kiss" peaked at number two on the Billboard charts and became the band's highest-charting single.

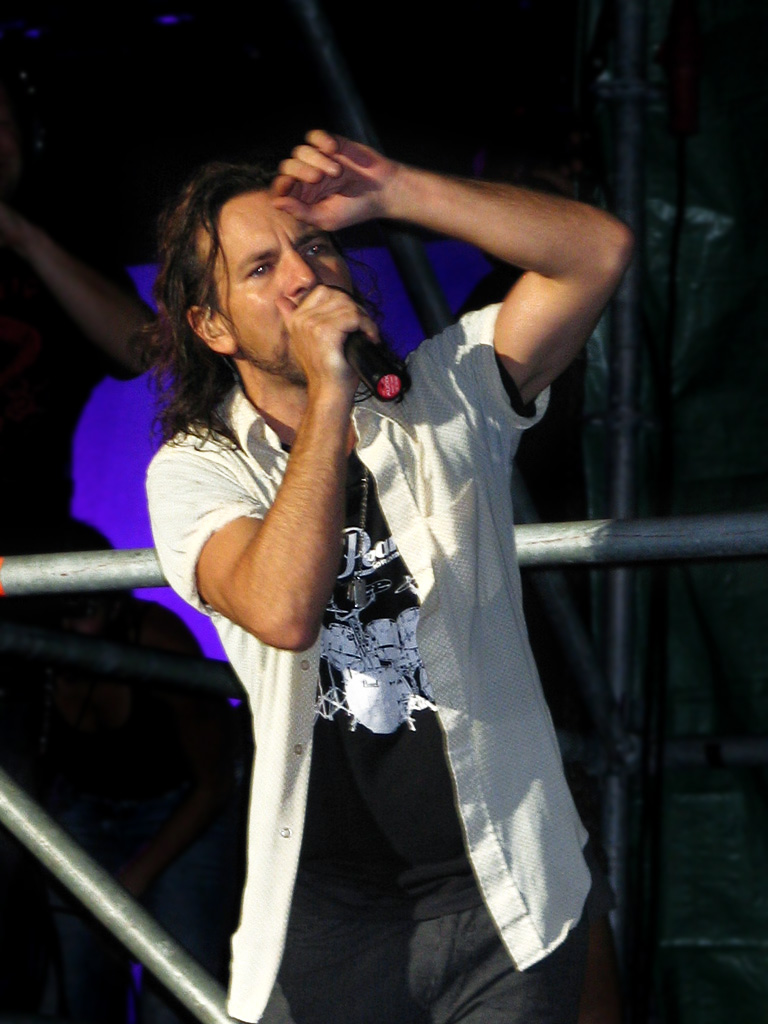
Vedder in September 2006

In 2000, the band released its sixth studio album, Binaural, and initiated a successful and ongoing series of official bootlegs. The band released seventy-two such live albums in 2000 and 2001, and set a record for most albums to debut in the Billboard 200 at the same time. "Grievance" (from Binaural) received a Grammy nomination for Best Hard Rock Performance. The band released its seventh studio album, Riot Act, in 2002. Pearl Jam's contribution to the 2003 film Big Fish, titled "Man of the Hour," was nominated for a Golden Globe Award in 2004. The band's eighth studio album, the self-titled Pearl Jam, was released in 2006. The band released its ninth studio album, Backspacer, in 2009, its tenth studio album, Lightning Bolt, in 2013, its eleventh studio album, Gigaton, in 2020, and its twelfth studio album, Dark Matter, in 2024.

Vedder uses the pseudonym "Jerome Turner" on Pearl Jam records for his non-musical contributions such as design and artwork. He has also used the pseudonym "Wes C. Addle" ("West Seattle").

== Other musical projects ==
=== Soundtrack contributions ===
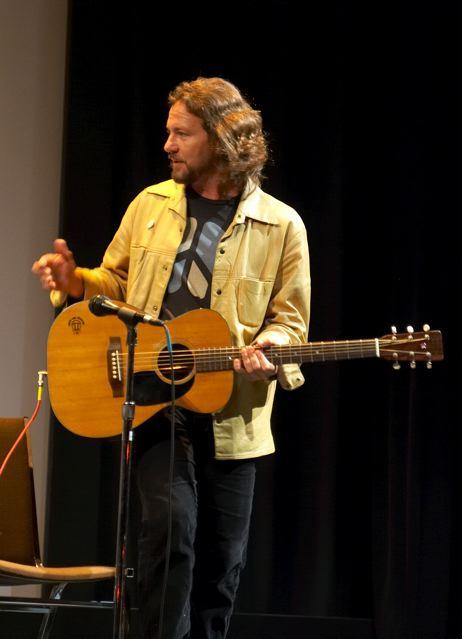
Vedder performing at Body of War's premiere in September 2007

Vedder has contributed solo material to several soundtracks and compilations, including the soundtracks for the films Dead Man Walking (1995), I Am Sam (2001), A Brokedown Melody (2004), Body of War (2007), and Reign Over Me (2007). Vedder collaborated with Pakistani musician Nusrat Fateh Ali Khan for his contributions to the Dead Man Walking soundtrack. He covered the Beatles' "You've Got to Hide Your Love Away" for the I Am Sam soundtrack. Vedder wrote "Man of the Hour" that Pearl Jam recorded for Tim Burton's Big Fish Soundtrack (2003). Vedder wrote two songs for the 2007 feature documentary, Body of War, produced by Ellen Spiro and Phil Donahue: "No More" (a song referring to the Iraq War) and "Long Nights". Vedder and the supergroup the Million Dollar Bashers, which includes members from Sonic Youth, Wilco, and Bob Dylan's band, covered Dylan's "All Along the Watchtower" for the biopic film, I'm Not There (2007). Pearl Jam recorded a cover version of The Who's song "Love, Reign o'er Me" for the film Reign Over Me, which takes its title from the song. In 2010, Vedder recorded a new song, "Better Days", which appeared on the soundtrack to the 2010 film Eat Pray Love. Vedder contributed original music for the soundtrack to the 2021 film Flag Day, which also featured the musical debut of Vedder's daughter Olivia on lead vocals in the first single, "My Father’s Daughter", written by Vedder and Glen Hansard.

=== Into the Wild ===
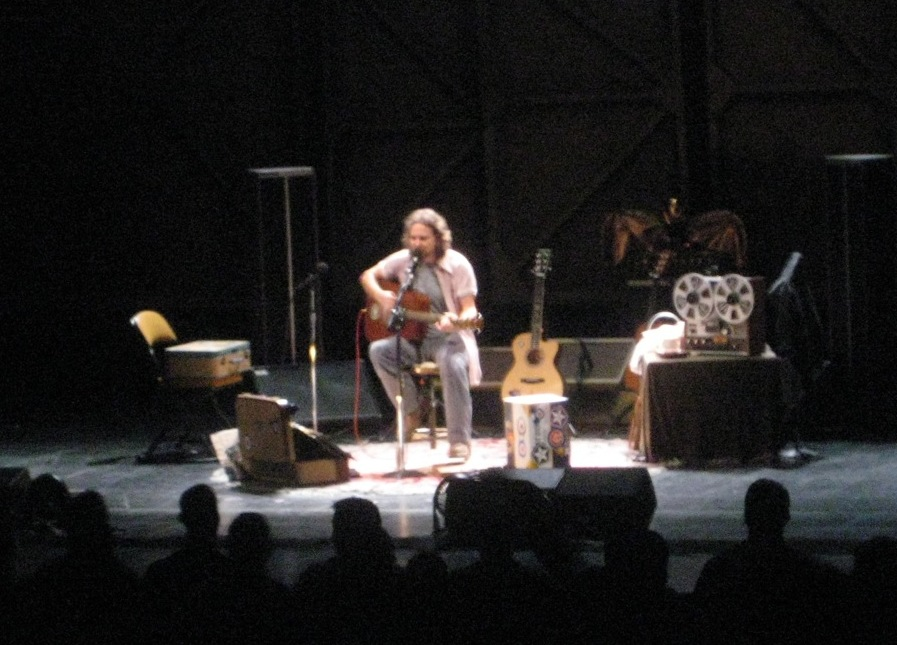
Vedder in August 2008

Vedder contributed an album's worth of songs to the soundtrack for the 2007 film, Into the Wild. The soundtrack was released on September 18, 2007, through J Records. It includes covers of the Indio song "Hard Sun" and the Jerry Hannan song "Society". Vedder said that having to write songs based on a narrative "simplified things". He said, "There were fewer choices. The story was there and the scenes were there." Vedder's songs written for the film feature a folk sound. Thom Jurek of AllMusic called the soundtrack a "collection of folksy, rootsy tunes where rock & roll makes fleeting appearances." Vedder won a 2008 Golden Globe Award for the song "Guaranteed" from Into the Wild. He was also nominated for a Golden Globe Award for his contributions to the film's original score. At the 2008 Grammy Awards, "Guaranteed" received a nomination for Best Song Written for a Motion Picture, Television or Other Visual Media. "Guaranteed" was also nominated a 2008 World Soundtrack Award in the category of Best Original Song Written Directly for a Film. At the 2009 Grammy Awards, "Rise" received a nomination for Best Rock Vocal Performance, Solo.

Vedder promoted the Into the Wild soundtrack with his first solo tour, which began in April 2008. The April leg of the tour, dubbed the "April Fools Tour", began in Vancouver, British Columbia, Canada at The Centre on April 2, 2008, and was composed of ten dates focusing on the West Coast of the United States. Vedder continued the tour with a second leg in August 2008 composed of fourteen dates focusing on the East Coast and Canada. The second leg of the tour began in Boston, Massachusetts at the Boston Opera House and ended in Chicago, Illinois at the Auditorium Theatre. In June 2009, Vedder followed his 2008 solo tour with another solo tour composed of fourteen dates focusing on the Eastern United States and Hawaii, which began in Albany, New York at the Palace Theatre and continued through to Honolulu at the Hawaii Theatre.

=== Ukulele Songs ===
Vedder released his second solo album titled Ukulele Songs, a collection of original songs and covers performed on the ukulele, on May 31, 2011. The first single from the album, "Longing to Belong", was released through digital retailers on March 21. A live DVD titled Water on the Road, featuring live performances from two shows in Washington, D.C. during Vedder's 2008 solo tour, was released the same day as Ukulele Songs.

=== Earthling ===
In September 2021, Vedder released the single "Long Way", taken from his third studio album Earthling. This was followed by "The Haves" on November 18, 2021, and "Brother the Cloud" on January 14, 2022. "Long Way" and "The Haves" have been released as a limited edition 7" vinyl. To tour the album, Vedder assembled a backing band dubbed "The Earthlings", which includes Glen Hansard on rhythm guitar and backing vocals, Josh Klinghoffer on guitar, keyboard and vocals, Chad Smith on drums, Chris Chaney on bass, and guitarist Andrew Watt. Watt also produced the album.

=== Collaborations ===
In addition to playing with Pearl Jam and Temple of the Dog, Vedder has performed or recorded with numerous well-known artists. He has appeared on albums by the Who, Ramones, Neil Young, R.E.M., Neil Finn, Bad Religion, Mark Seymour, Cat Power, Mike Watt, Fastbacks, Wellwater Conspiracy, Jack Irons, and John Doe, and has also recorded with the Strokes, Nusrat Fateh Ali Khan, Supersuckers, Susan Sarandon, and Zeke. In the months of June and July 2006, Vedder made live performances jamming with Tom Petty and the Heartbreakers, singing on many tracks, including lead vocals on "The Waiting" and backing vocals on "American Girl". Vedder performed the songs "Break on Through (To the Other Side)", "Light My Fire" and "Roadhouse Blues" with the remaining members of the Doors at the 1993 Rock and Roll Hall of Fame induction ceremony. He also performed with R.E.M. at the 2007 Rock and Roll Hall of Fame induction ceremony and with the Stooges at the 2010 Rock and Roll Hall of Fame induction ceremony. Vedder made a guest appearance at the Ramones' last show on August 6, 1996, at the Palace in Hollywood.

== Film ==
Vedder had a brief acting cameo in the 1992 movie, Singles, along with Jeff Ament and Stone Gossard of Pearl Jam. He appeared as himself, playing drums in lead actor Matt Dillon's backing band, Citizen Dick. He was also interviewed for the 1996 grunge documentary, Hype! He appears in the 2003 Ramones documentary, End of the Century: The Story of the Ramones. In 2007, he made a cameo as himself in the comedy film, Walk Hard: The Dewey Cox Story. He appears in the 2007 Tom Petty documentary, Runnin' Down a Dream, the 2008 political documentary, Slacker Uprising, and the 2009 Howard Zinn documentary, The People Speak, based upon A People's History of the United States. He was featured in the 2008 Greg Kohs documentary, Song Sung Blue, performing with Lightning and Thunder. He had a one-scene cameo in the second episode of the second season of the IFC television show Portlandia. He also appears in the 2012 documentary West of Memphis, protesting against the case. Vedder made an appearance in the season 3 episode 16 of David Lynch's Twin Peaks Aug 2017. He was referred to by his birth name, Edward Louis Severson.

The character of Jackson Maine in the movie A Star is Born was partly influenced by Vedder. Bradley Cooper, who wrote the screenplay, produced, directed, and starred in the film as Jackson Maine, hung out with Vedder for four or five days to get some tips from him about the character.

Matter of Time, a documentary concert film highlighting Vedder's attempts to raise awareness for the rare disease epidermolysis bullosa, premiered at the Tribeca Film Festival in the summer of 2025.

== Activism ==
Vedder has used his role as a musician to speak on several politically-oriented themes. In 2009, he said, "People on death row, the treatment of animals, women's right to choose. So much in America is based on religious fundamentalist Christianity. Grow up! This is the modern world!" In 1992, Spin printed an article by Vedder, titled "Reclamation", which detailed his views on abortion. Vedder and Pearl Jam performed at Rock for Choice in 1994. During the band's appearance on MTV Unplugged in 1992, Vedder stood up on his stool during the instrumental break of the song "Porch" and wrote "PRO-CHOICE" on his left arm with a magic marker.

Vedder was supportive of Green Party presidential candidate Ralph Nader in 2000 and played at Green Party super rallies in Chicago and New York City. Pearl Jam played a series of concerts on the 2004 Vote for Change tour, supporting the candidacy of John Kerry for U.S. president. "I supported Ralph Nader in 2000, but it's a time of crisis. We have to get a new administration in", Vedder told Rolling Stone magazine in 2004. In 2005, during Pearl Jam's first South American tour, Vedder said, "next time we come to Brazil, the world will be a better place to live, as George Bush will no longer be the President of the United States." Vedder supported Barack Obama in the 2008 presidential election, and 2012, Bernie Sanders in the 2016 and 2020 primaries, Hillary Clinton in the 2016 presidential election, and Joe Biden in the 2020 presidential election against Donald Trump.

In his spare time, Vedder is a surfer and active in surf-related conservation efforts, including supporting The Surfrider Foundation. In 1993, Vedder supported fellow Surfrider Foundation member/environmentalist, Aaron Ahearn who had gone AWOL from the United States Navy in protest of the Navy's at sea dumping policies. Vedder and Pearl Jam performed a concert in San Francisco, donating over $3,000 to Ahearn's legal fees.

Vedder supports Earth First! with a tattoo on his right calf. The logo is of a pipe wrench crossed with a stone hammer.

Vedder was a longtime and outspoken supporter for the Free the West Memphis Three movement, a cause that advocated the release of three young men who were convicted in 1994 of the gruesome murders of three boys in West Memphis, Arkansas. In an interview with Larry King on December 19, 2007, Damien Echols, who was then on death row for the murders, said that Vedder had been the "greatest friend a person could have" and that he had collaborated with him while in prison. The song "Army Reserve" on Pearl Jam's 2006 self-titled album features a lyrical collaboration between Vedder and Echols. On August 19, 2011, Vedder and Natalie Maines attended the release hearing of the West Memphis Three.

Vedder is a gun-control activist and has performed at benefit anti-gun violence concerts and participated on the 2019 Gun Sense Forum.

== Musical style and influences ==
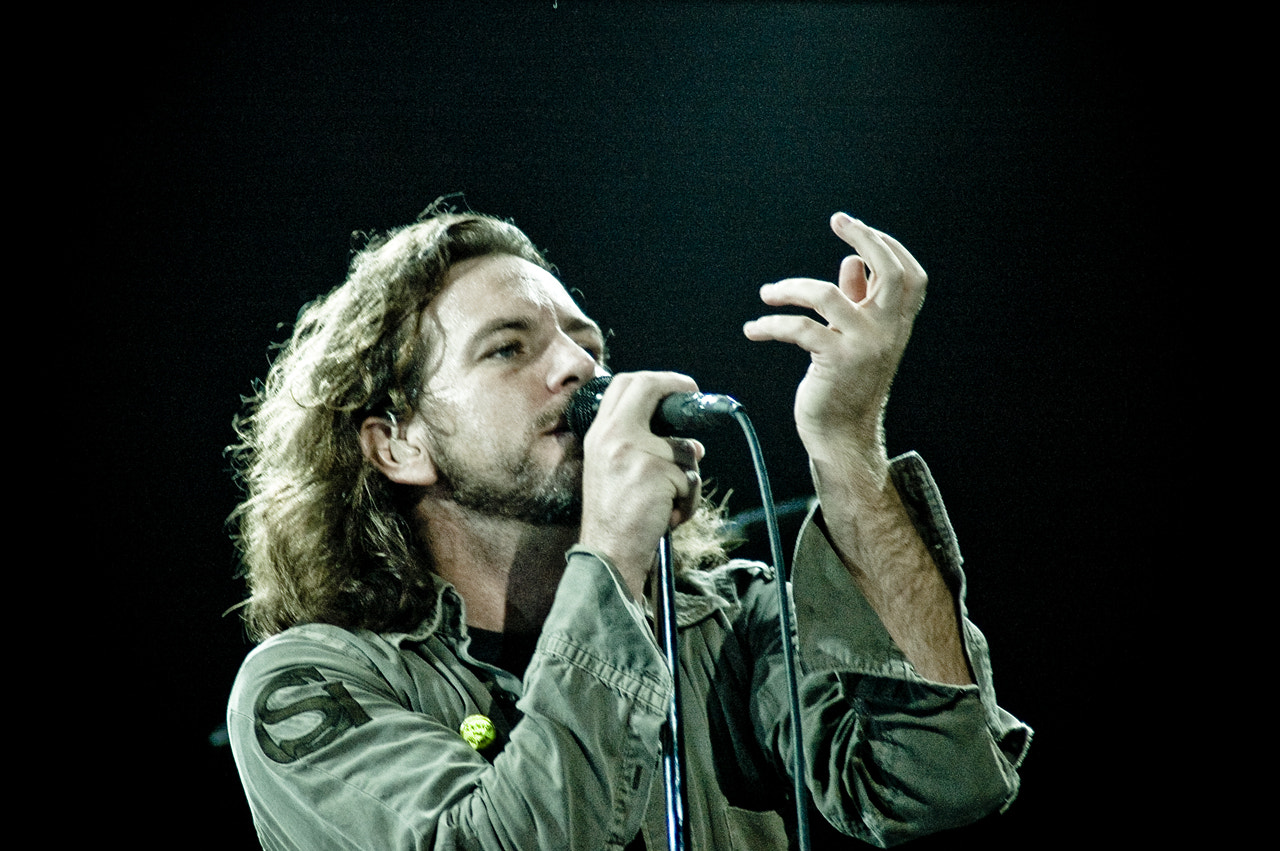
Vedder performing in 2005

Music critic Jim DeRogatis has described Vedder's vocals as a "Jim Morrison-like vocal growl". Greg Prato of AllMusic said, "With his hard-hitting and often confessional lyrical style and Jim Morrison-esque baritone, Vedder also became one of the most copied lead singers in all of rock." Vedder has inducted Aerosmith, the Doors, Neil Young, the Ramones, and R.E.M. into the Rock and Roll Hall of Fame, and in his induction speeches he has cited them all as influences. Other influences that Vedder has cited include Pete Townshend and the Who, which the singer considers to be his favorite band of all time, the Beatles, Bruce Springsteen, Pink Floyd, Talking Heads, Fugazi, and the Clash.

Vedder's lyrical topics range from personal ("Alive", from Ten; "Better Man", from Vitalogy) to social and political concerns ("Even Flow", from Ten; "World Wide Suicide", from Pearl Jam). His lyrics have often invoked the use of storytelling and have included themes of freedom, individualism, and sympathy for troubled individuals. Other recurring themes include the use of water metaphors, and the concept of leaving everything behind to start again, which is featured in "Rearviewmirror", from Vs.; "MFC", from Yield; "Evacuation", from Binaural; and "Gone", from Pearl Jam).

Although primarily a vocalist, Vedder began playing guitar on some Pearl Jam songs with the Vs. songs "Rearviewmirror" and "Elderly Woman Behind the Counter in a Small Town". When the band started, Gossard and McCready were clearly designated as rhythm and lead guitarists, respectively. The dynamic began to change when Vedder started to play more rhythm guitar during the Vitalogy era. McCready said in 2006, "Even though there are three guitars, I think there's maybe more room now. Stone will pull back and play a two-note line and Ed will do a power chord thing, and I fit into all that." Vedder's guitar playing helped the band's sound progress toward a more stripped-down style; the songs "Rearviewmirror" and "Corduroy" (from Vitalogy) feature Vedder's raw, punk-influenced guitar playing. As he had more influence on the band's sound, Vedder sought to make the band's musical output less catchy. He said, "I felt that with more popularity, we were going to be crushed, our heads were going to pop like grapes." He has also contributed performances on the ukulele, harmonica, accordion, and electric sitar to various Pearl Jam recordings.

=== Live performances ===
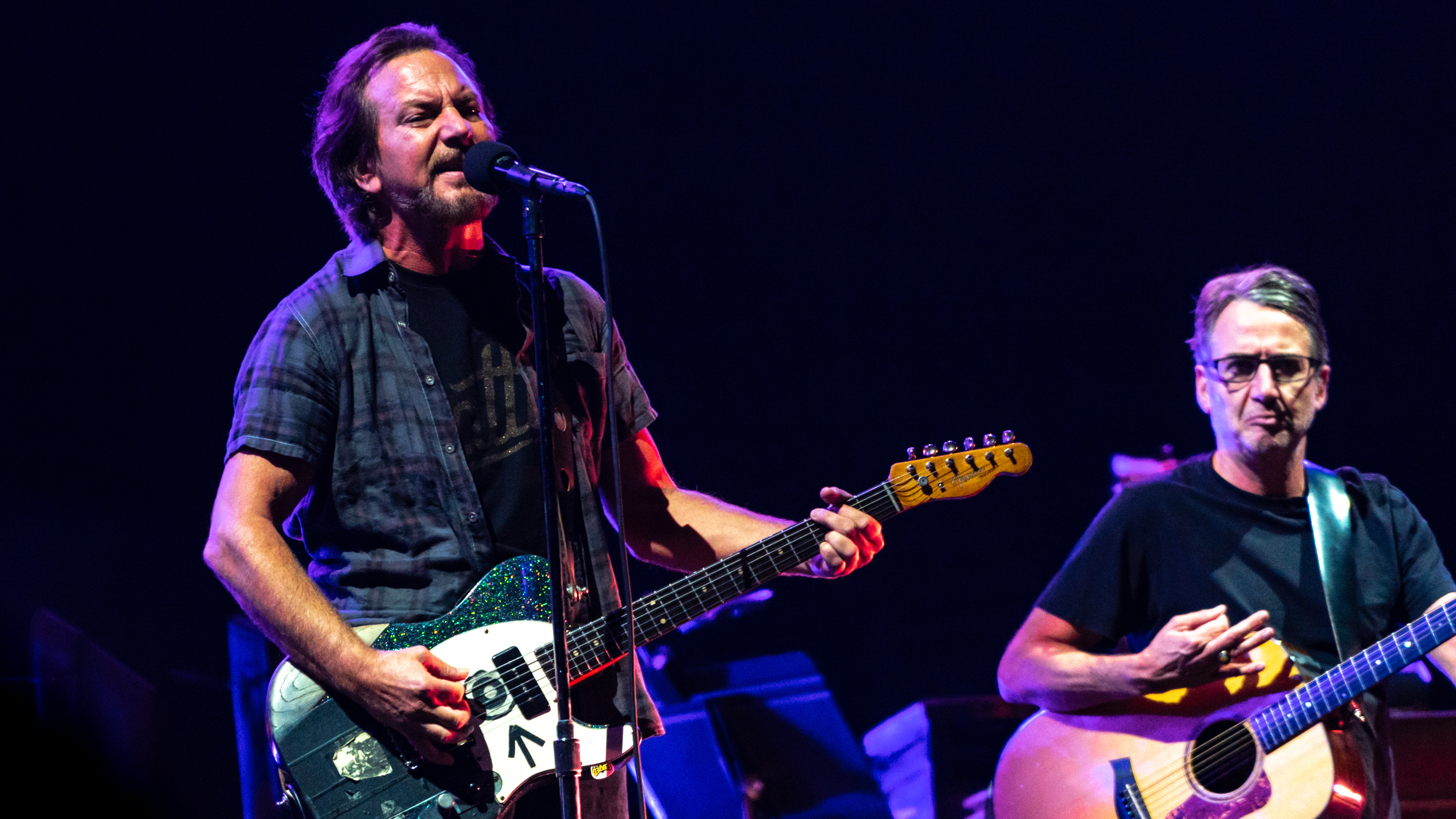
Vedder (left) with Pearl Jam in June 2018

Throughout Pearl Jam's career, Vedder has interacted with the crowd during the band's concerts. Early in Pearl Jam's existence, Vedder and the band became known for their intense live performances. Vedder participated in stage diving as well as crowd surfing. During the early part of Pearl Jam's career, Vedder was known to climb the stage lighting rig and hang from the stage roof. Looking back at this time, Vedder said, "It's hard for us to watch early performances, even though that's when people think we were on fire and young. Playing music for as long as I had been playing music and then getting a shot at making a record and at having an audience and stuff, it's just like an untamed force...a different kind of energy. And I find it kind of hard to watch those early performances because it's so just fucking, semi-testosterone-fueled or whatever. But it didn't come from jock mentality. It came from just being let out of the gates."

Vedder began incorporating social commentary and political criticism into his lyrics and performances early in his career with Pearl Jam. He usually comments on politics between songs, often to criticize U.S. foreign policy. During Pearl Jam's 2007 Lollapalooza headlining show, Vedder and the band played a song telling the crowd in Chicago to boycott the oil company BP because they had been polluting Lake Michigan.

Vedder is known to use a Mike Lull-modified, vintage Fender Telecaster that features a single coil pickup in the bridge position and a P-90 pickup in the neck position, as well as various stickers as a tribute to his favorite band of all time, The Who. He uses three vintage Fender Tweed amplifiers, including a 1959 Deluxe and a 1957 Custom Twin. His two main acoustic guitars are a 1930s-era Martin 00-17 and a vintage Gibson Pete Townshend Signature SJ-200.

== Legacy ==
"I just love to hear Eddie sing. I think he's got such a distinctive, fabulous voice. He doesn't copy, so that's what I like; he does the Eddie Vedder version. It's never easy to do because most people will just try and copy what the Who have done. He's always himself."

— Roger Daltrey discussing Vedder's singing.

Lamenting the constant waning of rock 'n roll from the music scene, Bono, in 2017, expounded that "Rage" is the fundamental component of rock 'n roll and said, "Some great rock’n’roll tends to have that, which is why the Who were such a great band. Or Pearl Jam. Eddie has that rage."

Vedder was ranked seventh on a list of "Best Lead Singers of All Time" compiled by Rolling Stone. Loudwire put him at number 35 on their Top 66 Hard Rock + Heavy Metal Frontmen of all time. He has been ranked at number 5 on a list of "Singer with the Most Unique Voice", compiled by Rolling Stone. Singers Roger Daltrey of the Who, Bruce Dickinson of Iron Maiden, and drummer John Densmore of the Doors have praised him for his singing ability. Hit Parader magazine placed him at number 23 on their list of the "Top 100 Metal Vocalists of All Time". His solo album Into the Wild was ranked at number 20 on the list of "Top 20 Rock 'n' Roll Solo Albums" by Consequence of Sound. In 2023, Rolling Stone ranked Vedder at number 105 on its list of the 200 Greatest Singers of All Time.

== Personal life ==
Eddie Vedder's August 3, 2007, Wrigley Field visit

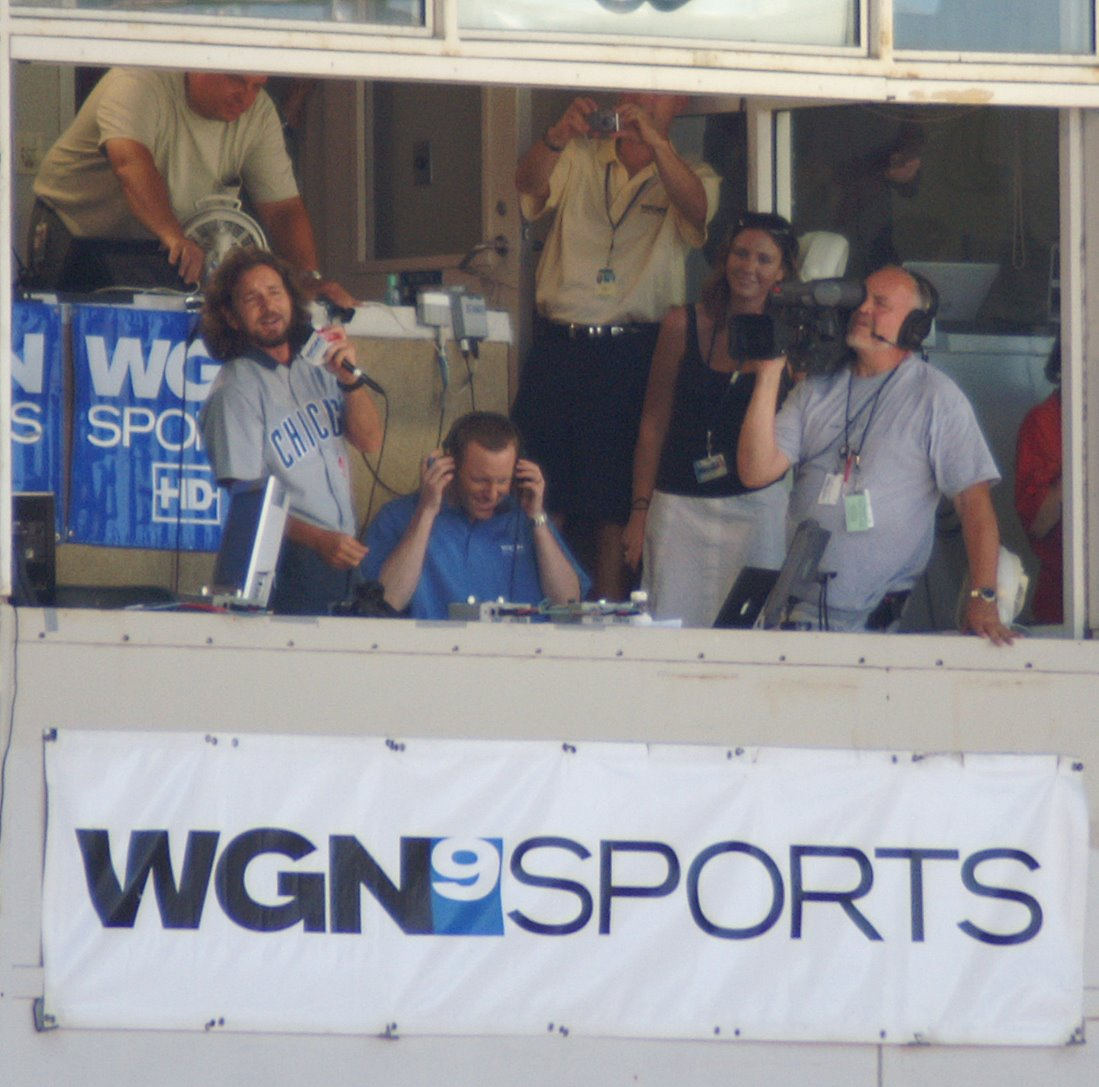
Singing "Take Me Out to the Ball Game" during seventh-inning stretch

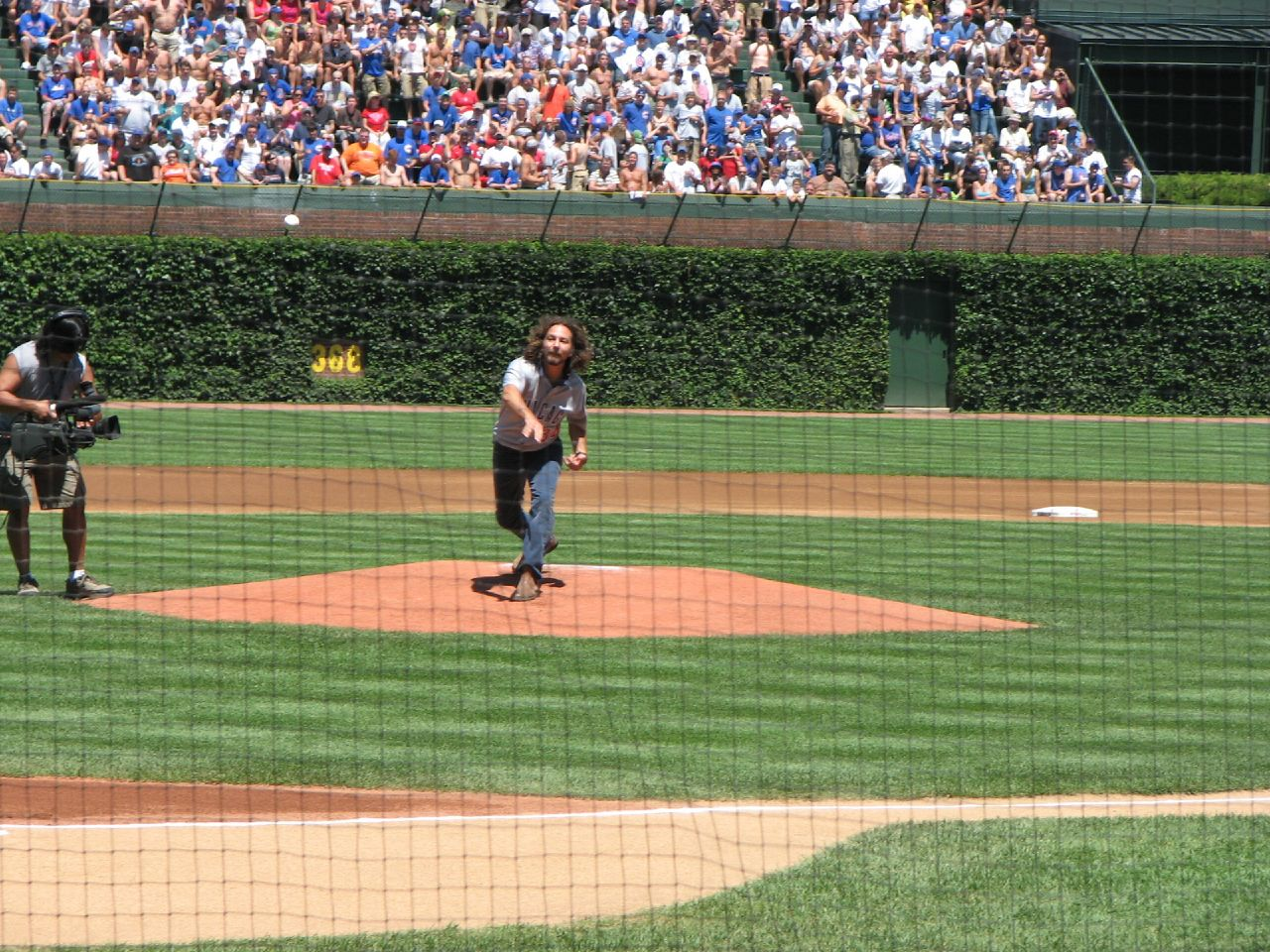
Throwing ceremonial first pitch

Vedder attended San Dieguito High School, now called San Dieguito Academy, and donated proceeds from a 2006 Pearl Jam concert in San Diego toward the construction of a theater for the school in the name of his former drama teacher, Clayton E. Liggett. Liggett was Vedder's mentor in high school. Vedder wrote the song "Long Road" (from Merkin Ball) upon hearing of Liggett's death in 1995.

While living in the basement of Pearl Jam manager Kelly Curtis' house in Seattle in the early 1990s, Vedder was roommates with Alice in Chains guitarist and vocalist Jerry Cantrell. Vedder was also friends with Alice in Chains' lead singer Layne Staley, and wrote the song "4/20/02" (from Lost Dogs) on the night that he found out about Staley's death, on April 20, 2002 (though Staley had died over two weeks earlier on April 5, his body was found on April 19). Vedder also paid tribute to Staley during a Pearl Jam show in Chicago on August 22, 2016, which would have been Staley's 49th birthday; "It's the birthday of a guy called Layne Staley tonight, and we're thinking of him tonight too. 49 years old", Vedder told the crowd before dedicating the song "Man of the Hour" to his late friend.

In 1994, Vedder married Hovercraft bass player Beth Liebling, whom he had dated since he was a teenager, circa 1984. Vedder was Hovercraft's drummer during their opening slot for Mike Watt's U. S. tour in 1995. The couple divorced in September 2000. In an interview published in the June 29, 2006, edition of Rolling Stone magazine, Vedder said that his divorce from Liebling had devastated him. The divorce happened around the same time as an incident where nine fans were crushed to death during Pearl Jam’s set at the Roskilde Festival in Denmark on June 30, 2000. In an interview with Chris Cornell's daughter Lily in 2020, Vedder explained that their show started on a high because they had just been told about her birth, until about 40 minutes into their performance when the tragedy happened. Vedder revealed that Pete Townshend helped him through the early stages of dealing with the tragedy.

On September 18, 2010, Vedder married his longtime girlfriend, model Jill McCormick, whom he had been dating since 2000. They have two daughters, born in 2004 and in 2008. In 2011, McCormick appeared in the music video for Vedder's solo single, "Longing to Belong". In 2014, Vedder and McCormick co-founded the EB Research Partnership, a non-profit organization dedicated to finding a cure for the genetic skin disorder epidermolysis bullosa. They have raised over US$25 million to fund research to find a cure.

Vedder was a close friend of Chris Cornell, the Soundgarden and Audioslave frontman. Aside from Vedder's Pearl Jam bandmates, Cornell was one of the first people Vedder met after moving to Seattle in 1990. The two were neighbors for a while and shared vocal duties in Temple of the Dog. In the 2009 book Grunge Is Dead: The Oral History of Seattle Rock Music, Soundgarden manager Susan Silver recalled that Cornell carried Vedder onstage on his shoulders at Pearl Jam's second show in Seattle (the band was known as Mookie Blaylock at the time): "Everyone was still reeling from [Andrew Wood]'s death... The band came on and Chris carried Eddie onto the stage – he was on his shoulders. It was one of those super powerful moments, where it was all a big healing for everybody. He came out as this guy who had all the credibility in the world – in terms of people in Seattle – and Malfunkshun and Mother Love Bone were loved bands. Andy was such an endearing personality. It was a hard thing to do – to show up after people die. And Chris bringing Eddie out, and pointing at him, as much." Pearl Jam lead guitarist Mike McCready recalled that Cornell had helped welcome the "super, super shy" Vedder to Seattle: "He was like, 'Hey, welcome to Seattle. I love Jeff [Ament] and Stone [Gossard]. I give you my blessing.' From then on [Vedder] was more relaxed. It was one of the coolest things I saw Chris do." In a 2009 interview with Uncut magazine, Vedder stated that Cornell is "the best singer that we've got on the planet". About the impact that Cornell had in his life, Vedder told a crowd in Alpine Valley before performing "Hunger Strike" with him in September 2011; "I had no idea how he would affect my life and my views on music and my views on friendship and what a big impact he would have. These guys [the other members of Pearl Jam] know him much longer than me and his impact is profound". The friendship between Vedder and Cornell is featured in the 2011 documentary Pearl Jam Twenty. During his solo concert in London on June 6, 2017, Vedder talked for the first time about Cornell since his death on May 18, 2017, saying that "he wasn't just a friend, he was someone I looked up to like my older brother" and "I will live with those memories in my heart and I will love him forever".

Vedder is a friend of The Who guitarist Pete Townshend, who discouraged Vedder from retiring in 1993. In late 2007, Vedder wrote the foreword to a new Pete Townshend biography, Who Are You: The Life of Pete Townshend. The book was published in the U. K. in March 2008 and in the U. S. in October 2008. Vedder was a close friend of Ramones guitarist Johnny Ramone, with Vedder being at his side when he died. Since Ramone's death, Vedder and Pearl Jam have played the Ramones' "I Believe in Miracles" regularly at live shows. While driving home from Ramone's funeral, Vedder wrote the lyrics for the Pearl Jam song "Life Wasted" (from Pearl Jam).

Vedder was a close friend of Irish musician Glen Hansard, collaborating and touring with him several times, and performed at Hansard's funeral.

While surfing with Tim Finn in New Zealand on March 25, 1995, Vedder was carried 250 feet (76 m) off the coast and had to be rescued by lifeguards. He has also paddled outrigger canoes on occasion and in 2005 was nearly lost at sea trying to paddle from Molokaʻi to Oʻahu.

Vedder has written songs and lyrics that question religious authority.

Vedder is a Chicago Bulls and Chicago Bears fan and a long-time, die-hard fan of the Chicago Cubs. In November 1993, Vedder and White Sox pitcher Jack McDowell were involved in a barroom brawl in New Orleans, Louisiana, that resulted in Vedder being arrested for public drunkenness and disturbing the peace. Vedder sang the national anthem before the third game of the 1998 NBA Finals in Chicago, and has sung "Take Me Out to the Ball Game" at six Cubs games, including Game 5 of the 2016 World Series. In 2007, a few days before performing with Pearl Jam in Chicago for Lollapalooza, he threw out the first pitch at Wrigley Field, the home of the Cubs. Vedder wrote a song at the request of former Cubs shortstop and first baseman Ernie Banks paying tribute to the Cubs called "All the Way". The day after the Cubs won the 2016 World Series, the Cubs' official Twitter account posted a montage video backed by Vedder's song in a tribute to Cubs fans.

The annual baseball series between the Seattle Mariners and San Diego Padres is often nicknamed the Vedder Cup due to both cities being hometowns of the singer. The partnership with Vedder became official in 2025, when Vedder designed a trophy to be given to the winner of the series, while the two teams agreed to support Vedder's charity, the EB Research Partnership, in return.

Vedder is an admirer of the American science fiction author Kurt Vonnegut. During an interview with Uncut, he stated that the novel Cat's Cradle is his favorite book.

== Discography ==
=== Solo discography ===
Year	Album details	Peak chart positions										Certifications
Year	Album details	US	AUS	FRA	GER	ITA	NLD	NZL	SPA	SWI	UK	Certifications
2007	Into the Wild: Released: September 18, 2007; Label: J; Format: CD, LP	11	39	31	68	6	30	34	89	28	183	BPI: Gold
2011	Ukulele Songs: Released: May 31, 2011; Label: Monkeywrench; Format: CD, LP	4	6	64	18	6	13	32	23	5	49	
2021	Flag Day (Original Soundtrack) with Glen Hansard and Cat Power: Released: August 20, 2021; Label: Seattle Surf, Republic; Format: CD, LP, digital download	—	—	—	—	—	—	—	—	—	—	
2022	Earthling: Released: February 11, 2022; Label: Seattle Surf, Republic; Format: CD, LP, digital download	29	8	149	6	10	5	—	37	3	36	
"—" denotes a release that did not chart.

=== Extended plays ===
Year	Title
2020	Matter of Time EP

=== Singles ===
Title	Year	Peak chart positions						Album
Title	Year	US	US Adult	US AAA	US Alt.	US Main.	CAN	Album
"You've Got to Hide Your Love Away"	2001	—	28	5	30	40	—	I Am Sam soundtrack
"Hard Sun"	2007	—	—	4	13	—	23	Into the Wild soundtrack
"All the Way"	2008	—	—	—	—	—	—	Non-album singles
"My City of Ruins" (live from the Kennedy Center Honors)	2010	92	—	—	—	—	46	Non-album singles
"Better Days"	2010	—	—	—	—	—	—	Eat Pray Love soundtrack
"Longing to Belong"	2011	—	—	4	—	—	—	Ukulele Songs
"Can't Keep"	2011	—	—	—	—	—	—	Ukulele Songs
"Without You"	2011	—	—	—	—	—	—	Ukulele Songs
"Cartography"	2020	—	—	—	—	—	—	Non-album singles
"Matter of Time"/"Say Hi"	2020	—	—	—	—	—	—	Non-album singles
"Long Way"	2021	—	—	7	-	—	—	Earthling
"The Haves"	2021	—	—	—	—	—	—	Earthling
"Brother the Cloud"	2022	—	—	7	38	16	—	Earthling
"Invincible"	2022	—	—	—	—	—	—	Earthling
"Save It For Later"	2024	—	—	—	29	—	—	Non-album single
"—" denotes a single that did not chart or was not released in that territory.

=== Music videos ===
- "Hard Sun" (2007)
- "Guaranteed" (2008)
- "No More" (2008)
- "Better Days" (2010)
- "You're True" (2011)
- "Longing to Belong" (2011)
- "Can't Keep" (2011)
- "Sleeping by Myself" (2012)
- "Matter of Time" (2020)
- "Say Hi" (2020)
- "Long Way" (2021)
- "The Haves" (2021)
- "Brother the Cloud" (2022)

=== Studio contributions and collaborations ===
Year	Track(s)	Title	Label
1996	"Face of Love" and "Long Road" (with Nusrat Fateh Ali Khan)	Dead Man Walking: Music from and Inspired By the Motion Picture	Sony
1997	"Hymn" (with Hovercraft)	Kerouac – kicks joy darkness	Rykodisc
1999	"Croon Spoon" (with Susan Sarandon)	Cradle Will Rock: Music from the Motion Picture Soundtrack	RCA
2000	"Poor Girl" (with the Supersuckers)	Free the West Memphis 3	Koch
2002	"You've Got to Hide Your Love Away"	I Am Sam: Music from and Inspired By the Motion Picture	V2 Ada
2003	"I Believe in Miracles" and "Daytime Dilemma (Dangers of Love)" (with Zeke)	We're a Happy Family: A Tribute to Ramones	Columbia
2004	"Lucky Country" (with Red Whyte)	The 5th Symphony Document: Soundtrack	Folklore
2005	"Long Road", "Love Boat Captain" and "Better Man" (with the Walmer High School Choir)	The Molo Sessions	Ten Club
2006	"Goodbye"	A Brokedown Melody: Music from and Inspired By the Film	Brushfire
2007	"All Along the Watchtower" (with the Million Dollar Bashers)	I'm Not There: Original Soundtrack	Columbia
2010	"Better Days"	Eat Pray Love	Monkeywrench

=== Live contributions and collaborations ===
Year	Track(s)	Title	Label
1993	"Masters of War" (live) (with Mike McCready and G. E. Smith)	The 30th Anniversary Concert Celebration	Sony
1997	"Yellow Ledbetter" (live) (with Mike McCready)	Tibetan Freedom Concert	Capitol
2001	"Long Road" (live) (with Mike McCready and Neil Young)	America: A Tribute to Heroes	Interscope
2008	"No More" (live) (with Ben Harper)	Body of War: Songs that Inspired an Iraq War Veteran	Sire

=== Guest appearances ===
Year	Group	Title	Label	Track(s)
1993	Bad Religion	Recipe for Hate	Epitaph/Atlantic	"American Jesus" and Watch It Die
1995	Mike Watt	Ball-Hog or Tugboat?	Columbia	"Big Train" and "Against the 70's"
1995	Neil Young	Mirror Ball	Reprise	"Peace and Love"
1996	Fastbacks	New Mansions in Sound	Sub Pop	"Girl's Eyes"
1996	Gary Heffern	Painful Days	Y-records	"Passin' Thru'"
1996	Crowded House	Recurring Dream	Capitol	"Everything Is Good for You"
1997	Ramones	We're Outta Here!	MCA	"Any Way You Want It"
1999	Pete Townshend	Pete Townshend Live: A Benefit for Maryville Academy	Intersound	"Magic Bus" (live) and "Heart to Hang Onto" (live)
2001	Wellwater Conspiracy	The Scroll and Its Combinations	TVT	"Felicity's Surprise"
2002	Neil Finn	7 Worlds Collide	Nettwerk	"Take a Walk" (live), "Stuff and Nonsense" (live), "I See Red" (live), and "Parting Ways" (live)
2003	Cat Power	You Are Free	Matador	"Good Woman" and "Evolution"
2003	The Who	The Who Live at the Royal Albert Hall	Steamhammer US	"I'm One" (live), "Gettin' in Tune" (live), "Let's See Action" (live), and "See Me, Feel Me" (live) (with Bryan Adams)
2004	Pete Townshend	Magic Bus – Live from Chicago	Compendia	"Magic Bus" (live) and "Heart to Hang Onto" (live)
2004	Jack Irons	Attention Dimension	Breaching Whale	"Shine On You Crazy Diamond"
2006	The Strokes featuring Eddie Vedder and Josh Homme	"You Only Live Once"	RCA	"Mercy Mercy Me (Ecology)"
2007	Crowded House	Seattle, WA January 9, 2007	Kufala	"World Where You Live" and "Something So Strong"
2008	John Doe	The Golden State	Independent	"The Golden State Remix" (with Corin Tucker)
2008	Crowded House	Surf Aid – The Music	Loop	"World Where You Live"
2011	R.E.M.	Collapse into Now	Warner Bros.	"It Happened Today"
2012	Jimmy Fallon	Blow Your Pants Off	Warner Bros.	"Balls in Your Mouth"
2013	Neil Finn	Crucible - The Songs of Hunters and Collectors	Liberation Music	"Throw Your Arms Around Me"
2013	Glen Hansard	Drive All Night	Epitaph	"Drive All Night" (with Jake Clemons)

=== Temple of the Dog discography ===
Year	Title	Label	Track(s)
1991	Temple of the Dog	A&M	"Hunger Strike", "Wooden Jesus", "Pushin Forward Back", "Your Saviour", and "Four Walled World"

== Filmography ==
=== Television ===
Performer and actor

Year	Title	Role	Notes	Original air date
1992	The Late Show	performer*	song: "Alive" (season 4, episode 2)	February 4, 1992
1992	Saturday Night Live	performer*	songs: "Alive" and "Porch" ("Sharon Stone/Pearl Jam"; season 17, episode 17)	April 11, 1992
1992	MTV Unplugged: Pearl Jam	performer*	(season 3, episode 4)	May 13, 1992
1992	MTV Video Music Awards	performer*	song: "Jeremy"	September 9, 1992
1993	MTV Video Music Awards	performer**	songs: "Animal" and "Rockin' in the Free World" with Neil Young	September 2, 1993
1993	Bob Dylan: 30th Anniversary Concert Celebration	performer	songs: "Masters of War" with Mike McCready and "Knockin' on Heaven's Door" with entire ensemble (tribute concert for Bob Dylan)	October 16, 1993
1994	24 Hours in Rock and Roll	himself	MTV documentary about one day in the life of rock and roll	March 13, 1994
1994	Headbangers Ball	himself	"Kurt Cobain Tribute Special" (season 8, episode 3)	April ?, 1994
1994	Saturday Night Live	performer*	songs: "Not for You", "Rearviewmirror" and "Daughter" ("Emilio Estevez/Pearl Jam"; season 19, episode 18)	April 16, 1994
1996	Late Show with David Letterman	performer	song: chorus to "Black" with Paul Shaffer & the CBS Orchestra	February 27, 1996
1996	38th Grammy Awards	himself	Pearl Jam won Best Hard Rock Performance for the song, "Spin the Black Circle"^	February 28, 1996
1996	Late Show with David Letterman	performer*	songs: "Hail, Hail" and "Leaving Here"	September 20, 1996
1998	Late Show with David Letterman	performer*	song: "Wishlist"	May 1, 1998
1998	Late Show with David Letterman	himself	Behind the Music parody about Paul Shaffer	May 21, 1998
1999	Late Show with David Letterman	performer	songs: "Heart to Hang Onto" and "Magic Bus" with Pete Townshend	July 28, 1999
2000	Late Show with David Letterman	performer*	song: "Grievance"	April 12, 2000
2001	America: A Tribute to Heroes	performer	songs: "Long Road" with Mike McCready & Neil Young and "America the Beautiful" with Willie Nelson, et al. (benefit concert for the victims of the September 11 attacks)	September 21, 2001
2002	Late Show with David Letterman	performer*	song: "I Am Mine"	November 14, 2002
2002	Late Show with David Letterman	performer*	song: "Save You"	November 15, 2002
2004	Late Show with David Letterman	performer*	song: "Masters of War"	September 30, 2004
2004	National Anthem: Inside the Vote for Change Concert Tour	performer*	Vote for Change finale concert and tour documentary	October 11, 2004
2006	Saturday Night Live	performer*	song: "World Wide Suicide" and "Severed Hand" ("Lindsay Lohan/Pearl Jam"; season 31, episode 16)	April 15, 2006
2006	Late Show with David Letterman	performer*	song: "Life Wasted"	May 4, 2006
2006	Later with Jools Holland	performer*	songs: "Severed Hand", "World Wide Suicide" & "Alive" (season 27, episode 1)	May 5, 2006
2006	VH1 Storytellers: Pearl Jam	performer*	(season 9, episode 1)	July 1, 2006
2006	Iconoclasts	himself	"Eddie Vedder & Laird Hamilton" (season 2, episode 1)	October 26, 2006
2008	VH1 Rock Honors: The Who	performer*	songs: "Love, Reign o'er Me" and "The Real Me" (tribute ceremony for the Who)	July 17, 2008
2009	Pearl Jam: Ten Revisited	himself	VH1 Classic documentary about Pearl Jam's debut album, Ten	March 22, 2009
2009	The Tonight Show with Conan O'Brien	performer	song: "Got Some"	June 1, 2009
2009	The Kennedy Center Honors: A Celebration of the Performing Arts	performer	song: "My City of Ruins" with gospel choir (tribute ceremony for Bruce Springsteen)	December 29, 2009
2010	Saturday Night Live	performer*	songs: "Just Breathe" & "Unthought Known" ("Jude Law/Pearl Jam"; season 35, episode 17)	March 13, 2010
2011	True Crime with Aphrodite Jones	himself	"West Memphis Three" (season 2, episode 6)	May 5, 2011
2011	Late Show with David Letterman	performer	song: "Without You"	June 20, 2011
2011	Late Night with Jimmy Fallon	performer	song: "Balls in Your Mouth" with Jimmy Fallon and the Roots	September 8, 2011
2012	Portlandia	himself	"One Moore Episode" (season 2, episode 2)	January 13, 2012
2012	Change Begins Within	performer	songs: "Rise" (solo) / "Under Pressure" with Ben Harper and Relentless7 / "It Don't Come Easy" and "Boys" with Ben Harper and Relentless7 & Ringo Starr / "Yellow Submarine" with Ben Harper and Relentless7, Ringo Starr & Sheryl Crow (benefit concert founded by David Lynch for the promotion of Transcendental Meditation)	April 29, 2012
2013	Late Night with Jimmy Fallon	performer	song: "Sirens"	October 24, 2013
2013	Late Night with Jimmy Fallon	performer	song: "Lightning Bolt"	October 25, 2013
2015	Late Show with David Letterman	performer	song: "Better Man"	May 18, 2015
2015	The Late Show with Stephen Colbert	performer	song: "Mind Your Manners" & "Rockin' in the Free World"	September 23, 2015
2016	Beat Bugs	Jasper the Grasshopper	sings eponymous "Magical Mystery Tour"	
2017	Twin Peaks	Edward Louis Severson III	song: "Out of Sand" (season 3, episode 16)	August 27, 2017

=== Film ===
Performer and actor

Year	Title	Role	Notes
1992	Singles	himself – Citizen Dick drummer (uncredited)	acting debut
1996	Hype!	himself	documentary about the popularity of the grunge movement
1997	We're Outta Here!	performer	song: "Any Way You Want It" with the Ramones (documentary and concert film of the Ramones)
1998	Not in Our Name: Dead Man Walking - The Concert	performer	songs: "Face of Love" and "Long Road" with Nusrat Fateh Ali Khan (benefit concert film for the Murder Victims Families for Reconciliation)
1998	Pearl Jam: Single Video Theory	himself	documentary about the making of Pearl Jam's Yield album
2000	The Who & Special Guests: Live at the Royal Albert Hall	performer	songs: "I'm One" & "Let's See Action" with the Who^^ and "See Me, Feel Me"/"Listening to You" with Bryan Adams & the Who (concert film of the Who with musical guests at the Royal Albert Hall)
2001	7 Worlds Collide: Neil Finn & Friends Live at the St. James	performer	songs: "Take a Walk", "Stuff and Nonsense", "I See Red" & "Parting Ways" with 7 Worlds Collide (concert film of 7 Worlds Collide in Auckland, New Zealand)
2001	Pearl Jam: Touring Band 2000	performer*	concert film of Pearl Jam's Binaural Tour
2001	Last Party 2000	himself	documentary about the last six months of the 2000 presidential election
2003	End of the Century: The Story of the Ramones	himself	documentary about the Ramones
2003	Brian Wilson: On Tour	performer	concert film of Brian Wilson with musical guests
2003	Pearl Jam: Live at the Showbox	performer*	concert film of Pearl Jam's Showbox Theatre show
2003	Pearl Jam: Live at the Garden	performer*	concert film of Pearl Jam's Madison Square Garden show
2004	Ramones: Raw	himself (deleted scenes)	documentary about the Ramones
2006	Too Tough to Die: A Tribute to Johnny Ramone	performer	songs: "I Believe in Miracles" & "Sheena Is a Punk Rocker" (tribute/benefit concert film for Johnny Ramone and cancer research)
2007	Amazing Journey: The Story of The Who	himself	documentary about the Who
2007	Pearl Jam: Immagine in Cornice – Live in Italy 2006	performer*	concert film of Pearl Jam's Italian leg of their 2006 World Tour
2007	Slacker Uprising	himself	footage from Michael Moore's 60-city college campus tour
2007	Walk Hard: The Dewey Cox Story	himself	
2008	Song Sung Blue	himself	documentary about Mike Sardina and Claire Sardina (Neil Diamond and Patsy Cline impersonators)
2008	Into the Wild: The Experience	himself	documentary short film about the making of Into the Wild
2008	Into the Wild: The Story, the Characters	himself	documentary short film about the making of Into the Wild
2009	Kôkua 2008: 5 Years of Change	performer	song: "Constellations" with Jack Johnson & Kawika Kahiapo (concert film of the Kôkua Festival)
2009	Rock and Roll Hall of Fame Live: Whole Lotta Shakin'	himself	collection of some of the best speeches, performances and backstage moments of the annual Rock and Roll Hall of Fame ceremonies
2009	Rock and Roll Hall of Fame Live: Come Together	himself	collection of some of the best speeches, performances and backstage moments of the annual Rock and Roll Hall of Fame ceremonies
2009	The People Speak	performer	song: "Masters of War" (documentary about America's struggles with war, class, race and women's rights)
2011	Conan O'Brien Can't Stop	himself	Conan O'Brien's comedy tour footage and documentary
2011	Water on the Road	performer	concert film of Vedder's Ukulele Songs tour
2011	Off the Boulevard	himself	documentary about the journey and struggle of seven different artists
2011	Pearl Jam Twenty	himself/performer*	documentary about the first twenty years of Pearl Jam
2011	Paradise Lost 3: Purgatory	himself	documentary about the West Memphis Three
2013	Cosmic Psychos: Blokes You Can Trust	himself (rumored)	documentary about the band Cosmic Psychos
2013	Jay-Z: Made in America	himself/performer*	Ron Howard documentary which follows the musical acts at the Jay-Z founded Budweiser Made in America Festival held on Labor Day weekend in Philadelphia of 2012
2017	Let's Play Two	performer*	concert documentary centering around Pearl Jam's August 2016 shows at Wrigley Field
2025	Matter of Time	himself/performer	documentary concert film about the search for a cure for epidermolysis bullosa

- *denotes performance with Pearl Jam
- **note: "Animal" performed with Pearl Jam and "Rockin' in the Free World" performed with Neil Young & Pearl Jam
- ^note: In the acceptance speech, Eddie notoriously states, "I don't know what this means, I don't think it means anything."
- ^^note: Vedder also performed the songs: "Mary Anne with the Shaky Hand" and "Getting in Tune" with the Who, but they were not released on the DVD.

2017 Documentary, Let's Play Two featuring Eddie Vedder and Pearl Jam. Can be found on Amazon Prime and was directed by Danny Clinch. Concert documentary centering around Pearl Jam's August 2016 shows at Wrigley Field.

== Awards and nominations ==
Award	Year	Nominated work	Category	Result
Broadcast Film Critics Association Awards	2008	"Guaranteed" from Into the Wild	Best Song	Nominated
SIMA Waterman's Honorees	2007	Eddie Vedder	Environmentalist of the Year	Won
Golden Globe Awards	2008	"Guaranteed" from Into the Wild	Best Original Song	Won
Golden Globe Awards	2008	Into the Wild (with Michael Brook and Kaki King)	Best Original Score	Nominated
Grammy Awards	2008	"Guaranteed" from Into the Wild	Best Song Written for a Motion Picture, Television or Other Visual Media	Nominated
Grammy Awards	2009	"Rise"	Best Rock Vocal Performance, Solo	Nominated
mtvU Woodie Awards	2008	Eddie Vedder	The Good Woodie	Nominated
Satellite Awards	2007	"Rise" from Into the Wild	Best Original Song	Nominated
Online Film Critics Society Awards	2008	Into the Wild (with Michael Brook and Kaki King)	Best Original Score	Nominated
World Soundtrack Awards	2008	"Guaranteed" from Into the Wild	Best Original Song Written Directly for a Film	Nominated
