= Indio (musician) =

Canadian singer-songwriter

- Born: Gordon Peterson
- Origin: Toronto, Ontario, Canada
- Genres: Folk
- Years active: 1989
- Label: A&M

Indio is the stage name for Canadian singer-songwriter Gordon Peterson. He released one album, Big Harvest in 1989, which included the top 10 hit "Hard Sun".

== History ==
Gordon Peterson grew up in Dundas; a constituent community in Hamilton, Ontario, Canada.

The name Indio came to him while recording the second half of the album Big Harvest in California with Larry Klein. One afternoon, Peterson drove down to Mexico and the last town before he crossed the California/Mexico border was named Indio. At that point, Peterson decided he didn't want to use his own name on the album and decided to use Indio, explaining to media that he wasn't comfortable calling it a solo album, and felt that crediting it to a band name better represented the collaborative nature of the recording sessions.

=== Big Harvest ===
Big Harvest took two months to record. It involved several high-profile artists including Hamiltonian Bill Dillon and David Rhodes (Peter Gabriel) on guitars. Larry Klein played bass. New York singer Brenda Russell sang background vocals, as did Joni Mitchell and Karen Peris of The Innocence Mission. Other collaborators included Indian violinist L. Subramaniam.

The album appeared on the RPM 100 chart in 1989, debuting in the week of June 26, and peaking at #43 in the week of September 4.

"Hard Sun" was released as the lead-off single from the album, with a stripped-down acoustic version of the song on the record's B-side. "Hard Sun" was a top 10 hit in Canada, peaking at No. 10 in the week of September 4, 1989, and the song reached the same position on the Billboard Alternative Songs chart that same month.

In 1990, "Hard Sun" was honored by SOCAN as one of the ten most popular Canadian songs of the previous year, alongside songs by Ian Thomas, Alannah Myles, One to One, Frozen Ghost, Blue Rodeo, Bruce Cockburn, Candi, Glass Tiger and Sheriff. Indio also received a Juno Award nomination for Most Promising Group at the Juno Awards of 1990.

Peterson, who was sensitive to industry demands, walked away from the business shortly after the album's release.

In 2007, Indio issued a new song, entitled "This Way Down", to a GeoCities fansite. The song features creative, at-home-studio techniques including a unique vocal recording accompanied by an electric guitar.

=== "Hard Sun" lawsuit ===
Eddie Vedder covered the single "Hard Sun" for the 2007 Sean Penn movie Into the Wild. Peterson re-emerged into the public when he filed a lawsuit in December 2009 against Vedder, alleging infringement resulting from usage and lyric alteration of "Hard Sun" without Peterson's permission, although Universal Music, Peterson's former label, granted permission.

The suit against Vedder was dismissed, while a simultaneous suit against Universal was dropped after Universal and Peterson reached an undisclosed settlement.

== Discography ==
- 1989 – Big Harvest – A&M Records
