= Pearl Jam discography =

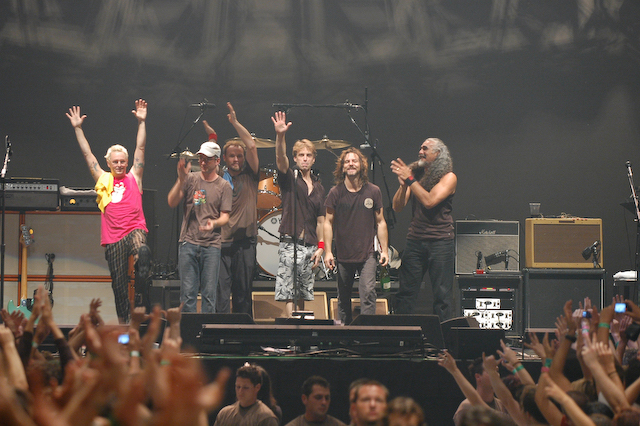
- Pearl Jam in concert in 2006
- Studio albums: 12
- Extended plays: 1
- Live albums: 23
- Compilation albums: 3
- Singles: 46
- Video albums: 7
- Music videos: 24
- Ten Club Holiday singles: 27
- Official bootlegs: 314

The discography of American alternative rock band Pearl Jam, consists of 12 studio albums, 23 live albums, 3 compilation albums, 46 singles, and numerous official bootlegs.

Pearl Jam was formed in 1990 by bassist Jeff Ament, guitarist Stone Gossard, and guitarist Mike McCready, who then recruited vocalist Eddie Vedder and drummer Dave Krusen. The band signed to Epic Records in 1991. A few months after the completion of the band's debut studio album, Ten, drummer Dave Abbruzzese joined the band. Ten broke Pearl Jam into the mainstream, and became one of the best-selling alternative albums of the 1990s. Following an intense touring schedule, the band went into the studio to record what would become its second studio album, Vs. Upon its release, Vs. set the record for most copies of an album sold in a week, and spent five weeks at the top of the U.S. Billboard 200 albums chart. Burdened by the pressures of success, Pearl Jam decided to decrease the level of promotion for its albums, including refusing to release music videos. In 1994, the band released its third studio album, Vitalogy, which became the band's third straight album to reach multi-platinum status in the U.S.

Following Abbruzzese's exit in 1994, original Red Hot Chili Peppers drummer Jack Irons joined the band. Pearl Jam subsequently released No Code in 1996 and Yield in 1998. The band once again changed drummers in 1998, with Irons being replaced by Soundgarden drummer Matt Cameron, who had previously worked with the members of Pearl Jam in the Temple of the Dog project and had drummed on the band's first demos. Cameron has remained as Pearl Jam's drummer ever since. In 1998, Pearl Jam released "Last Kiss" on the band's fan club Christmas single; however, by popular demand, the cover was released to the public as a single in 1999. "Last Kiss" became the band's highest-charting single in the U.S., peaking at number two on the Billboard Hot 100 singles chart. In 2000, Pearl Jam released its sixth studio album, Binaural, and initiated a series of "official bootlegs" of live albums. The band released 72 such live albums in 2000 and 2001, and set a record for most albums to debut in the Billboard 200 at the same time. The band's seventh studio album, 2002's Riot Act, was their last for Epic. After a one-record deal with J Records in 2006 for the distribution of their eighth studio album, Pearl Jam, the band started releasing through self-owned label Monkeywrench Records, starting with their ninth studio album, Backspacer, in 2009. Since its inception, Pearl Jam has sold 34 million albums in the U.S., including all of the band's live official bootlegs, and over 100 million copies worldwide until 2017. Pearl Jam released their eleventh studio album, Gigaton, on Monkeywrench Records/Republic Records on March 27, 2020, in the US. Internationally, the album was distributed by Universal Music Group International.

== Albums ==
=== Studio albums ===
List of albums, with selected chart positions and certifications
Title	Album details	Peak chart positions										Certifications (sales thresholds)
Title	Album details	US	AUS	AUT	CAN	GER	IRE	NLD	NOR	NZ	UK	Certifications (sales thresholds)
Ten	Released: August 27, 1991; Label: Epic; Formats: CD, CS, LP, download	2	11	31	2	15	10	10	8	3	18	RIAA: 13× Platinum; ARIA: 8× Platinum; BPI: 2× Platinum; BVMI: Gold; MC: 7× Platinum; NVPI: Platinum; RMNZ: 6× Platinum
Vs.	Released: October 11, 1993; Label: Epic; Formats: CD, CS, LP, download	1	1	7	1	8	1	1	1	1	2	RIAA: 7× Platinum; ARIA: 4× Platinum; BPI: Gold; MC: 6× Platinum; NVPI: Gold; RMNZ: Platinum
Vitalogy	Released: November 22, 1994; Label: Epic; Formats: CD, CS, LP, download	1	1	7	2	8	1	7	7	1	4	RIAA: 5× Platinum; ARIA: 4× Platinum; BPI: Gold; MC: 5× Platinum; NVPI: Gold; RMNZ: Platinum
No Code	Released: August 27, 1996; Label: Epic; Formats: CD, CS, LP, download	1	1	3	1	6	3	5	3	1	3	RIAA: Platinum; ARIA: 2× Platinum; BPI: Gold; MC: 2× Platinum; RMNZ: Platinum
Yield	Released: February 3, 1998; Label: Epic; Formats: CD, CS, LP, download	2	1	4	2	4	4	4	1	1	7	RIAA: Platinum; ARIA: Platinum; BPI: Gold; MC: 2× Platinum; NVPI: Gold; RMNZ: Platinum
Binaural	Released: May 16, 2000; Label: Epic; Formats: CD, CS, LP, download	2	1	8	2	4	6	5	2	1	5	RIAA: Gold; ARIA: Platinum; BPI: Silver; MC: Platinum; RMNZ: Gold
Riot Act	Released: November 12, 2002; Label: Epic; Formats: CD, CS, LP, download	5	1	24	4	13	9	23	3	2	34	RIAA: Gold; ARIA: Platinum; BPI: Silver; MC: Platinum; RMNZ: Gold
Pearl Jam	Released: May 2, 2006; Label: J; Formats: CD, LP, download	2	2	3	2	4	4	2	4	2	5	RIAA: Gold; ARIA: Platinum; BPI: Silver; MC: Platinum; RMNZ: Platinum
Backspacer	Released: September 20, 2009; Labels: Monkeywrench, Universal Music Group; Formats: CD, LP, download	1	1	3	1	3	2	3	4	1	9	RIAA: Gold; ARIA: Platinum; BPI: Silver; MC: Platinum; RMNZ: Gold
Lightning Bolt	Released: October 15, 2013; Labels: Monkeywrench; Formats: CD, LP, download	1	1	3	1	4	1	2	2	2	2	ARIA: Gold; BPI: Silver; MC: Platinum
Gigaton	Released: March 27, 2020; Labels: Monkeywrench; Formats: CD, LP, download	5	3	1	5	3	6	2	4	6	6	
Dark Matter	Released: April 19, 2024; Labels: Monkeywrench; Formats: CD, LP, download	5	2	2	9	2	2	2	—	3	2	
"—" denotes albums that did not chart.

=== Live albums ===
List of albums, with selected chart positions and certifications
Title	Album details	Peak chart positions										Certifications (sales thresholds)
Title	Album details	US	AUS	AUT	BEL	CAN	GER	IRE	NLD	NZ	UK	Certifications (sales thresholds)
Live on Two Legs	Released: November 24, 1998; Label: Epic; Formats: CD, CS, LP	15	4	—	42	7	49	—	37	11	68	RIAA: Platinum; ARIA: Platinum; MC: Platinum
Live at Benaroya Hall	Released: July 27, 2004; Label: BMG; Formats: 2-CD set, LP	18	27	31	38	10	100	48	25	12	76	MC: Gold
Live in NYC 12/31/92	Released: May 2, 2006; Label: Ten Club; Format: Bonus CD with fan club versions of Pearl Jam	—	—	—	—	—	—	—	—	—	—	
Live at Easy Street	Released: June 20, 2006; Label: J; Format: CD exclusive to independent record stores, LP (2019 reissue)	—	—	—	—	—	—	—	—	—	—	
Live at the Gorge 05/06	Released: June 26, 2007; Label: Rhino/Warner Music; Format: 7-CD box set	36	—	—	43	—	92	71	50	36	—	
Live at Lollapalooza 2007	Released: September 18, 2007; Label: Self-released; Format: Download exclusive to iTunes	—	—	—	—	—	—	—	—	—	—	
Live on Ten Legs	Released: January 17, 2011; Label: Universal Music; Formats: CD, LP	21	15	21	28	2	23	41	9	22	49	
9.11.2011 Toronto, Canada	Released: November 10, 2011; Label: Monkeywrench, Inc.; Formats: Download exclusive to Google Music	—	—	—	—	—	—	—	—	—	—	
Vault #1 Moore Theatre January 17, 1992	Released: September 2011; Label: Monkeywrench; Formats: CD (given to attendees of PJ20 Weekend in Alpine Valley WI)	—	—	—	—	—	—	—	—	—	—	
Vault #2 Vic Theatre Chicago August 2, 2007	Released: June 2012; Label: Monkeywrench; Formats: CD, download	—	—	—	—	—	—	—	—	—	—	
Vault #3 Constitution Hall Washington, D.C. September 19, 1998	Released: October 2013; Label: Monkeywrench; Formats: CD, download, 3LP vinyl	—	—	—	—	—	—	—	—	—	—	
Vault #4 Mount Baker Theatre Bellingham, WA May 10, 2000	Released: December 2014; Label: Monkeywrench; Formats: CD, download, 3LP vinyl	—	—	—	—	—	—	—	—	—	—	
Vault #5 Aladdin Theatre Las Vegas, NV November 30, 1993	Released: December 2015/January 2016; Label: Monkeywrench; Formats: CD, download, 2LP vinyl	—	—	—	—	—	—	—	—	—	—	
Vault #6 Great Western Forum Inglewood, CA July 13, 1998	Released: November 2016; Label: Monkeywrench; Formats: CD, download, 3LP vinyl	—	—	—	—	—	—	—	—	—	—	
Live at Third Man Records	Released: September 2016; Label: Third Man/Monkeywrench; Formats: LP vinyl	—	—	—	—	—	—	—	—	—	—	
Let's Play Two	Released: September 2017; Label: Republic; Formats: CD, download, 2LP vinyl	31	45	55	—	—	37	—	48	—	—	
Vault #7 Soldier Field Chicago, IL July 11, 1995	Released: December 2017; Label: Monkeywrench; Formats: CD, download, 3LP vinyl	—	—	—	—	—	—	—	—	—	—	
Vault #8 Adams Center Missoula, MT August 29, 2005	Released: December 2018; Label: Monkeywrench; Formats: CD, download, 3LP vinyl	—	—	—	—	—	—	—	—	—	—	
MTV Unplugged	Released: November 29, 2019 (vinyl); October 23, 2020 (CD); Label: Legacy; Formats: CD, vinyl	47	20	55	45	—	75	—	33	—	—	
Vault #9 Mercer Arena Seattle, WA December 8, 1993	Released: December 2019; Label: Monkeywrench; Formats: CD, download, 3LP vinyl	—	—	—	—	—	—	—	—	—	—	
Vault #11 Atlanta April 3, 1994	Released: December 2020; Label: Monkeywrench; Formats: CD, download, 4LP vinyl	—	—	—	—	—	—	—	—	—	—	
Vault #10 Moline, IL October 17, 2014	Released: May 2021; Label: Monkeywrench; Formats: 4LP vinyl	—	—	—	—	—	—	—	—	—	—	
Give Way	Released: April 22, 2023; Label: Epic, Legacy; Formats: CD, 2LP, download	26	56	—	—	—	—	74	22	40	78	
"—" denotes albums that did not chart.

=== Official bootlegs ===
In addition to the live albums such as Live on Two Legs, Live at Benaroya Hall, Live at the Gorge 05/06, Live on Ten Legs, Let's Play Two and myriad live versions of studio songs spread across singles as B-sides, the band has released an official bootlegs series of live recordings for each show of each tour since its 2000 European tour, with the exception of the 2004 Vote for Change tour and its 2007 European tour. The band has sold more than 3.5 million copies of shows from the launch of this series in 2000 through to their 2008 tour. For its 2000 and 2003 tours, the bootlegs consisted of double-disc (and sometimes triple-disc) albums. The bootleg series switched over to MP3 format for the band's 2005 shows and expanded to include lossless FLAC format for its 2006 tour. Official bootlegs are available for all of the band's tours since 2008 in FLAC, MP3, and CD formats.

=== Compilations ===
List of albums, with selected chart positions and certifications
Title	Album details	Peak chart positions										Certifications (sales thresholds)
Title	Album details	US	AUS	AUT	CAN	GER	IRE	NLD	NOR	NZ	UK	Certifications (sales thresholds)
Lost Dogs	Released: November 11, 2003; Label: Epic; Formats: 2-CD set, LP	15	19	70	—	64	63	75	33	18	91	RIAA: Gold; BPI: Gold; MC: Gold
Rearviewmirror (Greatest Hits 1991–2003)	Released: November 16, 2004; Label: Epic; Formats: 2-CD set, LP	15	2	66	10	11	22	32	25	3	58	RIAA: Platinum; ARIA: 5× Platinum; MC: Gold; BPI: Gold
Pearl Jam Twenty	Released: September 20, 2011; Label: Columbia; Formats: 2-CD set, LP	10	14	48	12	37	21	12	33	10	47	
"—" denotes albums that did not chart.

== Singles ==
=== 1990s ===
List of singles released in the 1990s, with selected chart positions and certifications
Single	Year	Peak chart positions										Certifications	Album
Single	Year	US	US Main	US Alt.	AUS	CAN	GER	IRE	NLD	NZ	UK	Certifications	Album
"Alive"	1991	— (Note: "Alive" did not enter the Billboard Hot 100, but peaked at number 7 on the Bubbling Under Hot 100 Singles chart.)	16	18	9	—	44	13	19	20	16	ARIA: Gold; BPI: Platinum; RMNZ: 3× Platinum	Ten
"Even Flow"	1992	— (Note: "Even Flow" did not enter the Billboard Hot 100, but peaked at number 8 on the Bubbling Under Hot 100 Singles chart.)	3	21	22	74	—	—	—	20	27	BPI: Platinum; RMNZ: 3× Platinum	Ten
"Jeremy"	1992	79	5	5	68	32	93	10	59	34	15	RIAA: Gold; BPI: Silver; RMNZ: Platinum	Ten
"Oceans"	1992	—	—	—	110	—	—	—	30	16	—		Ten
"Go"	1993	—	3	8	22	—	96	—	21	2	190 (Note: The UK CD single and vinyl single releases of "Go" were packaged with a bonus cassette single which made it ineligible to chart in the Top 100 of OCC's UK singles chart, but it did chart at number 10 on MRIB's UK singles chart.)		Vs.
"Daughter"	1993	97	1	1	18	16	—	4	46	11	18	RIAA: Platinum; MC: 2× Platinum; RMNZ: 2× Platinum	Vs.
"Animal"	1994	—	21	—	30	—	—	—	—	7	—		Vs.
"Dissident"	1994	—	3	—	—	—	97	7	14	—	14		Vs.
"Spin the Black Circle"	1994	18	16	11	3	—	92	6	21	2	10		Vitalogy
"Not for You"	1995	— (Note: "Not for You" did not enter the Billboard Hot 100, but peaked at number 2 on the Bubbling Under Hot 100 Singles chart.)	12	38	29	—	—	26	—	10	34		Vitalogy
"Immortality"	1995	— (Note: "Immortality" did not enter the Billboard Hot 100, but peaked at number 2 on the Bubbling Under Hot 100 Singles chart.)	10	31	51	62	—	—	—	29	—		Vitalogy
"I Got Id"^{[I]}	1995	7	2	3	2	78	—	29	38	17	25	RIAA: Gold	Merkin Ball
"Who You Are"	1996	31	5	1	5	4	—	19	47	17	18		No Code
"Hail, Hail"	1996	— (Note: "Hail, Hail" did not enter the Billboard Hot 100, but peaked at number 69 on the US Radio Songs chart.)	9	9	31	—	—	—	—	—	— (Note: "Hail, Hail" did not enter the UK Singles Chart, but peaked at number three on the UK Physical Singles Chart Top 100.)		No Code
"Off He Goes"	1996	—	34	31	46	36	—	—	—	—	— (Note: "Off He Goes" did not enter the UK Singles Chart, but peaked at number four on the UK Physical Singles Chart Top 100.)		No Code
"Given to Fly"	1997	21	1	3	13	24	67	18	36	12	12	ARIA: Gold; RMNZ: Gold	Yield
"Wishlist"	1998	47	6	6	48	— (Note: "Wishlist" did not enter the Billboard Canadian Hot 100, but peaked at number 7 on the Canadian Digital Song Sales chart.)	—	—	— (Note: "Wishlist" but peaked on the Dutch Tipparade Chart at number 19.)	—	30		Yield
"Last Kiss"	1999	2	5	2	1	2	—	—	77	19	42	RIAA: Gold; ARIA: 3× Platinum; RMNZ: 2× Platinum	No Boundaries: A Benefit for the Kosovar Refugees
"—" denotes a recording that did not chart or was not released in that territory.

=== 2000s ===
List of singles released in the 2000s, with selected chart positions and certifications
Single	Year	Peak chart positions										Certifications	Album
Single	Year	US	US Main	US Alt.	AUS	CAN	GER	IRE	NLD	NZ	UK	Certifications	Album
"Nothing as It Seems"	2000	49	3	10	7	— (Note: "Nothing as It Seems" did not enter the Billboard Canadian Hot 100, but peaked at number one on the Canadian Digital Song Sales chart.)	98	27	33	42	22		Binaural
"Light Years"	2000	— (Note: "Light Years" did not enter the US Billboard Hot 100, but peaked at number 42 on the Hot Singles Sales chart.)	17	26	64	— (Note: "Light Years" did not enter the Billboard Canadian Hot 100, but peaked at number 13 on the Canadian Digital Song Sales chart.)	—	—	—	—	52		Binaural
"I Am Mine"	2002	43	7	6	12	2	60	35	58	48	26	ARIA: Gold	Riot Act
"Save You"	2003	— (Note: "Save You" did not enter the US Billboard Hot 100, but peaked at number 4 on the Hot Singles Sales chart.)	23	29	—	17	—	—	—	—	— (Note: "Save You" did not enter the UK Singles Chart, but peaked at number 16 on the UK Physical Singles Chart Top 100.)		Riot Act
"Love Boat Captain"	2003	—	—	—	29	16	—	—	—	—	110		Riot Act
"Man of the Hour"	2003	—	—	—	—	—	—	—	—	—	—		Big Fish: Music from the Motion Picture
"World Wide Suicide"	2006	41	2	1	—	22 (Note: "World Wide Suicide" did not enter the Billboard Canadian Hot 100, but reached number 22 on the Nielsen BDS Canada chart.)	—	—	— (Note: "World Wide Suicide" but peaked on the Dutch Tipparade Chart at number 18.)	—	— (Note: "World Wide Suicide" did not enter the UK Singles Chart, but peaked at number 15 on the UK Physical Singles Chart Top 100.)		Pearl Jam
"Life Wasted"	2006	—	13	10	—	—	—	—	—	—	110		Pearl Jam
"Gone"	2006	—	—	40	—	—	—	—	—	—	—		Pearl Jam
"Love, Reign o'er Me"	2007	— (Note: "Love, Reign o'er Me" did not enter the Billboard Hot 100, but peaked at number 8 on the Bubbling Under Hot 100 Singles chart.)	32	—	—	—	—	—	—	—	—		Non-album single
"The Fixer"	2009	56	10	3	22	14	97	—	77	11	93		Backspacer
"Just Breathe / Got Some"	2009	78	36	6	—	30	—	—	18	—	— (Note: "Just Breathe" did not enter the UK Singles Chart, but peaked at number 19 on the UK Physical Singles Chart Top 100.)	RIAA: Platinum; RMNZ: Platinum	Backspacer
"—" denotes a recording that did not chart or was not released in that territory.

=== 2010s ===
List of singles released in the 2010s, with selected chart positions and certifications
Single	Year	Peak chart positions										Certifications	Album
Single	Year	US	US Main	US Rock	AUS	CAN	GER	IRE	NLD	NZ	UK	Certifications	Album
"Amongst the Waves"	2010	—	—	23	—	75	—	—	—	—	— (Note: "Amongst the Waves" did not enter the UK Singles Chart, but peaked at number 17 on the UK Physical Singles Chart Top 100.)		Backspacer
"Chloe Dancer/Crown of Thorns"	2011	—	—	—	—	—	—	—	—	—	—		Pearl Jam Twenty (soundtrack)
"Olé"	2011	—	—	—	—	—	—	—	—	—	—		Non-album single
"Mind Your Manners"	2013	— (Note: "Mind Your Manners" did not enter the Billboard Hot 100, but peaked at number 21 on the Bubbling Under Hot 100 Singles chart.)	2	17	54	55	—	74	69	—	—		Lightning Bolt
"Sirens"	2013	76	6	11	60	31	86	27	42	36	—	RMNZ: Gold	Lightning Bolt
"Lightning Bolt"	2014	—	6	—	—	—	—	—	—	—	—		Lightning Bolt
"State of Love and Trust / Breath"	2017	—	—	—	—	—	—	—	—	—	— (Note: "State of Love and Trust / Breath" did not enter the UK Singles Chart, but peaked at number 28 on the UK Physical Singles Chart Top 100.)		Singles: Original Motion Picture Soundtrack
"Can't Deny Me"	2018	—	11	28	—	—	—	—	—	—	—		Non-album single
"—" denotes a recording that did not chart or was not released in that territory.

=== 2020s ===
List of singles released in the 2020s, with selected chart positions and certifications
Single	Year	Peak chart positions										Album
Single	Year	US Main	US Rock	AUS DL	BEL (FL) Tip	BEL (WA) Tip	CAN DL	NLD	NZ Hot	SCO	UK Sales	Album
"Dance of the Clairvoyants"	2020	17	3	—	9	28	48	— (Note: "Dance of the Clairvoyants" did not enter the Netherlands' Single Top 100 but peaked on the Netherlands' Airplay Chart at number 37.)	16	19	24	Gigaton
"Superblood Wolfmoon"	2020	4	17	—	— (Note: "Superblood Wolfmoon" did not enter the Flanders Ultratop 50, but charted as an "extra tip" on the Ultratip chart.)	45	—	—	—	—	—	Gigaton
"Quick Escape"	2020	—	32	—	—	—	—	—	35	—	—	Gigaton
"Retrograde"	2020	—	35	—	23	40	—	—	—	—	—	Gigaton
"Get It Back"	2020	—	— (Note: "Get It Back" did not enter the Hot Rock & Alternative Songs chart, but peaked at number 25 on the Alternative Digital Song Sales Chart.)	—	—	— (Note: "Get It Back" did not enter the Wallonie Ultratop 50, but charted as an "extra tip" on the Ultratip chart.)	—	—	—	—	—	Good Music to Avert the Collapse of American Democracy, Vol. 2
"Dark Matter"	2024	1	28	31	—	—	—	— (Note: "Dark Matter" did not enter the Netherlands' Single Top 100 but peaked on the Netherlands' Tip Chart at number 10.)	21	—	36	Dark Matter
"Running"	2024	— (Note: "Running" did not enter the Mainstream Rock Airplay chart, but peaked at number five on the Hard Rock Digital Song Sales Chart.)	— (Note: "Setting Sun" did not enter the Hot Rock & Alternative Songs chart, but peaked at number 9 on the Hot Hard Rock Song Chart.)	46	—	—	—	—	33	—	—	Dark Matter
"Wreckage"	2024	1	28	—	—	—	—	—	24	—	—	Dark Matter
"Waiting for Stevie"	2024	8	— (Note: "Waiting for Stevie" did not enter the Hot Rock & Alternative Songs chart, but peaked at number 11 on the Hot Hard Rock Song Chart.)	—	—	—	—	—	—	—	—	Dark Matter
"—" denotes a recording that did not chart or was not released in that territory.

- I In the United States and Canada, the EP Merkin Ball charted as the single "I Got Id".

=== Promotional singles ===
List of singles, with selected chart positions and certifications
Single	Year	Peak chart positions										Certifications	Album
Single	Year	US Bub.	US Main	US Alt	CAN	FRA	ICE	MEX	NLD	POL	UK Phys.	Certifications	Album
"Black"	1993	—	3	20	—	—	—	—	—	—	—	BPI: Gold; RMNZ: 4× Platinum	Ten
"Dissident (Part 2)"	1994	—	—	—	—	19	—	—	2	—	—		Vs.
"Better Man"	1995	— (Note: "Better Man" did not enter the Billboard Hot 100, but peaked at number 13 on the US Radio Songs chart.)	1	2	9	—	5	—	—	—	—	RMNZ: 2× Platinum	Vitalogy
"Leaving Here"	1996	—	24	31	—	—	—	—	—	—	—		Home Alive: The Art of Self Defense
"Do the Evolution"	1998	—	40	33	50	—	—	—	—	21	—		Yield
"Elderly Woman Behind the Counter in a Small Town" (Live)	1998	—	21	26	27	—	—	—	—	—	—		Live on Two Legs
"Bu$hleaguer"	2002	—	—	—	—	—	—	—	—	—	17		Riot Act
"Brother"	2009	8	5	1	60	—	—	21	—	—	—		Ten (reissue)
"—" denotes songs that did not chart.

== Other charted songs ==
List of charting songs, with selected chart positions, showing year released and album name
Title	Year	Peak chart positions										Certifications	Album
Title	Year	US Air	US Main	US Alt.	US Rock	BEL (FL) Tip	CAN	MEX	NZ Hot	POL	UK	Certifications	Album
"Crazy Mary"	1993	—	26	8	—	—	—	—	—	1	—		Sweet Relief: A Benefit for Victoria Williams
"Elderly Woman Behind the Counter in a Small Town"	1993	—	23	17	— (Note: "Elderly Woman Behind the Counter in a Small Town" did not enter the Hot Rock & Alternative Songs chart, but peaked at number 21 on the Active Rock Chart.)	—	—	—	—	29	—	MC: Platinum; RIAA: Gold; RMNZ: Platinum	Vs.
"Glorified G"	1993	—	39	—	—	—	—	—	—	—	—		Vs.
"Yellow Ledbetter"	1994	—	21	26	—	—	—	—	—	—	—	RMNZ: 2× Platinum	"Jeremy" single
"Tremor Christ"	1994	69	16	16	—	—	67	—	—	—	—		Vitalogy
"Corduroy"	1994	50	22	13	—	—	—	—	—	—	—		Vitalogy
"Long Road"	1995	—	2	3	—	—	—	—	—	—	—		Merkin Ball
"Red Mosquito"	1995	—	37	—	—	—	—	—	—	—	—		No Code
"In Hiding"	1998	—	14	13	— (Note: "In Hiding" did not enter the Hot Rock & Alternative Songs chart, but peaked at number 16 on the Active Rock Chart.)	—	—	—	—	—	—		Yield
"Get Right"	2003	—	—	—	— (Note: "Get Right" did not enter the Hot Rock & Alternative Songs chart, but peaked at number 36 on the Heritage RockChart.)	—	—	—	—	—	—		Riot Act
"Fatal"	2003	—	—	—	—	—	—	—	—	16	—		Lost Dogs
"Gonna See My Friend"	2009	—	—	—	—	—	—	43	—	—	—		Backspacer
"Unthought Known"	2009	—	—	—	—	—	—	45	—	—	—		Backspacer
"Supersonic"	2009	—	—	—	—	—	—	39	—	—	170		Backspacer
"Getaway"	2013	—	— (Note: "Getaway" did not enter the Mainstream Rock Airplay chart, but peaked at number 22 on the Hard Rock Digital Song Sales Chart.)	—	—	45	—	—	—	—	—		Lightning Bolt
"Pendulum"	2013	—	—	—	—	—	—	—	—	1	—		Lightning Bolt
"Future Days"	2013	—	— (Note: "Future Days" did not enter the Mainstream Rock Airplay chart, but peaked at number two on the Hard Rock Digital Song Sales Chart.)	—	— (Note: "Future Days" did not enter the Hot Rock & Alternative Songs chart, but peaked at number 30 on the Rock Digital Song Sales Chart.)	—	—	—	—	—	—		Lightning Bolt
"Who Ever Said"	2020	—	—	—	34	—	—	—	37	—	—		Gigaton
"Seven O'Clock"	2020	—	—	—	45	—	—	—	—	—	—		Gigaton
"Never Destination"	2020	—	—	—	—	— (Note: "Never Destination" did not enter the Flanders Ultratop 50, but charted as an "extra tip" on the Ultratip chart.)	—	—	—	—	—		Gigaton
"Present Tense"	2020	—	— (Note: "Present Tense" did not enter the Mainstream Rock Airplay chart, but peaked at number five on the Hard Rock Digital Song Sales Chart.)	—	— (Note: "Present Tense" did not enter the Hot Rock & Alternative Songs chart, but peaked at number 16 on the Rock Digital Song Sales Chart.)	—	—	—	—	—	—		No Code
"Scared of Fear"	2024	—	—	—	— (Note: "Scared of Fear" did not enter the Hot Rock & Alternative Songs chart, but peaked at number 6 on the Hot Hard Rock Song Chart.)	—	—	—	17	—	—		Dark Matter
"React, Respond"	2024	—	—	—	— (Note: "React, Respond" did not enter the Hot Rock & Alternative Songs chart, but peaked at number 11 on the Hot Hard Rock Song Chart.)	—	—	—	—	—	—		Dark Matter
"Won't Tell"	2024	—	—	—	— (Note: "Won't Tell" did not enter the Hot Rock & Alternative Songs chart, but peaked at number 12 on the Hot Hard Rock Song Chart.)	—	—	—	27	—	—		Dark Matter
"Upper Hand"	2024	—	—	—	— (Note: "Upper Hand" did not enter the Hot Rock & Alternative Songs chart, but peaked at number 17 on the Hot Hard Rock Song Chart.)	—	—	—	—	—	—		Dark Matter
"Setting Sun"	2024	—	—	—	— (Note: "Setting Sun" did not enter the Hot Rock & Alternative Songs chart, but peaked at number 22 on the Hot Hard Rock Song Chart.)	—	—	—	—	—	—		Dark Matter
"—" denotes songs that did not chart.

== Ten Club holiday singles ==
Every year between 1991 and 2018 (with the exception of 1994), Pearl Jam rewarded members of their official fan club (Ten Club) with exclusive, vinyl singles. The singles were initially mailed out during the holiday season, however, actual holiday season delivery of subsequent singles had become somewhat hit or miss throughout the years. Packaged alongside the yearly holiday singles, "Analog" members also received a copy of the band's magazine, Deep. The majority of the tracks on the albums are either covers and/or live versions of songs, though some included previously unreleased material. There have also been many notable guest artists featured with Pearl Jam on many of the songs. The band announced on December 27, 2018, that the holiday singles would be discontinued after the 2017 and 2018 singles were released. Deep magazine continued until 2022 when it too was discontinued.

List of singles with year of release and content
Single	Year	Notes
Ten Club 1991: Let Me Sleep/Ramblings	1991	Released: December 31, 1991; A-side: "Let Me Sleep (Christmas Time)"; B-side: "Ramblings"; Recorded fall of 1991 while on tour with the Red Hot Chili Peppers; Label: Epic; Format: 7"; Limited to 1,500 copies
Ten Club 1992 (Who Killed Rudolph?): Sonic Reducer/Ramblings Continued	1992	Released: December 31, 1992; A-side: "Sonic Reducer" (The Dead Boys cover); B-side: "Ramblings Continued"; Label: Epic; Format: 7"; Limited to 25,000 copies
Ten Club 1993: Angel/Ramblings	1993	Released: December 31, 1993; A-side: "Angel"; B-side: "Ramblings" aka "Fuck Me in the Brain" [Live]; Recorded at the Empire Polo Fields on November 5, 1993, in Indio, California; Label: Epic; Format: 7"; Limited to 50,000 copies
Ten Club 1995: History Never Repeats/Sonic Reducer/Swallow My Pride/My Way	1995	Released: December 31, 1995; Record 1: A-side: "History Never Repeats" (Split Enz cover) Performed by Eddie Vedder with Neil Finn & Tim Finn [Live]; Recorded at Mount Smart Stadium on March 24, 1995, in Auckland, New Zealand; B-side: "Sonic Reducer (Christmas Single Reprise)" (The Dead Boys cover) Featuring Joey Ramone [Live]; Recorded at Tad Gormley Stadium on September 17, 1995, in New Orleans, Louisiana; The temperature was 106 °F and the show lasted 2.5 hours. This was the last song.; Record 2: A-side: "Swallow My Pride" Performed by Green River featuring Chuck Treece (drums) [Live]; B-side: "My Way" (Frank Sinatra cover) Performed by Eddie Vedder & Terry Presley (Elvis Presley's cousin) [Live]; Both tracks recorded at the Aladdin Theatre on November 30, 1993, in Las Vegas, Nevada; Label: Epic; Format: 7"
Ten Club 1996 (Pearl Jam Plays and Sings: Olympic Platinum): Olympic Platinum/Smile	1996	Released: December 31, 1996; A-side: "Olympic Platinum"; B-side: "Smile" [Live]; Recorded at the Palau dels Esports de Barcelona on November 21, 1996, in Barcelona, Spain; Label: Epic; Format: 7"
Ten Club 1997: Happy When I'm Crying/Live for Today	1997	Released: December 31, 1997; A-side: "Happy When I'm Crying"; B-side: "Live for Today" Performed by R.E.M.; Label: Epic; Format: 7"
Ten Club Christmas 1998: Soldier of Love/Last Kiss	1998	Released: December 31, 1998; A-side: "Soldier of Love" (Arthur Alexander cover) [Live]; Recorded at Constitution Hall on September 19, 1998, in Washington, D.C.; B-side: "Last Kiss" (Wayne Cochran & the C. C. Riders cover); Label: Epic; Format: 7"
Ten Club Christmas Single 1999: Strangest Tribe/Drifting	1999	Released: December 31, 1999; A-side: "Strangest Tribe"; B-side: "Drifting"; Label: Epic; Format: 7"
Ten Club 2000 (9 Stars Watching Over Us.): Crown of Thorns/Can't Help Falling in Love	2000	Released: December 31, 2000; A-side: "Crown of Thorns" (Mother Love Bone cover) [Live]; B-side: "Can't Help Falling in Love" (Elvis Presley cover) [Live]; Both tracks recorded at the MGM Grand Arena on October 22, 2000, in Las Vegas, Nevada (Pearl Jam's 10th Anniversary Concert); Label: Epic; Format: 7"
Ten Club 2001 (Christmas 10): Last Soldier/Indifference/Gimme Some Truth/I Just Want to Have Something to Do	2001	Released: December 31, 2001; Record 1: A-side: "Last Soldier" [Live]; B-side: "Indifference" Featuring Ben Harper [Live]; Both tracks recorded at the Shoreline Amphitheatre on October 21, 2001, in Mountain View, California (Bridge School Benefit Concert); Record 2: A-side: "Gimme Some Truth" (John Lennon cover) [Live]; Recorded at the KeyArena on October 22, 2001, in Seattle, Washington (Groundwork Benefit Concert); B-side: "I Just Wanna Have Something to Do" (Ramones cover) Performed by Jeff Ament; Label: Epic; Format: 7"
Ten Club PJ Merry Christmas 2002: Don't Believe in Christmas/Sleepness Nights	2002	Released: December 31, 2002; A-side: "Don't Believe in Christmas" (The Sonics cover) [Live]; Recorded during soundcheck at the Showbox Theatre on December 6, 2002, in Seattle, Washington (Live at the Showbox Concert); B-side: "Sleepless Nights" (The Everly Brothers cover) Performed by Eddie Vedder & Beck [Live]; Recorded at the Wiltern Theatre on February 26, 2002, in Los Angeles, California (Recording Artists' Coalition Benefit Concert); Label: Epic; Format: 7"
Ten Club PJ '03 Xmas (Come Back! It's Christmas... I Can Change, I'll Show You... I... Love...): Reach Down/I Believe in Miracles	2003	Released: December 31, 2003; A-side: "Reach Down" Performed by Temple of the Dog [Live]; B-side: "I Believe in Miracles" (Ramones cover) [Live]; Both tracks recorded at the Santa Barbara Bowl on October 28, 2003, in Santa Barbara, California (Louis Warschaw Prostate Cancer Centre Benefit Concert); Label: Epic; Format: 10"
Ten Club 2004: Someday at Christmas/Betterman	2004	Released: December 31, 2004; A-side: "Someday at Christmas" (Stevie Wonder cover); B-side: "Better Man" Performed by Eddie Vedder & the Walmer High School Choir from Port Elizabeth, South Africa; Label: 10 Club; Format: 7"
Ten Club Christmas 2005: Little Sister/Gone	2005	Released: December 31, 2005; A-side: "Little Sister" (Elvis Presley cover) Featuring Robert Plant [Live]; Recorded at the House of Blues on October 5, 2005, in Chicago, Illinois (Hurricane Katrina Benefit Concert); B-side: "Gone" [Demo]; Recorded at the Borgata Hotel (Room #1152) on September 30, 2005, in Atlantic City, New Jersey; Label: 10 Club; Format: 7"
Ten Club 2006: Love, Reign O'er Me/Rockin' in the Free World	2006	Released: December 31, 2006; A-side: "Love, Reign o'er Me" (The Who cover); B-side: "Rockin' in the Free World" (Neil Young cover) Performed by "U-Jam" (Pearl Jam with Bono & The Edge of U2) [Live]; Recorded at the Sidney Myer Music Bowl on November 17, 2006, in Melbourne, Australia (Make Poverty History Concert); Label: 10 Club; Format: 7"
Ten Club Christmas 2007: Santa God/Jingle Bells	2007	Released: December 25, 2007; A-side: "Santa God"; B-side: "Jingle Bells" Performed by Mike McCready [Instrumental]; Label: 10 Club; Format: 7"
Ten Club 2008 Annual Holiday Release: Santa Cruz/Golden State	2009	Released: May 2009; A-side: "Santa Cruz"; B-side: "Golden State" (John Doe cover) Performed by Eddie Vedder & Corin Tucker; Label: 10 Club; Format: 7"
Ten Club 2009: Turning Mist/Hawaii '78	2010	Released: June 2010; A-side: "Turning Mist"; Dedicated to Dick Friel; B-side: "Hawaii '78" (Israel Kamakawiwo'ole cover) [Live]; Dedicated to "Bruddah Iz" (Israel Kamakawiwo'ole); Recorded at the Hawaii Theatre on July 2, 2009, in Honolulu, Hawaii; Label: Monkeywrench; Format: 7"
Ten Club 2010: No Jeremy/Falling Down	2011	Released: September 2011; A-side: "No Jeremy" [Live]; B-side: "Falling Down" [Live]; Both tracks recorded at the Red Rocks Amphitheatre on June 20, 1995, in Morrison, Colorado; Label: Monkeywrench; Format: 10", Download
Ten Club Stereo 2011: Better Things/Devil Doll	2012	Released: June 2012; A-side: "Better Things" (The Kinks cover); B-side: "Devil Doll" Performed by X & Eddie Vedder [Live]; Recorded during soundcheck at the Estádio Vila Capanema on November 9, 2011, in Curitiba, Brazil; Label: Monkeywrench; Format: 7", Download
2012 Annual 10 Club Single – Live from Alpine Valley 2011: All Night/In the Moonlight	2013	Released: March 2013; A-side: "All Night" Featuring Joseph Arthur, Liam Finn & Glen Hansard [Live]; B-side: "In the Moonlight" Featuring Josh Homme [Live]; Recorded at the Alpine Valley Music Theatre on September 3 ("In the Moonlight") and 4 ("All Night"), 2011 in East Troy, Wisconsin; Label: Monkeywrench; Format: 7", Download
Ten Club Holiday Single 2013: 99 Problems/Shattered	2013	Released: December 20, 2013; A-side: "99 Problems" Performed by Pearl Jam & Jay-Z [Live]; Recorded at the Benjamin Franklin Parkway on September 2, 2012, in Philadelphia, Pennsylvania (Budweiser Made in America Festival); B-side: "Shattered" (The Rolling Stones cover) Performed by Eddie Vedder & Jeanne Tripplehorn [Live]; Recorded at a "Heal EB" (Epidermolysis Bullosa) benefit concert on September 22, 2013, in Malibu, California; Jeanne Tripplehorn performs the song while impersonating Julie Andrews; Label: Monkeywrench; Format: 7", Download
Ten Club 2014: Imagine/Pendulumorphosis	2015	Released: February 2, 2015; A-side: "Imagine" (John Lennon cover) Performed by Eddie Vedder [Live]; Recorded at the Super Bock Super Rock Festival on July 18, 2014, in Lisbon, Portugal; B-side: "Pendulumorphosis" Performed by Jeff Ament [Instrumental]; The song is a Pendulum instrumental used as an intro to several of Pearl Jam's shows. It features Jeff on piano, keyboards, and strings.; Label: Monkeywrench; Format: 7", Download
Ten Club 2015: Wishing Well/Redemption Song	2016	Released: May 2, 2016; A-side: "Wishing Well" (Free cover); Recorded in 1991 during the Ten sessions; B-side: "Redemption Song" (Bob Marley cover) Performed by Eddie Vedder & Beyoncé [Live]; Recorded at Central Park's Great Lawn on September 26, 2015, in New York City, New York (Global Citizen Festival); Label: Monkeywrench; Format: 7", Download
Ten Club 2016: Alive/Around and Around	2017	Released: December 24, 2017; A-side: "Alive" Featuring Dave Krusen (drums) [Live]; Recorded during soundcheck for the Rock and Roll Hall of Fame induction ceremony on April 7, 2017, in Cleveland, Ohio; B-side: "Around and Around" (Chuck Berry cover) [Live]; Recorded during a rehearsal session for the Rock and Roll Hall of Fame induction ceremony on March 30, 2017 in Cleveland, Ohio; Label: Monkeywrench; Format: 7", Download
2017 Annual Ten Club Single: Wildflowers/Keep Me in Your Heart	2020	Released: April 10, 2020; A-side: "Wildflowers" (Tom Petty cover) Performed by Eddie Vedder [Live]; Recorded during soundcheck of a 2017 solo European show; B-side: "Keep Me in Your Heart" (Warren Zevon cover) Performed by Eddie Vedder, Paul Schaffer & The Choir [Live]; Recorded during the Kennedy Center's presentation of the Mark Twain Prize for American Humor to David Letterman on October 22, 2017, in Washington, D.C.; Label: Monkeywrench; Format: 7", Download
2018 Annual Ten Club Single: Hunted Down/Missing	2020	Released: April 10, 2020; A-side: "Hunted Down" (Soundgarden cover); B-side: "Missing" (Chris Cornell cover) [Live]; Recorded at Safeco Field on August 10, 2018, in Seattle, Washington; The album is dedicated to Chris Cornell; Label: Monkeywrench; Format: 7", Download

== Videos ==
List of video releases, with selected chart positions and certifications
Title	Video details	US peak chart position	Certifications
Single Video Theory	Released: August 4, 1998; Label: Epic; Formats: VHS, DVD	2	RIAA: Platinum; MC: Platinum
Touring Band 2000	Released: May 1, 2001; Label: Epic; Formats: VHS, DVD	1	RIAA: Platinum; ARIA: 3× Platinum; BPI: Gold
Live at the Showbox	Released: May 7, 2003; Label: Ten Club; Format: DVD exclusively through pearljam.com	—	
Live at the Garden	Released: November 11, 2003; Label: Epic; Format: 2-disc DVD	2	RIAA: 3× Platinum; ARIA: 4× Platinum; BPI: Gold; MC: 2× Platinum
Immagine in Cornice	Released: September 25, 2007; Label: Rhino/WEA; Format: DVD	1	RIAA: Gold; ARIA: Gold
Pearl Jam Twenty	Released: October 25, 2011; Label: Vinyl Films/Monkeywrench; Formats: DVD, deluxe edition 3-disc DVD, Blu-ray	1	RIAA: Platinum; ARIA: Platinum
Let's Play Two	Released: November 17, 2017; Label: Republic; Formats: DVD, Blu-ray		

== Music videos ==
List of music videos, with year of release and video title
Song	Year	Director(s)
"Alive"	1991	Josh Taft
"Even Flow" (Alternate version)^{[I]}	1991	Rocky Schenck
"Even Flow"	1992	Josh Taft
"Jeremy" (Alternate version)^{[I]}	1992	Chris Cuffaro
"Jeremy"	1992	Mark Pellington
"Oceans"	1992	Josh Taft
"Do the Evolution"	1998	Todd McFarlane, Kevin Altieri
"I Am Mine"	2002	James Frost
"Save You"	2002	James Frost
"Love Boat Captain"	2002	James Frost
"Thumbing My Way"	2002	James Frost
"½ Full"	2002	James Frost
"You Are"^{[I]}	2002	James Frost
"World Wide Suicide"	2006	Danny Clinch
"Life Wasted"	2006	Fernando Apodaca
"The Fixer" (Live)	2009	Cameron Crowe
"Just Breathe" (Live)	2009	Gary Menotti
"Amongst the Waves" (Live)	2010	Ryan Thomas, Brendan Canty
"Mind Your Manners"	2013	Danny Clinch
"Sirens"	2013	Danny Clinch
"Dance of the Clairvoyants (Mach I)"	2020	Joel Edwards
"Dance of the Clairvoyants (Mach II)"	2020	Ryan Cory
"Dance of the Clairvoyants (Mach III)"	2020	Ryan Cory
"Superblood Wolfmoon"	2020	Keith Ross
"Retrograde"	2020	Josh Wakely
"Quick Escape"	2022	Samuel Bayer
"Low Light"	2023	Matt Luttrel
"Wreckage" (Live)	2024	Unknown
"Dark Matter" (SeaLegacy Version)	2024	Unknown
"Future Days"	2025	Paul Ribera

- I Unreleased.

== Other appearances ==
List of compilation appearances, with year of release, album title and song title
Year	Song	Album	Label
1992	"Alive" (live)	Stanley, Son of Theodore: Yet Another Alternative Music Sampler	Epic/Columbia
1992	"Breath" "State of Love and Trust"	Singles: Original Motion Picture Soundtrack	Epic
1993	"Crazy Mary" (with Victoria Williams)	Sweet Relief: A Benefit for Victoria Williams	Thirsty Ear/Chaos
1993	"Real Thing" (with Cypress Hill)	Judgment Night: Music from the Motion Picture	Epic
1995	"Catholic Boy" (with Jim Carroll and Chris Friel)	The Basketball Diaries: Original Motion Picture Soundtrack	Island
1996	"Leaving Here"	Home Alive: The Art of Self Defense	Epic
1996	"Gremmie Out of Control"	M.O.M., Vol. 1: Music for Our Mother Ocean	Interscope
1996	"Not for You" (live from Self-Pollution Radio)	Hype!: The Motion Picture Soundtrack	Sub Pop
1997	"Nothingman" (live)	The Bridge School Concerts, Vol. 1	Reprise
1997	"Yellow Ledbetter" (live)	Tibetan Freedom Concert	Capitol
1998	"Hard to Imagine"	Chicago Cab: Soundtrack	Loosegroove
1999	"Last Kiss" "Soldier of Love (Lay Down Your Arms)"	No Boundaries: A Benefit for the Kosovar Refugees	Epic
1999	"Whale Song"	M.O.M., Vol. 3: Music for Our Mother Ocean	Hollywood
2000	"Even Flow" (live)	Wild and Wooly: The Northwest Rock Collection	Sub Pop
2001	"The Kids Are Alright" (live)	Substitute: Songs from the Who	Edel America
2003	"Man of the Hour"	Big Fish: Music from the Motion Picture	Sony
2004	"Bu$hleaguer" (live)	Hot Stove, Cool Music, Vol. 1	Fenway
2004	"Masters of War" (live)	Songs and Artists That Inspired Fahrenheit 9/11	Epic/Sony Music Soundtrax
2004	"Better Man" (live)	For the Lady	Rhino/WEA
2004	"Go"	Riding Giants: Music from the Motion Picture	Milan
2006	"Better Man" (live)	The Bridge School Collection, Vol.1	Bridge School
2008	"Big Wave"	Surf's Up: Music from the Motion Picture	Columbia
2008	"Masters of War" (live)	Body of War: Songs that Inspired an Iraq War Veteran	Sire
2011	"Better Man" (live)	The Bridge School Concerts 25th Anniversary Edition	Reprise
2017	"Again Today"	Cover Stories: Brandi Carlile Celebrates 10 Years of The Story – An Album to Benefit War Child	Legacy
