= Can't Deny Me =

2018 single by Pearl Jam

Single by Pearl Jam
- Released: March 10, 2018
- Recorded: February 2018, Seattle
- Length: 2:44
- Label: Monkeywrench
- Composer: Mike McCready
- Lyricist: Eddie Vedder
- Producer: Brendan O'Brien

Pearl Jam singles chronology
"Lightning Bolt" (2014)	"Can't Deny Me" (2018)	"Dance of the Clairvoyants" (2020)

"Can't Deny Me" is a song by the American alternative rock band Pearl Jam. The song was released on March 10, 2018, as a digital download exclusively on Pearl Jam's Ten Club fan club, and was released as a single via streaming and digital download on March 12, 2018. "Can't Deny Me" peaked at No. 11 on Billboard's Mainstream Rock chart. Originally announced as a track from the band's then-untitled forthcoming album, the song was left off Gigaton (2020).

== Release ==
Pearl Jam posted a 25-second preview of "Can't Deny Me" on Twitter on March 10, 2018. The song was released as a surprise download to Pearl Jam's Ten Club members on the same day. It was also streamed on SiriusXM's Pearl Jam Radio. On March 12, 2018, the single was made available for streaming and digital download. The song was uploaded to the band's official YouTube channel on March 14, 2018.

Bassist Jeff Ament created the single's artwork in collaboration with Pearl Jam's longtime videographer, Kevin Shuss.

== Live performances ==
Pearl Jam performed the song for the first time during their concert at Movistar Arena in Santiago, Chile on March 13, 2018. Lead singer Eddie Vedder, speaking in Spanish, dedicated the song to "the incredible students in Florida and the United States, who survived a terrible tragedy. We will all be protesting tomorrow throughout the United States," Vedder said about the nationwide school walkout in protest of gun violence that took place on March 14, 2018.

While introducing the song at Pearl Jam's concert in Amsterdam on June 13, 2018, Vedder sarcastically told the crowd that the song "has nothing to do with Donald Trump", and "I wouldn't want to waste my breath."

== Personnel ==
- Eddie Vedder – lead vocals
- Mike McCready – lead guitar
- Stone Gossard – rhythm guitar
- Jeff Ament – bass
- Matt Cameron – drums

== Chart positions ==
Chart (2018)	Peak position
Canada Rock (Billboard)	6
US Mainstream Rock (Billboard)	11
Mexico Ingles Airplay (Billboard)	35
US Hot Rock Songs (Billboard)	28
US Rock Airplay (Billboard)	15
