= Quick Escape =

2020 single by Pearl Jam

Single by Pearl Jam

from the album Gigaton
- Released: March 25, 2020
- Genre: Grunge
- Length: 4:47
- Label: Monkeywrench
- Composer: Jeff Ament
- Lyricist: Eddie Vedder
- Producers: Josh Evans; Pearl Jam

Pearl Jam singles chronology
"Superblood Wolfmoon" (2020)	"Quick Escape" (2020)	"Retrograde" (2020)

"Quick Escape" is a song by American rock band Pearl Jam. The song was released on March 25, 2020, as the third single from their eleventh studio album, Gigaton (2020).

== Charts ==
Chart (2020)	Peak position
New Zealand Hot Singles (RMNZ)	35
US Hot Rock & Alternative Songs (Billboard)	32
Canada Rock (Billboard)	50
