= Superblood Wolfmoon =

2020 single by Pearl Jam

Single by Pearl Jam

from the album Gigaton
- Released: February 18, 2020
- Genre: Garage rock
- Length: 3:49
- Label: Monkeywrench
- Composer: Eddie Vedder
- Lyricist: Eddie Vedder
- Producers: Josh Evans; Pearl Jam

Pearl Jam singles chronology
| "Dance of the Clairvoyants" (2020) | "Superblood Wolfmoon" (2020) | "Quick Escape" (2020) |

Music video
- "Superblood Wolfmoon" on YouTube

"Superblood Wolfmoon" is a song by American rock band Pearl Jam. The song was released on February 18, 2020, as the second single from their eleventh studio album, Gigaton (2020).

== Charts ==
| Chart (2020) | Peak position |
|---|---|
| Canada Rock (Billboard) | 8 |
| Czech Republic (Top 20 Modern Rock) | 6 |
| US Hot Rock & Alternative Songs (Billboard) | 17 |
| US Rock & Alternative Airplay (Billboard) | 18 |
| US Mainstream Rock (Billboard) | 4 |
