= Man of the Hour =

2003 song by Pearl Jam

Single by Pearl Jam

from the album Big Fish: Music from the Motion Picture
- B-side: "Man of the Hour" (demo)
- Released: November 26, 2003
- Recorded: October 2003
- Studio: Studio X, Seattle, Washington
- Genre: Alternative rock
- Length: 3:46
- Label: Self-released
- Songwriter: Eddie Vedder
- Producer: Adam Kasper

Pearl Jam singles chronology
"Love Boat Captain" (2003)	"Man of the Hour" (2003)	"World Wide Suicide" (2006)

"Man of the Hour" is a song by the American rock band Pearl Jam. Written by vocalist Eddie Vedder, "Man of the Hour" accompanies the closing credits of the 2003 film Big Fish, and is the first track on the film's soundtrack album. It was released as a single on November 26, 2003. The song was included on Pearl Jam's 2004 greatest hits album, rearviewmirror (Greatest Hits 1991–2003).

== Origin and recording ==
Director Tim Burton approached Pearl Jam in 2003 to request an original song for the soundtrack of his new film, Big Fish. After screening an early print of the film, Pearl Jam vocalist Eddie Vedder went home, wrote "Man of the Hour", and had a demo ready by the next day. It was recorded by the band four days later. Guitarist Mike McCready stated, "We were so blown away by the movie... Eddie and I were standing around talking about it afterwards and were teary-eyed. We were so emotionally charged and moved by the imagination and humanity that we felt because of the movie."

== Lyrics ==
The wistful song is a young man saying farewell to his father: "The man of the hour has taken his final bow/Goodbye for now." According to Billboard magazine, the "acoustic-tinged track is accented by wistful slide guitar work, with lyrics reflecting how the father/son bond can be rocked by what seem like insurmountable obstacles."

According to Vedder at a June 1, 2006 concert in East Rutherford, New Jersey at Continental Airlines Arena, "Come Back" from the band's 2006 album, Pearl Jam, is set with the same young man from "Man of the Hour" talking to the departed two months later.

== Release and reception ==
"Man of the Hour" was released as a single on November 26, 2003, just prior to the release of the film. The single of this song features a demo version of Vedder alone on vocals and guitar as a B-side. The single was made available for purchase through the band's official website as well as through Amazon.com. It was Pearl Jam's first release without a label, in partnership with Amazon.com.

"Man of the Hour" was nominated for the 2004 Golden Globe Award for Best Original Song, but lost to Annie Lennox's "Into the West" from The Lord of the Rings: The Return of the King. It was also nominated for a 2003 Broadcast Film Critics Association Award, and a 2004 World Soundtrack Award.

Heather Phares of Allmusic said, "Though Burton's quirky, eerie aesthetic would normally be at odds with Pearl Jam's earnestness, the two work well together here, with the song touching on the film's warmth and adding a bit of earthiness to its daydreamy nature." Barry Walters of Rolling Stone said that "the star is the film's end-titles' closer, Pearl Jam's "Man of the Hour", which captures the darkness of Big Fish's central Oedipal conflict." In the director's commentary for the DVD release of Big Fish, director Tim Burton raves about the song, calling it "beautiful" and "so right" and noting how well it "matched and mirrored" the film.

== Live performances ==
"Man of the Hour" was first performed live at the band's October 22, 2003 concert in Seattle at Benaroya Hall. Since the death of Ramones guitarist Johnny Ramone, Vedder has dedicated live performances of the song to him. Live performances of "Man of the Hour" can be found on the live album Live at Benaroya Hall, various official bootlegs, the Live at the Gorge 05/06 box set and the Eddie Vedder DVD Water on the Road. On October 27, 2013 at their show in Baltimore, the band dedicated the song to Lou Reed who had died earlier that day.

During a show in Chicago on August 22, 2016, Vedder dedicated the song to his late friend Layne Staley, lead singer of Alice in Chains. That day would have been Staley's 49th birthday; "It’s the birthday of a guy called Layne Staley tonight, and we’re thinking of him tonight too. 49 years old", Vedder told the crowd before dedicating the song to his friend.

== Track listing ==
All songs written by Eddie Vedder.

1. "Man of the Hour" – 3:46
2. "Man of the Hour" (demo) – 3:53
