= Retrograde (Pearl Jam song) =

2020 single by Pearl Jam

Single by Pearl Jam

from the album Gigaton
- Released: May 14, 2020
- Length: 5:22
- Label: Monkeywrench
- Composer: Mike McCready
- Lyricist: Eddie Vedder
- Producers: Josh Evans; Pearl Jam

Pearl Jam singles chronology
| "Quick Escape" (2020) | "Retrograde" (2020) | "Get It Back" (2020) |

"Retrograde" is a song by American rock band Pearl Jam. It was released as the fourth single from their eleventh studio album, Gigaton, on May 14, 2020. A music video featuring Swedish activist Greta Thunberg was released on the same day. The song peaked at No. 9 on Billboard's Triple A chart.

== Music video ==
The music video for "Retrograde" was released on May 14, 2020, and was directed by Emmy-winning Australian filmmaker Josh Wakely and produced by the storytelling company Grace. It focuses on spreading awareness of climate change and features a cameo by Swedish environmental activist Greta Thunberg.

The music video, a mix of animation and motion capture, begins with a lone wanderer (played by cinematographer Trent Opaloch) driving through the rain and descending upon a strip mall. Visiting a psychic, the wanderer sees the destruction of the world in a crystal ball as the seas overtake the Eiffel Tower in Paris, the Tower Bridge in London, and the Space Needle in the band's native Seattle. Fluid animation moves like an oil painting in motion as Pearl Jam's members step out of their respect tarot cards and into a march. As the water continues to rise, Thunberg appears behind the crystal ball as a clairvoyant. Thunberg could not be on set due to the COVID-19 pandemic, for that reason, Wakely utilized existing footage of Thunberg with her permission, which was then grafted onto the body of another actress to create the finished video. Wakely said that Thunberg sent him an email saying that she loved the video. The fortune teller's storefront is located in a strip mall that is filled with references to Pearl Jam's previous albums, such as Ten (1991), No Code (1996) and Lightning Bolt (2013). Around 140 tarot cards with 140 different real people were also used in the video, however, none of them met each other during the making as the animators were filming themselves.

On May 29, 2020, Pearl Jam's official YouTube channel released a video showing the making of the music video.

== Personnel ==
Pearl Jam

- Jeff Ament – bass guitar, keyboard, guitar, drum loop
- Matt Cameron – drums
- Stone Gossard – guitar, keyboard
- Mike McCready – guitar, keyboard
- Eddie Vedder – lead vocals, guitar

Additional musician

- Brendan O'Brien – keyboard

== Charts ==
| Chart (2020) | Peak position |
|---|---|
| Belgium (Ultratip Bubbling Under Flanders) | 23 |
| Belgium (Ultratip Bubbling Under Wallonia) | 40 |
| US Adult Alternative Airplay (Billboard) | 9 |
| US Rock & Alternative Airplay (Billboard) | 41 |
