= Dance of the Clairvoyants =

2020 single by Pearl Jam

Single by Pearl Jam

from the album Gigaton
- Released: January 22, 2020
- Genre: New wave; post-punk; disco
- Length: 4:26
- Label: Monkeywrench
- Composer(s): Jeff Ament; Matt Cameron; Stone Gossard; Mike McCready; Eddie Vedder
- Lyricist(s): Eddie Vedder
- Producer(s): Josh Evans; Pearl Jam

Pearl Jam singles chronology
"Can't Deny Me" (2018)	"Dance of the Clairvoyants" (2020)	"Superblood Wolfmoon" (2020)

Music video
- "Dance of the Clairvoyants" on YouTube

"Dance of the Clairvoyants" is a song by American rock band Pearl Jam. The song was released on January 22, 2020, as the lead single from their eleventh studio album, Gigaton (2020). An accompanying music video was released on the same day. The lyrics were written by Eddie Vedder and the music was written by all five members of the band.

== Background ==
The band's bassist, Jeff Ament, said of the song:

"'Dance' was a perfect storm of experimentation and real collaboration, mixing up the instrumentation and building a great song, and Ed writing some of my favorite words yet, around Matt's killer drum pattern. Did I mention Mike's insane guitar part and that Stone is playing bass on this one? We've opened some new doors creatively and that's exciting."

== Release and reception ==
A fifteen-second sample from "Dance of the Clairvoyants" was published on Pearl Jam's social media on January 21, 2020. The full song was released via streaming and download at 12:00 a.m. Eastern Time on January 22, 2020.

"Dance of the Clairvoyants" has been noted as being an evolution of the band's sound, as there is more of an electronic influence in the song than previous Pearl Jam songs.

== Music video ==
A music video titled "Dance of the Clairvoyants (Mach I)" was released on the band's official YouTube channel on January 22, 2020. It was directed by Joel Edwards, produced by Evolve Studios with footage by Filmsupply. A second music video featuring the band titled "Dance of the Clairvoyants (Mach II)" was directed by Ryan Cory and was released on January 29, 2020.

On February 7, 2020, Pearl Jam released a third video titled "Dance of the Clairvoyants (Mach III)". This video was billed by the band as their first official video in seven years.

== Personnel ==
Adapted from Pearl Jam's official YouTube channel.

- Jeff Ament – guitar, keyboards
- Matt Cameron – drums, percussion, drum programming
- Stone Gossard – guitar, bass guitar
- Mike McCready – guitar, percussion
- Eddie Vedder – lead vocals, backing vocals

== Charts ==
=== Weekly charts ===
Chart (2020)	Peak position
Belgium (Ultratip Bubbling Under Flanders)	9
Belgium (Ultratip Bubbling Under Wallonia)	28
Canada Rock (Billboard)	3
Czech Republic (Top 20 Modern Rock)	6
New Zealand Hot Singles (RMNZ)	16
Scotland (OCC)	19
US Hot Rock & Alternative Songs (Billboard)	3
US Rock & Alternative Airplay (Billboard)	8
US Mainstream Rock (Billboard)	17
US Alternative Airplay (Billboard)	15
US Adult Alternative Songs (Billboard)	2

=== Year-end charts ===
Chart (2020)	Position
US Hot Rock & Alternative Songs (Billboard)	86

== Certifications ==
Region	Certification	Certified units/sales
Brazil (Pro-Música Brasil)	Gold	20,000^{‡}
^{‡} Sales+streaming figures based on certification alone.
