= World Wide Suicide =

Pearl Jam song

Single by Pearl Jam

from the album Pearl Jam
- B-side: "Unemployable"
- Released: March 14, 2006
- Recorded: November 2004 – February 2006
- Studio: Studio X, Seattle, Washington
- Genre: Alternative rock; hard rock
- Length: 3:29
- Label: J
- Songwriter: Eddie Vedder
- Producers: Adam Kasper, Pearl Jam

Pearl Jam singles chronology
"Man of the Hour" (2003)	"World Wide Suicide" (2006)	"Life Wasted" (2006)

Music video
- "World Wide Suicide" on YouTube

Audio sample
- file; help

"World Wide Suicide" is a song by the American rock band Pearl Jam. Written by vocalist Eddie Vedder, "World Wide Suicide" was released through digital music stores on March 14, 2006 as the first single from the band's eighth studio album, Pearl Jam (2006). The song topped the Billboard Alternative Songs chart, where it spent a total of three weeks at number one.

== Composition and lyrics ==
"World Wide Suicide" was written by vocalist Eddie Vedder. The song features a raw sound closer to the band's earlier material. On the song's intensity, Vedder said, "The times ... the times kind of demand a little bit of intensity."

The lyrics for "World Wide Suicide" depict anger against the war in Iraq, and criticize the US government in a subtle manner. Vedder has said that "World Wide Suicide" was written largely about Pat Tillman.

Vedder on the song:

It's about him and a bunch of the guys who didn't get as much coverage—the guys who barely got a paragraph instead of ten pages. ... The thing about Tillman was, he got ten pages but they were all lies. His family is being blocked by our government from finding out what happened. ... Where are the leaders that are going to represent a galvanized view on what to do next? ... Democracy might have a chance at working if people educate themselves on these issues and make their opinions known.

== Release and reception ==
In late February 2006, the band made a 15-second clip of "World Wide Suicide" available on the Internet, which was then played on numerous North American radio stations. The snippet revealed a hard-rocking sound with a noted return to the dominant vocal styles of Vedder's earlier work. It was first played on US radio on March 3, 2006 on KNDD (Seattle). On March 6, 2006, "World Wide Suicide" was made available via the band's official website to download for free. It was released to radio airplay on March 7, 2006. Between then and March 12, 2006, it was played over 1900 times on modern rock stations in the United States, meaning that it was one of the fastest-growing alternative rock songs of 2006 in the US. The single was made available commercially to digital music stores on March 14, 2006 accompanied by the B-side "Unemployable", also from the new album.

It entered the Billboard Modern Rock Tracks chart at number three, making it one of the highest debuts of the last several years and becoming the band's first number one on that chart since "Who You Are" in 1996. "World Wide Suicide" was also the band's first number one single of any sort in eight years (since "Given to Fly" reached number one on the Mainstream Rock chart in 1998). "World Wide Suicide" was the most successful song from Pearl Jam on the American rock charts. The song peaked at number 41 on the Billboard Hot 100, number two on the Billboard Mainstream Rock Tracks chart, and number one on the Billboard Modern Rock Tracks chart. The song spent a total of three weeks at number one on the Modern Rock chart. Without selling any hard copies of the single or distributing CDs to radio programmers, consultants and industry contacts, "World Wide Suicide" became the first digitally delivered number one song in Canadian radio history. On the song's radio success, Vedder stated, "I don't think two or three years ago you could even get a song called "World Wide Suicide" with the word soldier in it played on the radio. The fact that it's getting played a lot, maybe that means that the ocean that is freedom of speech is still healthy enough for a fish to survive in."

Jonathan Cohen of Billboard said in his review of the song that "atop a propulsive beat and a thick, three-guitar attack, Vedder personalizes his anger that the U.S. occupation of Iraq has reached the three-year mark." He added, "Rock radio should jump on this despite the delicate subject matter." In E! Online's review of the album the song was described as one that comes "close to recreating the hard rock thrills of the band's billion-selling debut, Ten." Michael Endelman of Entertainment Weekly said in his review of the song, "It takes some big stones to put out a single as unconventional as 'World Wide Suicide' ... Not the anthem we'd hoped for, but it's got a primal punk power that gets the pulse racing. A bit." In its review of Pearl Jam, The Guardian pointed out "World Wide Suicide" and stated, "Despite being over 40, [Vedder] musters absolute conviction in writing and singing lyrics of male teenage angst."

Jon Pareles of The New York Times called the song "a bitter, furious tirade about a soldier's death and the prospect of endless war." Brian D. Schiller of Slant Magazine called the song "another perfectly serviceable single to add to their canon" and proclaimed it as one of "the band's best pure rock cuts since 'Spin the Black Circle'." Jayson Greene of Stylus said, "There is real joy in hearing [Vedder] let it rip again, howling the title of "World Wide Suicide" with relish until it breaks into a screech." Kyle Anderson of Spin said, "Despite its dark title, the single "World Wide Suicide" is a speedy, punky song played with the reckless abandon of a garage band." The song was named number 11 in Rolling Stone's "The 100 Best Songs of the Year" for 2006 and was also named number 54 in the New York Post's "206 Best Songs to Download of 2006".

== Music video ==
The music video for "World Wide Suicide" was directed by Danny Clinch. The video features footage filmed in 2005 of a 24-year-old Chilean street performer named Sebastián González contact juggling. The band met González while touring South America. The street performer portions of the video were filmed in November 2005 in the dresser rooms of the band's Chile concert location San Carlos de Apoquindo Stadium. It also features scenes filmed in 2006 of the band performing the song in its studio in Seattle, Washington. The video was released in April 2006.

== Live performances ==
On April 15, 2006, "World Wide Suicide" was premiered live on Saturday Night Live. This marked Pearl Jam's first appearance on Saturday Night Live since 1994. The song was first performed live in concert at the band's April 20, 2006 concert in London, England at the London Astoria. Pearl Jam performed the song in 2006 for Sessions@AOL. Pearl Jam performed the song for its appearance on VH1 Storytellers in 2006. Live performances of "World Wide Suicide" can be found on various official bootlegs, the Live at the Gorge 05/06 box set, and the live album Live at Lollapalooza 2007. A performance of the song mixed from various dates in Italy is also included on the DVD Immagine in Cornice.

== Track listing ==
1. "World Wide Suicide" (Eddie Vedder) – 3:29
2. "Unemployable" (Matt Cameron, Mike McCready, Vedder) – 3:04

== Personnel ==
- Eddie Vedder – vocals, guitar
- Mike McCready – lead guitar
- Stone Gossard – guitar
- Jeff Ament – bass
- Matt Cameron – drums

== Charts ==
=== Weekly charts ===
Weekly chart performance for "World Wide Suicide"
Chart (2006)	Peak Position
Canada (Nielsen BDS)	22
Canada Rock Top 30 (Radio & Records)	1
US Billboard Hot 100	41
US Alternative Airplay (Billboard)	1
US Mainstream Rock Airplay (Billboard)	2
US Pop 100 (Billboard)	47

=== Year-end charts ===
Year-end chart performance for "World Wide Suicide"
Chart (2006)	Position
US Alternative Songs (Billboard)	19
US Mainstream Rock Songs (Billboard)	25

== Accolades ==
Accolades for "World Wide Suicide"
Publication	Country	Accolade	Year	Rank
New York Post	United States	"206 Best Songs to Download of 2006"	2006	54
Rolling Stone	United States	"The 100 Best Songs of 2006"	2006	11

== See also ==
- List of anti-war songs
