= Live at Lollapalooza 2007 =

Live album by Pearl Jam
- Released: September 18, 2007
- Recorded: August 5, 2007, Grant Park, Chicago, Illinois
- Genre: Alternative rock
- Length: 107:02
- Label: Self-released

Pearl Jam live albums chronology
Live at the Gorge 05/06 (2007)	Live at Lollapalooza 2007 (2007)	Live on Ten Legs (2011)

Live at Lollapalooza 2007 is a live album by the American alternative rock band Pearl Jam that was released as an iTunes exclusive on September 18, 2007.

== Overview ==
The album contains Pearl Jam's set from the band's August 5, 2007 appearance at Lollapalooza in Chicago, Illinois. The album is available exclusively through iTunes. Proceeds from this download benefit VH1's Save the Music Foundation.

Although the album is labeled as "clean," all songs that feature cursing have been left intact. The album omits a performance of the song "No More" by vocalist Eddie Vedder and musician Ben Harper as well as a speech made by Iraq War veteran Tomas Young. The performance of "No More" was included on the Body of War soundtrack.

== Track listing ==
1. "Why Go" (Eddie Vedder, Jeff Ament) – 3:27
2. "Corduroy" (Dave Abbruzzese, Ament, Stone Gossard, Mike McCready, Vedder) – 4:29
3. "Save You" (Ament, Matt Cameron, Gossard, McCready, Vedder) – 3:24
4. "Do the Evolution" (Gossard, Vedder) – 4:25
5. "Elderly Woman Behind the Counter in a Small Town" (Abbruzzese, Ament, Gossard, McCready, Vedder) – 3:10
6. "Severed Hand" (Vedder) – 3:47
7. "Education" (Vedder) – 2:40
8. "Even Flow" (Vedder, Gossard) – 9:40
9. "Given to Fly" (McCready, Vedder) – 3:27
10. "World Wide Suicide" (Vedder) – 7:13
11. "Lukin" (Vedder) – 0:50
12. "Not for You" (Abbruzzese, Ament, Gossard, McCready, Vedder) – 5:57
13. "Daughter"/"Another Brick in the Wall (Part 2)" (Abbruzzese, Ament, Gossard, McCready, Vedder)/(Roger Waters) – 5:48
14. "State of Love and Trust" (Vedder, McCready, Ament) – 3:22
15. "Wasted Reprise" (Gossard, Vedder) – 2:36
16. "Alive" (Vedder, Gossard) – 7:58
17. "Better Man" (Vedder) – 6:04
18. "Crazy Mary" (Victoria Williams) – 9:21
19. "Life Wasted" (Gossard, Vedder) – 3:46
20. "Rearviewmirror" (Abbruzzese, Ament, Gossard, McCready, Vedder) – 6:54
21. "Rockin' in the Free World" (Neil Young) (with Ben Harper) – 8:44

== Personnel ==
Pearl Jam

- Jeff Ament – bass guitar
- Matt Cameron – drums
- Stone Gossard – guitars
- Mike McCready – guitars
- Eddie Vedder – vocals, guitars

Additional musicians

- Boom Gaspar – Hammond B3, Fender Rhodes
- Ben Harper – vocals on "Rockin' in the Free World"
