= Gigaton (album) =

2020 studio album by Pearl Jam

Studio album by Pearl Jam
- Released: March 27, 2020
- Recorded: March 2017 – September 2019
- Genre: Experimental rock; grunge; post-punk
- Length: 57:03
- Label: Monkeywrench; Republic
- Producer: Josh Evans

Pearl Jam chronology
MTV Unplugged (2019)	Gigaton (2020)	Give Way (2023)

Singles from Gigaton
- 1. "Dance of the Clairvoyants" Released: January 22, 2020; 2. "Superblood Wolfmoon" Released: February 18, 2020; 3. "Quick Escape" Released: March 25, 2020; 4. "Retrograde" Released: May 14, 2020

Gigaton is the eleventh studio album by American rock band Pearl Jam, released March 27, 2020. It was preceded by the singles "Dance of the Clairvoyants", "Superblood Wolfmoon" and "Quick Escape". It is the band's first studio album in six and half years, and their first album since 2006's eponymous album to feature more collaboration for the lyrics, rather than them being written solely by the frontman Eddie Vedder. The cover artwork was produced by photographer Paul Nicklen. Its release was scheduled to coincide with a tour of North America. However, the North American leg was postponed due to the COVID-19 pandemic and eventually rescheduled for 2022.

== Background and recording ==
Producer Josh Evans told Variety's Jonathan Cohen that "Seven O'Clock" was pieced together from different portions of a jam early in the recording sessions, and then layered with new elements later on. Eddie Vedder's vocal on the solo acoustic "Comes Then Goes" was captured on the first take, while the 1850s-era pump organ Vedder played on the 2015 demo of "River Cross" was retained for the studio version.

== Critical reception ==
Professional ratings
Aggregate scores
Source	Rating
AnyDecentMusic?	7.5/10
Metacritic	80/100
Review scores
Source	Rating
AllMusic	4/5 stars
The Guardian	4/5 stars
Consequence of Sound	B+
Entertainment Weekly	B+
Kerrang!	5/5 stars
Mojo	4/5 stars
NME	3/5 stars
Pitchfork	6.2/10
Rolling Stone	4/5 stars
Spin	4/5 stars

According to the review aggregator Metacritic, Gigaton received "generally favorable reviews" based on a weighted average score of 80 out of 100 from 26 critic scores. AllMusic critic Stephen Thomas Erlewine rated the album 4 out of 5 stars, noting that its three highlights were "Who Ever Said", "Dance of the Clairvoyants" and "Never Destination". Rolling Stone writer Kory Grow also gave the album a positive review, also rating it 4 out of 5 stars. Grow wrote that Gigaton is "an admirable, inspiring example of grown-up grunge". Spin writer John Paul Bullock was also positive toward the album, writing, "Gigaton has a little something for everyone. It's a complex, dynamic album full of earnest emotion and subtle humor". Mojo, in yet another positive review, wrote, "Strong and loose, political and personal, Pearl Jam get the balance absolutely right".

Kerrang! writer George Garner gave the album a perfect score, and wrote: "it's Pearl Jam's most incensed album since 2006. It's their most musically inventive since 1998. And, by virtue of its themes, it is their most gravely needed of their entire career. It is, in short, a triumph". Garner also noted that Gigaton "often zips along so quickly that on first listen it's easy to miss the details that make it so special".

Writing for The A.V. Club, Alex McLevy gave the album a B, criticizing it for being uneven, but praising the band for musical experimentation and writing that it "stands out in comparison to several more recent Pearl Jam albums due to the improved ratio of hits to misses on the back half". Consequence of Sound critic Matt Melis graded the album a B+, noting that the three best songs from Gigaton were "Superblood Wolfmoon", "Quick Escape" and "Retrograde".

Steve Lampiris of The Line of Best Fit considered Gigaton the band's most experimental album, and gave it a score of 8 out of 10. Tom Hull was less impressed, giving it a B grade and saying that it is "not bad, nor especially interesting, and by the end I was reminded of how tedious Eddie Vedder's voice is."

=== Accolades ===
Accolades for Gigaton
Publication	Accolade	Rank	Ref.
Mojo	Top 75 Albums of 2020	44	
Consequence of Sound	Top 50 Albums of 2020	10	
Insider	The 10 best rock albums of 2020	5	
Spin	Spin's 30 Best Albums of 2020 – Mid-Year	N/A	

== Commercial performance ==
On the US Billboard 200, Gigaton debuted at number 5 with 63,000 album-equivalent units, marking the band's twelfth top 10 album. Of that sum, it sold 14,000 vinyl copies, the second-largest weekly vinyl sales for a 2020 release.

As of March 2024 the album has earned 172,000 equivalent album units in the US.

== Track listing ==
All lyrics are written by Eddie Vedder, except where noted.

No.	Title	Lyrics	Music	Length
1.	"Who Ever Said"		Vedder	5:11
2.	"Superblood Wolfmoon"		Vedder	3:49
3.	"Dance of the Clairvoyants"		Jeff Ament, Matt Cameron, Stone Gossard, Mike McCready, Vedder	4:26
4.	"Quick Escape"		Ament	4:47
5.	"Alright"	Ament	Ament	3:44
6.	"Seven O'Clock"		Ament, Gossard, McCready, Vedder	6:14
7.	"Never Destination"		Vedder	4:17
8.	"Take the Long Way"	Cameron	Cameron	3:42
9.	"Buckle Up"	Gossard	Gossard	3:37
10.	"Comes Then Goes"		Vedder	6:02
11.	"Retrograde"		McCready	5:22
12.	"River Cross"		Vedder	5:53
Total length:				57:03

== Personnel ==
Pearl Jam

- Eddie Vedder – vocals, guitar; keyboards on "Seven O'Clock", pump organ on "River Cross", production, concept and layout (credited as Jerome Turner), text
- Mike McCready – guitar; percussion on "Dance of the Clairvoyants", keyboards on "Retrograde", production
- Stone Gossard – guitar; bass guitar on "Dance of the Clairvoyants", percussion on "Buckle Up", vocals on "Buckle Up", keyboards on "Retrograde", production
- Jeff Ament – bass guitar; keyboards and guitar on "Dance of the Clairvoyants" and "Quick Escape", drum loop on "Quick Escape", keyboards on "Alright" and "Seven O'Clock", kalimba on "Alright" and "River Cross", programming on "Seven O'Clock", piano on "Buckle Up", production, layout, concept (credited as Al Nostreet)
- Matt Cameron – drums; drum programming on "Dance of the Clairvoyants", guitar on "Alright" and "Take the Long Way", vocals and programming on "Take the Long Way", production

Additional personnel

- Ames Bros. – text
- John Burton – engineering
- Josh Evans – keyboards on "Superblood Wolfmoon", "Never Destination", "Buckle Up" and "River Cross", drum programming on "Alright", production
- Meagan Grandall – backing vocals on "Take the Long Way"
- Bob Ludwig – mastering
- Paul Nicklen – photography
- Brendan O'Brien – keyboards on "Quick Escape" and "Retrograde"
- Joe Spix – layout

== Charts ==
=== Weekly charts ===
Weekly chart performance for Gigaton
Chart (2020)	Peak position
Australian Albums (ARIA)	3
Austrian Albums (Ö3 Austria)	1
Belgian Albums (Ultratop Flanders)	4
Belgian Albums (Ultratop Wallonia)	2
Canadian Albums (Billboard)	5
Croatian International Albums (HDU)	1
Czech Albums (ČNS IFPI)	12
Danish Albums (Hitlisten)	6
Dutch Albums (Album Top 100)	2
Finnish Albums (Suomen virallinen lista)	5
French Albums (SNEP)	34
German Albums (Offizielle Top 100)	3
Greek Albums (IFPI)	1
Hungarian Albums (MAHASZ)	6
Irish Albums (Official Charts)	6
Italian Albums (FIMI)	1
Japanese Albums (Oricon)	30
New Zealand Albums (RMNZ)	6
Norwegian Albums (VG-lista)	4
Polish Albums (ZPAV)	6
Portuguese Albums (AFP)	1
Scottish Albums (Official Charts)	3
Spanish Albums (PROMUSICAE)	1
Swedish Albums (Sverigetopplistan)	10
Swiss Albums (Schweizer Hitparade)	2
UK Albums (Official Charts)	6
UK Rock & Metal Albums (Official Charts)	1
US Billboard 200	5
US Top Alternative Albums (Billboard)	1
US Top Hard Rock Albums (Billboard)	1
US Top Rock Albums (Billboard)	1

=== Year-end charts ===
Year-end chart performance for Gigaton
Chart (2020)	Position
Belgian Albums (Ultratop Flanders)	95
Belgian Albums (Ultratop Wallonia)	159
Swiss Albums (Schweizer Hitparade)	81
US Top Rock Albums (Billboard)	60
