= Life Wasted =

Single by Pearl Jam

from the album Pearl Jam
- B-side: "Come Back" (live)
- Released: August 28, 2006
- Recorded: November 2004 – February 2006
- Studio: Studio X, Seattle, Washington
- Genre: Alternative rock
- Length: 3:54
- Label: J
- Composer: Stone Gossard
- Lyricist: Eddie Vedder
- Producers: Adam Kasper, Pearl Jam

Pearl Jam singles chronology
"World Wide Suicide" (2006)	"Life Wasted" (2006)	"Gone" (2006)

Music video
- "Life Wasted" on YouTube

Audio sample
- file; help

"Life Wasted" is a song by the American rock band Pearl Jam. Featuring lyrics written by vocalist Eddie Vedder and music written by guitarist Stone Gossard, "Life Wasted" was released on August 28, 2006 as the second single from the band's eighth studio album, Pearl Jam (2006). The song peaked at number 10 on the Billboard Modern Rock Tracks chart. On Pearl Jam, "Life Wasted" is reprised as a modified version on the album's tenth track, "Wasted Reprise".

== Origin and recording ==
"Life Wasted" features lyrics written by vocalist Eddie Vedder and music written by guitarist Stone Gossard.

== Lyrics ==
The lyrics for "Life Wasted" were reportedly written about the death of the punk rock guitarist Johnny Ramone and about the feelings one has after driving home from a funeral. In an interview with Rolling Stone, Vedder stated:

When you leave that funeral, that drive is as important as any single stretch of road you'll travel on. You've got a renewed appreciation for life. And I think that feeling can last through the day, through the week, but then things start getting back to normal and you start taking this living and breathing and eating thing for granted. I think that song is there to remind you, 'This is that feeling'....The truth is—I'm a little sensitive and this is a close, personal relationship. I'll just say it. Fuck it. Right up front. Half the record is based on the loss of the guy who turned out to be the best friend I ever had on the planet. And that was Johnny Ramone.

== Release and reception ==
A 7" single for "Life Wasted" was released commercially in the UK on August 28, 2006. The B-side is "Come Back" from June 27, 2006 in Saint Paul, Minnesota at Xcel Energy Center. The single was also made available as a download from the UK iTunes Store. The song peaked at number 13 on the Billboard Mainstream Rock Tracks chart and number 10 on the Billboard Modern Rock Tracks chart.

Kyle Anderson of Spin said that "even though Eddie Vedder sings "Leave the fame to someone else" over the best riff Pete Townshend never wrote (on "Life Wasted"), he actually chuckles just before the last chorus. It's a small detail, but it's a sign that Pearl Jam are taking themselves less seriously, and it fits them like a snug flannel shirt." This is misquoted however, as the line is "leave the pain for someone else"

A cover of "Life Wasted" is featured in the 2007 video game, Guitar Hero II, for the Xbox 360.

== Music video ==
The music video for "Life Wasted" was directed by Fernando Apodaca. The video explores the song's themes of death and rebirth. The video was filmed over 10 months in locations such as Romania, Seattle, Washington, and George, Washington. The video, which emulates the liner notes from the album, was done without the aid of special effects. Apodaca created the physical sculptures for the video. Life casts were made of each of the band members' heads. Vedder sacrificed his eyelashes for the process. The busts were brought to life through the use of projection. During the video, the heads are shown being lit on fire, drenched with water, and inhabited by worms and bugs. Other sculptures in the video were made from bronze, wax, and leather. It also features footage of Vedder singing and the band performing the song.

Apodaca stated that the video portrays "the ambiguities of consumerism, obsolescence, deterioration, and growth. Within the film exists a fractured world which is both fragile and transitory, such as wax melting and bread voraciously consumed by ants. Various mythologies are revealed but not explained, opening doorways to interpretation." The video was released on May 19, 2006 to the public on Google Video under the Creative Commons Attribution-NonCommercial-NoDerivs license allowing copying, distributing and sharing. This was most likely the first time that a video produced by a major record company was released under such a license. This video marked the first time Pearl Jam had released a conceptual video since "Do the Evolution" in 1998. It was nominated for a MTV Video Music Award for Best Special Effects in 2006.

=== Accolades ===
- Best Music Video Director (Fernando Apodaca) - 2006 San Diego Film Festival

== Live performances ==
"Life Wasted" was first performed live at the band's April 20, 2006 concert in London, England at the London Astoria. The band played this song when they appeared on the Late Show with David Letterman on May 4, 2006 in support of Pearl Jam. Pearl Jam performed the song in 2006 for Sessions@AOL. Pearl Jam performed the song for its appearance on VH1 Storytellers in 2006. Since 2007, the band has played the song in the key of C major during live performances. On the album and 2006 performances, it was played in D♭major. The change of key requires the de-tuning of the guitars to a half-step down (E♭, A♭, D♭, G♭, B♭, E♭), and the use of a capo on the 3rd fret (first 5 strings only, open 6th) as opposed to the 4th fret. Live performances of "Life Wasted" can be found on various official bootlegs, the Live at the Gorge 05/06 box set, and the live album Live at Lollapalooza 2007. A performance of the song is also included on the DVD Immagine in Cornice.

== Track listing ==
1. "Life Wasted" (Stone Gossard, Eddie Vedder) – 3:54
2. "Come Back" (live) (Mike McCready, Vedder) – 5:18
  - Recorded live on June 27, 2006 at Xcel Energy Center in Saint Paul, Minnesota.

== Chart performance ==
Chart (2006)	Peak position
Canada Rock (Billboard)	8
Poland Airplay (ZPAV)	11
UK Singles (Official Charts)	110
US Alternative Airplay (Billboard)	10
US Mainstream Rock (Billboard)	13
