= Big Fish (soundtrack) =

Big Fish: Music from the Motion Picture

Soundtrack album by Various Artists and Danny Elfman
- Released: December 23, 2003
- Studios: Studio X, Seattle, Washington; AIR Studios, Lyndhurst Hall, London, England
- Genre: Film soundtrack
- Length: 1:01:13
- Label: Sony Classical
- Producer: Danny Elfman

Danny Elfman soundtracks chronology
Hulk (2003)	Big Fish: Music from the Motion Picture (2003)	Spider-Man 2 (2004)

Singles from Big Fish: Music from the Motion Picture
- 1. "Man of the Hour" Released: November 26, 2003

Professional ratings
Review scores
Source	Rating
AllMusic	3.5/5 stars
Filmtracks	4/5 stars

Big Fish: Music from the Motion Picture is the thirty-fifth soundtrack album by American music composer Danny Elfman. It was released on December 23, 2003, by Sony Classical to promote the 2003 American fantasy comedy-drama film Big Fish.

The album was nominated for the Academy Award and the Golden Globe Award for Best Original Score.

== Track listing ==
1. "Man of the Hour" – Pearl Jam (3:45)
2. "Dinah" – Bing Crosby (2:17)
3. "Everyday" – Buddy Holly (2:09)
4. "All Shook Up" – Elvis Presley (1:58)
5. "Five O'Clock World" – The Vogues (2:10)
6. "Ramblin' Man" – The Allman Brothers Band (4:57)
7. "Let's Work Together" – Canned Heat (3:13)
8. "Pictures" (0:45)
9. "Big Fish (Titles)" (4:32)
10. "Shoe Stealing" (0:54)
11. "Underwater" (1:53)
12. "Sandra's Theme" (2:22)
13. "The Growing Montage" (2:40)
14. "Leaving Spectre" (1:59)
15. "Return to Spectre" (2:12)
16. "Rebuilding" (1:18)
17. "The Journey Home" (2:10)
18. "In the Tub" (1:18)
19. "Sandra's Farewell" (1:16)
20. "Finale" (11:10)
21. "End Titles" (2:41)
22. "Jenny's Theme" (1:45)
23. "Twice the Love (Siamese Twin's Song)" – Bobbi Page and Candice Rump (1:49)
