= Gone (Pearl Jam song) =

2006 single by Pearl Jam

Single by Pearl Jam

from the album Pearl Jam
- B-side: "Come Back" (live) / "Gone" (live)
- Released: September 4, 2006
- Recorded: October 2005 – February 2006
- Studio: Studio X, Seattle, Washington
- Genre: Alternative rock
- Length: 4:09
- Label: J
- Songwriter: Eddie Vedder
- Producers: Adam Kasper, Pearl Jam

Pearl Jam singles chronology
"Life Wasted" (2006)	"Gone" (2006)	"Love, Reign o'er Me" (2007)

"Gone" is a song by the American rock band Pearl Jam. Written by vocalist Eddie Vedder, "Gone" was released to rock radio on September 4, 2006, as the third single from the band's eighth studio album, Pearl Jam (2006). It became available through digital music retailers on October 7, 2006. The song reached number 40 on the Billboard Modern Rock Tracks chart.

== Origin and recording ==
"Gone" was written by vocalist Eddie Vedder on September 30, 2005, in Room 1152 (where the band stayed that night), of the Borgata Hotel, located in Atlantic City, New Jersey. It debuted the next night in a solo performance by Vedder at the band's October 1, 2005 concert in Atlantic City, New Jersey at the Borgata Events Center. The band recorded a demo version of the song that was released as a part of the 2005 Holiday single available to fan club members. Vedder on the song:

[We were in Atlantic City and] I wanted to play a song the next night. I went to learn it and it didn't come right away, so I started playing something else, and it was ["Gone"]. What's nice about it was that it was done in an hour or so, with backgrounds. I played it the next night at the show.

== Lyrics ==
"Gone" is about leaving everything behind and moving along. The song brings into perspective perceptions that all is not lost if one chooses to incorporate change. When the song was performed on VH1 Storytellers in 2006, Vedder introduced it as "a car song." In an interview Vedder stated:

The idea was that this guy was leaving Atlantic City and needing to find a new life without his past, without his possessions, and not really looking for more possessions. Because it takes place in a car, it's probably very similar to "Rearviewmirror" in a way. But I think this car is a hybrid, because I think he's only got one tank of gas, so I want him to go far.

The line "nothing is everything" was taken from the song "Let's See Action" from the 1972 Pete Townshend solo album, Who Came First. Vedder thanks Townshend in the liner notes for the album.

== Release and reception ==
"Gone" was shipped to rock radio formats on September 4, 2006. It was later made available commercially as a download from the UK iTunes Store on October 7, 2006. The song peaked at number 40 on the Billboard Modern Rock Tracks chart.

== Live performances ==
As previously mentioned, "Gone" was first performed live at the band's October 1, 2005 concert in Atlantic City, New Jersey at the Borgata Events Center in a solo performance by Vedder. The first performance of the song with the full band took place at the band's April 20, 2006 concert in London, England at the London Astoria. Pearl Jam performed the song in 2006 for Sessions@AOL. Pearl Jam performed the song for its appearance on VH1 Storytellers in 2006. Live performances of "Gone" can be found on various official bootlegs, the "Gone" single, and the Live at the Gorge 05/06 box set.

== Track listing ==
All songs written by Eddie Vedder, except where noted:

1. "Gone" – 4:09
2. "Come Back" (live) (Mike McCready, Vedder) – 5:18
  - Recorded live on June 27, 2006 at Xcel Energy Center in Saint Paul, Minnesota.
3. "Gone" (live) – 4:01

== Chart positions ==
Chart (2006)	Position
US Modern Rock Tracks	40
