= Live at Benaroya Hall =

- Cover to the Compact Disc version of the album

Live album by Pearl Jam
- Released: July 27, 2004
- Recorded: October 22, 2003, Benaroya Hall, Seattle, Washington
- Genre: Alternative rock, acoustic rock
- Length: 129:27
- Language: English
- Label: BMG

Pearl Jam live albums chronology
Live on Two Legs (1998)	Live at Benaroya Hall (2004)	Live in NYC 12/31/92 (2006)

Vinyl LP
- Artwork for the 2004 vinyl edition

Professional ratings
Review scores
Source	Rating
Allmusic	2.5/5 stars
Q	3/5 stars
Rolling Stone	3/5 stars

Live at Benaroya Hall is a two-disc live album by the American alternative rock band Pearl Jam, recorded on October 22, 2003, at Benaroya Hall, Seattle, Washington and released on July 27, 2004, through BMG.

== Overview ==
The concert—which took place on October 22, 2003, at Benaroya Hall in Seattle, Washington—is acoustic, and was performed and released as a benefit for YouthCare, a non-profit charity in Seattle. The album was also released as a limited edition quadruple vinyl through Ten Club, Pearl Jam's fan club. Only 2,000 were pressed—each individually numbered by hand—and sold out within minutes of being on sale.

Live at Benaroya Hall was released through a one-album deal with BMG, and the band used the experiment to later sign with BMG subsidiary J Records to produce the album Pearl Jam (Avocado). It debuted at number 18 on the Billboard 200 chart and sold approximately 52,000 copies in its first week. As of April 2006, Live at Benaroya Hall has sold 168,000 copies in the United States according to Nielsen SoundScan.

== Reception ==
AllMusic staff writer Jason Birchmeier gave the album two and a half out of five stars, writing, "Of the many, many live albums Pearl Jam publicly released, their October 23, 2003, show at Benaroya Hall is one of the more novel ones... Such novelty, of course, doesn't make Benaroya Hall an especially excellent set (in fact, it feels a little one-dimensional and subdued because of the acoustic instrumentation), though it is one of the more unique and interesting of the many, many shows Pearl Jam released publicly over the years." Rolling Stone staff writer Christian Hoard gave the album three out of five stars, writing that the " album's warm, wizened feel and unusual set list are appropriate for souvenir-collecting obsessives and lapsed fans looking for a new take on Pearl Jam's substantial catalog."

== Track listing ==
Disc one

1. "Of the Girl" (Stone Gossard) – 5:22
2. "Low Light" (Jeff Ament) – 4:18
3. "Thumbing My Way" (Eddie Vedder) – 4:49
4. "Thin Air" (Gossard) – 4:25
5. "Fatal" (Gossard) – 3:49
6. "Nothing as It Seems" (Ament) – 7:29
7. "Man of the Hour" (Vedder) – 3:58
8. "Immortality" (Dave Abbruzzese, Ament, Gossard, Mike McCready, Vedder) – 6:18
9. "Off He Goes" (Vedder) – 5:53
10. "Around the Bend" (Vedder) – 5:37
11. "I Believe in Miracles" (Dee Dee Ramone, Daniel Rey) – 5:29
12. "Sleight of Hand" (Ament, Vedder) – 5:13
13. "All or None" (Gossard, Vedder) – 7:42
14. "Lukin" (Vedder) – 2:07

Disc two

15. "Parting Ways" (Vedder) – 5:24
16. "Down" (Gossard, McCready, Vedder) – 3:08
17. "Encore Break" – 0:49
18. "Can't Keep" (Vedder) – 3:15
19. "Dead Man" (Vedder) – 4:24
20. "Masters of War" (Bob Dylan) – 6:06
21. "Black" (Vedder, Gossard) – 7:41
22. "Crazy Mary" (Victoria Williams) – 7:40
23. "25 Minutes to Go" (Shel Silverstein) – 4:43
24. "Daughter" (Abbruzzese, Ament, Gossard, McCready, Vedder) – 6:30
25. "Encore Break" – 1:06
26. "Yellow Ledbetter" (Ament, McCready, Vedder) – 6:01

== Personnel ==
Pearl Jam

- Jeff Ament – bass guitar, double bass
- Matt Cameron – drums
- Stone Gossard – guitars
- Mike McCready – guitars
- Eddie Vedder – vocals, guitars, ukulele

Additional musicians and production

- Ed Brooks at RFI CD Mastering – mastering
- John Burton – recording
- Brett Eliason – mixing
- Boom Gaspar – Hammond B3, Fender Rhodes
- Brad Klausen – design

== Chart positions ==
Chart (2004)	Peak position
Australian Albums (ARIA)	27
Austrian Albums (Ö3 Austria)	31
Belgian Albums (Ultratop Flanders)	38
Canadian Albums (Billboard)	10
Dutch Albums (Album Top 100)	25
French Albums (SNEP)	116
German Albums (Offizielle Top 100)	100
Irish Albums (IRMA)	48
Italian Albums (FIMI)	10
New Zealand (RMNZ)	12
Portuguese Albums (AFP)	2
Scottish Albums (OCC)	67
UK Albums (OCC)	76
US Billboard 200	18
US Top Internet Albums (Billboard)	1
