= Pearl Jam (album) =

- Standard artwork

Studio album by Pearl Jam
- Released: May 2, 2006
- Recorded: November 2004 – February 2006
- Studios: Studio X (Seattle, Washington)
- Genres: Alternative rock; grunge; hard rock
- Length: 49:44
- Label: J
- Producers: Adam Kasper; Pearl Jam

Pearl Jam chronology
Riot Act (2002)	Pearl Jam (2006)	Backspacer (2009)

Singles from Pearl Jam
- 1. "World Wide Suicide" Released: March 14, 2006; 2. "Life Wasted" Released: August 28, 2006; 3. "Gone" Released: September 4, 2006

Pearl Jam is the eighth studio album by American rock band Pearl Jam, released on May 2, 2006 on J Records. It was Pearl Jam's first and only release for J Records, their last album issued by Sony Music. It was the band's first full-length studio release in almost four years, since Riot Act (2002). The band commenced work on Pearl Jam in November 2004 at Studio X in Seattle, Washington and finished in February 2006.

The music on the record was proclaimed as a return to the band's roots, with an emphasis on up-tempo songs with an aggressive sound. The song lyrics are mostly told from the point of view of characters and deal with the socio-political issues in the United States at the period, such as the war on terror.

Pearl Jam was critically well received and a commercial success, debuting at number two on the Billboard 200 chart and eventually outselling the band's previous release, Riot Act. The album also produced three singles—"World Wide Suicide", "Life Wasted" and "Gone"—which were moderately successful. The band supported the album with a full-scale world tour in 2006. Writing for Kerrang!, George Garner called the album "criminally underrated".

== Recording ==
Pearl Jam was recorded at Studio X in Seattle, Washington. The band began work on the album following the 2004 Vote for Change tour in November 2004, and again employed producer Adam Kasper, who worked with them on predecessor Riot Act. The recording sessions started in February 2005, and they worked on it off and on throughout the year, with the sessions being interrupted toward the end of the year when the band toured North America and South America. The album was completed in early 2006. Bassist Jeff Ament attributed the length of time recording to lead vocalist Eddie Vedder having a child and the band touring in the middle of recording. The album was mixed by Kasper at Studio X.

For the first time since 1993's Vs., the band members did not go into the recording sessions with any completed songs, only guitar riffs. Vedder admitted that the band "really went in with nothing". The band sat around playing music together and discussed the song arrangements, and in just one week had completed ten songs. Ament described it as a "real collaborative effort", and Vedder described it as "absolute democracy". Guitarist Mike McCready stated that the band members were feeling "fresh and energetic" and "were communicating better than ever". Toward the end of the sessions it came down to Vedder to finish up the material, with Ament observing that "the way the record started and the way that it finished is probably two different things." Regarding his lyric writing process, Vedder said that he wrote at least four different sets of lyrics for each song, with many going as high as eight. Vedder described as a process that demands "the patience of like a National Geographic photographer sitting underneath the bush in a tent", adding he would at times "figure out after eight, nine or eleven drafts that the first one was actually the one". A total of 25 songs were written before coming down to the 13 on the final track listing. Outtakes include "The Forest", later featured on Ament's 2008 solo album Tone, and "Of the Earth", which started being played live in 2010.

Pearl Jam's contract with Epic Records had ended in 2003, but the band was not ready to release an album without label backing. Independent label Epitaph Records was considered, but the band wanted a company that would guarantee a wide release. Manager Kelly Curtis signed a one-record deal with J Records - which ironically during production became, like Epic, a subsidiary of Sony Music after said company merged with J's parent company BMG. J had approached Pearl Jam as early as 2001, and had its first experiments with the band issuing the live album Live at Benaroya Hall in 2004. Vedder said J was picked as they searched for "somebody who'll allow us to be who we are and respects how we do things" and contributed with the "facilitation of getting the music out there". Gossard added the label did not input any time or creative constraints upon the band—"We didn't play them much music until it was basically done, and they were pleased. They weren't expecting us to do something that was unnatural for us."

== Music and lyrics ==
"World Wide Suicide"
A sample of "World Wide Suicide", the first single released from the album. The song features a raw sound closer to the band's earlier material and features lyrics written by Vedder that depict anger against the war in Iraq.

"Life Wasted"
A sample of "Life Wasted", the second single released from the album. Vedder has said the song's lyrics are about the feelings one has after driving home from a funeral.

A number of critics cited the album as a return to the band's roots. AllMusic critic Stephen Thomas Erlewine said, "Nearly 15 years after Ten, Pearl Jam finally returned to the strengths of their debut with 2006's Pearl Jam, a sharply focused set of impassioned hard rock." Vedder said, "It's easily the best stuff we've done but also some of the hardest stuff. It's very aggressive, because again, it's kind of a product of what it's like to be an American these days. It's pretty aggressive, especially when you turn it loud." Gossard added that after many experimental albums, Pearl Jam was "like a coming together again in terms of accepting our natural strengths and also incorporating the best of our experiments".

The album begins with a number of up-tempo songs before expanding to a variety of tempos for its second half. Vedder attributed the faster and more aggressive songs to the band writing a lot of material that kept getting pared down, with the band leaving behind mid-tempo songs, while Ament suggested that it was because of the band balancing recording and touring which resulted in "physicality ... from being out on the road." The band attempted to create an environment in which McCready and drummer Matt Cameron could play much as they do live. Ament said that there was "a lot of honing of the guitars and vocals in the middle and toward the end", which resulted in the album sounding "more polished". On the overall feeling of the album, Ament said, "The band playing in a room—that came across. There's a kind of immediacy to the record, and that's what we were going for."

"It's understandable why someone would like their entertainment to provide an escape from modern day worries and the reality of war. We feel this record creates a healthy opportunity to process some of these emotions rather than deny them. It's like we took our aggressions and shaped something positive from them in a very direct manner"

— Eddie Vedder on the album's themes

Current socio-political issues in the United States are addressed on the album, with Vedder claiming the record "deals with real content and the moral issues of our time", and crediting as inspiration both the frustration with George W. Bush being reelected, and the birth of Vedder's daughter—"Now that I see it as my daughter's planet, I'm even more (angry)." McCready said, "We all feel that we're living in tumultuous, frightening times, and that ranges from the Iraq war to Hurricane Katrina to wiretapping to anything that smacks of totalitarianism. And just bad political decisions being made. We feel that as Americans, and we're frustrated. So a lot of those feelings have come out in these songs." Vedder also added that among all the dark themes "the hope was going to be in the guitar solos. It was the guitars and drums going at it that was going to lift you out of the dark abyss that I had painted." The Iraq War is addressed in the songs "World Wide Suicide", "Marker in the Sand", and "Army Reserve". The lyrics of "World Wide Suicide" depict anger against the war. Other themes addressed on the album include LSD use ("Severed Hand"), religion ("Marker in the Sand"), poverty ("Unemployable"), leaving everything behind to seek a fresh start ("Gone"), and loneliness ("Come Back").

Many of the songs are written from the point of view of a protagonist, which emerged from an early idea of turning the record into a concept album - as guitarist Stone Gossard explained, "we did consider using narration to thematically unify the album, but ultimately a less conceptual structure just felt right." Vedder added that using characters in the tracks helped with the themes, as the stories could "transmit an emotion or a feeling or an observation of modern reality rather than editorializing, which we've seen plenty of these days".

Vedder added that many songs were inspired by the death of fellow musician Johnny Ramone, whom he described as "the best friend I ever had on the planet". The lyrics of "Life Wasted" in particular were written after attending Ramone's funeral. Vedder said that "Gone" is about a man "needing to find a new life without his past, without his possessions, and not really looking for more possessions." Damien Echols, one of the three members of the West Memphis 3, co-wrote the lyrics to "Army Reserve". For the first time McCready contributed lyrics to a Pearl Jam album, writing the lyrics to the closing track "Inside Job". McCready said that he wrote the lyrics while touring in São Paulo as he "want[ed] this song to happen" despite Vedder not having done the lyrics yet, and added that the lyrical inspiration was the realization that "I had to go inside myself first before I could be open to outside ideas."

== Packaging and versions ==
The album's cover art, photographed by Brad Klausen, depicts an avocado cut in half with the pit still in place. McCready said, "That symbolizes just kind of ... Ed's at the end of the process and said, for all I care right now, we've done such a good job on this record, and we're kind of tired from it. Let's throw an avocado on the cover. I think that's what happened, and our art director goes, hey, that's not a bad idea. I think we were watching the Super Bowl, and we had some guacamole or something." Because the album is self-titled, many fans refer to it as "Avocado" or "The Avocado Album". The cover was named in Pitchfork Media's top 25 worst album covers of 2006. The liner notes art features footage from the "Life Wasted" music video, directed by artist Fernando Apodaca. The photographs involve the band members with their skin decaying and animals crawling in and out of it, as Apodaca felt the songs, "Life Wasted" in particular, fit "my interpretation of the how fragile life is". The album was also issued on a double vinyl.

On the choice of a self-titled album, Vedder explained, "In the end, we thought there was enough there with the title of the songs, so to put another title on the album would have seemed pretentious. So, really, it's actually Nothing by Pearl Jam." During the making of the album Vedder considered the title Superun-owned, a play on Soundgarden's 1994 album, Superunknown. He explained, "We're un-owned. We want to remain un-owned."

Copies of the album were made available for pre-order through Pearl Jam's official website with different CD art and packaging than the retail version, and also a bonus disk featuring the band's show on December 31, 1992 at The Academy Theater in New York City. Pre-order campaigns were also set with iTunes, Amazon and Best Buy, each retailer receiving an exclusive behind-the-scenes or rehearsal clip shot by photographer Danny Clinch.

== Release and promotion ==
The album was released on May 2, 2006. The Sony BMG merger led to some problems in the international distribution, something the band took into consideration during the release of the self-published Backspacer three years later. While Pearl Jam is normally averse to press, to promote the album they performed the album songs on Sessions@AOL, and went to various television shows, including Saturday Night Live, Late Show with David Letterman, and Later... with Jools Holland. Vedder said the exposition happened because "it seem[ed] like a critical time to participate in our democracy." The band also decided to shoot their first conceptual music videos in eight years, "World Wide Suicide" and "Life Wasted".

Three singles were released from Pearl Jam. The lead single "World Wide Suicide" was made available through online music stores (backed with "Unemployable"), and also issued for free download on the band's website. "World Wide Suicide" entered the Billboard Hot 100 at number 41, reached number two on the Mainstream Rock charts, and spent a total of three weeks at number one on the Modern Rock charts. Neither of the album's other commercially released singles, "Life Wasted" and "Gone", charted on the Hot 100, but the former placed on both the Mainstream Rock and Modern Rock charts, while the latter placed on the Modern Rock chart. "Big Wave" was featured in the 2006 Twentieth Century Fox movie, Aquamarine and on the soundtrack to the 2007 Columbia Pictures movie, Surf's Up.

== Tour ==
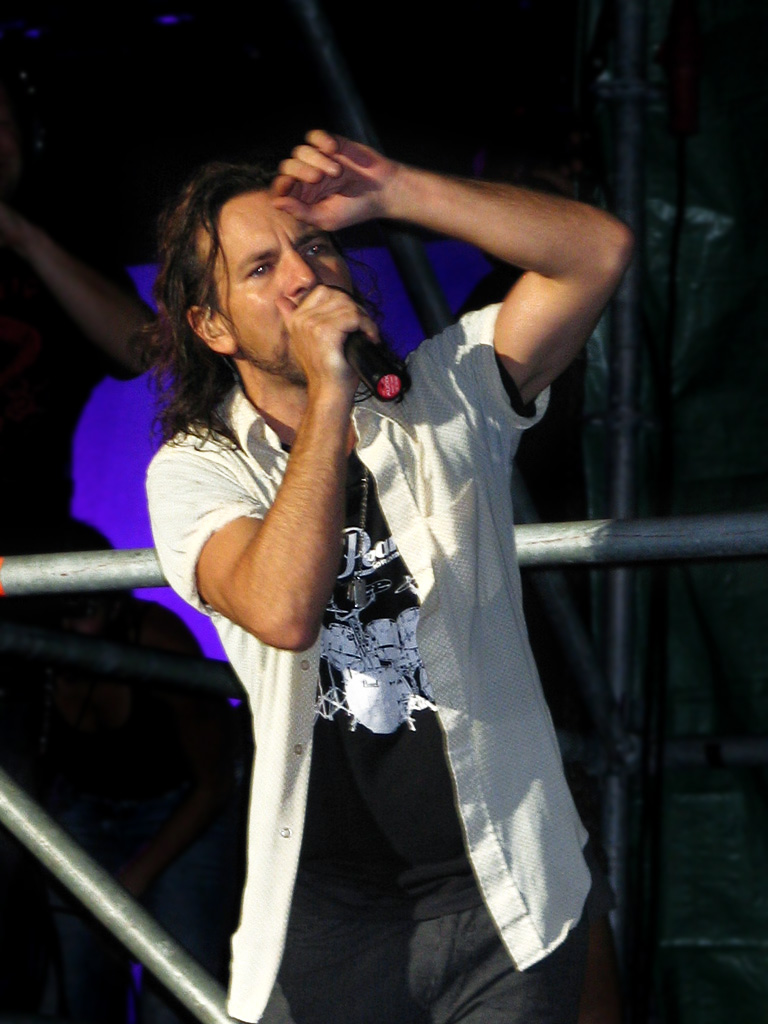
Eddie Vedder on stage with Pearl Jam in Pistoia, Italy on September 20, 2006.

Pearl Jam promoted the album with a tour across North America, Europe, and Australia in 2006. The tour originally had 69 concerts, which were then expanded with three gigs in Hawaii, one of them opening for U2's Vertigo Tour in Honolulu. The first leg of the North American tour focused on the Northeastern United States, and then the band moved to the Midwest and the West Coast for the tour's second leg.

Pearl Jam went on to tour Europe for its first time in six years. The band played a small secret show at the Astoria in London, and headlined the Reading and Leeds Festivals in August 2006, despite having vowed to never play at a festival again after Roskilde. In an interview in advance of the band's return to the festival circuit, Gossard commented, "It seems like an era to trust that we're aware enough to get through those bigger shows. We have a heightened awareness of what needs to happen every night so people are as safe as they can possibly be." Vedder started both concerts with an emotional plea to the crowd to look after each other. He commented during the Leeds set that the band's decision to play a festival for the first time after Roskilde had nothing to do with "guts" but with trust in the audience. On September 19, 2006, at the Torino, Italy show at Palaisozaki, Pearl Jam played Pearl Jam in its entirety in order midway through its set. After Europe, the band headed to Australia and then finished the year with two shows in Hawaii. The official bootlegs on this tour were available only in digital form, in both MP3 and lossless FLAC formats. The band's shows at The Gorge Amphitheatre were released as part of the Live at the Gorge 05/06 box set. A DVD documenting the band's shows in Italy entitled Immagine in Cornice was released in 2007.

== Reception ==
=== Commercial performance ===
Pearl Jam entered the UK charts at number five, the band's highest position there since 2000's Binaural, while it reached number two in the U.S., selling 279,564 copies in its first week. It was held off the top spot by the Tool album, 10,000 Days. As of July 2009, the album has sold 750,000 copies in the United States according to Nielsen SoundScan. Pearl Jam is considered a comeback hit, outselling 2002's Riot Act—by 2009, 750,000 copies as opposed to Riot Act's 508,000—and ranking 90th in Billboard's list of the 200 best-selling albums of 2006. It has been certified gold by the RIAA.

=== Critical response ===
Professional ratings
Review scores
Source	Rating
AllMusic	4.5/5 stars
The A.V. Club	B+
Entertainment Weekly	B+
The Guardian	3/5 stars
The New York Times	(favorable)
Pitchfork	5.5/10
PopMatters	9/10
Rolling Stone	4/5 stars
Slant Magazine	3.5/5 stars
Spin	3/5 stars

According to Metacritic, which assigns a normalized rating out of 100 to reviews from mainstream critics, the album received an average score of 74, based on 28 reviews, indicating "generally favorable reviews". The album was named in Rolling Stone's top 50 albums of the year at number 13. Rolling Stone staff writer David Fricke gave Pearl Jam four out of five stars, calling it the band's best album in ten years. He said it's "the most overtly partisan—and hopeful—record of their lives", adding that it's "as big and brash in fuzz and backbone as Led Zeppelin's Presence." Erlewine gave the album four and a half out of five stars, saying that "Pearl Jam has embraced everything they do well, whether it's their classicist hard rock or heart-on-sleeve humanitarianism." Chris Willman of Entertainment Weekly gave the album a B+, saying that Vedder's "passionate howl seems more valuable now, pitted against the navel-gazing emo whine that's commandeered the landscape," and he went on to say that "in a world full of boys sent to do a man's job of rocking, Pearl Jam can still pull off gravitas." Jon Pareles of The New York Times said, "Now as ever, Pearl Jam takes itself seriously. But it delivers that seriousness not with the sodden self-importance of rock superstardom, but with the craft and hunger of a band still proving itself on the spot." PopMatters writer Michael Metivier gave the album a 9/10 rating and viewed it as a progression in "melody and songcraft" over the band's previous work, writing that it "more consistently achieves the grandeur, rage, and beauty they've always pursued, throughout its entirety".

Brian D. Schiller of Slant Magazine gave the album three and a half out of five stars. He stated that "the album is at best another good step toward their once great state and not a full return to it. What's true, though, is that it's the group's best full album since Vitalogy." Noel Murray of The A.V. Club ranked the album B+, considering it the "tightest Pearl Jam album in a decade", describing the album as a comeback "filled with straight-up, riff-a-riffic rock songs." Mojo gave the album three out of five stars. The review said, "[S]elf-titled with good reason: Pearl Jam sound reborn, vital." Kyle Anderson of Spin gave the album three out of five stars. He said that "rather than rage against the time machine, they seem to be having fun ... Pearl Jam are taking themselves less seriously, and it fits them like a snug flannel shirt." Mat Snow of The Guardian also gave the album three out of five stars. In the review he stated that Vedder "musters absolute conviction in writing and singing lyrics of male teenage angst." Snow observed, "And though few of these 13 numbers have the drama of tracks by the Who or Led Zeppelin, from whom the band draw much of their style, Pearl Jam play like men on a mission." David Raposa of Pitchfork called it the "most consistent effort the group's released since its second album," but he added that it "gets pretty boring pretty ... quick."

== Track listing ==
All lyrics are written by Eddie Vedder, except where noted.

Pearl Jam track listing
No.	Title	Lyrics	Music	Length
1.	"Life Wasted"		Stone Gossard	3:54
2.	"World Wide Suicide"		Vedder	3:29
3.	"Comatose"		Mike McCready, Gossard	2:19
4.	"Severed Hand"		Vedder	4:30
5.	"Marker in the Sand"		McCready	4:23
6.	"Parachutes"		Gossard	3:36
7.	"Unemployable"		Matt Cameron, McCready	3:04
8.	"Big Wave"		Jeff Ament	2:58
9.	"Gone"		Vedder	4:09
10.	"Wasted Reprise^{[I]}"		Gossard	0:53
11.	"Army Reserve"	Vedder, Damien Echols	Ament	3:45
12.	"Come Back"		Vedder, McCready	5:29
13.	"Inside Job^{[II]}"	McCready	McCready, Vedder	7:08
Total length:				49:44

I "Wasted Reprise" contains a reprise of "Life Wasted".

II "Inside Job" contains a brief instrumental hidden track at 6:35.

== Personnel ==
Personnel taken from Pearl Jam liner notes.

Pearl Jam

- Eddie Vedder – vocals, guitar, layout and design; credited as "Jerome Turner" for album concept
- Jeff Ament – bass guitar
- Matt Cameron – drums, percussion
- Stone Gossard – guitar
- Mike McCready – guitar

Additional musicians

- Boom Gaspar – Hammond B3, piano, pump organ
- Gary Westlake – Optigan

Production

- Adam Kasper – production, recording, mixing
- Pearl Jam – production
- Sam Hofstedt, John Burton – engineering
- Fernando Apodaca – art and sculpture, disc design
- Gregg Keplinger, Aaron Mlasko, Steve Rinkov – drum technicians
- Brad Klausen – cover photographs, layout and design
- Jason Mueller – artistic facilitater, disc design
- George Webb – guitar technician

== Charts ==
=== Weekly charts ===
Weekly chart performance for Pearl Jam
Chart (2006)	Peak position
Australian Albums (ARIA)	2
Austrian Albums (Ö3 Austria)	3
Belgian Albums (Ultratop Flanders)	2
Belgian Albums (Ultratop Wallonia)	12
Canadian Albums (Billboard)	2
Danish Albums (Hitlisten)	7
Dutch Albums (Album Top 100)	2
Finnish Albums (Suomen virallinen lista)	13
French Albums (SNEP)	21
German Albums (Offizielle Top 100)	4
Hungarian Albums (MAHASZ)	28
Irish Albums (IRMA)	4
Italian Albums (FIMI)	1
Japanese Albums (Oricon)	19
New Zealand Albums (RMNZ)	2
Norwegian Albums (VG-lista)	4
Portuguese Albums (AFP)	1
Scottish Albums (Official Charts)	5
Spanish Albums (Promusicae)	13
Swedish Albums (Sverigetopplistan)	6
Swiss Albums (Schweizer Hitparade)	2
UK Albums (Official Charts)	5
UK Rock & Metal Albums (Official Charts)	2
US Billboard 200	2
US Top Rock Albums (Billboard)	2

=== Year-end charts ===
Year-end chart performance for Pearl Jam
Chart (2006)	Position
Australian Albums (ARIA)	64
Belgian Albums (Ultratop Flanders)	58
Dutch Albums (Album Top 100)	85
US Billboard 200	90
US Top Rock Albums (Billboard)	18

== Certifications ==
Certifications and sales for Pearl Jam
Region	Certification	Certified units/sales
Australia (ARIA)	Platinum	70,000^{^}
Brazil (Pro-Música Brasil)	Gold	30,000^{*}
Canada (Music Canada)	Platinum	100,000^{^}
New Zealand (RMNZ)	Platinum	15,000^{^}
Portugal (AFP)	Gold	10,000^{^}
United Kingdom (BPI)	Silver	60,000^{^}
United States (RIAA)	Gold	500,000^{^}
^{*} Sales figures based on certification alone.^{^} Shipments figures based on certification alone.
