= Monkeywrench Records =

American record label

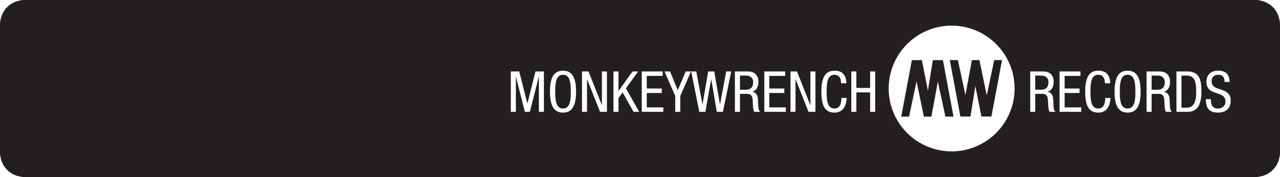
- Founded: 2009
- Founder: Jeff Ament; Stone Gossard; Mike McCready; Eddie Vedder
- Distributors: Republic Records; The Orchard
- Genre: Alternative rock; folk rock
- Country of origin: United States
- Location: Seattle, Washington, U.S.

Monkeywrench Records is an independent United States–based record label, located in Seattle, Washington. The label was founded by members of the alternative rock band Pearl Jam in 2009, following the end of the band's deal with J Records.

The label mostly serves the purpose of releasing Pearl Jam’s albums, as well as some of the band members’ side projects. Four of Pearl Jam’s albums have been released on the label as of April 2024: 2009's Backspacer, 2013's Lightning Bolt, 2020's Gigaton, and 2024's Dark Matter.
