= Pearl Jam 2005 North American and Latin American Tour =

2005 concert tour by Pearl Jam

2005 North American/Latin American Tour
- Tour by Pearl Jam
- Location: North America; South America
- Start date: August 29, 2005
- End date: December 10, 2005
- Legs: 2
- No. of shows: 25 in North America; 9 in South America; 34 in total

Pearl Jam concert chronology
- Vote for Change (2004); 2005 North American/Latin American Tour (2005); 2006 World Tour (2006)

The Pearl Jam 2005 North American/Latin American Tour was a concert tour by the American rock band Pearl Jam.

== History ==
After taking a break from recording its eighth studio album, the band embarked on a Canadian cross-country tour in September 2005, kicking off the tour with a fundraising concert on August 29, 2005 in Missoula, Montana at the University of Montana-Missoula's Adams Event Center for Democratic politician Jon Tester, then playing The Gorge Amphitheatre in George, Washington on September 1, 2005 before crossing into Canada. For its Canadian cross-country tour, the band stopped in cities where it had never played before such as Saskatoon, Quebec City, St. John's, and Halifax. Pearl Jam's performance of "Given to Fly" from Saskatoon was shown on the ReAct Now: Music & Relief benefit concert. After touring Canada, Pearl Jam proceeded to open a Rolling Stones concert on the band's A Bigger Bang Tour on September 28, 2005 in Pittsburgh at PNC Park, then played two shows at the Borgata casino in Atlantic City, New Jersey, before closing the tour with a concert on October 3, 2005 in Philadelphia at the Wachovia Center. The song "Gone" from Pearl Jam's 2006 self-titled album was debuted in a solo performance by vocalist Eddie Vedder at Pearl Jam's October 1, 2005 concert in Atlantic City, New Jersey. Pearl Jam also played a benefit concert to raise money for Hurricane Katrina relief. The concert, which took place October 5, 2005, at the House of Blues in Chicago, also featured Robert Plant of Led Zeppelin fame. The concert proceeds were donated to Habitat for Humanity, the American Red Cross and the Jazz Foundation of America.

On November 22, 2005, Pearl Jam began its first Latin American tour. The tour included two shows in Santiago, Chile at Estadio San Carlos de Apoquindo, two in Buenos Aires, Argentina at Ferrocarril Oeste Stadium, and five in Brazil (Porto Alegre at Gigantinho Gymnasium, Curitiba, two shows in São Paulo at Pacaembu, and Rio de Janeiro at Apoteose). The band finished off 2005 with three shows in Mexico (Monterrey at Auditorio Coca-Cola and two shows in Mexico City at Palacio de los Deportes). Mudhoney, one of the few other remaining bands of the Seattle grunge era, opened for Pearl Jam throughout this tour. During the tour, Vedder emphasized how much he missed Johnny Ramone, his friend and guitarist of the Ramones who died in 2004. As a tribute to Johnny, the band played the Ramones' song "I Believe In Miracles" at every show on the tour, including a performance with Marky Ramone behind the drum kit at the Porto Alegre show.

The official bootlegs for the band's 2005 shows were distributed via Pearl Jam's official website in MP3 form. The music downloads were accompanied by pictures from individual shows. The band's show at The Gorge Amphitheatre was released as part of the Live at the Gorge 05/06 box set.

== Tour dates ==
Date	City	Country	Venue
North America
August 29, 2005	Missoula	United States	Adams Event Center
September 1, 2005	George	United States	The Gorge Amphitheatre
September 2, 2005	Vancouver	Canada	General Motors Place
September 4, 2005	Calgary	Canada	Pengrowth Saddledome
September 5, 2005	Edmonton	Canada	Rexall Place
September 7, 2005	Saskatoon	Canada	Credit Union Centre
September 8, 2005	Winnipeg	Canada	MTS Centre
September 9, 2005	Thunder Bay	Canada	Fort William Gardens
September 11, 2005	Kitchener	Canada	Kitchener Memorial Auditorium
September 12, 2005	London	Canada	John Labatt Centre
September 13, 2005	Hamilton	Canada	Copps Coliseum
September 15, 2005	Montreal	Canada	Bell Centre
September 16, 2005	Ottawa	Canada	Corel Centre
September 19, 2005	Toronto	Canada	Air Canada Centre
September 20, 2005	Quebec City	Canada	Colisée Pepsi
September 22, 2005	Halifax	Canada	Halifax Metro Centre
September 24, 2005	St. John's	Canada	Mile One Centre
September 25, 2005	St. John's	Canada	Mile One Centre
September 30, 2005	Atlantic City	United States	Borgata Events Center
October 1, 2005	Atlantic City	United States	Borgata Events Center
October 3, 2005	Philadelphia	United States	Wachovia Center
October 5, 2005	Chicago	United States	Chicago House of Blues
South America
November 22, 2005	Santiago	Chile	Estadio San Carlos de Apoquindo
November 23, 2005	Santiago	Chile	Estadio San Carlos de Apoquindo
November 25, 2005	Buenos Aires	Argentina	Ferrocarril Oeste Stadium
November 26, 2005	Buenos Aires	Argentina	Ferrocarril Oeste Stadium
November 28, 2005	Porto Alegre	Brazil	Gigantinho Gymnasium
November 30, 2005	Curitiba	Brazil	Pedreira Paulo Leminski
December 2, 2005	São Paulo	Brazil	Estádio do Pacaembu
December 3, 2005	São Paulo	Brazil	Estádio do Pacaembu
December 4, 2005	Rio de Janeiro	Brazil	Sambadrome Marquês de Sapucaí
North America
December 7, 2005	Monterrey	Mexico	Auditorio Coca-Cola
December 9, 2005	Mexico City	Mexico	Palacio de los Deportes
December 10, 2005	Mexico City	Mexico	Palacio de los Deportes

== Band members ==
Pearl Jam

- Jeff Ament – bass guitar
- Stone Gossard – rhythm guitar
- Mike McCready – lead guitar
- Eddie Vedder – lead vocals, guitar
- Matt Cameron – drums

Additional musicians

- Boom Gaspar – Hammond B3 and keyboards

== Songs performed ==
Originals

- "1/2 Full"
- "Alive"
- "Alone"
- "Animal"
- "Around the Bend"
- "Bee Girl"
- "Better Man"
- "Black"
- "Black, Red, Yellow"
- "Blood"
- "Brain of J."
- "Breakerfall"
- "Breath"
- "Bu$hleaguer"
- "Can't Keep"
- "Corduroy"
- "Cropduster"
- "Daughter"
- "Dead Man"
- "Dissident"
- "Do the Evolution"
- "Don't Gimme No Lip"
- "Down"
- "Drifting"
- "Elderly Woman Behind the Counter in a Small Town"
- "Even Flow"
- "Faithfull"
- "Footsteps"
- "Given to Fly"
- "Glorified G"
- "Go"
- "Gone"
- "Green Disease"
- "Grievance"
- "Habit"
- "Hail, Hail"
- "Hard to Imagine"
- "I Am Mine"
- "I Got Id"
- "Immortality"
- "In Hiding"
- "In My Tree"
- "Indifference"
- "Insignificance"
- "Jeremy"
- "Last Exit"
- "Leatherman"
- "Light Years"
- "Long Road"
- "Love Boat Captain"
- "Low Light"
- "Lukin"
- "Man of the Hour"
- "MFC"
- "Not for You"
- "Nothing as It Seems"
- "Nothingman"
- "Oceans"
- "Off He Goes"
- "Once"
- "Porch"
- "Present Tense"
- "Rearviewmirror"
- "Red Mosquito"
- "Release"
- "Sad"
- "Save You"
- "Sleight of Hand"
- "Smile"
- "Sometimes"
- "Soon Forget"
- "Spin the Black Circle"
- "State of Love and Trust"
- "Thumbing My Way"
- "U"
- "Undone"
- "Untitled"
- "W.M.A." (snippet)
- "Wash"
- "Whipping"
- "Wishlist"
- "Yellow Ledbetter"
- "You Are"

Covers

- "American in Me" (Avengers)
- "Androgynous Mind" (Sonic Youth) (snippet)
- "Another Brick in the Wall" (Pink Floyd) (snippet)
- "Atlantic City" (Bruce Springsteen)
- "Atomic Dog" (George Clinton) (snippet)
- "Baba O'Riley" (The Who)
- "Bad" (U2) (snippet)
- "Bleed for Me" (Dead Kennedys)
- "Blitzkrieg Bop" (Ramones) (snippet)
- "Cowboy Song" (Thin Lizzy)
- "Crazy Mary" (Victoria Williams)
- "Crown of Thorns" (Mother Love Bone)
- "Don't Be Shy" (Cat Stevens)
- "Dream Baby Dream" (Suicide) (snippet)
- "Driven to Tears" (The Police)
- "Eleanor Rigby" (The Beatles) (snippet)
- "Fool in the Rain" (Led Zeppelin)
- "Fortunate Son" (Creedence Clearwater Revival)
- "Fuckin' Up" (Neil Young)
- "Gimme Some Truth" (John Lennon)
- "Going to California" (Led Zeppelin)
- "Growin' Up" (Bruce Springsteen)
- "Hard Times Are Over" (Yoko Ono) (snippet)
- "Harvest Moon" (Neil Young)
- "I Believe in Miracles" (Ramones)
- "I Wanna Be Your Boyfriend" (Ramones) (snippet)
- "I Won't Back Down" (Tom Petty)
- "Interstellar Overdrive" (Pink Floyd) (snippet)
- "It's OK" (Dead Moon) (snippet)
- "Kick Out the Jams" (MC5)
- "Last Kiss" (Wayne Cochran)
- "Leaving Here" (Edward Holland, Jr.)
- "Little Sister" (Elvis Presley)
- "Modern Girl" (Sleater-Kinney) (snippet)
- "Money (That's What I Want)" (Barrett Strong)
- "Mother" (Danzig)
- "No Surrender" (Bruce Springsteen)
- "Poor Girl" (X)
- "The Promised Land" (Bruce Springsteen)
- "Rockin' in the Free World" (Neil Young)
- "Ruby Tuesday" (The Rolling Stones) (snippet)
- "Runnin' Back to Saskatoon" (The Guess Who)
- "Save It for Later" (The Beat) (snippet)
- "Sonic Reducer" (The Dead Boys)
- "Suck You Dry" (Mudhoney) (snippet)
- "Thank You" (Led Zeppelin)
- "Throw Your Arms Around Me" (Hunters & Collectors)
- "Trouble" (Cat Stevens)
- "Wild Horses" (The Rolling Stones)
- "Yahweh" (U2) (snippet)
- "You've Got to Hide Your Love Away" (The Beatles)

== Gallery ==
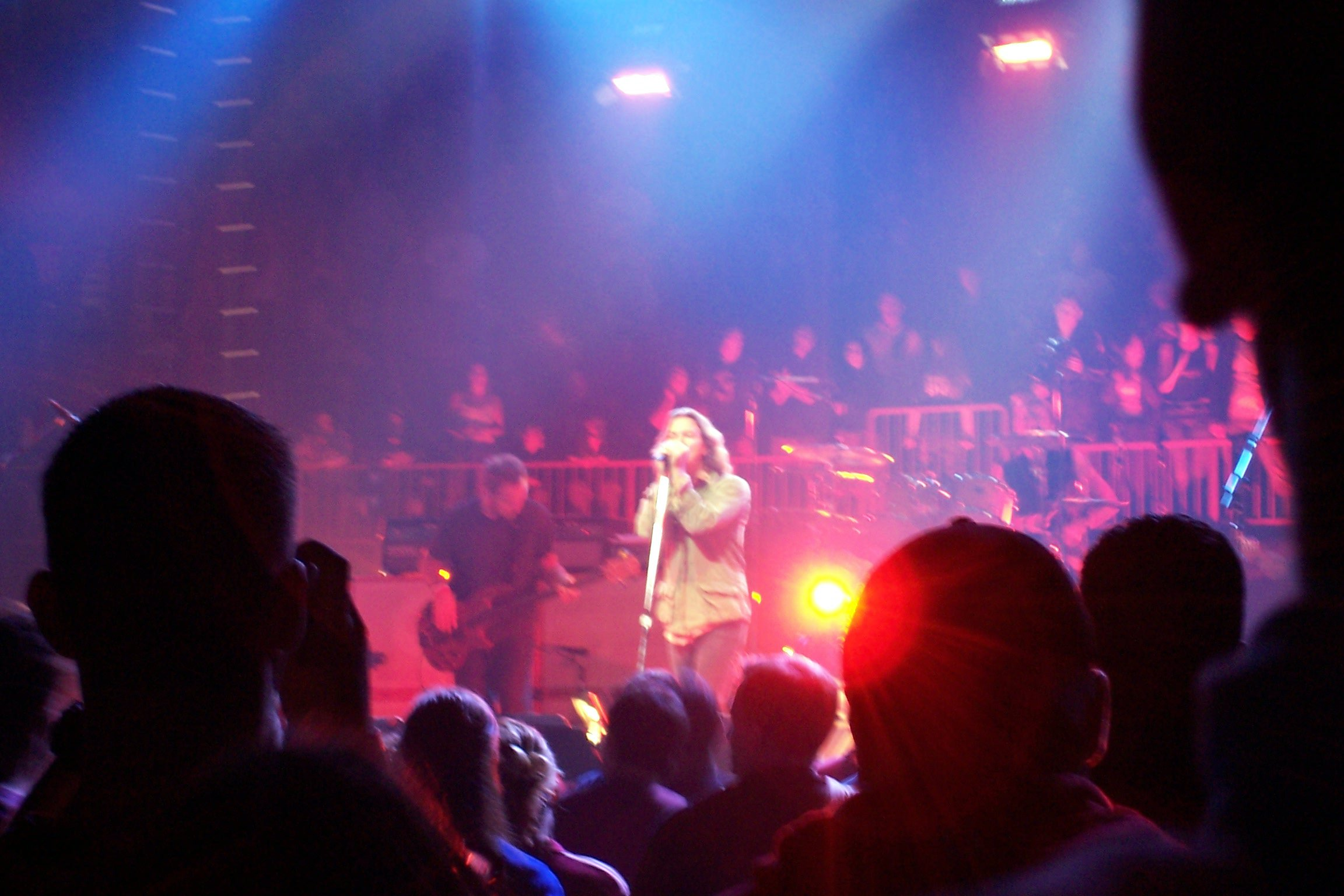
Pearl Jam in St. John's, Newfoundland, Canada on September 24, 2005.

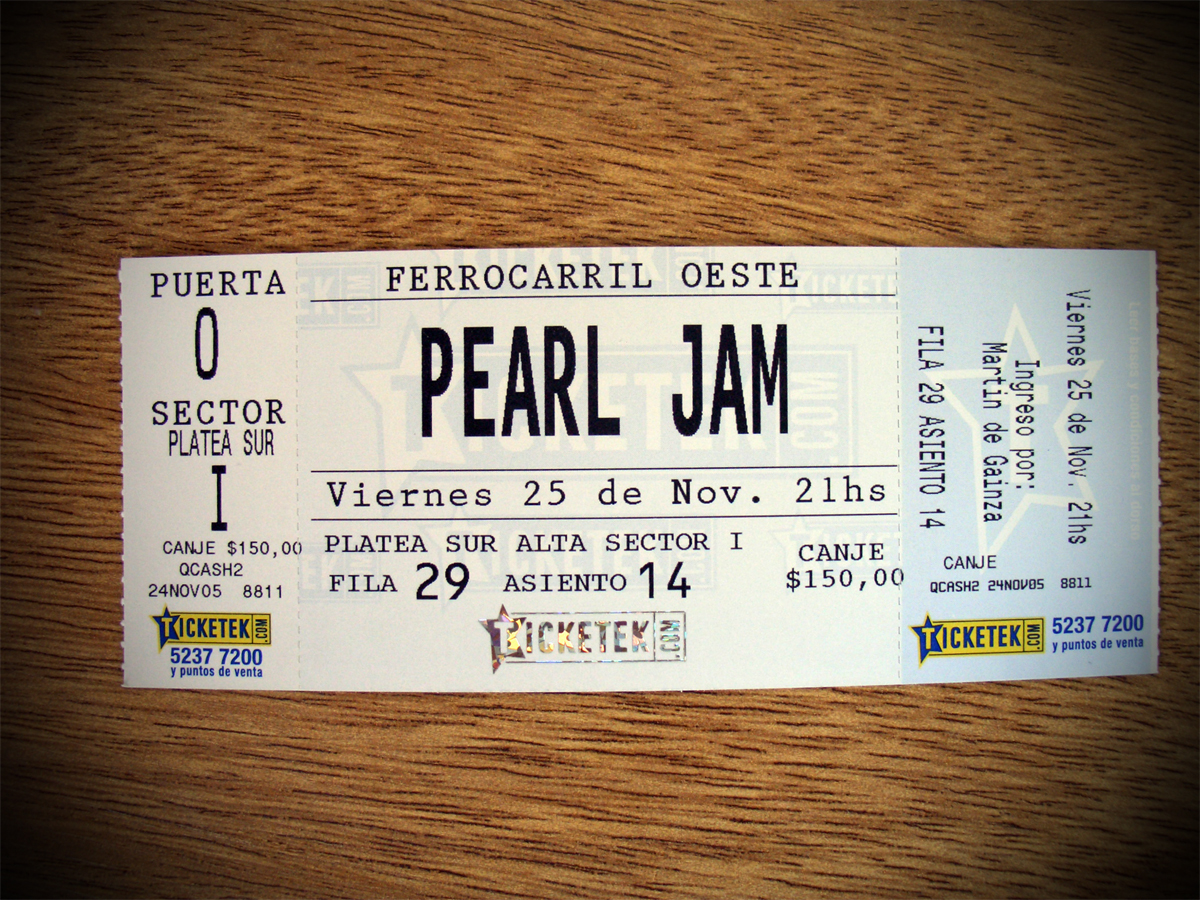
A ticket from the show in Buenos Aires, Argentina on November 25, 2005.

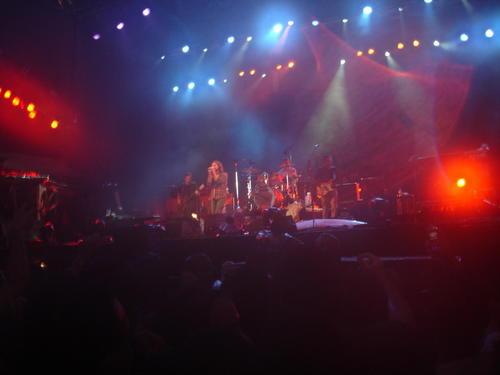
Pearl Jam in São Paulo, Brazil on December 2, 2005.

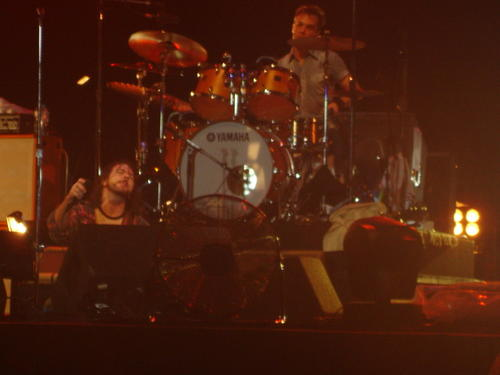
Pearl Jam in São Paulo, Brazil on December 2, 2005.

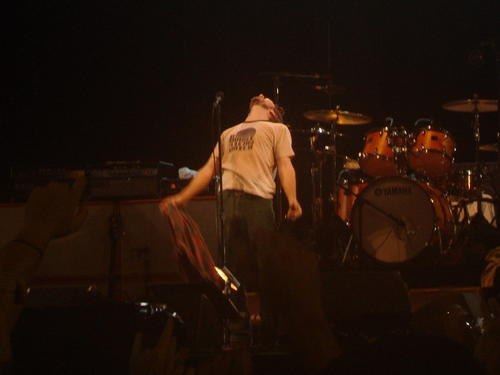
Eddie Vedder on stage with Pearl Jam in São Paulo, Brazil on December 2, 2005.

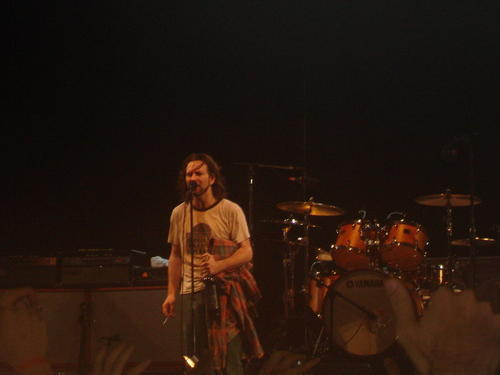
Eddie Vedder on stage with Pearl Jam in São Paulo, Brazil on December 2, 2005.
