= 7/8/03 – New York, New York =

Live album by Pearl Jam
- Released: September 16, 2003
- Recorded: July 8, 2003; Madison Square Garden, New York City, New York, United States
- Genre: Alternative rock
- Length: 165:25
- Language: English
- Label: Epic

Pearl Jam chronology
7/6/03 – Camden, New Jersey (2003)	7/8/03 – New York, New York (2003)	7/9/03 – New York, New York (2003)

7/8/03 – New York, New York is a three-disc live album by the American alternative rock band Pearl Jam. It was released to retail stores on September 16, 2003.

== Overview ==
The album was recorded live in New York City at Madison Square Garden on July 8, 2003. The album features an improv by lead guitarist Mike McCready within "Even Flow" that goes on for nearly five minutes. "Wishlist" contains a tag of the Buzzcocks song "Why Can't I Touch It?" Pearl Jam performed the Mother Love Bone song "Crown of Thorns" at the concert. Vocalist Eddie Vedder, in tribute to the late Mother Love Bone vocalist Andrew Wood, said, "I think Jeff and Stone will back me up on this, Andy would have loved it here."

It is one of three official bootlegs that Pearl Jam released in stores from the second leg of its North American Riot Act Tour, and it was one of six official bootlegs released overall to retail stores. Allmusic gave it three out of a possible five stars. Allmusic staff writer James Christopher Monger said that "the set loses momentum and things begin to fall apart." It is also available packaged as a boxed set with the next night, 7/9/03, also at Madison Square Garden. The show is also available as the Live at the Garden DVD.

== Track listing ==
=== Disc one ===
1. "Love Boat Captain" (Boom Gaspar, Eddie Vedder) – 5:12
2. "Last Exit" (Dave Abbruzzese, Jeff Ament, Stone Gossard, Mike McCready, Vedder) – 2:31
3. "Save You" (Ament, Matt Cameron, Gossard, McCready, Vedder) – 3:29
4. "Green Disease" (Vedder) – 2:52
5. "In My Tree" (Gossard, Jack Irons, Vedder) – 5:29
6. "Cropduster" (Cameron, Vedder) – 4:46
7. "Even Flow" (Vedder, Gossard) – 8:07
8. "Gimme Some Truth" (John Lennon) – 5:07
9. "I Am Mine" (Vedder) – 4:09
10. "Low Light" (Ament) – 3:41
11. "Faithfull" (McCready, Vedder) – 5:22
12. "Wishlist" (Vedder) – 8:22

=== Disc two ===
1. "Lukin" (Vedder) – 1:02
2. "Grievance" (Vedder) – 3:18
3. "1/2 Full" (Ament, Vedder) – 4:59
4. "Black" (Vedder, Gossard) – 7:37
5. "Spin the Black Circle" (Abbruzzese, Ament, Gossard, McCready, Vedder) – 3:13
6. "Rearviewmirror" (Abbruzzese, Ament, Gossard, McCready, Vedder) – 8:00
7. "Encore Break" – 0:52
8. "You Are" (Cameron, Vedder) – 4:53
9. "Thumbing My Way" (Vedder) – 4:28
10. "Daughter" (Abbruzzese, Ament, Gossard, McCready, Vedder) (with Ben Harper) – 10:10

=== Disc three ===
1. "Crown of Thorns" (Ament, Bruce Fairweather, Greg Gilmore, Gossard, Andrew Wood) – 7:29
2. "Breath" (Vedder, Gossard) – 7:17
3. "Better Man" (Vedder) – 5:01
4. "Do the Evolution" (Gossard, Vedder) – 3:51
5. "Encore Break" – 3:50
6. "Crazy Mary" (Victoria Williams) – 6:45
7. "Indifference" (Abbruzzese, Ament, Gossard, McCready, Vedder) (with Ben Harper) – 6:58
8. "Sonic Reducer" (Gene O'Connor, David Thomas) (with Tony Barber of the Buzzcocks) – 5:08
9. "Baba O'Riley" (Pete Townshend) (with Steve Diggle of the Buzzcocks) – 4:55
10. "Yellow Ledbetter" (Ament, McCready, Vedder) – 6:32

== Personnel ==
Pearl Jam

- Jeff Ament – bass guitar, design concept
- Matt Cameron – drums
- Stone Gossard – guitars
- Mike McCready – guitars
- Eddie Vedder – vocals, guitars

Additional musicians and production

- Tony Barber – bass on "Sonic Reducer"
- Ed Brooks at RFI CD Mastering – mastering
- John Burton – engineering
- Steve Diggle – guitar on "Baba O'Riley"
- Brett Eliason – mixing
- Boom Gaspar – Hammond B3, Fender Rhodes
- Ben Harper – vocals on "Daughter" and "Indifference"
- Brad Klausen – design and layout

== Chart positions ==
Chart (2003)	Position
Top Internet Albums	5
