= Immagine in Cornice =

Video by Pearl Jam
- Released: September 25, 2007
- Recorded: September 14–20, 2006, Bologna, Verona, Milan, Torino and Pistoia, Italy
- Genre: Alternative rock
- Length: 92 minutes
- Language: English
- Label: Rhino/WEA
- Director: Danny Clinch
- Producer: Lindha Narvaez

Pearl Jam chronology
Live at the Garden (2003)	Immagine in Cornice (2007)	Let's Play Two (2017)

Immagine in Cornice, Italian for "picture in a frame", is a live concert film documenting the 2006 five-concert tour of Italy by the American alternative rock band Pearl Jam. It was released on September 25, 2007.

== Overview ==
The film documents Pearl Jam on its 2006 World Tour. It was directed by renowned photographer Danny Clinch. The film includes behind-the-scenes footage as well as performances from the band's shows in Bologna, Verona, Milan, Torino and Pistoia, Italy. It was shot in various formats, ranging from Super-8 to high definition. Immagine in Cornice has been certified gold by the RIAA.

== Track listing ==
Information taken from various sources.

1. "Severed Hand"
  - 9/17/06, Forum, Milan, Italy
2. "World Wide Suicide"
  - Mixed from 9/14/06, PalaMalaguti, Bologna, Italy, 9/16/06, Arena di Verona, Verona, Italy, 9/17/06, Forum, Milan, Italy, 9/19/06, Palaisozaki, Torino, Italy, and 9/20/06, Duomo Square, Pistoia, Italy
3. "Life Wasted"
  - 9/19/06, Palaisozaki, Turin, Italy
4. "Corduroy"
  - 9/16/06, Arena di Verona, Verona, Italy
5. "State of Love and Trust"
  - 9/17/06, Mediolanum Forum, Milan, Italy
6. "Porch"
  - 9/16/06, Arena di Verona, Verona, Italy
7. "Even Flow"
  - 9/19/06, Palaisozaki, Turin, Italy
8. "Better Man"
  - 9/16/06, Arena di Verona, Verona, Italy
9. "Alive"
  - 9/17/06, Mediolanum Forum, Milan, Italy
10. "Blood"
  - 9/16/06, Arena di Verona, Verona, Italy
11. "Comatose"
  - 9/20/06, Duomo Square, Pistoia, Italy
12. "Come Back"
  - 9/20/06, Duomo Square, Pistoia, Italy
13. "Rockin' in the Free World"
  - 9/20/06, Duomo Square, Pistoia, Italy
- The end credits are set to "Love Boat Captain" taken from 9/16/06, Arena di Verona, Verona, Italy.

=== Bonus songs ===
- "A Quick One, While He's Away" (9/19/06, Palaisozaki, Turin, Italy, with My Morning Jacket)
- "Throw Your Arms Around Me" (9/20/06, Duomo Square, Pistoia, Italy)
- "Yellow Ledbetter" (9/17/06, Mediolanum Forum, Milan, Italy)

== Personnel ==
Pearl Jam

- Jeff Ament – bass guitar, backing vocals on "Rockin' in the Free World"
- Matt Cameron – drums, backing vocals on "Severed Hand", "World Wide Suicide", "Life Wasted" and "Even Flow"
- Stone Gossard – guitars, backing vocals on "Better Man" and "Rockin' in the Free World"
- Mike McCready – guitars
- Eddie Vedder – vocals, guitars

Additional musician and production

- John Burton – recording
- Danny Clinch – direction
- Brett Eliason – mixing
- Boom Gaspar – Hammond B3, Fender Rhodes
- Lindha Narvaez – production

== Chart positions ==
Chart (2007)	Position
US Top Music Videos	1
