= Live at the Garden =

Video by Pearl Jam
- Released: November 11, 2003
- Recorded: July 8, 2003, Madison Square Garden, New York, New York
- Genre: Alternative rock
- Length: 210 minutes
- Language: English
- Label: Epic

Pearl Jam chronology
Live at the Showbox (2003)	Live at the Garden (2003)	Immagine in Cornice (2007)

Live at the Garden is the fourth DVD release by the American alternative rock band Pearl Jam, recorded on July 8, 2003 at Madison Square Garden in New York City. It was released on November 11, 2003.

== Overview ==
The DVD documents Pearl Jam on its 2003 Riot Act Tour, the band's first with organist Boom Gaspar. The concert was also made available as the 7/8/03 - New York, New York official bootleg. It includes several bonus songs, including four montages, as well as the Matt Cam feature (which debuted on one of the band's previous DVD releases, Touring Band 2000) with which you can watch selected songs from the camera focused on drummer Matt Cameron. Live at the Garden has been certified three times platinum by the RIAA.

The DVD features an improv by lead guitarist Mike McCready within "Even Flow" that goes on for nearly five minutes. "Wishlist" contains a tag of the Buzzcocks song "Why Can't I Touch It?" Pearl Jam performed the Mother Love Bone song "Crown of Thorns" at the concert. Vocalist Eddie Vedder, in tribute to the late Mother Love Bone vocalist Andrew Wood, says, "I think Jeff and Stone will back me up on this: Andy would have loved it here."

== Track listing ==
=== DVD one ===
1. "Love Boat Captain"
2. "Last Exit"
3. "Save You"
4. "Green Disease"
5. "In My Tree"
6. "Cropduster"
7. "Even Flow"
8. "Gimme Some Truth"
9. "I Am Mine"
10. "Low Light"
11. "Faithful"
12. "Wishlist"/"Why Can't I Touch It?"
13. "Lukin"
14. "Grievance"
15. "1/2 Full"
16. "Black"
17. "Spin the Black Circle"
18. "Rearviewmirror"

=== DVD two ===
1. "You Are"
2. "Thumbing My Way"
3. "Daughter" (with Ben Harper)
4. "Crown of Thorns"
5. "Breath"
6. "Better Man"
7. "Do the Evolution"
8. "Crazy Mary"
9. "Indifference" (with Ben Harper)
10. "Sonic Reducer" (with Tony Barber of Buzzcocks)
11. "Baba O'Riley" (with Steve Diggle of Buzzcocks)
12. "Yellow Ledbetter"

=== Bonus songs ===
- "Throw Your Arms Around Me" (2/23/03, Burswood Dome, Perth, Australia, with Mark Seymour of Hunters and Collectors)
- "Dead Man" (7/14/03, PNC Bank Arts Center, Holmdel, New Jersey, Solo performance by Eddie Vedder)
- "Bu$hleaguer" (mixed from various dates)
- "Fortunate Son" (mixed from various dates, with Johnny Marr, Betchadupa, Zak Starkey, Cheetah Chrome, Sleater-Kinney, Corin Tucker, Mike Tyler, Steve Earle, Jack Irons, Ben Harper, Billy Gibbons, Ann and Nancy Wilson, Idlewild, and the Buzzcocks)
- "Down" (Studio version, with montage of the band pre-show)
- "All Those Yesterdays" (Audio taken from 7/11/03, Tweeter Center Boston, Mansfield, Massachusetts, acoustic, with crew montage)

=== Matt Cam songs ===
- "Last Exit"
- "Green Disease"
- "Cropduster"
- "You Are"
- "Crown of Thorns"

=== Easter egg ===
- The DVD contains an easter egg in the form of "Hunger Strike" from 7/19/03, Palacio de los Deportes, Mexico City, Mexico, performed with Corin Tucker of Sleater-Kinney. To access it, click on the setlist feature on the main menu screen of disk one, scroll down to "Black" and hit the right button twice rapidly.
- If the above method doesn't work you can also try inserting disc 1, press stop until you have your DVD players loading screen, press 2 then press play.

== Personnel ==
Pearl Jam

- Jeff Ament – bass guitar, backing vocals (on "In My Tree", "Low Light", "Breath", "Do the Evolution" and "Sonic Reducer")
- Matt Cameron – drums, backing vocals (on "Cropduster", "Faithful", "You Are" and "Breath")
- Stone Gossard – guitar, backing vocals (on "Green Disease", "In My Tree", "Cropduster", "Rearviewmirror", "Breath", "Better Man", "Do the Evolution" and "Sonic Reducer")
- Mike McCready – guitar
- Ed Vedder – lead vocals, guitar

Additional musicians and production

- Tony Barber – bass guitar on "Sonic Reducer"
- Liz Burns, Kevin Shuss, Brandon Vedder – filming
- John Burton – recording
- Steve Diggle – guitar on "Baba O'Riley"
- Brett Eliason – mixing
- Boom Gaspar – Hammond B3, Fender Rhodes
- Steve Gordon – filming, editing
- Ben Harper – vocals on "Daughter" and "Indifference"
- Ted Jensen at Sterling Sound – mastering
- Brad Klausen – design and layout

== Chart positions ==
Chart (2003)	Position
US Top Music Videos	2
