= Rearviewmirror (Greatest Hits 1991–2003) =

Greatest hits album by Pearl Jam
- Released: November 16, 2004
- Recorded: 1991–2003
- Genres: Alternative rock; grunge
- Length: 143:19
- Label: Epic
- Producers: Tchad Blake, Brett Eliason, Adam Kasper, Brendan O'Brien, Rick Parashar, Pearl Jam

Pearl Jam compilations chronology
Lost Dogs (2003)	Rearviewmirror (Greatest Hits 1991–2003) (2004)	Pearl Jam Twenty (2011)

Professional ratings
Review scores
Source	Rating
AllMusic	4.5/5 stars
Blender	4/5 stars
The Guardian	4/5 stars
Pitchfork	5.9/10
Rolling Stone	4/5 stars
Stylus	A−
Uncut	3/5 stars

Rearviewmirror (Greatest Hits 1991–2003) is a two-disc compilation album by the American rock band Pearl Jam, released on November 16, 2004, through Epic Records. The album has been certified platinum by the RIAA in the United States. It was reissued in 2013 as The Essential Pearl Jam.

== Overview ==
The compilation debuted at number 16 on the Billboard 200 chart, selling 96,000 copies in its first week of release. rearviewmirror (Greatest Hits 1991–2003) has been certified platinum by the RIAA.

The album's two discs are both devoted to different sides of the band's catalogue: the first disc, or "Up Side", contains heavier rock songs while the second disc or "Down Side" consists of slower songs and ballads. Both discs are in chronological order, with the exception of the last song on the "Down Side", regular show closer "Yellow Ledbetter".

The tracks "Once", "Alive", and "Black" were remixed by Brendan O'Brien. Pearl Jam's version of the Victoria Williams song "Crazy Mary" was supposed to appear on disc two, but was replaced with "Man of the Hour" before release. This release marked the end of Pearl Jam's contractual agreement with Epic Records.

AllMusic staff writer Stephen Thomas Erlewine gave the album four and a half out of five stars. He said that the album "does an expert job not only of capturing the moment when Pearl Jam were monstrously popular, but proving that they still turned out good music even when they were fading from the spotlight. Unlike most career-spanning, multi-disc retrospectives, Rearviewmirror does not emphasize latter-day albums in order to achieve a sense of balance that's inherently phony." Rolling Stone staff writer Christian Hoard gave the album four out of five stars, saying, "Pearl Jam have spent much of this decade courting devotees with a series of live bootlegs, so Rearviewmirror is a welcome concession to casual fans, rounding out the hits with concert staples and non-album cuts. The rockers on the "Up Side" disc sum up the band's continually evolving relationship with effects pedals and emotional catharsis; the slower "Down Side" disc offers gold sounds that are long on big choruses and well-worn sincerity."

== Track listing ==
All lyrics are written by Eddie Vedder, except where noted.

Disc one
No.	Title	Music	Length
1.	"Once (2004 remix)" (from Ten, 1991)	Stone Gossard	3:16
2.	"Alive (2004 remix)" (from Ten, 1991)	Gossard	5:42
3.	"Even Flow (single version)" (original version on Ten, single version released 1992)	Gossard	5:03
4.	"Jeremy" (from Ten, 1991)	Jeff Ament	5:20
5.	"State of Love and Trust" (from Singles: Original Motion Picture Soundtrack, 1992)	Mike McCready, Ament	3:43
6.	"Animal" (from Vs., 1993)	Gossard, Ament, Vedder, McCready, Dave Abbruzzese	2:47
7.	"Go" (from Vs., 1993)	Abbruzzese, Gossard, Ament, Vedder, McCready	3:12
8.	"Dissident" (from Vs., 1993)	Gossard, Ament, Vedder, McCready, Abbruzzese	3:34
9.	"Rearviewmirror" (from Vs., 1993)	Vedder	4:44
10.	"Spin the Black Circle" (from Vitalogy, 1994)	Gossard, Vedder, McCready, Ament, Abbruzzese	2:48
11.	"Corduroy" (from Vitalogy, 1994)	Vedder, McCready, Gossard, Ament, Abbruzzese	4:39
12.	"Not for You" (from Vitalogy, 1994)	Gossard, Ament, Vedder, McCready, Abbruzzese	5:53
13.	"I Got Id" (from the Merkin Ball single (with Neil Young)	Vedder	4:51
14.	"Hail, Hail" (from No Code, 1996)	Gossard, Ament, McCready	3:44
15.	"Do the Evolution" (from Yield, 1998)	Gossard	3:52
16.	"Save You" (from Riot Act, 2002)	McCready, Vedder, Ament, Gossard, Matt Cameron	3:55
Total length:			67:04

Disc two
No.	Title	Lyrics	Music	Length
1.	"Black (2004 remix)" (from Ten, 1991)		Gossard	5:39
2.	"Breath" (from Singles: Original Motion Picture Soundtrack, 1992)		Gossard	5:24
3.	"Daughter" (from Vs., 1993)		Gossard, Ament, Vedder, McCready, Abbruzzese	3:56
4.	"Elderly Woman Behind the Counter in a Small Town" (from Vs., 1993)		Vedder, Godssard, Ament, McCready, Abbruzzese	3:15
5.	"Immortality" (from Vitalogy, 1994)		Gossard, Ament, Vedder, McCready, Abbruzzese	5:12
6.	"Better Man" (from Vitalogy, 1994)		Vedder	4:28
7.	"Nothingman" (from Vitalogy, 1994)		Ament	4:34
8.	"Who You Are" (from No Code, 1996)		Gossard, Jack Irons	3:53
9.	"Off He Goes" (from No Code, 1996)		Vedder	6:00
10.	"Given to Fly" (from Yield, 1998)		McCready	4:00
11.	"Wishlist" (from Yield, 1998)		Vedder	3:26
12.	"Last Kiss" (from the 1998 fan club Christmas single)	Wayne Cochran	Cochran	3:17
13.	"Nothing as It Seems" (from Binaural, 2000)	Ament	Ament	5:21
14.	"Light Years" (from Binaural, 2000)		Vedder, Gossard, McCready	5:10
15.	"I Am Mine" (from Riot Act, 2002)		Vedder	3:36
16.	"Man of the Hour" (from the Big Fish soundtrack, 2003)		Vedder	3:45
17.	"Yellow Ledbetter" (from the "Jeremy" single, 1992)		McCready, Ament	5:03
Total length:				75:59

== Personnel ==
=== Pearl Jam ===
- Stone Gossard – guitars; bass ("Do The Evolution")
- Jeff Ament – bass (except "Do The Evolution"), album concept, additional booklet photos
- Eddie Vedder – vocals, guitars
- Mike McCready – guitars
- Dave Krusen – drums on Ten, "Yellow Ledbetter"
- Dave Abbruzzese – drums on Singles: Original Motion Picture Soundtrack, Vs., Vitalogy
- Jack Irons – drums on Merkin Ball, No Code, Yield
- Matt Cameron – drums on "Last Kiss", Binaural, Riot Act, "Man of the Hour"

=== Additional musicians and production ===
- Matt Bayles, John Burton, Caram Costanzo, Don Gilmore, Dave Hillis, Sam Hofstedt, Adrian Moore, Adam Samuels, Kevin Scott, Trina Shoemaker, Ashley Stubbert – engineering
- Tchad Blake – production, mixing
- Nick DiDia – mixing, engineering
- Brett Eliason – production, mixing, engineering
- Boom Gaspar – Hammond B3, Fender Rhodes on Riot Act
- Walter Gray – cello on "Jeremy"
- Adam Kasper – production, engineering
- Brad Klausen – design and layout
- Bob Ludwig at Gateway Mastering – mastering
- Lance Mercer – photos
- Brendan O'Brien – production, mixing, engineering; bass guitar on "I Got Id", pump organ, Hammond organ, piano; remixing on "Once", "Alive", and "Black"
- Tim Palmer – mixing
- Rick Parashar – production, engineering, piano on "Black"
- Pearl Jam – production
- George Webb – equipment manager
- Neil Young – guitar on "I Got Id"

== Chart positions ==
=== Weekly charts ===
2004 weekly chart performance for Rearviewmirror (Greatest Hits 1991–2003)
Chart (2004)	Peak position
Australian Albums Chart	2
Austrian Albums Chart	66
Belgian Albums Chart (Vl)	23
Canadian Albums Chart	10
Dutch Albums Chart	32
German Albums (Offizielle Top 100)	75
Irish Albums Chart	22
Italian Albums Chart	57
New Zealand Albums Chart	3
Norwegian Albums Chart	25
Portuguese Albums Chart	10
Swedish Albums Chart	15
Swiss Albums Chart	75
UK Albums Chart	58
US Billboard 200	16
US Top Internet Albums	13

2022–2025 weekly chart performance for Rearviewmirror (Greatest Hits 1991–2003)
Chart (2022–2025)	Peak position
Belgian Albums (Ultratop Wallonia)	12
German Albums (Offizielle Top 100)	11
Greek Albums (IFPI)	6
Portuguese Albums (AFP)	2
Swiss Albums (Schweizer Hitparade)	28
US Billboard 200	15

=== Decade-end chart ===
Decade-end chart performance for Rearviewmirror (Greatest Hits 1991–2003)
Chart (2000–2009)	Position
Australian Albums (ARIA)	60

== Certifications ==
Certifications for Rearviewmirror (Greatest Hits 1991–2003)
Region	Certification	Certified units/sales
Australia (ARIA)	5× Platinum	350,000^{^}
Canada (Music Canada)	Gold	50,000^{^}
New Zealand (RMNZ)	4× Platinum	60,000^{^}
United Kingdom (BPI)	Platinum	300,000^{*}
United States (RIAA)	Platinum	1,000,000^{^}
^{*} Sales figures based on certification alone.^{^} Shipments figures based on certification alone.
