= Live at the Showbox =

Video by Pearl Jam
- Released: May 7, 2003
- Recorded: December 6, 2002, The Showbox, Seattle, Washington
- Genre: Alternative rock
- Length: 123 minutes
- Language: English
- Label: Ten Club

Pearl Jam chronology
Touring Band 2000 (2001)	Live at the Showbox (2003)	Live at the Garden (2003)

Live at the Showbox is the third DVD release by the American alternative rock band Pearl Jam, and the first DVD of a complete show. It was released on May 7, 2003.

== Overview ==
It was recorded on December 6, 2002 at The Showbox in the band's hometown of Seattle, Washington. The show was the second of four warm-up gigs for the band's 2003 Riot Act Tour. The DVD is only available through the band's official website. The particular performance of "Daughter" at this show was notable for Vedder's animated and profanity-laced tag of Edwin Starr's "War", ending in Vedder throwing his mic stand.

== Track listing ==
1. "Elderly Woman Behind the Counter in a Small Town"
2. "Off He Goes"
3. "Thumbing My Way"
4. "Thin Air"
5. "Breakerfall"
6. "Green Disease"
7. "Corduroy"
8. "Save You"
9. "Ghost"
10. "Cropduster"
11. "I Am Mine"
12. "Love Boat Captain"
13. "Gods' Dice"
14. "1/2 Full"
15. "Daughter"/"War"
16. "You Are"
17. "Rearviewmirror"
18. "Bu$hleaguer"
19. "Insignificance"
20. "Better Man"
21. "Do the Evolution"
22. "Yellow Ledbetter"
23. "Soon Forget"
24. "Don't Believe in Christmas"

== Personnel ==
Pearl Jam

- Jeff Ament – bass guitar, backing vocals (9, 13, 19, 21, 24)
- Matt Cameron – drums, backing vocals (10, 16, 18)
- Stone Gossard – guitar, backing vocals (6, 9, 10, 17–21)
- Mike McCready – guitar
- Eddie Vedder – vocals, guitar

Additional musicians and production

- Ed Brooks at RFI CD Mastering – mastering
- Liz Burns, Kevin Shuss – filming
- John Burton – recording
- Brett Eliason – mixing
- Boom Gaspar – Hammond B3, Fender Rhodes
- Steve Gordon – filming, editing
- Brad Klausen – design and layout
