= ½ Full =

"1/2 Full"

Song by Pearl Jam

from the album Riot Act
- Released: November 12, 2002
- Recorded: February–May 2002
- Studio: Studio X, Seattle, Washington
- Genre: Blues rock
- Length: 4:10
- Label: Epic
- Composer: Jeff Ament
- Lyricist: Eddie Vedder
- Producers: Adam Kasper, Pearl Jam

"1/2 Full" is a song by the American rock band Pearl Jam. Featuring lyrics written by vocalist Eddie Vedder and music written by bassist Jeff Ament, "1/2 Full" is the thirteenth track on the band's seventh studio album, Riot Act (2002).

== Origin and recording ==
"1/2 Full" features lyrics written by vocalist Eddie Vedder and music written by bassist Jeff Ament. Guitarist Stone Gossard on the song:

A Jeff Ament rocker. He came in with "Ghost" and "1/2 Full"—he had the basic parts. Literally, he showed them to me. Then, everyone came in and played them two or three times, then those were done. Ed either came in and sang them right with us, or put lyrics on them over the course of the next week. We literally played those songs maybe two or three times before recording them. There's some rawness. You can hear it in the drums.

Ament on the song:

That was kind of a last-minute deal. We went out and started playing it. Matt came in and we knocked it out in less than an hour. Ed, within a few days, had lyrics for it. I walked in one day and all the sudden the lyrics were over it!

== Lyrics ==
"1/2 Full" references the Pearl Jam song "Porch" with the lyrics "There's ain't gonna be/No middle anymore/It's been said before." At the band's February 23, 2003 concert in Perth, Australia, at the Burswood Dome, Vedder said, "Alright, this next song's off the last record and it's all about nature talking to you when you... when you spend time in it, maybe when there's no other humans around nature keeps you company, and... this is what it said to us."

== Reception ==
Seattle Weekly called "1/2 Full" a "brawny, old-school blues-rocker."

== Music video ==
The music video for "1/2 Full" was directed by James Frost. The video was filmed at Seattle's Chop Suey club in September 2002. The video consists of a filmed live performance of the band rather than a conceptual video. It was one of five videos shot at the club to promote Riot Act (including "I Am Mine", "Save You", "Love Boat Captain", and "Thumbing My Way"). Up to that point the band had not made any music videos since 1998's "Do the Evolution." The video was released in late 2002.

== Live performances ==
"1/2 Full" was first performed live at the band's December 5, 2002 concert in Seattle at The Showbox. Live performances of "1/2 Full" can be found on various official bootlegs and the live album Live at Easy Street. Performances of the song are also included on the DVDs Live at the Showbox and Live at the Garden.
