= Live at Easy Street =

Live album (EP) by Pearl Jam
- Released: June 20, 2006
- Recorded: April 29, 2005, Easy Street Records, Seattle, Washington
- Genre: Alternative rock
- Length: 27:30
- Language: English
- Label: J

Pearl Jam live albums chronology
Live in NYC 12/31/92 (2006)	Live at Easy Street (2006)	11/30/93 – Las Vegas, Nevada (2006)

Professional ratings
Review scores
Source	Rating
Rolling Stone	3.5/5 stars

Live at Easy Street is a live EP by the American alternative rock band Pearl Jam that includes songs taken from a surprise in-store performance at Easy Street Records in West Seattle on April 29, 2005. The EP was released on vinyl to celebrate Record Store Day on April 13, 2019.

== Overview ==
Pearl Jam performed a sixteen song set on April 29, 2005 at Easy Street Records in Seattle, Washington in support of the Coalition of Independent Music Stores, however only seven of those songs are included on this release. The album was released exclusively to independent record stores on June 20, 2006 through J Records. The album contains covers of the Avengers' "American in Me", the Dead Kennedys' "Bleed for Me", and X's "The New World", the latter of which features X's John Doe.

Easy Street Records, located in West Seattle, is frequented by members of the band including vocalist Eddie Vedder and guitarist Mike McCready. The person seated in the lower right corner of the cover is Adam Tutty, manager of Easy Street Records and an acquaintance of the band.

Rolling Stone staff writer David Fricke gave the album three and a half out of five stars, saying, "Here's a good reason why cool bricks-and-mortar record shops still matter: seven songs cut live and hot in front of fans and customers at Easy Street Records in Pearl Jam's hometown of Seattle, then released through indie stores and priced to move."

== Track listing ==
1. "Intro" – 0:25
2. "½ Full" (Jeff Ament, Eddie Vedder) – 4:55
3. "Lukin" (Vedder) – 1:00
4. "American in Me" (Penelope Houston) – 2:04
5. "Save You" (Ament, Matt Cameron, Stone Gossard, Mike McCready, Vedder) – 3:43
6. "Bleed for Me" (Dead Kennedys) – 4:12
7. "The New World" (Exene Cervenka, John Doe) (with John Doe) – 3:56
8. "Porch" (Vedder) – 7:16

=== Original setlist ===
The following is the complete list of songs that were performed by Pearl Jam at the original concert:

1. "½ Full"
2. "Corduroy"
3. "Lukin"
4. "American in Me"
5. "State of Love and Trust"
6. "Down"
7. "Sad"
8. "Elderly Woman Behind the Counter in a Small Town"
9. "Crapshoot"
  - An early version of "Comatose" from the band's 2006 album, Pearl Jam
10. "Spin the Black Circle"
11. "Even Flow"
12. "Save You"
13. "Bleed For Me"
14. "The New World" (with John Doe)
15. "Fuckin' Up"
16. "Porch"

=== Soundcheck ===
The following is the complete list of songs that were soundchecked by Pearl Jam earlier in the day before the concert.

1. "Sad"
2. "The New World"
3. "Breakerfall"/"Wash" (riffs only)
4. "Breakerfall" (take one)
5. "Breakerfall" (take two)
6. "Crapshoot"
7. "Elderly Woman Behind the Counter in a Small Town"
8. "I Got You" (riffs only)
9. "Whipping"
10. "Corduroy" (riffs only)

== Personnel ==
Pearl Jam

- Jeff Ament – bass guitar
- Matt Cameron – drums
- Stone Gossard – guitars
- Mike McCready – guitars
- Eddie Vedder – vocals, guitars

Additional musicians and production

- John Burton – mixing
- John Doe – vocals on "The New World"
- Brett Eliason – recording
- Bootsy Holler – photos
- Brad Klausen – design and layout
- RFI CD Mastering, Seattle, Washington – mastering
