= Lost Dogs (album) =

Compilation album by Pearl Jam
- Released: November 11, 2003
- Recorded: 1991–2003
- Genres: Alternative rock; grunge
- Length: 111:55
- Label: Epic
- Producers: Tchad Blake, Stone Gossard, Adam Kasper, Brendan O'Brien, Rick Parashar, Pearl Jam, Eddie Vedder, Westwood One Broadcast

Pearl Jam compilations chronology
Lost Dogs (2003)	Rearviewmirror (Greatest Hits 1991–2003) (2004)

Lost Dogs is a two-disc compilation album by the American alternative rock band Pearl Jam, released on November 11, 2003 through Epic Records. The album has been certified gold by the RIAA in the United States.

== Overview ==
Lost Dogs is a double-disc collection of B-sides and other released and unreleased rarities. Lost Dogs sold 89,500 copies in its first week of release and debuted at number fifteen on the Billboard 200 chart. Lost Dogs has been certified gold by the RIAA.

A number of songs included on Lost Dogs differ from the originally released versions, including "Alone", "U", "Wash" and "Dirty Frank". "Sad" was originally titled "Letter to the Dead". The version of "Alone" (an outtake from Ten) appearing here has new vocals, slightly different lyrics and a shortened length compared to the B-side version. "Footsteps" features harmonica not appearing in the original single version, while its music was also utilized for "Times of Trouble" by Temple of the Dog.

The album includes the hidden track "4/20/02" at the end of disc two, a tribute to Alice in Chains frontman Layne Staley. It was written by vocalist Eddie Vedder during the recording sessions for Riot Act on the day that he heard the news of Staley's death. The song features only Vedder singing and playing the guitar in a ukulele-inspired tuning. According to Vedder, the reason why it was not included on Riot Act was that the band already had too many songs. According to guitarist Mike McCready, the reason the song was only featured as a hidden track on Lost Dogs is because Vedder "wouldn't want it to be exploitative".

"Angel" (from the 1993 fan club Christmas single) was supposed to appear on disc two, but was deleted before release. There is still mention of it on the "lost dogs" flyers on the back cover. Besides "Angel", some notable omissions from the album include various songs only available on other fan club Christmas singles by the band, "I Got Id" and "Long Road" from the Merkin Ball EP, and "Leatherman" from the "Given to Fly" single.

The song "Bee Girl" is a tribute to Heather DeLoach, who appeared in a bee costume in the music video for "No Rain" by Blind Melon.

== Reception ==
Professional ratings
Review scores
Source	Rating
AllMusic	4.5/5 stars
Blender	4/5 stars
Entertainment Weekly	B
The Guardian	4/5 stars
The New York Times	(favorable)
Rolling Stone	3/5 stars
Spin	3.5/5 stars

Lost Dogs was generally well-received by music critics upon its initial release. AllMusic staff writer Stephen Thomas Erlewine gave the album four and a half out of five stars. He said, "This is further proof that Pearl Jam consciously turned away from the big, anthemic sound and spirit that won them a mass audience with Ten—they still had the songs and sound, they just chose to bury it. Lost Dogs crackles with that passion and it has another advantage: unlike most of Pearl Jam's albums, it's a fun, compulsive listen. More than any other album in its catalog, Lost Dogs captures what Pearl Jam stood for and what it felt like at their peak."

Rolling Stone staff writer David Fricke gave the album three out of five stars, saying that "for an album of odds 'n' sods, Lost Dogs sure sounds a lot like a pack of hits." In a review for Spin, music critic Will Hermes compared it to other compilations by claiming that "Unlike most collections of its kind, Dogs seems motivated more by good sense than greed; even the song about saving the whales is kinda kicky."

== Track listing ==
Disc one
No.	Title	Lyrics	Music	Length
1.	"All Night" (No Code outtake)	Eddie Vedder	Jack Irons; Jeff Ament; Stone Gossard; Mike McCready; Vedder	3:22
2.	"Sad" (Binaural outtake)	Vedder	Vedder	3:39
3.	"Down" (B-side to "I Am Mine")	Vedder	McCready; Gossard	3:15
4.	"Hitchhiker" (Binaural outtake)	Vedder	Vedder	3:17
5.	"Don't Gimme No Lip" (No Code outtake)	Gossard	Gossard	2:35
6.	"Alone" (alternate version of B-side to "Go")	Vedder	Vedder; Gossard; Ament; McCready; Dave Abbruzzese	3:11
7.	"In the Moonlight" (Binaural outtake)	Matt Cameron	Cameron	3:07
8.	"Education" (Binaural outtake)	Vedder	Vedder	2:46
9.	"Black, Red, Yellow" (alternate version of B-side to "Hail, Hail")	Vedder	Vedder	3:26
10.	"You" (alternate version of B-side to "Wishlist")	Vedder	Vedder	2:53
11.	"Leaving Here" (from Home Alive: The Art of Self Defense)	Holland–Dozier–Holland	Holland–Dozier–Holland	2:51
12.	"Gremmie Out of Control" (from MOM: Music for Our Mother Ocean)	Jimmie Haskell	Haskell	2:25
13.	"Whale Song" (from MOM III: Music for Our Mother Ocean)	Irons	Irons	3:35
14.	"Undone" (B-side to "I Am Mine")	Vedder	Vedder	3:10
15.	"Hold On" (Ten outtake)	Vedder	Gossard	4:22
16.	"Yellow Ledbetter" (B-side to "Jeremy")	Vedder	McCready; Ament	5:00

Disc two
No.	Title	Lyrics	Music	Length
1.	"Fatal" (Binaural outtake)	Gossard	Gossard	3:39
2.	"Other Side" (B-side to "Save You")	Ament	Ament	4:04
3.	"Hard to Imagine" (alternate version of track from Chicago Cab soundtrack)	Vedder	Gossard	4:35
4.	"Footsteps" (alternate version of B-side to "Jeremy")	Vedder	Gossard	3:54
5.	"Wash" (alternate version of B-side to "Alive")	Vedder	Gossard; Ament; McCready; Dave Krusen	3:48
6.	"Dead Man" (B-side to "Off He Goes")	Vedder	Vedder	4:16
7.	"Strangest Tribe" (from 1999 fan club Christmas single)	Gossard	Gossard	3:49
8.	"Drifting" (alternate version of track from 1999 fan club Christmas single)	Vedder	Vedder	2:53
9.	"Let Me Sleep" (from 1991 fan club Christmas single)	Vedder; McCready	Vedder; McCready	2:59
10.	"Last Kiss" (from 1998 fan club Christmas single)	Wayne Cochran	Cochran	3:17
11.	"Sweet Lew" (Binaural outtake)	Ament	Ament	2:11
12.	"Dirty Frank" (alternate version of B-side to "Even Flow")	Vedder	Gossard; Ament; McCready; Abbruzzese	5:42
13.	"Brother" (Ten outtake)	—	Gossard	3:47
14.	"Bee Girl" (live on Rockline, October 18, 1993) "4/20/02" (hidden track)	Vedder	Ament	9:55

== Personnel ==
=== Pearl Jam ===
- Eddie Vedder – vocals, guitar, harmonica, production, additional Polaroid photography
- Jeff Ament – bass guitar, guitar, vocals, cover concept, cover/back photos
- Stone Gossard – guitar, vocals, bass guitar, percussion, production
- Mike McCready – guitar, piano
- Dave Krusen – drums, slit drum
- Dave Abbruzzese – drums
- Jack Irons – drums, guitar, vocals, percussion
- Matt Cameron – drums, percussion, guitar

=== Additional musicians and production ===
- Matt Bayles – mixing, engineering
- Tchad Blake – production, mixing, engineering, Wurlitzer
- Ed Brooks – mixing, engineering
- Nick DiDia – engineering
- Brett Eliason – mixing, engineering
- Mitchell Froom – keys
- Adam Kasper – production, mixing, engineering
- Brad Klausen – layout and design
- Brendan O'Brien – production, mixing, guitar
- Rick Parashar – production, mixing, engineering
- Pearl Jam – production
- Westwood One Broadcast – production

== Charts ==
Chart performance for Lost Dogs
Chart (2003)	Peak position
Australian Albums (ARIA)	19
Austrian Albums (Ö3 Austria)	70
Belgian Albums (Ultratop Flanders)	50
Canadian Albums (Billboard)	70
Dutch Albums (Album Top 100)	75
French Albums (SNEP)	93
German Albums (Offizielle Top 100)	64
Irish Albums (IRMA)	63
Italian Albums (FIMI)	20
New Zealand Albums (RMNZ)	18
Norwegian Albums (VG-lista)	33
Portuguese Albums (AFP)	7
Scottish Albums (Official Charts)	72
Swedish Albums (Sverigetopplistan)	60
Swiss Albums (Schweizer Hitparade)	61
UK Albums (Official Charts)	91
US Billboard 200	15

== Certifications ==
Certifications for Lost Dogs
Region	Certification	Certified units/sales
Australia (ARIA)	Gold	35,000^{^}
Canada (Music Canada)	Gold	50,000^{^}
New Zealand (RMNZ)	Gold	7,500^{^}
United States (RIAA)	Gold	500,000^{^}
^{^} Shipments figures based on certification alone.
