= Riot Act (album) =

- CD releases

Studio album by Pearl Jam
- Released: November 12, 2002
- Recorded: February and May 2002
- Studios: Studio X, Seattle, Washington; Space, Seattle, Washington
- Genres: Art rock; alternative rock
- Length: 54:15
- Label: Epic
- Producers: Adam Kasper; Pearl Jam

Pearl Jam chronology
Binaural (2000)	Riot Act (2002)	Pearl Jam (2006)

Singles from Riot Act
- 1. "I Am Mine" Released: October 8, 2002; 2. "Save You" Released: February 11, 2003; 3. "Love Boat Captain" Released: February 24, 2003

Riot Act is the seventh studio album by American rock band Pearl Jam, released November 12, 2002, through Epic Records. Following a full-scale tour in support of their previous album, Binaural (2000), Pearl Jam took a year-long break. The band reconvened in the beginning of 2002 and commenced work on a new album. The music on the album was diverse, including songs influenced by folk, art rock and experimental rock. The lyrics deal with mortality and existentialism, with influence from both the political climate after the September 11 attacks and the accidental death of nine fans during Pearl Jam's performance at the 2000 Roskilde Festival.

The band supported the album with a politically motivated concert tour in 2003. Riot Act was the band's last album of all-new material for Epic. The album received mostly positive reviews, and has been certified gold by the RIAA in the United States.

== Recording ==
Producer Adam Kasper was brought in to work with the band on its seventh album. Kasper had engineered other Pearl Jam albums, and was brought to produce following a suggestion by drummer Matt Cameron, who worked with Kasper on his previous groups Wellwater Conspiracy and Soundgarden. Riot Act was recorded in two sessions in February 2002 and April 2002 at Studio X in Seattle. The album was mixed by Brendan O'Brien at Studio X.

Similar to the process for Yield and Binaural, band members worked on material individually before starting the recording sessions together. According to Cameron, everyone in the band had "four or five" ideas coming into the sessions, and there was "a lot to just kind of weed through and work on." The band often recorded material intended to be demo recordings, but lead vocalist Eddie Vedder would come along and record his vocals afterwards, stating, "I just sang it, that's the take." Regarding the creative process, guitarist Stone Gossard said that while playing alone "the anal-retentive side of you goes, 'I think I could play better.'", but when reuniting "the entire band goes 'No, it's great as it is,' then you just get in the mood and embrace it." Gossard stated that "the process of letting go is constant in this band", adding that bandmembers would arrive with "a clear idea of what a song is going to be" but eschew for other musical ideas while discussing the song with the group. Riot Act was the first Pearl Jam album to feature Kenneth "Boom" Gaspar on keyboards, most notably on the song "Love Boat Captain". According to Gaspar, the song initially developed out of a jam session he had with Vedder in Hawaii shortly after the two first met. When they were done, Vedder asked Gaspar if he was "ready to go to Seattle." According to Gossard, bringing in Gaspar was about being "open to new things", while Vedder stated Gaspar "was able to find his place" and fit in easily with the band dynamics. Guitarist Mike McCready said that he had always wanted the band to feature keyboards.

McCready described the recording environment as "a pretty positive one" and "very intense and spiritual." Cameron said that producer Adam Kasper created a "really relaxed" atmosphere and that the band was able to complete lot of material in a short amount of time. Vedder set up his typewriter in a corner of the studio and would write lyrics as the band members played their material. Most of the album was recorded live, with Cameron describing the album as "our anti-Pro Tools record." Gossard said that the band fed off Cameron's playing as well as Vedder's excitement about the recording process.

== Music and lyrics ==
Riot Act features a diverse sound, including folk-based and experimental songs. Stephen Thomas Erlewine of AllMusic said "Riot Act is the album that Pearl Jam has been wanting to make since Vitalogy—a muscular art rock record, one that still hits hard but that's filled with ragged edges and odd detours." Gossard said "Riot Act really seems to showcase all of our thing. There's the simple rock songs we could have written in the earlier era, but it covers all the different times and dynamics we've had and still holds together." The musical experiments led several songs on the album to use alternate tunings, including "You Are", "All or None" and "Bu$hleaguer".

"I Am Mine"
A sample of "I Am Mine", the first single released from the album. The song has a warm, acoustic sound and lyrics written by Vedder about personal freedom.

"Save You"
A sample of "Save You", the second single released from the album. The song is heavily influenced by garage rock.

The lyrics on Riot Act were more direct than on preceding records, in response to the political climate after the September 11 attacks. Bassist Jeff Ament commented that he felt that love was a major theme of the album, and Vedder tried to convey themes such as love, loss and struggle to make a difference because of the difficulty in leading with events such as the September 11 attacks and the much more personal tragedy of the accidental deaths of nine fans during Pearl Jam's performance at the 2000 Roskilde Festival – "You start feeling like, 'What do I have to say? What is my opinion?' Then I realized I did have an opinion. Not only did I have one, but I felt like it was formed by processing a lot of information and having good influences. Ament also told that "I think the time's right to turn our voice up a bit... And Ed did it in a great way, with humour and a mystical, magical approach. It isn't just, 'We're pissed off, and fuck you! Riot! Anarchy!' Cos I don't think that's the method. At least at this point." Vedder, however, said, "I have to admit this record came out a bit one-sided. But I think we, as a country, need to understand why we're involved in the Middle East. This hollow patriotism frightens me." The singer added that the Riot Act lyrics "represent[ed] my state of mind these days. I'm optimistic yet disillusioned, hopeful yet frustrated." Several songs on the album were inspired by Roskilde tragedy, with the album's first single, "I Am Mine", written by Vedder in 2000 in a hotel room before the band's first show after Roskilde, and "Love Boat Captain" including a brief lyrical reference ("Lost nine friends we'll never know... two years ago today"). Regarding the time period when the lyrics were being written, Vedder said, "There's been a lot of mortality...It's a weird time to be writing. Roskilde changed the shape of us as people, and our filter for seeing the world changed."

A few songs feature lyrical collaborations between Vedder and other members of the group: one with Ament ("Ghost"), one with Cameron ("You Are") and two with Gossard ("Bu$hleaguer" and "All or None"). Sole lyrical contributions from band members other than Vedder include Cameron with "Get Right" and Ament with "Help, Help" The album's lyrics tackle existential matters ("Love Boat Captain", "Cropduster" and "I Am Mine"), as well as social and political concerns ("Green Disease", "Bu$hleaguer" and "1/2 Full"). The lyrics of "Save You" represent the anger felt by anyone watching a close friend waste away his or her life. Regarding "Love Boat Captain", Vedder said, "Love is one resource that corporations aren't going to be able to monopolize." Vedder said that "Cropduster" is "about man's giant ego, that he's the most important thing on the planet." Regarding "Green Disease", Vedder stated he was "mystified" at corporate-management salaries and "how someone can justify taking that much at the cost of other people's livelihoods." "Bu$hleaguer" is a satirical commentary on President George W. Bush.

== Packaging ==
The album's cover art, photographed by Ament, features two skeletons wearing crowns, suggesting the possibility that the two represent a king and a queen. The metal figurines were forged by blacksmith Kelly Gilliam. According to Ament, the band had trouble coming up with a name for the album. After the artwork had been finalized and the tracks were sequenced, the band spent weeks trying to come up with a title. Vedder suggested Riot Act, and the band members went with it as they were tired with trying to come up with a title. McCready stated that the title has no real significance. He said, "I guess we were trying to come up with a title that reflected some of the music on the record, which we thought was urgent-sounding and kind of loud...It just seemed to fit." Ament implied that the title has to do with "getting your act together."

== Tour ==
Pearl Jam promoted the album with tours in Australia, Japan, and North America in 2003. The tours were the band's first with keyboardist Boom Gaspar. The two legs of the North American tour focused on the Midwestern United States, the East Coast, and the West Coast, and had more concerts in arenas. The trauma of Roskilde led the tour to lack performances on festivals and open floor venues.

The band received much publicity for its energetic politically charged performances during the tour. At many shows during the 2003 North American tour, Vedder performed "Bu$hleaguer" with a rubber mask of George W. Bush, wearing it at the beginning of the song and then hanging it on a mic stand to allow him to sing. The band made news when it was reported that several fans left after Vedder had "impaled" the Bush mask on his mic stand at the band's show of April 1, 2003, in Denver, Colorado show at the Pepsi Center. Following a performance of the song at Pearl Jam's show of April 30, 2003, in Uniondale, New York, at the Nassau Coliseum, the band was met with boos from the crowd and chants of "U-S-A." Vedder responded by defending his right to free speech and the band followed with a performance of the Clash's "Know Your Rights". The song "Arc" was performed by Vedder at nine shows during the second North American leg of the tour as a tribute to the victims of the Roskilde disaster. The concerts were documented by a long series of official bootlegs, all of which were available through the band's official website, and six of which were released in record stores: Perth, Tokyo, State College, Pennsylvania, two shows from Madison Square Garden, and Mansfield, Massachusetts. Two concerts became DVDs, the Seattle one being issued as Live at the Showbox, and the first of two shows at Madison Square Garden was released as the Live at the Garden DVD. Pearl Jam also supported the album's material at a series of political rallies and benefit concerts while preparing for its eighth studio album.

== Release and reception ==
=== Commercial performance ===
Riot Act reached number five in the U.S. on the Billboard 200 album chart, with 166,000 copies sold in its first week of release. The album would end up selling only 575,000 copies in the United States according to Nielsen SoundScan, short of the 850,000 sold by predecessor Binaural. Riot Act has been certified gold by the RIAA. It became the band's first album not to chart in the top two on the Billboard 200. The international response to Riot Act was more positive. The album topped the charts in Australia, where it went platinum and ended among the best-selling records of the year in both 2002 and 2003. Riot Act also went to number two in both Italy, and New Zealand, three in Norway, and number four in Canada.

Three singles were released from Riot Act. Lead single "I Am Mine" entered the Billboard Hot 100 at number 43, and reached number six on the Modern rock charts. While "Save You" was released as the second single for North America, "Love Boat Captain" was the second single for international markets. "Save You" did not chart on the Hot 100, but it did place on the Mainstream Rock and Modern Rock charts. Music videos for several songs from the album, including "I Am Mine", "Save You", "Love Boat Captain", "Thumbing My Way", and "1/2 Full", were filmed at Seattle's Chop Suey club in September 2002.

"All or None" experienced a surge in popularity following its inclusion in "Left Behind", the seventh episode of the HBO series The Last of Us, with Spotify streams increasing by over 5,000% in the first 24 hours after the episode's release.

=== Critical response ===
Professional ratings
Review scores
Source	Rating
AllMusic	4/5 stars
Entertainment Weekly	B
The Guardian	2/5 stars
The New York Times	(mixed)
NME	4/5 stars
Pitchfork	4.9/10
Q	3/5 stars
Robert Christgau	(1-star Honorable Mention)
Rolling Stone	3/5 stars
Spin	7/10

Riot Act received favorable reviews from music critics according to Metacritic, where it holds a 73 after 20 reviews. NME gave Riot Act an eight out of ten. Reviewer Louis Pattison stated that "Riot Act is the sound of a band entering a powerful middle-age. They still deserve your attention." AllMusic staff writer Stephen Thomas Erlewine gave the album four out of five stars, saying "given several plays, this does indeed seem like the richest record Pearl Jam has made in a long time." Spin gave the album seven out of ten stars. The review said, "Pearl Jam's seventh studio album balances emotive bombast with a taut-sweaty hard-rock attack." Critic Robert Christgau described Pearl Jam on the album as "masters of their own audio, with soft spots where their emotions can go." Rolling Stone staff writer Keith Harris gave the album three out of five stars, saying that "like Neil Young at his most deliberately despondent, Pearl Jam sound purposefully tired." Chris Willman of Entertainment Weekly gave the album a B, saying that Vedder's lyrics "rarely cohere", and that "too few of the tense rhythmic setups build to the kind of...catharsis that would be something to Riot home about." Q gave the album three out of five stars. The review called the album "An adult rock record in which nuance succeeds over bombast."

Hugo Lindgren of The New York Times stated that the "record sounds as if it were made to slip quietly into the marketplace, connect with the faithful and leave everyone else alone", and that "there's no catchy single, and not even the slightest echo of anything else happening in pop music now." He added that the "band's grooves still sound taut, emotive and world-class." Adam Sweeting of The Guardian gave the album two out of five stars. In the review he stated that "Riot Act isn't one thing or the other: tracks such as "Ghost" or "Get Right" gesture towards hard rock without really putting the hammer down, while a more reflective piece like "All or None" doesn't exploit its own possibilities." Sweeting observed, "On full, Pearl Jam sound like Stillwater, Cameron Crowe's fictional 1970s second-raters from his film Almost Famous." Kyle Reiter of Pitchfork said that the album "meanders from one song to the next with an overwhelming insipidness", and stated that it "[brings] them ever closer to homogenous bar-band territory."

== Track listing ==
All lyrics are written by Eddie Vedder, except where noted.

Riot Act track listing
No.	Title	Lyrics	Music	Length
1.	"Can't Keep"		Vedder	3:39
2.	"Save You"		Mike McCready, Jeff Ament, Matt Cameron, Stone Gossard, Vedder	3:50
3.	"Love Boat Captain"		Vedder, Boom Gaspar	4:36
4.	"Cropduster"		Cameron	3:51
5.	"Ghost"	Ament, Vedder	Ament	3:15
6.	"I Am Mine"		Vedder	3:35
7.	"Thumbing My Way"		Vedder	4:10
8.	"You Are"	Cameron, Vedder	Cameron	4:30
9.	"Get Right"	Cameron	Cameron	2:38
10.	"Green Disease"		Vedder	2:41
11.	"Help Help"	Ament	Ament	3:35
12.	"Bu$hleaguer"	Vedder, Gossard	Gossard	3:57
13.	"½ Full"		Ament	4:10
14.	"Arc"		Vedder	1:05
15.	"All or None"	Gossard, Vedder	Gossard	4:37
Total length:				54:15

=== Outtakes ===
The album's singles featured three B-sides from the Riot Act recording sessions that were not included on the album: "Down", "Undone" and "Other Side". "Down" and "Undone" were B-sides on the "I Am Mine" single, and "Other Side" was featured on the "Save You" and "Love Boat Captain" singles. All three were included on the 2003 Lost Dogs collection of rarities, although "Undone" appeared in a slightly different form. McCready said that "Down" came out lighter than intended, and was ultimately left off Riot Act because it did not fit with the other songs on the album. Also recorded during the sessions was "4/20/02", a song honoring Alice in Chains frontman Layne Staley that Vedder wrote the day that he heard the news of Staley's death. According to Vedder, "4/20/02" wasn't included on Riot Act because the band already had too many songs, but it was included on Lost Dogs, albeit in the form of a hidden track. A recording of "Severed Hand", a song that appeared on the band's next studio album Pearl Jam, was attempted during the recording sessions; however the band only spent a few hours on the song before it was shelved. "Last Soldier", a live version of which was recorded at the 2001 Bridge School Benefit and included on the band's 2001 fan club Christmas single, was written by McCready and Vedder in response to the aftermath of the events of September 11, 2001. McCready said the band played around with the song, but never seriously considered recording it for Riot Act.

== Personnel ==
Pearl Jam

- Eddie Vedder – vocals, guitar; credited as "ev" for typist
- Jeff Ament – bass guitar, cover/inside photos; credited as "Al Nostreet" for album concept
- Matt Cameron – drums, percussion, rhythm guitar on "You Are"
- Stone Gossard – guitar
- Mike McCready – guitar

Additional musicians and production

- John Burton – additional engineering
- Danny Clinch – additional inside photography
- Boom Gaspar – Hammond B3, Fender Rhodes
- Kenny Gilliam – forged metal figures
- Sam Hofstedt – engineering
- Adam Kasper – production, recording, piano
- Gregg Keplinger – drum technician
- Brad Klausen – LBC illustration, layout and design
- Brendan O'Brien – mixing
- Pearl Jam – production
- George Webb – guitar technician

== Charts and certifications ==
=== Weekly charts ===
Weekly chart performance for Riot Act
Chart (2002)	Peak position
Australian Albums (ARIA)	1
Austrian Albums (Ö3 Austria)	24
Belgian Albums (Ultratop Flanders)	12
Belgian Albums (Ultratop Wallonia)	20
Canadian Albums (Billboard)	4
Danish Albums (Hitlisten)	16
Dutch Albums (Album Top 100)	23
Finnish Albums (Suomen virallinen lista)	21
French Albums (SNEP)	30
German Albums (Offizielle Top 100)	13
Irish Albums (IRMA)	9
Italian Albums (FIMI)	2
Japanese Albums (Oricon)	35
New Zealand Albums (RMNZ)	2
Norwegian Albums (VG-lista)	3
Polish Albums (OLiS)	6
Portuguese Albums (AFP)	3
Scottish Albums (Official Charts)	23
Spanish Albums (AFYVE)	20
Swedish Albums (Sverigetopplistan)	13
Swiss Albums (Schweizer Hitparade)	13
UK Albums (Official Charts)	34
UK Rock & Metal Albums (Official Charts)	3
US Billboard 200	5
US Top Internet Albums (Billboard)	2

=== Year-end charts ===
Year-end chart performance for Riot Act
Chart (2002)	Position
Australian Albums (ARIA)	62
Canadian Albums (Nielsen SoundScan)	125
Canadian Alternative Albums (Nielsen SoundScan)	38
Canadian Metal Albums (Nielsen SoundScan)	18

=== Certifications ===
Certifications for Riot Act
Region	Certification	Certified units/sales
Australia (ARIA)	Platinum	70,000^{^}
Brazil (Pro-Música Brasil)	Gold	50,000^{*}
Canada (Music Canada)	Platinum	100,000^{^}
New Zealand (RMNZ)	Gold	7,500^{^}
United Kingdom (BPI)	Silver	60,000^{^}
United States (RIAA)	Gold	500,000^{^}
^{*} Sales figures based on certification alone.^{^} Shipments figures based on certification alone.
