= Love Boat Captain =

2003 single by Pearl Jam

Single by Pearl Jam

from the album Riot Act
- B-side: "Love Boat Captain" (live); "Other Side"
- Released: February 24, 2003
- Studio: Studio X (Seattle, Washington)
- Length: 4:36
- Label: Epic
- Songwriters: Eddie Vedder; Boom Gaspar
- Lyricist: Eddie Vedder
- Producers: Adam Kasper; Pearl Jam

Pearl Jam singles chronology
"Save You" (2003)	"Love Boat Captain" (2003)	"Man of the Hour" (2003)

Music video
- "Love Boat Captain" on YouTube

"Love Boat Captain" is a song by the American rock band Pearl Jam. Featuring lyrics written by vocalist Eddie Vedder and music co-written by Vedder and keyboardist Boom Gaspar, "Love Boat Captain" was released on February 24, 2003, as a single from the band's seventh studio album, Riot Act (2002). It became a top-20 hit in Canada and Portugal. The song was not released in the United States, where "Save You" was issued instead.

== Origin and recording ==
"Love Boat Captain" features lyrics written by vocalist Eddie Vedder and music co-written by Vedder and keyboardist Boom Gaspar. According to Gaspar, the song initially developed out of a jam session he had with Vedder shortly after the two first met in Hawaii. He added, "He had a guitar. I had a keyboard. It was a small set-up. And we wrote." When they were done, Vedder asked Gaspar if he was "ready to go to Seattle." Vedder on the song:

I had a little recording setup for when I wanted to get away and do some writing. He just showed up and we started playing. That night we wrote what turned into "Love Boat Captain". Within an hour, we had this thing we put on the stereo and played it loud. It was probably about an 11-minute version at that point.

Bassist Jeff Ament said, "The demo to that was called "Boom B3". We played a version of it, and then it got re-arranged." Drummer Matt Cameron on the song:

There weren't any lyrics when we tracked it, so we did what we thought would be a good, tight instrumental version that would later have vocals on it. When we tracked it, I was like, "Huh? What's this?" It made no sense to me. But then when the vocals were added, it made perfect sense and it elevated the entire piece.

== Lyrics ==
The lyrics for "Love Boat Captain" tackle existential matters. "Love Boat Captain" references the 2000 Roskilde tragedy with the line "Lost nine friends we'll never know two years ago today". When "Love Boat Captain" is performed in concert, Vedder modifies the lyric to reflect the passage of time since the tragedy. There is also a reference to The Beatles' song "All You Need Is Love" with the lyrics "I know it's already been sung...can't be said enough/Love is all you need..all you need is love..."

When speaking about the song, Vedder stated:

It feels a little strange talking about love that openly, but if you can't do it now, when can you do it? Love is one resource that the corporations aren't going to be able to monopolize. Which means there's hope for us human beings yet.

When asked about the line, "The young can lose hope," Vedder said:

I was happy to get that line because I'm talking about people much older than us, people who are 70 or 80 and they've got attitudes that don't have the deep peaks and valleys as someone who in adolescence who is faced with some things and they go, "Fuck this, this sucks, how can we have any hope?" These are people who been through the invention of the horseless carriage to the car to the TV set and are dealing with the internet. How do they view it? It's almost with disdain. This is the wisdom they can't give away, that is what I'm talking about and that youth doesn't have that timeline beneath them. So they just see something in front of them and think there's no hope, no getting over it, what's the point and so on. They are also bombarded with information more than ever these days, and negativity and cynicism and I can understand why they would feel that way. But they don't have to. There really are positive actions that can be taken.

== Release and reception ==
The commercially released single for "Love Boat Captain" was exclusive to Australia, Canada, and Europe. While "Save You" was released as the second single for North America, "Love Boat Captain" was the second single for international markets. In Portugal, the song reached number eight, and in Canada, it peaked at number 16. "Love Boat Captain" also reached the top 30 in Australia and Italy.

Louis Pattison of NME called the song "a gorgeous example of Pearl Jam's gnostic expansiveness done right" and stated that it "[ranks] with Pearl Jam's best." Kyle Reiter of Pitchfork said, "The devastated lyrics of "Love Boat Captain"...are affecting, but the song itself is a standard rocker, which seems an odd choice to accompany Vedder's poetic remorse."

== Music video ==
The music video for "Love Boat Captain" was directed by James Frost. The video was filmed at Seattle, Washington's Chop Suey club in September 2002. The video consists of a filmed live performance of the band rather than a conceptual video. It was one of five videos shot at the club to promote Riot Act (including "I Am Mine", "Save You", "Thumbing My Way", and "1/2 Full"). Up to that point the band had not made any music videos since 1998's "Do the Evolution". The video was released in late 2002.

== Live performances ==
"Love Boat Captain" was first performed live at the band's September 23, 2002, concert in Chicago, Illinois at the House of Blues. Live performances of "Love Boat Captain" can be found on the "Love Boat Captain" single, various official bootlegs, and the Live at the Gorge 05/06 box set. Performances of the song are also included on the DVDs Live at the Showbox and Live at the Garden. The song is also featured during the closing credits of Immagine in Cornice.

== Track listing ==
All songs written by Boom Gaspar and Eddie Vedder, except where noted:

CD (Australia and Canada)

1. "Love Boat Captain" – 4:36
2. "Love Boat Captain" (live) – 4:50
  - Recorded live on December 6, 2002, at The Showbox in Seattle, Washington.
3. "Other Side" (Jeff Ament) – 4:03

'CD (Europe)

1. "Love Boat Captain" – 4:36
2. "Other Side" (Ament) – 4:03

CD (Enhanced) (Europe)

1. "Love Boat Captain" – 4:36
2. "Love Boat Captain" (live) – 4:50
  - Recorded live on December 6, 2002, at The Showbox in Seattle, Washington.
3. "Other Side" (Ament) – 4:03
4. "Love Boat Captain" (video) – 4:43
  - Filmed live at the Chop Suey club in Seattle, Washington.

== Charts ==
Chart (2003)	Peak position
Australia (ARIA)	29
Canada (Nielsen SoundScan)	16
Italy (FIMI)	23
Portugal (AFP)	8
UK Singles (OCC)	110

== Release history ==
Region	Date	Format(s)	Label(s)	Ref.
Australia	February 24, 2003	CD	Epic	
Denmark	March 10, 2003	CD	Epic	
