= Live at the Gorge 05/06 =

Live album (box set) by Pearl Jam
- Released: June 26, 2007
- Recorded: September 1, 2005 and July 22–23, 2006, The Gorge Amphitheatre, George, Washington
- Genre: Alternative rock
- Length: 479:01
- Language: English
- Label: Rhino/Warner Music

Pearl Jam live albums chronology
11/30/93 – Las Vegas, Nevada (2006)	Live at the Gorge 05/06 (2007)	Live at Lollapalooza 2007 (2007)

Professional ratings
Review scores
Source	Rating
Allmusic	3.5/5 stars

Live at the Gorge 05/06 is a seven-disc live box set by the American alternative rock band Pearl Jam, released on June 26, 2007 through Rhino Entertainment/Warner Music Group. The box set documents the band's 2005 and 2006 shows at The Gorge Amphitheatre in George, Washington.

== Overview ==
The box set debuted at number 36 on the U.S. Billboard 200 chart with about 19,000 copies sold in its first week. As of April 2008, Live at the Gorge 05/06 has sold around 30,000 copies in the United States according to Nielsen SoundScan.

The band's show of September 1, 2005 took place at the beginning of its fall 2005 North American tour, while the two July 2006 shows concluded the second North American leg of the band's 2006 tour. Between the three concerts there were sixty-nine individual songs performed. The band's cover of Tom Petty's "I Won't Back Down" that was performed at the concert of September 1, 2005 was not originally released on the official bootleg for that show due to a DAT error. The track is present on this release. A mistake on the retail version of the packaging lists the show of September 1, 2005 as September 5, 2005.

Allmusic staff writer Jason Birchmeier gave the box set three and a half out of five stars. He said "it's a great package of shows that fans will want to hear, especially anyone who missed Pearl Jam on their sold-out summer 2006 tour."

== Track listing ==
=== September 1, 2005 ===
==== Disc one ====
1. "I Believe in Miracles" (Dee Dee Ramone, Daniel Rey) – 6:08
2. "Elderly Woman Behind the Counter in a Small Town" (Dave Abbruzzese, Jeff Ament, Stone Gossard, Mike McCready, Eddie Vedder) – 4:56
3. "Off He Goes" (Vedder) – 5:01
4. "Low Light" (Ament) – 4:06
5. "Man of the Hour" (Vedder) – 5:23
6. "I Am Mine" (Vedder) – 4:03
7. "Crazy Mary" (Victoria Williams) – 7:16
8. "Black" (Vedder, Gossard) – 7:07
9. "Hard to Imagine" (Gossard, Vedder) – 4:44

==== Disc two ====
1. "Given to Fly" (McCready, Vedder) – 3:50
2. "Last Exit" (Abbruzzese, Ament, Gossard, McCready, Vedder) – 2:28
3. "Save You" (Ament, Matt Cameron, Gossard, McCready, Vedder) – 3:44
4. "Do the Evolution" (Gossard, Vedder) – 3:55
5. "Alone" (Abbruzzese, Ament, Gossard, McCready, Vedder) – 2:43
6. "Sad" (Vedder) – 3:29
7. "Even Flow" (Vedder, Gossard) – 6:07
8. "Not for You" (Abbruzzese, Ament, Gossard, McCready, Vedder) – 6:45
9. "Corduroy" (Abbruzzese, Ament, Gossard, McCready, Vedder) – 4:40
10. "Dissident" (Abbruzzese, Ament, Gossard, McCready, Vedder) – 5:23
11. "MFC" (Vedder) – 2:35
12. "Undone" (Vedder) – 4:27
13. "Daughter" (Abbruzzese, Ament, Gossard, McCready, Vedder) – 6:34
14. "In My Tree" (Gossard, Jack Irons, Vedder) – 4:45
15. "State of Love and Trust" (Vedder, McCready, Ament) – 3:48
16. "Alive" (Vedder, Gossard) – 7:08
17. "Porch" (Vedder) – 7:29

==== Disc three ====
1. "Encore Break" – 1:40
2. "Love Boat Captain" (Boom Gaspar, Vedder) – 5:03
3. "Insignificance" (Vedder) – 4:43
4. "Better Man" (Vedder) – 5:24
5. "Rearviewmirror" (Abbruzzese, Ament, Gossard, McCready, Vedder) – 9:17
6. "I Won't Back Down" (Tom Petty) – 3:31
7. "Last Kiss" (Wayne Cochran) – 3:26
8. "Crown of Thorns" (Ament, Bruce Fairweather, Greg Gilmore, Gossard, Andrew Wood) – 6:36
9. "Blood" (Abbruzzese, Ament, Gossard, McCready, Vedder) – 5:26
10. "Yellow Ledbetter" (Ament, McCready, Vedder) – 5:18
11. "Baba O'Riley" (Pete Townshend) – 4:47

=== July 22, 2006 ===
==== Disc one ====
1. "Wash" (Ament, Gossard, Dave Krusen, McCready, Vedder) – 4:28
2. "Corduroy" (Abbruzzese, Ament, Gossard, McCready, Vedder) – 4:30
3. "Hail, Hail" (Gossard, Vedder, Ament, McCready) – 3:28
4. "World Wide Suicide" (Vedder) – 3:33
5. "Severed Hand" (Vedder) – 5:03
6. "Given to Fly" (McCready, Vedder) – 3:43
7. "Elderly Woman Behind the Counter in a Small Town" (Abbruzzese, Ament, Gossard, McCready, Vedder)– 3:17
8. "Even Flow" (Vedder, Gossard) – 7:50
9. "Down" (Gossard, McCready, Vedder) – 3:22
10. "I Am Mine" (Vedder) – 3:53
11. "Unemployable" (Cameron, McCready, Vedder) – 3:03
12. "Daughter" / "It's Ok" (Abbruzzese, Ament, Gossard, McCready, Vedder / Dead Moon) – 8:50
13. "Gone" (Vedder) – 4:17
14. "Black" (Vedder, Gossard) – 7:45
15. "Insignificance" (Vedder) – 4:37
16. "Life Wasted" (Gossard, Vedder) – 3:46
17. "Blood" (Abbruzzese, Ament, Gossard, McCready, Vedder) – 3:23

==== Disc two ====
1. "Encore Break" – 1:36
2. "Footsteps" (Gossard, Vedder) – 5:03
3. "Once" (Vedder, Gossard) – 3:23
4. "Alive" (Vedder, Gossard) – 5:56
5. "State of Love and Trust" (Vedder, McCready, Ament) – 3:26
6. "Crown of Thorns" (Ament, Fairweather, Gilmore, Gossard, Wood) – 6:06
7. "Leash" (Abbruzzese, Ament, Gossard, McCready, Vedder) – 2:59
8. "Porch" (Vedder) – 8:52
9. "Last Kiss" (Cochran) – 3:13
10. "Inside Job" (McCready, Vedder) – 6:30
11. "Go" (Abbruzzese, Ament, Gossard, McCready, Vedder) – 2:52
12. "Baba O'Riley" (Townshend) – 6:03
13. "Dirty Frank" (Abbruzzese, Ament, Gossard, McCready, Vedder) – 5:25
14. "Rockin' in the Free World" (Neil Young) – 9:10
15. "Yellow Ledbetter" / "Little Wing" / "The Star-Spangled Banner" (Ament, McCready, Vedder / Jimi Hendrix / Francis Scott Key, John Stafford Smith) – 9:13

=== July 23, 2006 ===
==== Disc one ====
1. "Severed Hand" (Vedder) – 4:50
2. "Corduroy" (Abbruzzese, Ament, Gossard, McCready, Vedder) – 4:36
3. "World Wide Suicide" (Vedder) – 3:26
4. "Gods' Dice" (Ament) – 2:25
5. "Animal" (Abbruzzese, Ament, Gossard, McCready, Vedder) – 2:34
6. "Do the Evolution" (Gossard, Vedder) – 5:05
7. "In Hiding" (Gossard, Vedder) – 4:38
8. "Green Disease" (Vedder) – 2:45
9. "Even Flow" (Vedder, Gossard) – 8:46
10. "Marker in the Sand" (McCready, Vedder) – 4:12
11. "Wasted Reprise" (Gossard, Vedder) – 1:04
12. "Better Man" / "Save It for Later" (Vedder / Roger Charlery, Andrew Cox, Everett Morton, David Steele, Dave Wakeling) – 7:35
13. "Army Reserve" (Ament, Vedder, Damien Echols) – 3:55
14. "Garden" (Vedder, Gossard, Ament) – 3:39
15. "Rats" (Abbruzzese, Ament, Gossard, McCready, Vedder) – 3:49
16. "Whipping" (Abbruzzese, Ament, Gossard, McCready, Vedder) – 2:37
17. "Jeremy" (Vedder, Ament) – 5:19
18. "Why Go" (Vedder, Ament) – 3:36

==== Disc two ====
1. "Encore Break" – 2:50
2. "I Won't Back Down" (Petty) – 3:08
3. "Life Wasted" (Gossard, Vedder) – 3:46
4. "Big Wave" (Ament, Vedder) – 3:19
5. "Satan's Bed" (Vedder, Gossard) – 3:02
6. "Spin the Black Circle" (Abbruzzese, Ament, Gossard, McCready, Vedder) – 2:59
7. "Alive" (Vedder, Gossard) – 7:03
8. "Given to Fly" (McCready, Vedder) – 3:53
9. "Little Wing" (Hendrix) – 5:12
10. "Crazy Mary" (Williams) – 8:08
11. "Comatose" (McCready, Gossard, Vedder) – 2:14
12. "Fuckin' Up" (Young) – 8:12
13. "Yellow Ledbetter" / "The Star-Spangled Banner" (Ament, McCready, Vedder / Key, Stafford Smith) – 7:14

== Personnel ==
Pearl Jam

- Jeff Ament – bass guitar
- Matt Cameron – drums
- Stone Gossard – guitars
- Mike McCready – guitars
- Eddie Vedder – vocals, guitars

Additional musicians and production

- Fernando Apodaca – director of cover images
- John Burton – recording, mixing assistance/Pro Tools engineering
- Brett Eliason – mixing
- Boom Gaspar – Hammond B3, Fender Rhodes
- Joe Gastwirt at Gastwirt Mastering – mastering
- Brad Klausen – design and layout
- Ananda Moorman – cover images
- Jason Mueller – artistic facilitator

== Chart positions ==
Chart (2007)	Position
Top Internet Albums	1
Croatian Albums Chart	6
Italian Albums Chart	30
US Billboard 200	36
New Zealand Albums Chart	36
Belgian Albums Chart (Vl)	43
Dutch Albums Chart	50
Irish Albums Chart	71
German Albums Chart	92
