= I Am Mine =

2002 single by Pearl Jam

Single by Pearl Jam

from the album Riot Act
- B-side: "Down"; "Undone"
- Released: October 8, 2002
- Studio: Studio X (Seattle, Washington)
- Genre: Folk rock
- Length: 3:35
- Label: Epic
- Songwriter: Eddie Vedder
- Producers: Adam Kasper; Pearl Jam

Pearl Jam singles chronology
"Light Years" (2000)	"I Am Mine" (2002)	"Save You" (2003)

Music video
- "I Am Mine" on YouTube

Audio sample
- file; help

"I Am Mine" is a song by American rock band Pearl Jam. Written by vocalist Eddie Vedder, "I Am Mine" was released on October 8, 2002, as the first single from the band's seventh studio album, Riot Act (2002). The song peaked at number six on the Billboard Modern Rock Tracks chart. The song was included on Pearl Jam's 2004 greatest hits album, rearviewmirror (Greatest Hits 1991–2003).

== Writing and recording ==
"I Am Mine" was written by vocalist Eddie Vedder in a hotel room near Virginia Beach, Virginia before the band's first show after the Roskilde tragedy in 2000. Vedder said that he wrote the song to "reassure myself that this is going to be all right."

Drummer Matt Cameron said of "I Am Mine":

It seems like it has all the elements this band is known for: strong lyrics, strong hook, and a good sense of melody. It wasn't a really tough decision to have that be the starting point for the record.

== Lyrics ==
The lyrics for "I Am Mine" tackle existential matters. At the band's April 8, 2003, show in New Orleans, Louisiana at the UNO Lakefront Arena, Vedder stated, "This song is about what's inside you. You own it, and you have the freedom for it to come out. It's allowed to come out." At the band's July 8, 2003, show in New York City at Madison Square Garden, Vedder stated, "This song's about personal safety, and the feeling of being secure, and even free."

== Release and reception ==
"I Am Mine" was released to several radio formats on September 23, 2002, while the physical release of the single was issued on October 8, 2002. The various versions of the "I Am Mine" single include the previously unreleased B-sides "Down" and "Undone", both of which can also be found on the compilation album Lost Dogs (2003), with the latter in an alternate version. "I Am Mine" was the most successful song from Riot Act on the American rock charts. The song peaked at number 43 on the Billboard Hot 100, number seven on the Billboard Mainstream Rock Tracks chart, and number six on the Billboard Modern Rock Tracks chart. In Canada, the song reached the top 10 on the Canadian Singles Chart. Outside North America, "I Am Mine" reached the top 30 in the United Kingdom and peaked at number 12 in Australia, where it was certified gold. The track reached the top 50 in New Zealand, the top 40 in Ireland, the top 30 in Sweden, the top 20 in Finland, and the top 10 in Italy, Norway, and Portugal.

== Music video ==
The music video for "I Am Mine" was directed by James Frost. The video was filmed at Seattle, Washington's Chop Suey club in September 2002. The video consists of a filmed live performance of the band rather than a conceptual video. It was one of five videos shot at the club to promote Riot Act (including "Save You", "Love Boat Captain", "Thumbing My Way", and "1/2 Full"). Up to that point, the band had not made any music videos since 1998's "Do the Evolution". The video was released in October 2002.

== Live performances ==
"I Am Mine" was first performed live at Neil Young's 2001 Bridge School Benefit. The band played this song when it appeared on the Late Show with David Letterman in November 2002 in support of Riot Act. Live performances of "I Am Mine" can be found on various official bootlegs and the Live at the Gorge 05/06 box set. Performances of the song are also included on the DVDs Live at the Showbox and Live at the Garden.

== Track listings ==
All songs were written by Eddie Vedder except where noted.

CD (US, Canada, and Europe) and 7-inch vinyl (Europe)

1. "I Am Mine"
2. "Down" (Stone Gossard, Mike McCready, Vedder)

7-inch vinyl (US)

A. "I Am Mine"
B. "Undone"

CD (Australia) and maxi-single (Europe)

1. "I Am Mine"
2. "Down" (Gossard, McCready, Vedder)
3. "Bushleaguer" (Gossard, Vedder)
4. "Undone"

CD (UK)

1. "I Am Mine" (album version) – 3:35
2. "Bushleaguer" (album version) (Gossard, Vedder) – 3:57
3. "Undone" – 3:08

== Charts ==
=== Weekly charts ===
Weekly chart performance for "I Am Mine"
Chart (2002)	Peak position
Australia (ARIA)	12
Canada (Nielsen SoundScan)	2
Europe (Eurochart Hot 100)	35
Finland (Suomen virallinen lista)	20
Germany (GfK)	60
Ireland (IRMA)	35
Italy (FIMI)	4
Netherlands (Single Top 100)	58
New Zealand (Recorded Music NZ)	48
Norway (VG-lista)	10
Portugal (AFP)	2
Scotland Singles (OCC)	25
Spain (Promusicae)	7
Sweden (Sverigetopplistan)	29
Switzerland (Schweizer Hitparade)	59
UK Singles (OCC)	26
UK Rock & Metal (OCC)	2
US Billboard Hot 100	43
US Adult Alternative Airplay (Billboard)	3
US Alternative Airplay (Billboard)	6
US Mainstream Rock (Billboard)	7

=== Year-end charts ===
Year-end chart performance for "I Am Mine"
Chart (2002)	Position
Canada (Nielsen SoundScan)	20
US Modern Rock Tracks (Billboard)	58
US Triple-A (Billboard)	39

== Certifications ==
Certifications and sales for "I Am Mine"
Region	Certification	Certified units/sales
Australia (ARIA)	Gold	35,000^{^}
Brazil (Pro-Música Brasil)	Gold	30,000^{‡}
^{^} Shipments figures based on certification alone.^{‡} Sales+streaming figures based on certification alone.

== Release history ==
Release dates and formats for "I Am Mine"
Region	Date	Format(s)	Label(s)	Ref.
United States	September 23, 2002	Mainstream rock; active rock; alternative; triple A radio	Epic	
United States	September 30, 2002	Hot adult contemporary radio	Epic	
United States	October 8, 2002	7-inch vinyl; CD	Epic	
Australia	October 21, 2002	CD	Epic	
Denmark	October 28, 2002	CD	Epic	
United Kingdom	October 28, 2002	7-inch vinyl; CD	Epic	
