= Thumbing My Way =

Song by Pearl Jam

from the album Riot Act
- Released: November 12, 2002
- Recorded: February–May 2002
- Studio: Studio X, Seattle, Washington
- Genre: Folk rock
- Length: 4:10
- Label: Epic
- Songwriter: Eddie Vedder
- Producers: Adam Kasper, Pearl Jam

"Thumbing My Way" is a song by the American rock band Pearl Jam. Written by vocalist Eddie Vedder, "Thumbing My Way" is the seventh track on the band's seventh studio album, Riot Act (2002).

== Origin and recording ==
"Thumbing My Way" was written by vocalist Eddie Vedder. Drummer Matt Cameron revealed to Vedder that he considers it the nicest chord progression Vedder has come up with. Vedder on the song:

"Thumbing My Way" was written real quick. There's something about writing real quickly that keeps the music in a nice pure state. You don't think of it as homework. You think, "Wow, that was a good half hour spent." There is a tangible joy about creating something that wasn't there before.

Bassist Jeff Ament on the song:

We were out in the room playing the song and learning it. In the process, [producer Adam Kasper] went and re-miked everything very covertly. So all of the sudden when we were ready to play it, it was up and he captured it. Nailed it. That to me was really critical and kind of how the record sounds. A lot of times, there's that cool thing when you don't quite know the song and everybody is really concentrating. It lasts for four or five takes and then it's gone. After that, it's all cerebral.

Guitarist Stone Gossard about the song:

That's a real live performance with lots of room ambience. It's us trying to keep up with the chord changes! There are some nice drums and bass. The sentiment of the song is amazing.

== Lyrics ==
The lyrics for "Thumbing My Way" are about a person in turmoil. In an interview, Vedder stated that the song is not about himself. He elaborated by saying, "I'm pretty good at removing myself from most of the songs. One thing about writing songs is, they don't always have to be about you. When they are always about someone, I lose interest after a while." The song includes several references to hitchhiking. At the band's February 14, 2003 concert in Sydney, Australia at the Sydney Entertainment Centre, Vedder said, "This song's about hitchhiking your way through a broken heart."

== Reception ==
In its review of Riot Act, The Guardian stated that "Thumbing My Way" "resembles an acoustic 'Love Will Tear Us Apart'" and called it one of the album's "best moments." Brett Hickman of Stylus said, "Never a band to make their quieter forays really work, the band deliver their best one with "Thumbing My Way". Through its muted organ, acoustic guitars, brushed drums and Vedder's semi-coherent line readings, the band matches intent with mood perfectly."

== Music video ==
The music video for "Thumbing My Way" was directed by James Frost. The video was filmed at Seattle's Chop Suey club in September 2002. The video consists of a filmed live performance of the band rather than a conceptual video. It was one of five videos shot at the club to promote Riot Act (including "I Am Mine", "Save You", "Love Boat Captain", and "1/2 Full"). Up to that point the band had not made any music videos since 1998's "Do the Evolution". The video was released in late 2002.

== Live performances ==
"Thumbing My Way" was first performed live by Vedder during a solo performance at the Wiltern Theatre in Los Angeles on February 26, 2002. The first performance of the song with the full band took place at the band's December 6, 2002 concert in Seattle at The Showbox. Live performances of "Thumbing My Way" can be found on various official bootlegs and the live album Live at Benaroya Hall. Performances of the song are also included on the DVDs Live at the Showbox and Live at the Garden.
