= Save You (Pearl Jam song) =

2002 single by Pearl Jam

Single by Pearl Jam

from the album Riot Act
- B-side: "Other Side"
- Released: February 11, 2003
- Studio: Studio X, Seattle, Washington
- Genre: Rock
- Length: 3:50
- Label: Epic
- Songwriters: Mike McCready, Jeff Ament, Matt Cameron, Stone Gossard, Eddie Vedder
- Lyricist: Eddie Vedder
- Producers: Adam Kasper, Pearl Jam

Pearl Jam singles chronology
"I Am Mine" (2002)	"Save You" (2003)	"Love Boat Captain" (2003)

Music video
- "Save You" on YouTube

Audio sample
- file; help

"Save You" is a song by American rock band Pearl Jam, released in February 2003 as the second single from the band's seventh studio album, Riot Act (2002). Although credited to all members of Pearl Jam, it features lyrics written by vocalist Eddie Vedder and music primarily written by guitarist Mike McCready. The song peaked at number 23 on the Billboard Mainstream Rock Tracks chart. The song was included on Pearl Jam's 2004 greatest hits album, rearviewmirror (Greatest Hits 1991–2003).

== Origin and recording ==
The guitar riff for "Save You" was written by guitarist Mike McCready, who said about the song:

Well, what happened with all that was, I was sitting down with Stone, and I had two ideas, and one idea I worked really hard on and thought it was totally great and then I played it for him, and he goes, "Well, that's not...well that's okay. You got anything else?" And so, the other thing I had was the "Save You" riff, and he goes, "Oh, that's cool." You know, so it's...I was really built up to wanting to play this other song, and nobody seemed to be very excited about it...but they were about the "Save You" riff. It's something I came up with, I live in California, I just came up with the riff down there, and then Stone and I kicked it around in the studio before we went in, and it just...it had good energy to it. And it was more his excitement about it that made it happen.

In another interview, McCready stated:

I came in with that riff and we just kind of started jamming on it. It was a blast to play. The track that actually ended up on there, halfway through the song, Matt lost his headphones. He was going off. That's my favorite part of that song, his crazy drum fills. I like the solo too, but the drum fills are insane how good they are. He's doing them without his headphones, just by watching the bass.

During the recording of the song, drummer Matt Cameron lost his headphones. He was able to finish the recording of the song by watching bassist Jeff Ament's fingers as he played the bass. Cameron stated:

It was me watching Jeff's fingers and hoping I was in time, you know? There's a breakdown of just me and Jeff. I hit a cymbal, moved my head, and the headphones went flying. A little point of interest there for the listener!

== Lyrics ==
The lyrics for "Save You" represent the anger felt by anyone who watches a close friend waste away his or her life. Vocalist Eddie Vedder about the song:

One thing I've learned about addiction in the last few years is that having seen other folk go through it, and really not having done that, with heroin which can grip you that intensely. I didn't have a complete understanding and a lot of times it was easy to come to the conclusion that you place blame on the person or accuse them of weakness or ask, "Why couldn't Kurt [Cobain] keep it together?" There was always that in the back of your mind. So with all the sympathy and empathy you could muster you still felt like, "Wow, there was so much to live for." What I've learned is there really isn't any blame. It has happened to some folks I cared about so much and had it so together, so it really isn't blame thing. I think the song is expressing how badly you want to help.

When asked in an interview about the profanities in the song's lyrics, Vedder stated:

It is a term of endearment. Really, it is, especially when you're a little bit frustrated...It's just something I've experienced a number of times and...It came out quick. I couldn't figure out any other word besides [fucker] that had the same impact. Another potential radio hit. I did have it up pretty loud a few times in traffic and even I felt a little bashful. That and I had a [fucking] mohawk.

== Release and reception ==
"Save You" was released to several radio formats on December 9, 2002, while the physical release of the single was issued on February 11, 2003. "Save You" was released as a single with a previously unreleased B-side titled "Other Side," which can also be found on the compilation album, Lost Dogs (2003). The song peaked at number 23 on the Billboard Mainstream Rock Tracks chart and number 29 on the Billboard Modern Rock Tracks chart.

Outside the United States, the single was released commercially in Canada. In Canada, the song reached the top 20 on the Canadian Singles Chart.

Louis Pattison of NME called the song "a magic carpet ride of bucking riffery and thrashing bead-shakers" and stated that it "[ranks] with Pearl Jam's best." Brett Hickman of Stylus said, "What [Riot Act] also makes known is that the band still likes to crank it. This is especially clear on "Save You." The guitars screech and churn, while Cameron hammers home a crackling beat."

== Music video ==
The music video for "Save You" was directed by James Frost. The video was filmed at Seattle, Washington's Chop Suey club in September 2002. The video consists of a filmed live performance of the band rather than a conceptual video. It was one of five videos shot at the club to promote Riot Act (including "I Am Mine," "Love Boat Captain," "Thumbing My Way" and "½ Full"). Up to that point the band had not made any music videos since 1998's "Do the Evolution". The video was released in late 2002.

== Live performances ==
The band played "Save You" when it appeared on the Late Show with David Letterman in November 2002 in support of Riot Act. The song was first performed live in concert at the band's December 5, 2002, concert in Seattle, Washington at The Showbox. Live performances of "Save You" can be found on various official bootlegs, the live album Live at Easy Street, the Live at the Gorge 05/06 box set, and the live album Live at Lollapalooza 2007. Performances of the song are also included on the DVDs Live at the Showbox and Live at the Garden.

== Track listing ==
1. "Save You" (Jeff Ament, Matt Cameron, Stone Gossard, Mike McCready, Eddie Vedder) – 3:51
2. "Other Side" (Ament) – 4:02

== Charts ==
Chart (2003)	Peak position
Canada (Nielsen SoundScan)	17
US Alternative Airplay (Billboard)	29
US Mainstream Rock Airplay (Billboard)	23
