= Chop Suey (Seattle) =

Music venue in Seattle, Washington, U.S.

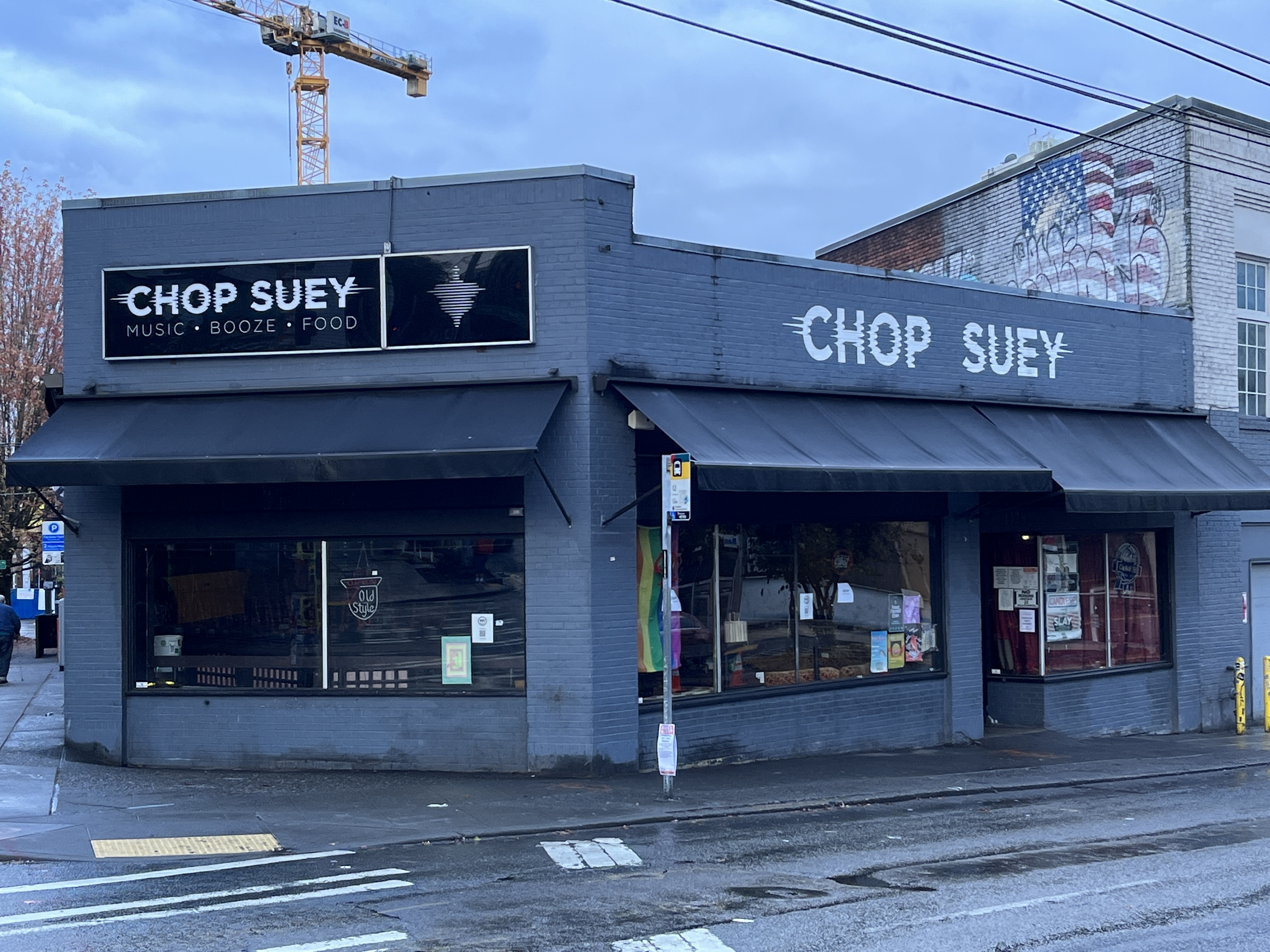
- The venue's exterior in 2022
- Interactive map of Chop Suey
- Address: 1325 East Madison Street; Seattle, Washington; United States
- Coordinates: 47°36′49″N 122°18′52″W

Chop Suey is a music venue in Seattle, Washington, United States.

== Description ==
Lonely Planet says, "Chop Suey is a small, dark space with high ceilings and a ramshackle faux-Chinese motif. Reborn under new ownership in 2015, it now serves burger-biased food as well as booze and music. The bookings are as mixed as the dish it's named after – electronica, hip-hop, alt-rock and other creative rumblings from Seattle's music underground." Regular dance events held at the venue include Candi Pop and Dance Yourself Clean.

== History ==
In 2009, a man was charged for killing a hip-hop artist at the venue.

In 2015, new owners were pressured to change the venue's name. Chop Suey saw a soft reopening in March 2015.

A kitchen called The Escondite opened within the venue in 2016.
