= Daughter (song) =

1993 single by Pearl Jam

Single by Pearl Jam

from the album Vs.
- B-side: "Blood" (live); "Yellow Ledbetter" (live)
- Released: December 20, 1993
- Genre: Grunge; country rock
- Length: 3:55
- Label: Epic
- Composers: Dave Abbruzzese; Jeff Ament; Stone Gossard; Mike McCready; Eddie Vedder
- Lyricist: Eddie Vedder
- Producers: Brendan O'Brien; Pearl Jam

Pearl Jam singles chronology
"Go" (1993)	"Daughter" (1993)	"Animal" (1994)

Music video
- "Daughter" on YouTube

Audio sample
- file; help

"Daughter" is a song by American rock band Pearl Jam, released in December 1993 by Epic Records as the second single from the band's second studio album, Vs. (1993). The lyrics were written by vocalist Eddie Vedder and music by the band's members.

"Daughter" topped the US Billboard Album Rock Tracks and Modern Rock Tracks charts and peaked at No. 33 on the Billboard Hot 100 Airplay chart. Outside the United States, the song reached No. 16 in Canada and is Pearl Jam's highest-charting single in Ireland, reaching No. 4. "Daughter" also reached No. 11 in New Zealand and No. 18 in both Australia and the United Kingdom. The song was later included on Pearl Jam's 2004 greatest hits album, Rearviewmirror (Greatest Hits 1991–2003).

== Origin and recording ==
Guitarist Stone Gossard used a Guild wide-body acoustic guitar to write the music for "Daughter". Bassist Jeff Ament plays upright bass on the song. Guitarist Mike McCready said, "That's one of the few solos I really had to sit down and work out." Drummer Dave Abbruzzese on his drumming on "Daughter":

When we were originally working on "Daughter", I did a lot more stuff on the toms. But when we went in to record it, Brendan [O'Brien] suggested trying something different, to just use the kick and snare. That was a trip, because we'd already been playing that song for half a year, and I was kind of used to what I was doing. At first I was like, "Well...okay..." so I set up a 26" kick, a snare, and an 18" floor tom, and we just used the room mic's and went for it. It actually brought out a whole new dimension of the song for me, and it felt really fresh to me to play it like that. Live, I kind of mix the two approaches together.

== Lyrics ==
Eddie Vedder said about the song "Daughter":

"The child in that song obviously has a learning difficulty, and it's only in the last few years that they've actually been able to diagnose these learning disabilities, that before were looked at as misbehavior; as just outright rebelliousness, but no one knew what it was. These kids, because they seemed unable or reluctant to learn, they'd end up getting the shit beaten outta them. The song ends, you know, with this idea of the shades going down—so that the neighbors can't see what happens next. What hurts about shit like that is that it ends up defining people's lives. They have to live with that abuse for the rest of their lives. Good, creative people are just fucking destroyed."

== Release and reception ==
While the "Daughter" single was released commercially to foreign markets in 1993, the commercial single was not released in the United States until June 27, 1995, and was only available as a more expensive import version beforehand. Chris True of AllMusic described the song as "sort-of classic Pearl Jam." He added, "It's earnest, it's got tension, and that nod to classic rock. It's Pearl Jam." At the 1995 Grammy Awards, "Daughter" received a nomination for Best Rock Performance by a Duo or Group with Vocal.

"Daughter" experienced chart success, topping the US Billboard Album Rock Tracks chart for eight weeks and the Modern Rock Tracks chart for one week. It is their only song to top both of these charts. In Canada, the song reached No. 16 on the RPM 100 Hit Tracks chart. In Europe, the song was a top-five success in Ireland, becoming Pearl Jam's highest-charting song by peaking at No. 4; it was their second top-10 hit there, after "Jeremy". In the United Kingdom, the song reached No. 18, while in the Netherlands, it reached No. 46, and in Belgium, it reached No. 39. The song was also successful in Australasia, peaking at No. 11 in New Zealand and No. 18 in Australia.

== Live performances ==
"Daughter" was first performed live at Neil Young's 1992 Bridge School Benefit. It was also played at the band's December 31, 1992, concert at The Academy Theater in New York City, where Vedder introduced the song as "Brother". Both of these performances of the song featured different lyrics than the version that would ultimately wind up on Vs.

Live performances of "Daughter" can be found on the "Dissident"/Live in Atlanta box set, the live album Live on Two Legs, various official bootlegs, the live album Live at Benaroya Hall, the live album Live in NYC 12/31/92, the Live at the Gorge 05/06 box set, and the live album Live at Lollapalooza 2007. Performances of the song are also included on the DVDs Touring Band 2000, Live at the Showbox, and Live at the Garden. The version of the song on Live at Lollapalooza 2007, onto which the band tagged Pink Floyd's "Another Brick in the Wall (Part 2)," features Vedder singing the lyrics "George Bush leave this world alone/George Bush find yourself another home". The band discovered that some of the Bush-related lyrics were excised from the AT&T webcast of Lollapalooza 2007, and questioned whether that constituted censorship. AT&T later apologized and blamed the censorship on contractor Davie Brown Entertainment. At the 2014 show in Milan, the band tagged the Disney song "Let It Go" to the end of the song's performance.

== Track listings ==
All songs were written by Dave Abbruzzese, Jeff Ament, Stone Gossard, Mike McCready, and Eddie Vedder except where noted. "Blood" was recorded live on November 5, 1993, at the Empire Polo Fields in Indio, California. "Yellow Ledbetter" was recorded live on November 6, 1993, at the Mesa Amphitheatre in Mesa, Arizona.

- CD (US, Australia, UK), 3-inch CD (Japan), 12-inch vinyl (UK), and cassette (Australia)
1. "Daughter" – 3:54
2. "Blood" (live) – 3:34
3. "Yellow Ledbetter" (live) (Ament, McCready, Vedder) – 5:16
- CD (Europe), 7-inch vinyl (UK), and cassette (UK)
1. "Daughter" – 3:54
2. "Blood" (live) – 3:34
- 7-inch vinyl (Philippines)
1. "Daughter" – 3:53
2. "Animal" – 2:46

== Charts ==
=== Weekly charts ===
Chart (1993–1994)	Peak position
Australia (ARIA)	18
Belgium (Ultratop 50 Flanders)	39
Canada Top Singles (RPM)	16
Europe (Eurochart Hot 100)	42
European Hit Radio Top 40 (Music & Media)	28
Ireland (IRMA)	4
Italy Airplay (Music & Media)	12
Netherlands (Dutch Top 40 Tipparade)	6
Netherlands (Single Top 100)	46
New Zealand (Recorded Music NZ)	11
Spain Airplay (Music & Media)	5
UK Singles (Official Charts)	18
UK Airplay (Music Week)	22
US Radio Songs (Billboard)	33
US Alternative Airplay (Billboard)	1
US Mainstream Rock Airplay (Billboard)	1
US Pop Airplay (Billboard)	28

Chart (1996)	Peak position
US Billboard Hot 100	97

=== Year-end charts ===
Chart (1994)	Position
Australia (ARIA)	91
US Hot 100 Airplay (Billboard)	51
US Album Rock Tracks (Billboard)	7

Chart (2001)	Position
Canada (Nielsen SoundScan)	189

== Certifications ==
Certifications for "Daughter"
Region	Certification	Certified units/sales
Brazil (Pro-Música Brasil)	Gold	30,000^{‡}
Canada (Music Canada)	2× Platinum	160,000^{‡}
New Zealand (RMNZ)	2× Platinum	60,000^{‡}
United States (RIAA)	Platinum	1,000,000^{‡}
^{‡} Sales+streaming figures based on certification alone.

== Release history ==
Region	Date	Format(s)	Label(s)	Ref.
United States	November 2, 1993	Radio	Epic	
United Kingdom	December 20, 1993	7-inch vinyl; 12-inch vinyl; CD; cassette	Epic	
Australia	January 17, 1994	CD; cassette	Epic	
Japan	March 9, 1994	Mini-CD	Sony	
United States	June 27, 1995	CD	Epic	

== See also ==
- List of Billboard Mainstream Rock number-one songs of the 1990s
- List of Billboard Modern Rock Tracks number ones of the 1990s
