= Yellow Ledbetter =

Song by Pearl Jam
- A-side: "Jeremy"
- Released: August 1992
- Recorded: March 27 – April 26, 1991 at London Bridge Studios, Seattle, Washington
- Genre: Grunge, blues rock
- Length: 5:01
- Label: Epic
- Composers: Jeff Ament, Mike McCready
- Lyricist: Eddie Vedder
- Producer: Rick Parashar

"Yellow Ledbetter" is a song by the American band Pearl Jam. Featuring lyrics written by vocalist Eddie Vedder and music co-written by bassist Jeff Ament and guitarist Mike McCready, "Yellow Ledbetter" was an outtake from the band's debut album, Ten (1991). "Yellow Ledbetter" was selected by the band to be on the B-side of the 1992 single "Jeremy", where it was first released. The song eventually found its way onto radio, peaking at number 21 on the Billboard Mainstream Rock Tracks chart. The song was also included on Pearl Jam's 2003 B-sides and rarities album Lost Dogs, and on their 2004 greatest hits album Rearviewmirror (Greatest Hits 1991–2003).

== Origin and recording ==
"Yellow Ledbetter" was a Ten outtake and one of the first songs Pearl Jam wrote as a group. The song features lyrics written by vocalist Eddie Vedder and music co-written by bassist Jeff Ament and guitarist Mike McCready. The version of "Yellow Ledbetter" that was eventually released was the second take of the song. McCready says of the song,

That was written around the time of the first record [Ten]. I think that was the second thing Ed and I wrote together. It came out of a jam in the studio and Ed didn't really have any lyrics. He came up with some ideas right there on the spot, and that's what we recorded. For some reason, it didn't make it on Ten. I was kind of bummed at the time. I really wanted it to be on our first record. But at the time, I was really young and just happy to be around this situation, so I did whatever.

== Lyrics ==
The song title "Yellow Ledbetter" is derived from the actual name of an old friend of Vedder's from Chicago, named Tim Ledbetter. Although many fans have made their own interpretations of the song's meaning, a common theory has been that the song is about someone receiving a letter saying that his or her brother had died overseas in war, as cited from the lyrics in the Live at the Garden version, "I don't know whether my brother will be coming home in a box or a bag." On the official bootleg release of 5/3/03 – State College, Pennsylvania, Vedder sings "I'd like to wish this war away, and I tried, but it just, just don't happen, don't happen that way/And my brother...they sent him off to fight for the flag. I just, I don't hope he comes home in a box or a bag", and "And I know that he's just following his path. As long, as long as it's not a box or a bag." On the official bootleg release of 7/11/03 – Mansfield, Massachusetts, Vedder sings in the first verse "I think of him when I go to bed, and he's coming home in a box or a bag."

Vedder has been known to change the lyrics of the song when singing it live, so it is difficult to know if what he is singing at the time are the original lyrics from 1991. In the liner notes for Lost Dogs, McCready said:

"A riff loosely based on something...I had during the Ten sessions. I thought it was pretty. Eddie started making up words on the spot and we kept them. I still don't know what it's about and I don't want to! I love it. Fans like it too!"

On November 2, 2020 during an interview with Howard Stern, Vedder and Stern discussed the lyrics. Vedder told Stern that Stern's "misheard lyric" to Yellow Ledbetter - "boxer or the bag" instead of "box or a bag" - was actually better than the actual lyrics. Vedder subsequently sang Stern's lyrics during Pearl Jam's performance on the Howard Stern Show the same day.

Vedder said in an online chat that the song was written around the time of the Gulf War and added that "it's an anti-patriotic song, actually." On August 7, 2008, at a solo performance at the New Jersey Performing Arts Center in Newark, New Jersey, Vedder took a question from the audience requesting that he explain the meaning of "Yellow Ledbetter". At first, Vedder joked, "Wait...you mean there's lyrics?" He went on to talk about how the song took as its subject a friend of his from Seattle whose brother served in the first Gulf War. His friend received a "yellow letter" in the mail informing him that his brother had died in the war. Vedder and his friend then went for a walk. On this walk, the friend, whom Vedder described as "alternative looking", happened by a house with an American flag flying and people on the porch. He stopped and gestured to the flag, as if to salute it, but the people on the porch glared at him disapprovingly due to his appearance.

== Reception ==
Without being released as a single, "Yellow Ledbetter" peaked at number 21 on the Billboard Mainstream Rock Tracks chart and number 26 on the Billboard Modern Rock Tracks chart in 1994. The song has become a favorite among fans of the band. Although the song was not released on any of Pearl Jam's studio albums, it remains one of their most popular songs.

Steve Huey of Allmusic said that McCready's "airy Stevie Ray Vaughan imitations provide the essential meat of the song." He added, "Eddie Vedder's vocal is alternately intense and achingly wistful, with the latter particularly suiting the song's mood." He proclaimed "Yellow Ledbetter" as "the sound of a band overflowing with prime material." Will Hermes of Spin said, "The Hendrix-indebted power ballad "Yellow Ledbetter" is some of the best Pearl Jam music ever recorded."

"Yellow Ledbetter" has since been regarded as one of the band's best songs. In 2021, American Songwriter ranked the song number seven on their list of the 10 greatest Pearl Jam songs, and Kerrang ranked the song number three on their list of the 20 greatest Pearl Jam songs.

== Live performances ==
The first full live performance of "Yellow Ledbetter" occurred at the band's February 15, 1992, concert in Madrid, Spain. "Yellow Ledbetter" is frequently performed at Pearl Jam concerts, often as the last song of the concert. The freeform nature of the song allows the band to improvise and change the song around when performing it live. During performances, McCready often plays the main riff quite differently than on the record and uses overdrive as opposed to the previous clean channel. He also lengthens the outro, sometimes incorporating various songs which have influenced his playing style, such as Jimi Hendrix's "Little Wing" or "The Star-Spangled Banner", which bears many similarities to the song. Similarly, Vedder almost always changes the lyrics around, though he sticks with the same rhythm as the original recording.

Live performances of "Yellow Ledbetter" can be found on the "Daughter" single, the Tibetan Freedom Concert compilation box set, various official bootlegs, the live album Live at Benaroya Hall, and the Live at the Gorge 05/06 box set. Performances of the song are also included on the DVDs Live at the Showbox, Live at the Garden, and Immagine in Cornice, which are some of the special features. The version of the song on Tibetan Freedom Concert is a performance by Vedder and McCready that was recorded live at the Tibetan Freedom Concert.

== Soundtracks ==
A brief snippet of the song appears in the series finale of the television series Friends after Rachel boards the plane. This marked the first time that Pearl Jam licensed a song for usage in a television show. According to a spokesperson for the group, it was "simply a matter of the show's producers asking permission." The song also played over the end credits of the 2011 film 50/50. The song was used in season 1, episode 8 of Stumptown. It was also used in the closing credits of the final episode of the Showtime epic ensemble Super Pumped: The Story of Uber following CEO Travis Kalanick’s demise about what he may do next and the aftermath of the Uber behemoth. It is also featured at the end of episode 6 of season 3 of House M.D., "Epic Fail". It also is featured in the last scene of episode 22 ("The Long Blue Line") of season 6 of Cold Case.

== Personnel ==
Pearl Jam

- Eddie Vedder – vocals
- Mike McCready – guitar
- Stone Gossard – guitar
- Jeff Ament – bass
- Dave Krusen – drums

Production

- Rick Parashar – producer, mixing engineer
- Pearl Jam – producer
- Nick DiDia – recording engineer
- Bob Ludwig – mastering engineer

== Chart positions ==
Chart (1994)	Position
US Mainstream Rock Tracks	21
US Modern Rock Tracks	26

== Certifications ==
Region	Certification	Certified units/sales
New Zealand (RMNZ)	2× Platinum	60,000^{‡}
^{‡} Sales+streaming figures based on certification alone.

== See also ==
- List of anti-war songs
