= Black (Pearl Jam song) =

Song by Pearl Jam

Promotional single by Pearl Jam

from the album Ten
- Released: August 27, 1991
- Recorded: London Bridge Studios, Seattle, Washington
- Genre: Grunge; ballad
- Length: 5:43
- Label: Epic
- Composer: Stone Gossard
- Lyricist: Eddie Vedder
- Producers: Rick Parashar; Pearl Jam

"Black" is a song by American rock band Pearl Jam. The song is the fifth track on their 1991 debut album, Ten, and features lyrics written by vocalist Eddie Vedder and music written by guitarist Stone Gossard.

After Ten experienced major success in 1992, Pearl Jam's record label Epic Records urged the group to release the song as a single. The band refused, citing the song's personal nature. Despite the lack of a single release, the song managed to reach No. 3 on the US Billboard Mainstream Rock Tracks chart. Remixed versions of the song were included on Pearl Jam's 2004 greatest hits album, Rearviewmirror, and the 2009 Ten reissue. "Black" remains one of the band's most popular songs, as well as a fan favorite.

== Origin and recording ==
The song originated as an instrumental demo under the name "E Ballad" that was written by guitarist Stone Gossard in 1990. It was one of five songs compiled onto a tape called Stone Gossard Demos '91 that was circulated in the hopes of finding a singer and drummer for Pearl Jam. The tape made its way into the hands of vocalist Eddie Vedder, who was working as a San Diego gas station attendant at the time. Vedder recorded vocals for three of the songs on the demo tape ("Alive", "Once", and "Footsteps"), and mailed the tape back to Seattle. Upon hearing the tape, the band invited Vedder to come to Seattle. On his way to Seattle, Vedder wrote lyrics for "E Ballad", which he called "Black". The song was recorded during the Ten album recording sessions at London Bridge Studios with Rick Parashar at the helm as producer. The song was finally mixed and completed at Ridge Farm Studios in Surrey, England with Tim Palmer.

Guitarist Mike McCready on the song's lead guitar work:

That's more of a Stevie [Ray Vaughan] rip-off, with me playing little flowing things. I was way into that trip—I still am, actually, but it was probably more obvious back then. I really thought the song was beautiful. Stone wrote it and he just let me do what I wanted.

== Lyrics ==
Vocalist Eddie Vedder on the song's lyrics:

Pearl Jam's Eddie Vedder had been a fan of American Music Club for years. Pearl Jam's song 'Black', Melody Maker's Allan Jones maintains, "couldn't have been written without AMC's songs as an example. 'Black' doesn't quote directly from 'Western Sky,' but it paraphrases the line 'Please be happy baby' where Vedder sings in a very Eitzel way, 'I hope someday you'll have a beautiful life'." Vedder confirmed Jones' interpretation when they first met. "Oh yes, nobody ever picked up on that," the singer told him. "It is American Music Club, but I'm surprised that anyone here has even heard of them."

In the 2011 book Pearl Jam Twenty, Vedder said about the meaning of the song:

It's about first relationships. The song is about letting go. It's very rare for a relationship to withstand the Earth's gravitational pull and where it's going to take people and how they're going to grow. I've heard it said that you can't really have a true love unless it was a love unrequited. It's a harsh one, because then your truest one is the one you can't have forever.

== Reception ==
"Black" became one of Pearl Jam's best-known songs and is a central emotional piece on the album Ten. Despite pressure from Epic Records, the band refused to make it into a single, citing it as too personal and expressing fear that its emotional weight would be destroyed in a music video. Vedder stated that "fragile songs get crushed by the business. I don't want to be a part of it. I don't think the band wants to be part of it." Vedder personally called radio station managers to make sure Epic had not released the song as a single against his wishes. In spite of this, the song charted at number three on the Billboard Mainstream Rock Tracks chart and number 20 on the Billboard Modern Rock Tracks chart in 1993.

Stephen M. Deusner of Pitchfork Media said, "On songs like...'Black,' with strangely dramatic vocalizations, there's a hardscrabble dynamic that the band would be unable to capture on subsequent releases."

In March 2009, "Black" was made available as downloadable content for the Rock Band series as a master track as part of the album Ten. The song was featured in the Cold Case episode "Into the Blue" in 2009.

In May 2011, "Black" was voted the 9th Best Ballad of All Time by readers of Rolling Stone magazine.

In 2021, American Songwriter ranked the song number five on their list of the 10 greatest Pearl Jam songs, and Kerrang ranked the song number one on their list of the 20 greatest Pearl Jam songs.

Basketball player Dennis Rodman said that "Black" stopped him from attempting suicide in 1993.

== Live performances ==
"Black" was first performed live at the band's October 22, 1990, concert in Seattle, Washington at the Off Ramp Café. Pearl Jam performed the song for its appearance on MTV Unplugged in 1992. Live performances of "Black" can be found on the "Dissident"/Live in Atlanta box set, the live album Live on Two Legs, various official bootlegs, the live album Live at Benaroya Hall, the Live at the Gorge 05/06 box set, and the Drop in the Park LP included in the Super Deluxe edition of the Ten reissue. Performances of the song are also included on the DVD Live at the Garden and the MTV Unplugged DVD included in the Ten reissue.

== Personnel ==
=== Pearl Jam ===
- Eddie Vedder – vocals
- Mike McCready – lead guitar
- Stone Gossard – rhythm guitar
- Jeff Ament – bass guitar
- Dave Krusen – drums

=== Additional personnel ===
- Rick Parashar – piano, organ

== Charts ==
=== Weekly charts ===
Chart (1993)	Peak position
US Alternative Airplay (Billboard)	20
US Mainstream Rock (Billboard)	3

=== Year-end charts ===
Chart (1993)	Position
US Album Rock Tracks (Billboard)	9

== Certifications ==
Region	Certification	Certified units/sales
Brazil (Pro-Música Brasil)	Platinum	60,000^{‡}
Italy (FIMI) Sales since 2009	Gold	35,000^{‡}
New Zealand (RMNZ)	4× Platinum	120,000^{‡}
United Kingdom (BPI)	Gold	400,000^{‡}
^{‡} Sales+streaming figures based on certification alone.
