= Boom Gaspar =

American musician

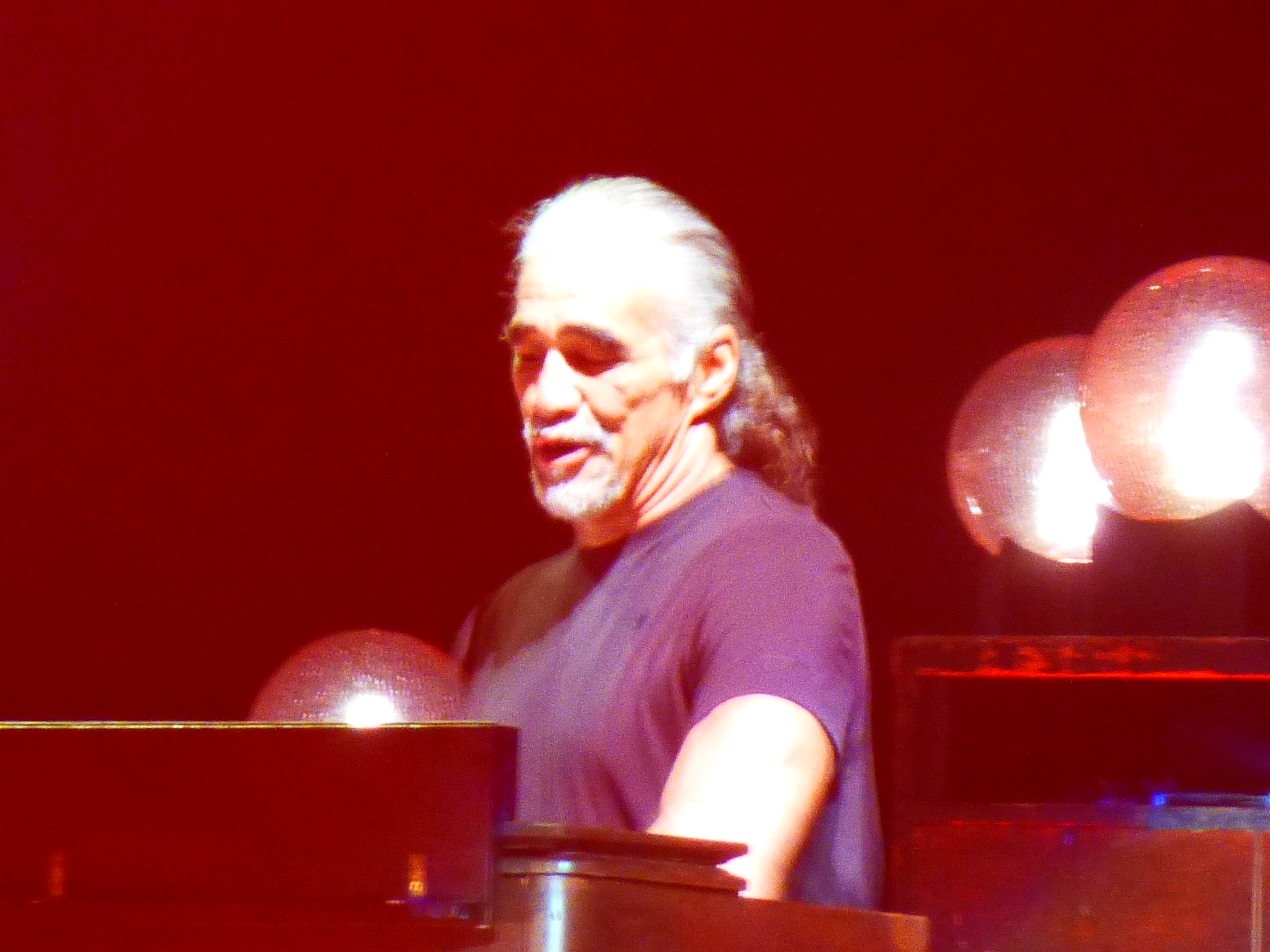
- Boom Gaspar on stage with Pearl Jam in Oakland on November 26, 2013

Background information
- Born: Kenneth E. Gaspar; February 3, 1953 (age 73); Waimānalo, Hawaii, U.S.
- Genres: Rock, alternative rock, blues rock
- Occupation: Musician
- Instrument: Keyboards
- Years active: mid 1970s–present

Kenneth E. "Boom" Gaspar (born February 3, 1953) is an American musician. He has performed as a keyboardist with American rock band Pearl Jam since 2002.

== Biography ==
=== Early life ===
Boom Gaspar grew up in Waimānalo, Hawaii. He started playing music when he was eleven years old. After graduating from Kailua High School, Gaspar spent the next thirty years doing local shows throughout Hawaii with acts such as the Mackey Feary Band, Harmony, Simplisity, and played in Seattle with first billing with the famous blues guitarist Albert Collins.

=== Pearl Jam ===
Pearl Jam frontman Eddie Vedder first met Gaspar while in Hawaii. Gaspar was introduced to Vedder through Ramones bassist C. J. Ramone. Gaspar has appeared on the Pearl Jam albums Riot Act (2002), Pearl Jam (2006) and Lightning Bolt (2013). He has a songwriting credit for the song "Love Boat Captain" which is on Riot Act. According to Gaspar, the song initially developed out of a jam session he had with Vedder shortly after the two first met. When they were done, Vedder asked Gaspar if he was "ready to go to Seattle." He has become known for his long solos during "Crazy Mary", a song originally written by Victoria Williams, which has become a fan favorite during live Pearl Jam shows. This often culminates in a guitar/organ duel between Gaspar and guitarist Mike McCready. Gaspar told Keyboard Magazine that his biggest challenge playing with the band was "learning what Pearl Jam is, and learning each of the band members’ different styles. It’s such an education for me. Every night is different and playing with them is amazing. I love challenges. They make you a better player and challenges are what music is all about."

== Discography ==
=== Pearl Jam discography ===
Year	Title	Label	Track(s)
2002	Riot Act	Epic	Some
2003	2003 Official Bootlegs (Australia, Japan, and North America)	Epic	Some
2003	Big Fish: Music from the Motion Picture	Sony	"Man of the Hour"
2004	Hot Stove, Cool Music, Vol. 1	Fenway	"Bu$hleaguer" (live)
2004	Live at Benaroya Hall	BMG	Some
2004	For the Lady	Rhino/WEA	"Better Man" (live)
2004	rearviewmirror (Greatest Hits 1991–2003)	Epic	"I Am Mine", "Save You", and "Man of the Hour"
2005	2005 Official Bootlegs (North America and South America)	Ten Club	Some
2006	Pearl Jam	J	Some
2006	2006 Official Bootlegs (North America, Europe, and Australia)	Ten Club	Some
2007	Live at the Gorge 05/06	Rhino/WEA	Some
2007	Live at Lollapalooza 2007	Self-released	Some
2008	2008 United States Official Bootlegs	Kufala	Some
2009	2009 Official Bootlegs	Self-released	Some
2010	2010 Official Bootlegs	Self-released	Some
2013	Lightning Bolt	Monkey Wrench	"Sirens", others
2017	Let's Play Two	Republic	All

=== Po & the 4Fathers discography ===
Year	Title	Label	Track(s)
2012	Kingdom Come/Do Ya 7"	Monkeywrench	All
