= Do the Evolution =

1998 promotional single by Pearl Jam

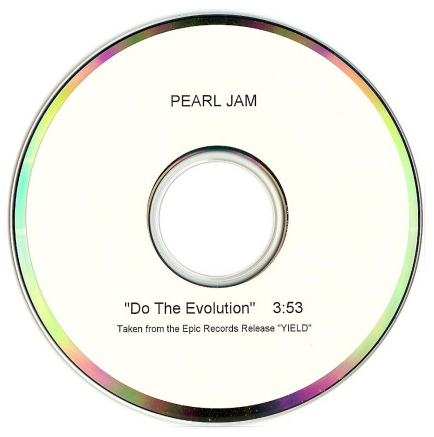
- U.S. promotional CD single

Promotional single by Pearl Jam

from the album Yield
- Released: February 3, 1998
- Recorded: 1997
- Genre: Hard rock, garage rock
- Length: 3:54
- Label: Epic
- Composer: Stone Gossard
- Lyricist: Eddie Vedder
- Producers: Brendan O'Brien, Pearl Jam

"Do the Evolution" is a song by American rock band Pearl Jam. Featuring lyrics written by vocalist Eddie Vedder and music written by guitarist Stone Gossard, "Do the Evolution" is the seventh track on the band's fifth studio album, Yield (1998). Despite the lack of a commercial single release, the song managed to reach number 33 on the Billboard Modern Rock Tracks chart. The song was included on Pearl Jam's 2004 greatest hits album, rearviewmirror (Greatest Hits 1991–2003). It was the first of the band's songs to receive a music video since "Oceans", the final single from the group's 1991 debut Ten.

== Origin and recording ==
"Do the Evolution" features lyrics written by vocalist Eddie Vedder and music written by guitarist Stone Gossard. Bassist Jeff Ament does not appear on the track. Gossard recorded the bass line for the track. Vedder said that it is his favorite song from Yield. He stated, "I can listen to it like it's some band that just came out of nowhere. I just like the song. I was able to listen to it as an outside observer and just really play it over and over. Maybe because I was singing it from a third person so it didn't really feel like me singing."

== Lyrics ==
When speaking about "Do the Evolution", Vedder stated, "That song is all about someone who's drunk with technology, who thinks they're the controlling living being on this planet. It's another one I'm not singing as myself." Pearl Jam has stated that the novel Ishmael influenced the writing of Yield, and according to the novel's writer, Daniel Quinn, this song comes the closest to expressing the ideas of the book. Vedder stated:

This Daniel Quinn book, Ishmael...I've never recommended a book before, but I would actually, in an interview, recommend it to everyone....But this book, it's kind of the book of my ... My whole year has been kind of with these thoughts in mind. And on an evolutionary level, that man has been on this planet for 3 million years, so that you have this number line that goes like this [hands wide apart]. And that we're about to celebrate the year 2000, which is this [holds hands less than one inch apart]. So here's this number line; here's what we know and celebrate. This book is a conversation with a man and an ape. And the ape really has it all together. He kinda knows the differences between him and the man, and points out how slight they are, and it creates an easy analogy for what man has done, thinking that they were the end-all. That man is the end-all thing on this earth. That the earth was around even so much longer before the 3 million years. Fifty million years of sharks and all these living things. Then man comes out of the muck, and 3 million years later he's standing, and now he's controlling everything and killing it. Just in the last hundred! Which is just a speck on this line. So what are we doin' here? This is just a good reminder...And I'm anxious to see what happens. You know, I've got a good seat for whatever happens next. It'll be interesting.

== Reception ==
Without being released as a single, "Do the Evolution" peaked at number 40 on the Billboard Mainstream Rock Tracks chart and number 34 on the Billboard Modern Rock Tracks chart in 1998. In Canada, the song reached number 50 on the RPM 100 Hit Tracks chart. At the 1999 Grammy Awards, "Do the Evolution" received a nomination for Best Hard Rock Performance.

In E! Online's review of Yield, "Do the Evolution" was described as having a "Neil Young-Beck hybrid feel." Tom Sinclair of Entertainment Weekly stated, "On the album's most gleeful hip shaker, "Do the Evolution", Vedder howls throwaway lyrics...while the guitars gnash and grind at the primitive melody, briefly evoking the gnarly cacophony of the Stooges' monumental Fun House."

== Music video ==
The animated music video for "Do the Evolution" was co-directed by Kevin Altieri, known for his direction on Batman: The Animated Series, and Todd McFarlane, better known for his work with the popular comic book Spawn and Korn's 1999 "Freak on a Leash" video. Vedder saw the first season of Spawn: The Animated Series on HBO in 1997, and was inspired by the art style of this series. After initially contacting McFarlane to work on the video, Vedder sent him a tape, where he put the music of the song over scenes from Spawn: The Animated Series. Vedder had recorded episodes of the series off HBO onto a VHS, and used the Avid video editing software to edit in the music.

The "Do the Evolution" video was produced by Joe Pearson, the president of Epoch Ink animation, and Terry Fitzgerald at TME. It was written and developed by Pearson and Altieri with input from McFarlane and Vedder. The total production time on the music video was 16 weeks. The animation pre-production was produced by Epoch Ink Animation at their studio in Santa Monica. Under Altieri and Pearson’s supervision the Epoch team boarded and designed the short in less than six weeks. Once McFarlane, Vedder, and Sony gave their final approvals, the designs were outsourced at Seoul, South Korea, to be animated at Sunmin Image Pictures and Jireh Animation. This process mirrored the animation for the Spawn: The Animated Series, which was also outsourced to South Korea. Over a four-week period, a team of over one hundred artists worked to deliver the finished animation.

Once the final animation was back in Los Angeles, California, Altieri, McFarlane, and Vedder edited the final cut at Vittello Productions. In a press release, McFarlane stated, "We choose to work with people who convey a particular attitude and this video is a tribute to that attitude," while Pearl Jam stated, "As artists we are challenged to expand the meaning of our work and by utilizing this visual medium and working with a visionary like Todd, we were able to further explore some of the themes we depicted in the song "Do the Evolution". Basically we've tried to make a good stoner video." The video premiered on August 24, 1998, on MTV's 120 Minutes. The video was the band's first since the final video for Ten, "Oceans". At the 1999 Grammy Awards, the music video received a nomination for Best Music Video, Short Form. The video clip for "Do the Evolution" can be found on the Touring Band 2000 DVD as one of the Special Features.

=== Video summary ===
Collage of scenes from the "Do the Evolution" video.

Throughout the video, a pale skinned woman in a black skimpy dress (similar in appearance to the character Death from the DC comic book series, The Sandman) dances and laughs, representing "Death" as it follows mankind through all of its history. The video begins with the evolution of life, from the smallest cell to the extinction of dinosaurs and reign of Homo sapiens. The video then cuts back and forth throughout human history, depicting man's primitive, violent nature that has remained essentially unchanged over the centuries. Such depictions include a knight preparing for the coming slaughter during the Crusades, a ritual dance by KKK (the dance is repeated with other groups throughout the video), a rally by Nazi-esque troops (with a symbol reminiscent of the Sig Rune, itself reminiscent the flash and circle used by the British Union of Fascists, instead of a swastika), concentration camp prisoners, a book burning, carnage upon a World War I-era battlefield, a girl stepping on an anthill as she runs blissfully through a field with the image suddenly changing to that of a landmine going off (as if the mine had been buried under the anthill itself), a death row inmate nervously waiting on an electric chair, the apparent virtual-reality rape of a woman, and the bombing of a Vietnamese village by an American jet, specifically an A-4 Skyhawk, the pilot of which removes his oxygen mask to reveal a skull laughing wildly, and a scene with a crying baby representing Bloody Saturday. Every scene portrayed complements the song's meaning and tightly follows the lyrics. When Vedder sings "Buying stocks on the day of the crash," a scene is shown where businessmen are committing suicide by jumping from buildings, a reference to the apocryphal suicides of Black Thursday during the Wall Street Crash of 1929.

Other social and environmental issues such as slavery, whaling, colonialism, Manifest Destiny, uncontrolled urbanization, vivisection, pollution, genetic modification and techno-progressivism are included. The music video blames humankind's brutality on leadership; with various scenes depicting a judge, a bishop or pope, a military dictator and an American president candidate, who is being portrayed as a puppet, controlled by someone unseen, from behind the scene. The video concludes in what seems to be future scenarios of the self-destruction of the human race, including the carpet bombing of a city of clones by futuristic aircraft, computers hijacking the human mind, and finally a nuclear explosion which leaves not only a city in ruins, but the planet damaged beyond recognition. However, near the end of the animation, the earth is briefly seen as an ovum, suggesting a rebirth and the perpetuation of the human condition. During the sequence of flashing images near the end of the video an image of a yield sign being smashed at the corner can be seen, which references the album title and cover art.

== Live performances ==
"Do the Evolution" was first performed live at the band's November 12, 1997, concert in Santa Cruz, California at The Catalyst. Live performances of "Do the Evolution" can be found on the live album Live on Two Legs, various official bootlegs, the Live at the Gorge 05/06 box set, and the live album Live at Lollapalooza 2007. Performances of the song are also included on the DVDs Single Video Theory, Touring Band 2000, Live at the Showbox, and Live at the Garden. On Touring Band 2000, Vedder adds the lyrics "free the West Memphis 3!" to the song.

== Credits ==
- Stone Gossard – guitar, bass guitar
- Jack Irons – drums
- Mike McCready – guitar
- Eddie Vedder – vocals

== Charts ==
| Chart (1998) | Peak position |
|---|---|
| Canada Top Singles (RPM) | 50 |
| US Alternative Airplay (Billboard) | 33 |
| US Mainstream Rock (Billboard) | 40 |
