= Binaural Tour =

2000 concert tour by Pearl Jam

- Tour by Pearl Jam
- Location: Europe; North America
- Associated album: Binaural
- Start date: May 23, 2000
- End date: November 6, 2000
- Legs: 3
- No. of shows: 47 in North America; 26 in Europe; 73 in total

Pearl Jam concert chronology
- Yield Tour (1998); Binaural Tour (2000); Riot Act Tour (2003)

The Binaural Tour was a concert tour by the American rock band Pearl Jam to support their sixth album, Binaural.

== History ==
Pearl Jam promoted Binaural with tours in Europe and North America. Before the tour started on May 23, with a show in Lisbon, Portugal, two warm-up concerts were performed in Bellingham, Washington, on May 10, and Vancouver on May 11.

Pearl Jam's 2000 European tour ended in tragedy on June 30, 2000, with an accident at the Roskilde Festival in Denmark. Nine fans were crushed underfoot and suffocated to death as the crowd rushed to the front. After numerous requests for the crowd to step back, the band stopped playing and tried to calm the crowd when the musicians realized what was happening, but it was already too late. The two remaining dates of the tour were cancelled, and the band seriously considered retiring after this event. Pearl Jam was initially blamed for the accident, but the band was later cleared of responsibility. Two additional concerts through July were cancelled.

A month after the European tour concluded, the band embarked on a two-leg North American tour, starting on August 3 in Virginia Beach, Virginia. The first leg of the tour focused on the East Coast of the United States, and then the band moved to the Midwest and the West Coast for the tour's second leg. On performing after the Roskilde tragedy, vocalist Eddie Vedder said that "playing, facing crowds, being together—it enabled us to start processing it." On October 22, 2000, the band played the MGM Grand in Las Vegas, celebrating the tenth anniversary of its first live performance as a band. Vedder took the opportunity to thank the many people who had helped the band come together and make it to ten years. He noted that "I would never do this accepting a Grammy or something." The song "Alive" was purposely omitted from all shows on this tour until the final night on November 6, 2000 in Seattle at KeyArena. The band performed that night for over three hours, playing most of its hits along with covers such as "The Kids Are Alright" and "Baba O'Riley" by The Who.

The European and North American tours were documented by a long series of official bootlegs, all of which were available in record stores as well as through the band's fan club. The band released 72 live albums in 2000 and 2001, and set a record for most albums to debut in the Billboard 200 at the same time. Following the conclusion of the 2000 tour, the band released Touring Band 2000, a DVD which featured select performances from the North American legs of the tour.

== Tour dates ==
Information taken from various sources.

Dates of the Binaural Tour. Red dots indicate recordings on the Touring Band DVD. Blue dots are cancelled shows.
Binaural Tour (the United States)
Binaural Tour (Europe)

Date	City	Country	Venue	Opening act	Live album
Warm-up shows
May 10, 2000	Bellingham	United States	Mount Baker Theatre	C Average	
May 11, 2000	Vancouver	Canada	Commodore Ballroom	C Average	
Europe leg
May 23, 2000	Lisbon	Portugal	Estádio do Restelo	The Vandals	
May 25, 2000	Barcelona	Spain	Palau Sant Jordi	The Vandals	
May 26, 2000	San Sebastián	Spain	Velódromo de Anoeta	The Vandals	
May 29, 2000	London	England	Wembley Arena	The Monkeywrench	
May 30, 2000	London	England	Wembley Arena	The Monkeywrench	5/30/00 – London, England
June 1, 2000	Dublin	Ireland	Point Theatre	The Vandals	
June 3, 2000	Glasgow	Scotland	SECC	The Vandals	
June 4, 2000	Manchester	England	Manchester Arena	The Vandals	
June 6, 2000	Cardiff	Wales	Cardiff International Arena	The Vandals	6/6/00 – Cardiff, Wales
June 8, 2000	Paris	France	Palais Omnisports de Paris-Bercy	The Vandals	6/8/00 – Paris, France
June 9, 2000	Nürburg	Germany	Rock am Ring		
June 11, 2000	Nuremberg	Germany	Rock im Park		
June 12, 2000	Landgraaf	Netherlands	Pinkpop Festival		
June 14, 2000	Prague	Czech Republic	Paegas Arena	The Dismemberment Plan	
June 15, 2000	Katowice	Poland	Spodek	The Dismemberment Plan	
June 16, 2000	Katowice	Poland	Spodek; Previously scheduled for the Petőfi Csarnok in Budapest, Hungary.	The Dismemberment Plan	6/16/00 – Katowice, Poland
June 18, 2000	Salzburg	Austria	Residenzplatz	The Dismemberment Plan	
June 19, 2000	Ljubljana	Slovenia	Hala Tivoli	The Dismemberment Plan	
June 20, 2000	Verona	Italy	Arena di Verona	The Dismemberment Plan	6/20/00 – Verona, Italy
June 22, 2000	Milan	Italy	Fila Forum Arena	The Dismemberment Plan	6/22/00 – Milan, Italy
June 23, 2000	Zürich	Switzerland	Hallenstadion	The Dismemberment Plan	
June 25, 2000	Berlin	Germany	Kindl-Bühne Wuhlheide	The Dismemberment Plan	
June 26, 2000	Hamburg	Germany	Alsterdorfer Sporthalle	The Dismemberment Plan	
June 28, 2000	Stockholm	Sweden	Sjöhistoriska Museet	The Dismemberment Plan	
June 29, 2000	Oslo	Norway	Oslo Spektrum	The Dismemberment Plan	
June 30, 2000	Roskilde	Denmark	Roskilde Festival; 9 men were crushed to death at this performance		
July 2, 2000	Werchter	Belgium	~~Rock Werchter~~ Cancelled		
July 3, 2000	Rotterdam	Netherlands	~~The Ahoy~~ Cancelled		
North America leg 1
August 3, 2000	Virginia Beach	United States	GTE Virginia Beach Amphitheater	Sonic Youth	
August 4, 2000	Charlotte	United States	Blockbuster Pavilion	Sonic Youth	
August 6, 2000	Greensboro	United States	Greensboro Coliseum	Sonic Youth	
August 7, 2000	Atlanta	United States	Philips Arena	Sonic Youth	8/7/00 – Atlanta, Georgia
August 9, 2000	West Palm Beach	United States	Mars Music Amphitheatre	Sonic Youth	
August 10, 2000	West Palm Beach	United States	Mars Music Amphitheatre	Sonic Youth	
August 12, 2000	Tampa	United States	Ice Palace	Sonic Youth	8/12/00 – Tampa, Florida
August 14, 2000	New Orleans	United States	New Orleans Arena	Sonic Youth	
August 15, 2000	Memphis	United States	Pyramid Arena	Sonic Youth	
August 17, 2000	Antioch	United States	AmSouth Amphitheater	Sonic Youth	
August 18, 2000	Noblesville	United States	Deer Creek Music Center	Sonic Youth	
August 20, 2000	Cincinnati	United States	Riverbend Music Center	Sonic Youth	
August 21, 2000	Columbus	United States	Polaris Amphitheater	Sonic Youth	8/21/00 – Columbus, Ohio
August 23, 2000	Wantagh	United States	Jones Beach Amphitheater	Sonic Youth	
August 24, 2000	Wantagh	United States	Jones Beach Amphitheater	Sonic Youth	8/24/00 – Jones Beach, New York
August 25, 2000	Wantagh	United States	Jones Beach Amphitheater	Sonic Youth	8/25/00 – Jones Beach, New York
August 27, 2000	Saratoga Springs	United States	Saratoga Performing Arts Center	Sonic Youth	
August 29, 2000	Mansfield	United States	Tweeter Center Boston	Sonic Youth	8/29/00 – Boston, Massachusetts
August 30, 2000	Mansfield	United States	Tweeter Center Boston	Sonic Youth	
September 1, 2000	Camden	United States	Blockbuster Music Entertainment Centre	Sonic Youth	
September 2, 2000	Camden	United States	Blockbuster Music Entertainment Centre	Sonic Youth	
September 4, 2000	Columbia	United States	Merriweather Post Pavilion		
September 5, 2000	Burgettstown	United States	Post-Gazette Pavilion	Lee Ranaldo, Steve Shelley, and Jim O'Rourke	
North America leg 2
October 4, 2000	Montreal	Canada	Molson Centre	Supergrass	
October 5, 2000	Toronto	Canada	Air Canada Centre	Supergrass	
October 7, 2000	Auburn Hills	United States	The Palace of Auburn Hills	Supergrass	10/7/00 – Detroit, Michigan
October 8, 2000	East Troy	United States	Alpine Valley Music Theatre	Supergrass	
October 9, 2000	Rosemont	United States	Allstate Arena	Supergrass	10/9/00 – Chicago, Illinois
October 11, 2000	Maryland Heights	United States	Riverport Amphitheater	Supergrass	
October 12, 2000	Bonner Springs	United States	Sandstone Amphitheater	Supergrass	
October 14, 2000	The Woodlands	United States	Cynthia Woods Mitchell Pavilion	Supergrass	
October 15, 2000	The Woodlands	United States	Cynthia Woods Mitchell Pavilion	Supergrass	
October 17, 2000	Dallas	United States	Smirnoff Music Centre	Supergrass	
October 18, 2000	Lubbock	United States	United Spirit Arena	Supergrass	
October 20, 2000	Albuquerque	United States	Mesa del Sol Amphitheatre	Supergrass	
October 21, 2000	Phoenix	United States	Desert Sky Pavilion	Supergrass	
October 22, 2000	Las Vegas	United States	MGM Grand Arena	Supergrass	10/22/00 – Las Vegas, Nevada
October 24, 2000	Los Angeles	United States	Greek Theatre	Supergrass	
October 25, 2000	San Diego	United States	San Diego Sports Arena	Supergrass	10/25/00 – San Diego, California
October 27, 2000	Fresno	United States	Selland Arena	Supergrass	
October 28, 2000	San Bernardino	United States	Glen Helen Amphitheater	Supergrass	
October 30, 2000	Wheatland	United States	Sacramento Valley Amphitheater	Supergrass	
October 31, 2000	Mountain View	United States	Shoreline Amphitheatre	Supergrass	
November 2, 2000	Portland	United States	Rose Garden Arena	Supergrass	
November 3, 2000	Nampa	United States	Idaho Center	Supergrass	11/3/00 – Boise, Idaho
November 5, 2000	Seattle	United States	KeyArena	Supergrass, Red Hot Chili Peppers	
November 6, 2000	Seattle	United States	KeyArena	Red Hot Chili Peppers, Wellwater Conspiracy	11/6/00 – Seattle, Washington

== Band members ==
- Jeff Ament – bass guitar
- Stone Gossard – rhythm guitar, lead guitar
- Mike McCready – lead guitar
- Eddie Vedder – lead vocals, guitar
- Matt Cameron – drums

== Songs performed ==
Originals

- "Alive"
- "Animal"
- "Better Man"
- "Black"
- "Brain of J."
- "Breakerfall"
- "Breath"
- "Corduroy"
- "Daughter"
- "Dead Man"
- "Dissident"
- "Do the Evolution"
- "Elderly Woman Behind the Counter in a Small Town"
- "Evacuation"
- "Even Flow"
- "Faithfull"
- "Footsteps"
- "Garden"
- "Given to Fly"
- "Go"
- "Gods' Dice"
- "Grievance"
- "Habit"
- "Hail, Hail"
- "I Got Id"
- "Immortality"
- "In Hiding"
- "In My Tree"
- "Indifference"
- "Insignificance"
- "Jeremy"
- "Last Exit"
- "Leatherman"
- "Light Years"
- "Long Road"
- "Lukin"
- "Mankind"
- "MFC"
- "Not for You"
- "Nothing as It Seems"
- "Nothingman"
- "Oceans"
- "Of the Girl"
- "Off He Goes"
- "Once"
- "Parting Ways"
- "Pilate"
- "Porch"
- "Present Tense"
- "Rearviewmirror"
- "Red Mosquito"
- "Release"
- "Rival"
- "Sleight of Hand"
- "Smile"
- "Sometimes"
- "Soon Forget"
- "Spin the Black Circle"
- "State of Love and Trust"
- "Thin Air"
- "Tremor Christ"
- "U"
- "Untitled"
- "W.M.A." (snippet)
- "Wash"
- "Whipping"
- "Wishlist"
- "Yellow Ledbetter"

Covers

- "Androgynous Mind" (Sonic Youth) (snippet)
- "Another Brick in the Wall" (Pink Floyd) (snippet)
- "Baba O'Riley" (The Who)
- "Beautiful Way" (Beck) (snippet)
- "Beginning to See the Light" (The Velvet Underground) (snippet)
- "Behind Blue Eyes" (The Who) (snippet)
- "Bull in the Heather" (Sonic Youth) (snippet)
- "Can't Help Falling in Love" (Elvis Presley)
- "Crazy Mary" (Victoria Williams)
- "Crown of Thorns" (Mother Love Bone)
- "Don't Be Shy" (Cat Stevens)
- "Everyday" (Buddy Holly)
- "Fuckin' Up" (Neil Young)
- "Hold On" (Tom Waits) (snippet)
- "I Am a Patriot" (Steven Van Zandt)
- "I Believe in Miracles" (Ramones) (snippet)
- "I Got You" (Split Enz)
- "In the Colosseum" (Tom Waits) (snippet)
- "In the Mood" (Robert Plant) (snippet)
- "Interstellar Overdrive" (Pink Floyd) (snippet)
- "It's OK" (Dead Moon) (snippet)
- "Jumpin' Jack Flash" (The Rolling Stones) (snippet)
- "The Kids Are Alright" (The Who)
- "Last Kiss" (Wayne Cochran)
- "Leaving Here" (Edward Holland, Jr.)
- "Little Wing" (The Jimi Hendrix Experience) (snippet)
- "Love Me Two Times" (The Doors) (snippet)
- "Naked Eye" (The Who)
- "'O sole mio" (Giovanni Capurro and Eduardo di Capua) (snippet)
- "On a Rope" (Rocket from the Crypt) (snippet)
- "Over the Hills and Far Away" (Led Zeppelin) (snippet)
- "Rockin' in the Free World" (Neil Young)
- "Romanza" (anonymous) (snippet)
- "Save It for Later" (The Beat) (snippet)
- "Soldier of Love (Lay Down Your Arms)" (Arthur Alexander)
- "Sonic Reducer" (The Dead Boys)
- "Stop Your Sobbing" (The Kinks) (snippet)
- "Substitute" (The Who) (snippet)
- "Sympathy for the Devil" (The Rolling Stones) (snippet)
- "Timeless Melody" (The La's)
- "Throw Your Arms Around Me" (Hunters & Collectors)
- "Trouble" (Cat Stevens)
- "Without Your Love" (Roger Daltrey) (snippet)
- "The Wrong Child" (R.E.M.) (snippet)

== Gallery ==
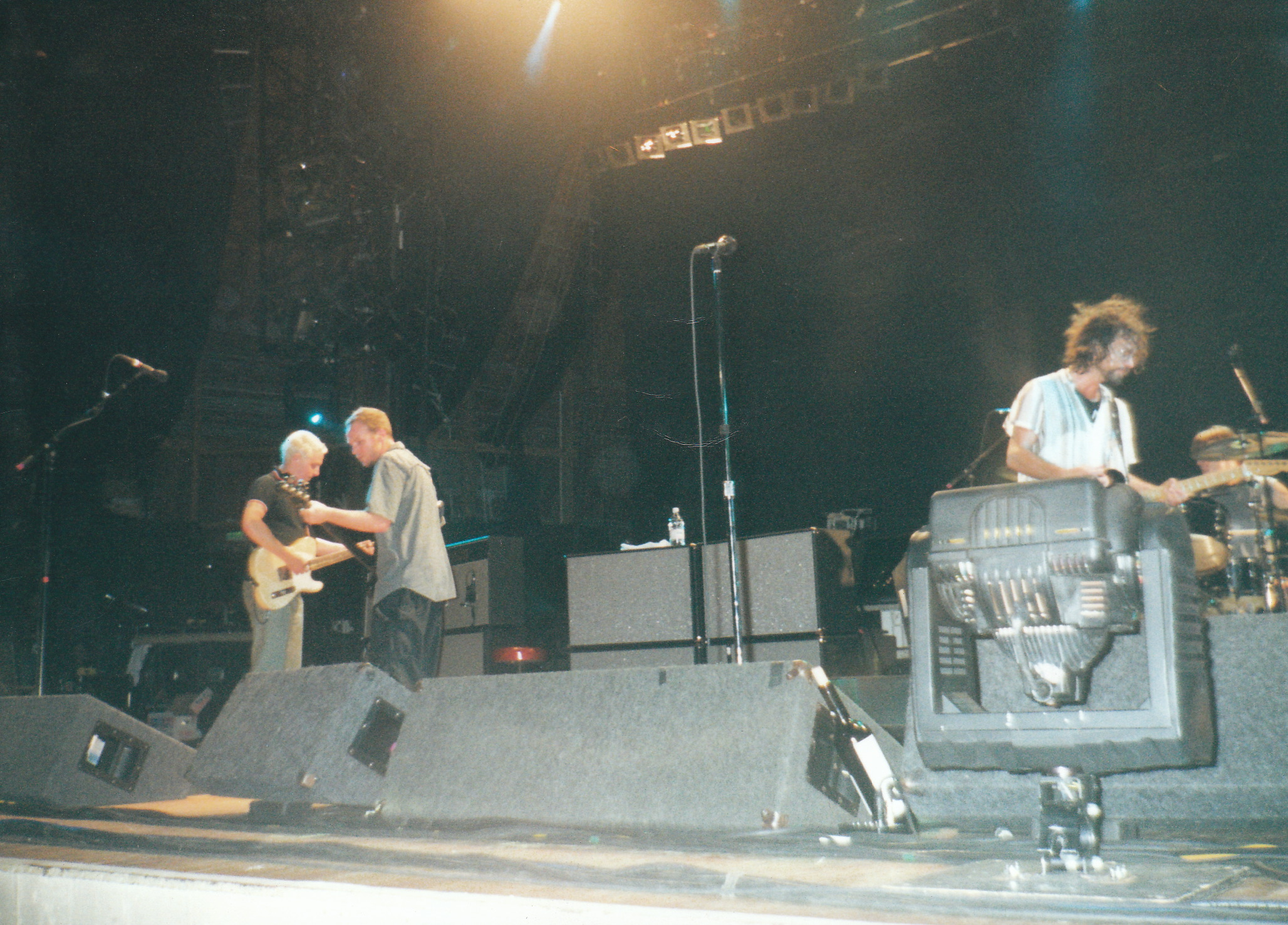
Pearl Jam in Columbia, Maryland on September 4, 2000.

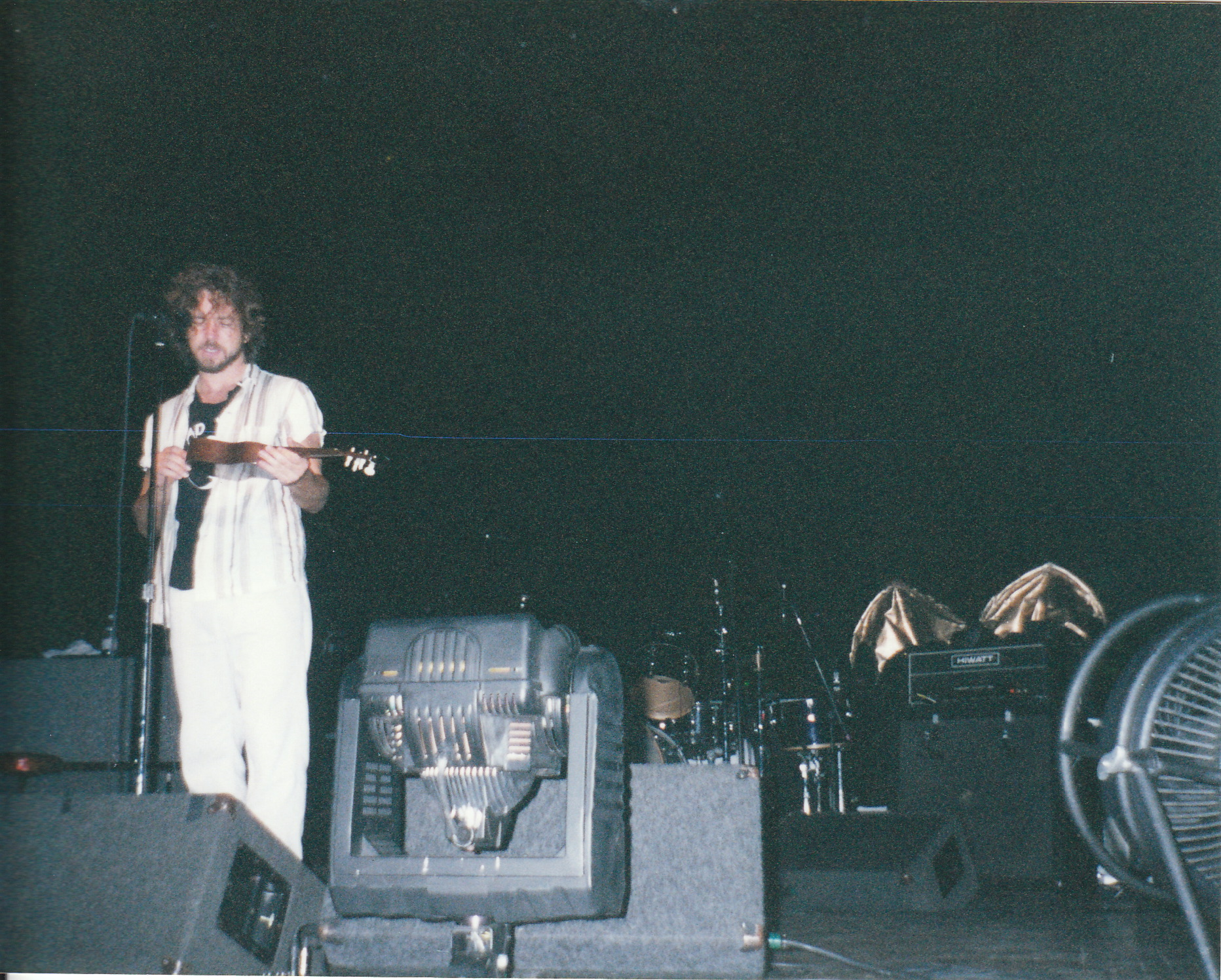
Eddie Vedder on stage with Pearl Jam in Columbia, Maryland on September 4, 2000.

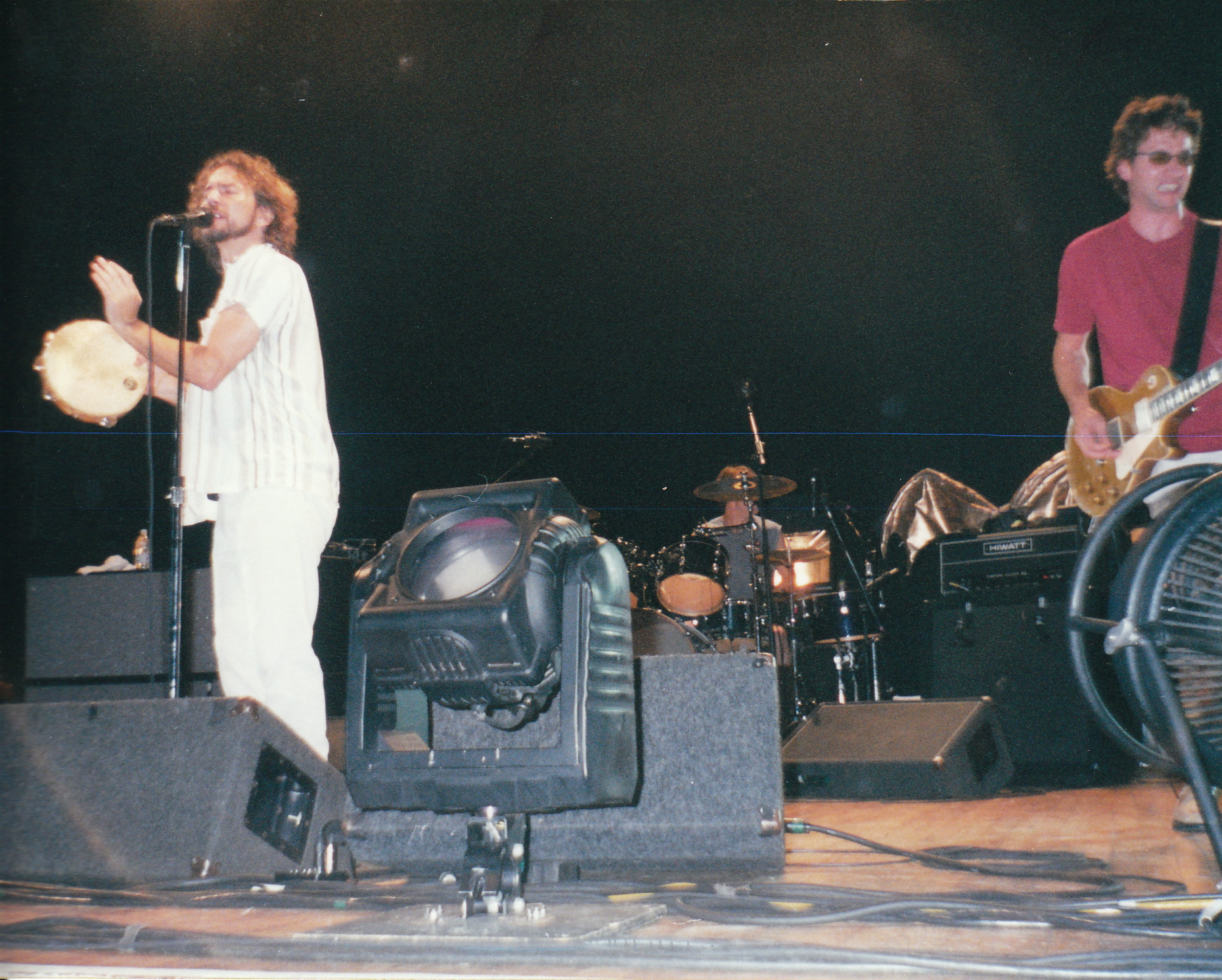
Pearl Jam in Columbia, Maryland on September 4, 2000.

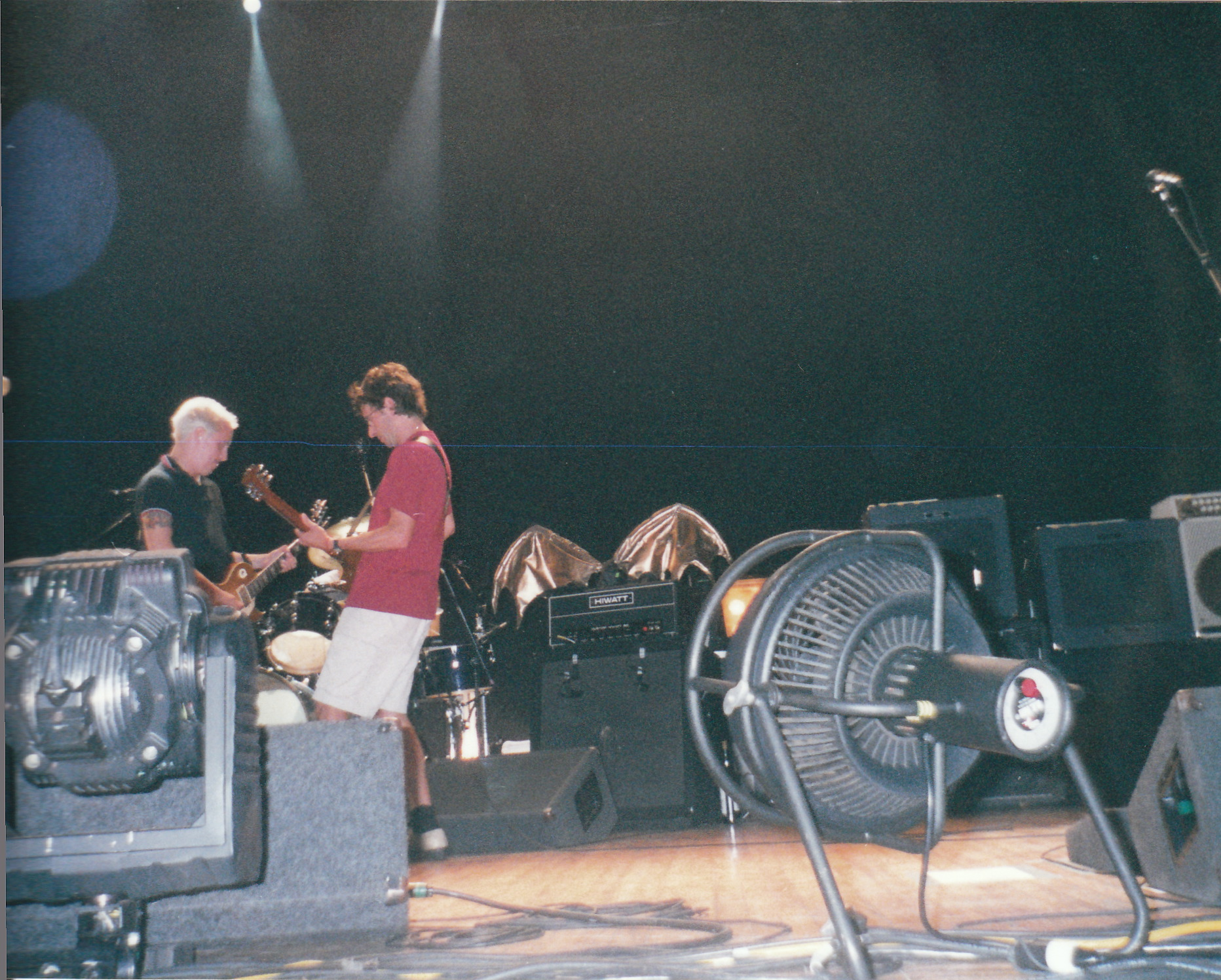
Pearl Jam in Columbia, Maryland on September 4, 2000.

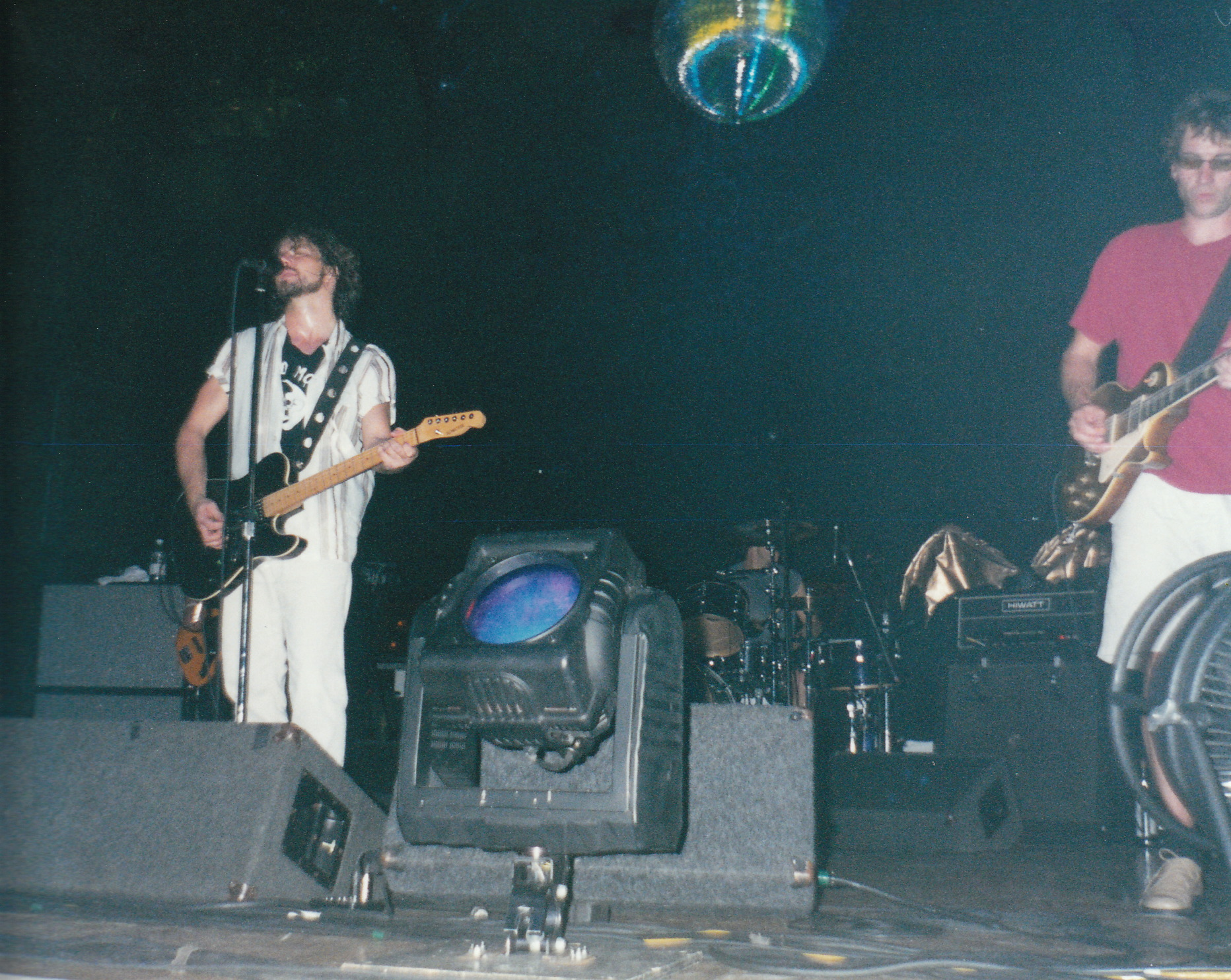
Pearl Jam in Columbia, Maryland on September 4, 2000.

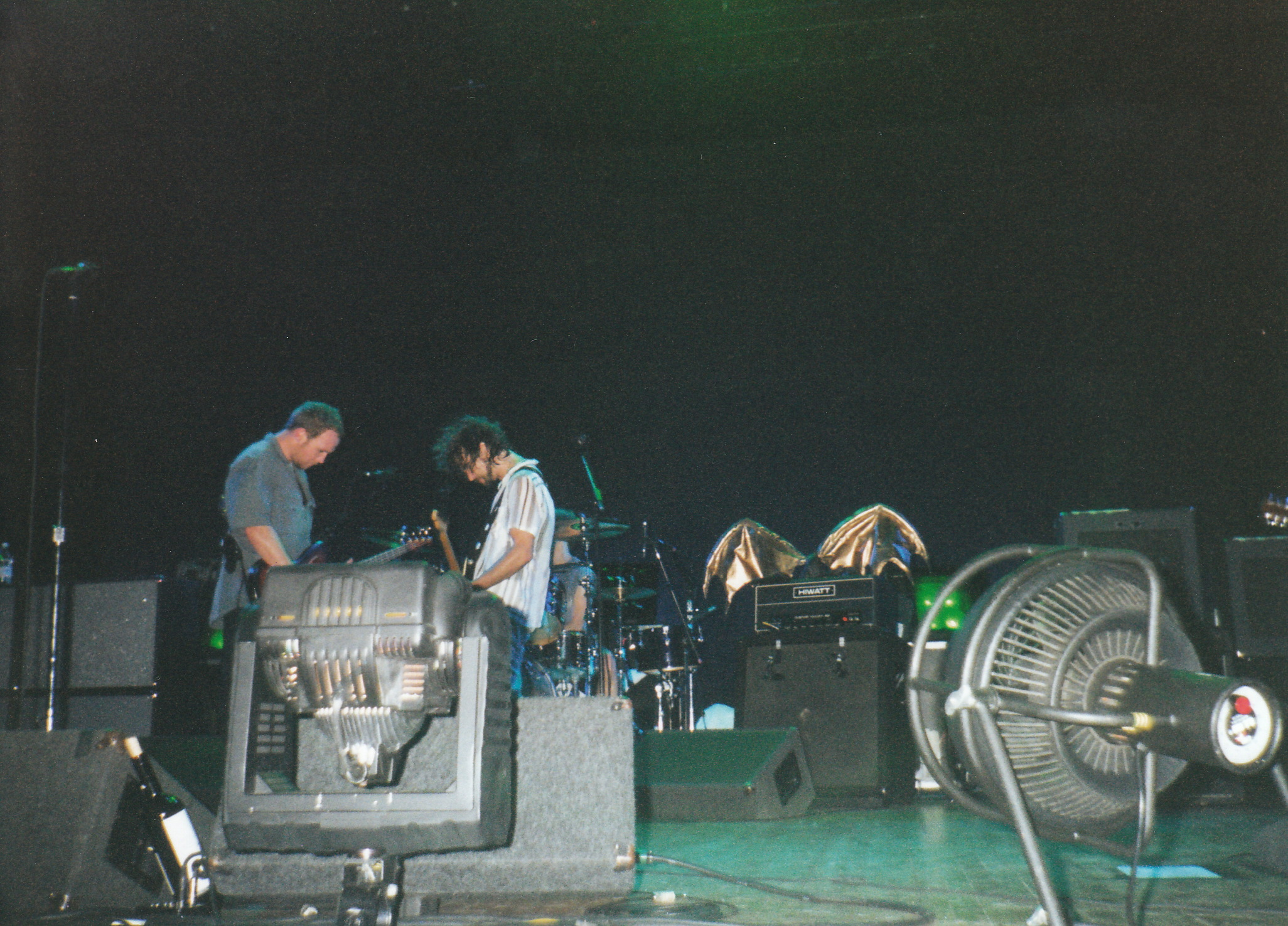
Pearl Jam in Columbia, Maryland on September 4, 2000.

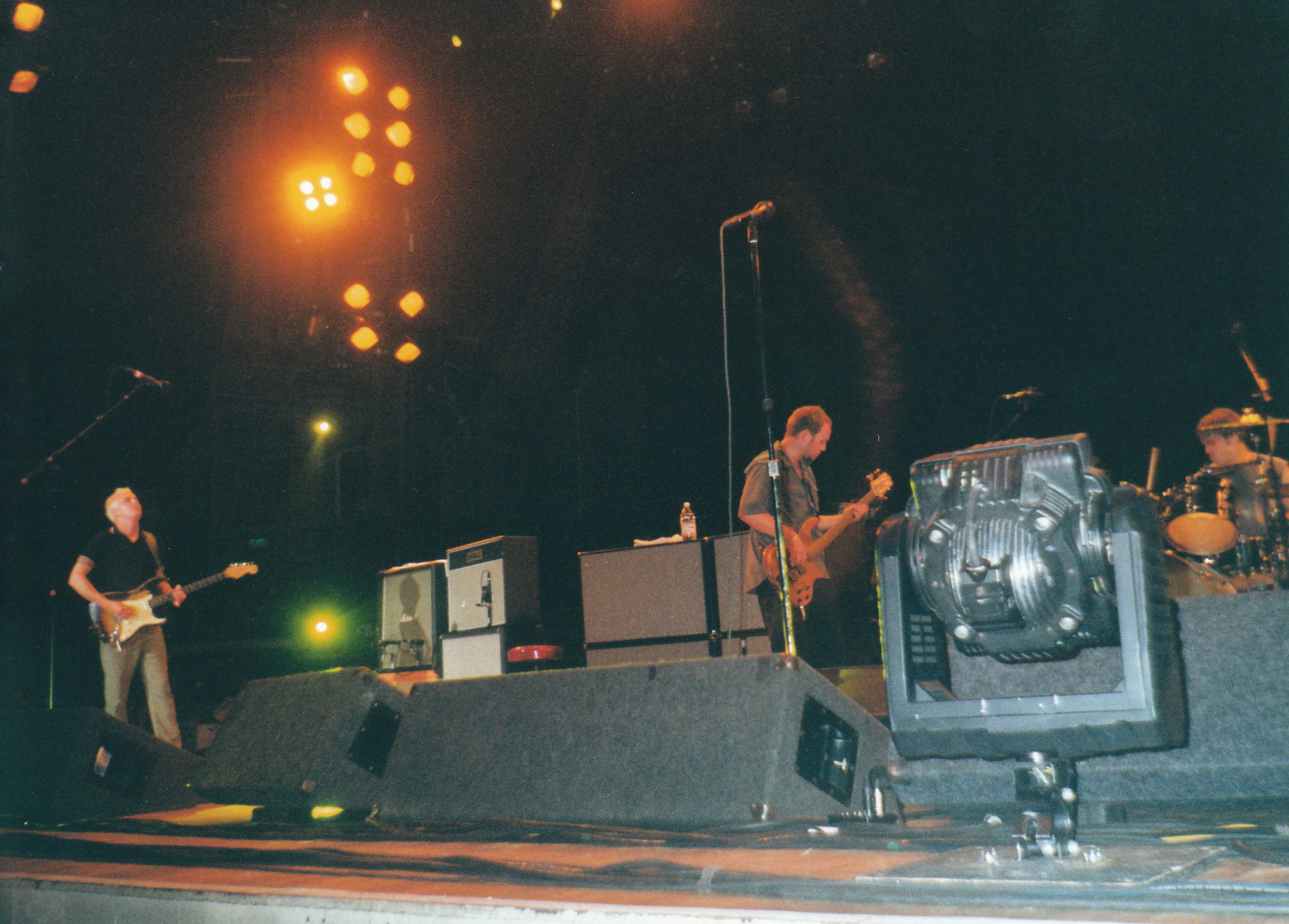
Pearl Jam in Columbia, Maryland on September 4, 2000.

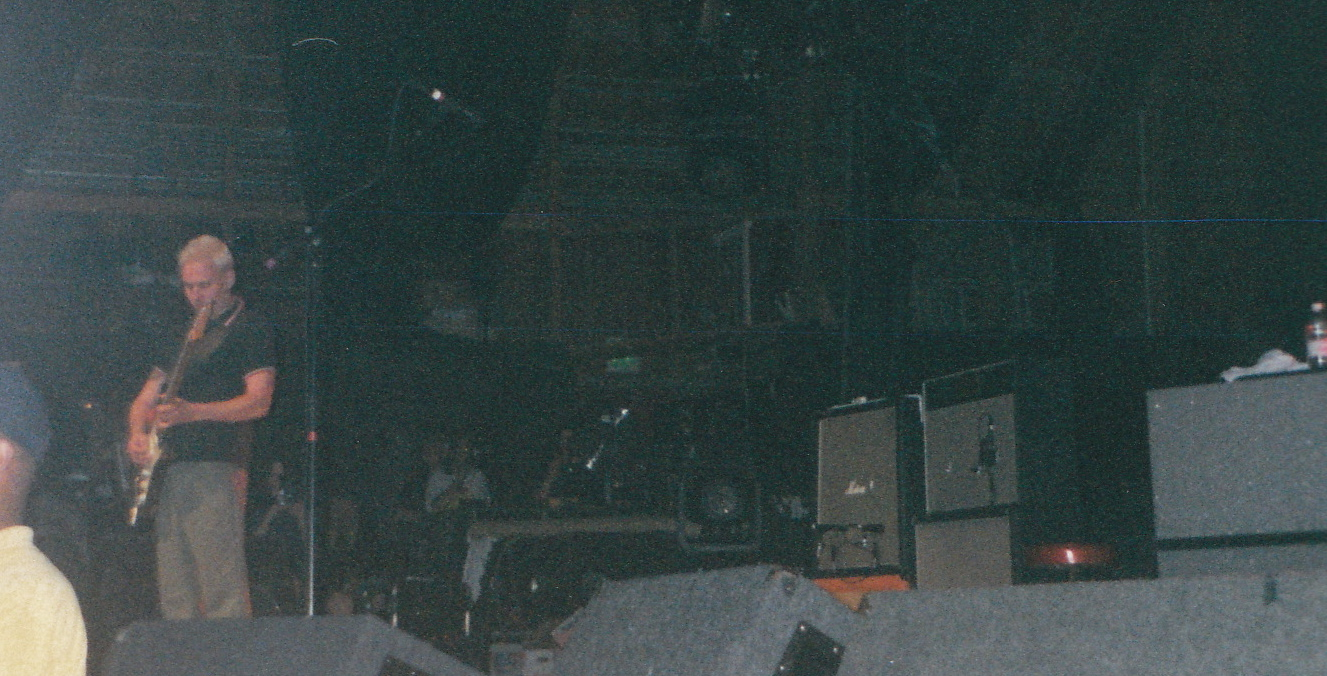
Mike McCready on stage with Pearl Jam in Columbia, Maryland on September 4, 2000.

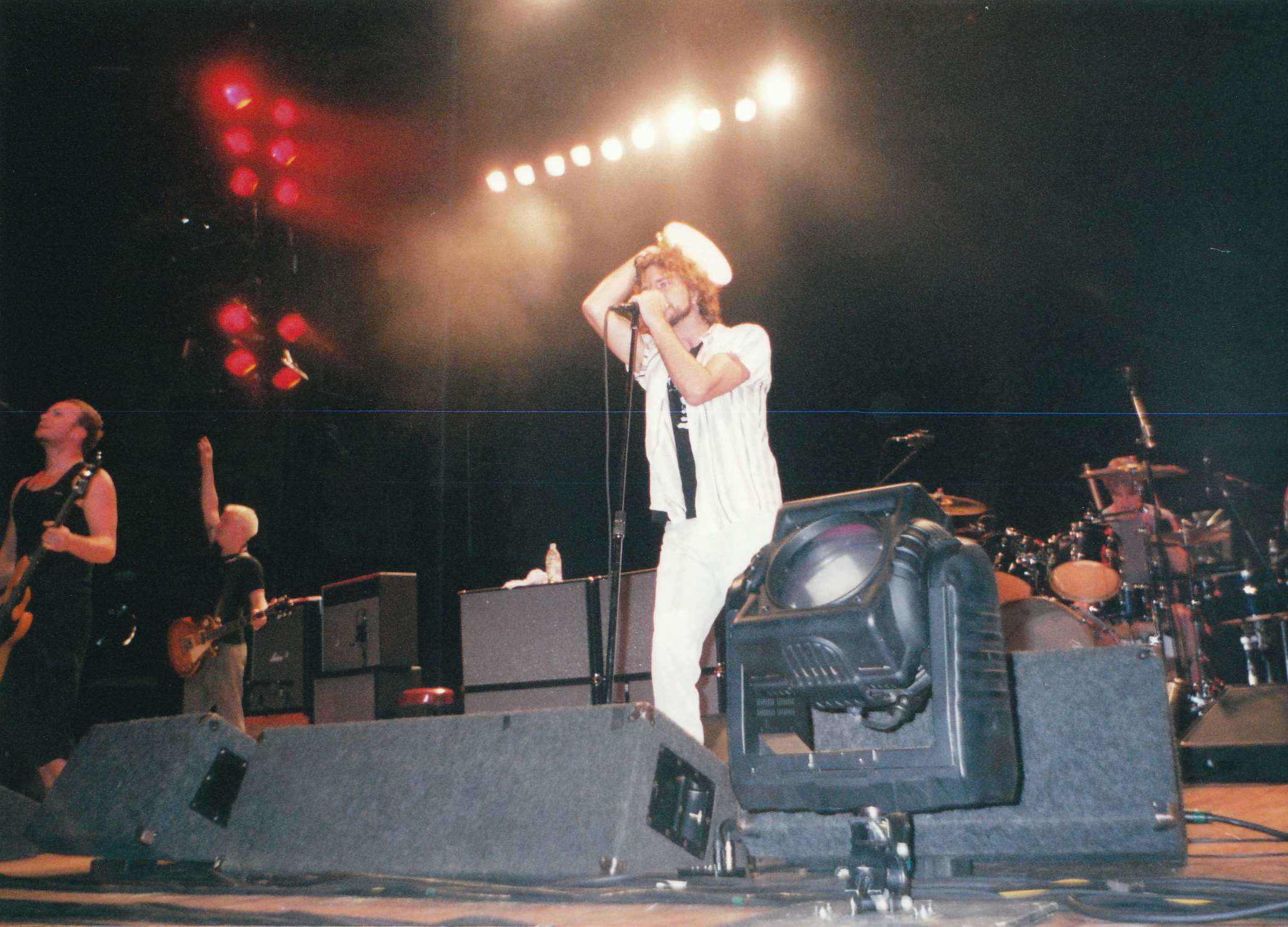
Pearl Jam in Columbia, Maryland on September 4, 2000.
