= 5/30/00 – London, England =

Live album by Pearl Jam
- Released: September 26, 2000
- Recorded: May 30, 2000; Wembley Arena, London, England, United Kingdom
- Genre: Alternative rock
- Length: 120:12
- Language: English
- Label: Epic

Pearl Jam chronology
5/29/00 – London, England (2000)	5/30/00 – London, England (2000)	6/1/00 –- Dublin, Ireland (2000)

5/30/00 – London, England is a two-disc live album and the fifth in a series of 72 live bootlegs released by the American alternative rock band Pearl Jam from the band's 2000 Binaural Tour. It was released along with the other official bootlegs from the European leg of the tour on September 26, 2000.

== Overview ==
The album was recorded on May 30, 2000, in London, England, at the world-famous live entertainment venue Wembley Arena. It was selected by the band as one of 18 "Ape/Man" shows from the tour, which, according to bassist Jeff Ament, were shows the band found "really exciting." Allmusic gave it three out of a possible five stars. Allmusic staff writer Steven Jacobetz said it is "the best show thus far on the tour five shows in. However, in the big picture, a concert which is not one of the best of the European tour and not essential." It debuted at number 137 on the Billboard 200 album chart.

== Track listing ==
Disc One
No.	Title	Writer(s)	Length
1.	"Sometimes"	Eddie Vedder	3:24
2.	"Grievance"	Vedder	3:11
3.	"Corduroy"	Dave Abbruzzese, Jeff Ament, Stone Gossard, Mike McCready, Vedder	4:48
4.	"Hail, Hail"	Gossard, Vedder, Ament, McCready	3:44
5.	"Animal"	Abbruzzese, Ament, Gossard, McCready, Vedder	2:54
6.	"Dissident"	Abbruzzese, Ament, Gossard, McCready, Vedder	3:55
7.	"Nothing as It Seems"	Ament	6:04
8.	"In Hiding"	Gossard, Vedder	5:47
9.	"Even Flow"	Vedder, Gossard	6:19
10.	"Thin Air"	Gossard	3:43
11.	"Habit"	Vedder	4:26
12.	"Untitled"	Vedder	1:53
13.	"MFC"	Vedder	2:55
14.	"Off He Goes"	Vedder	5:51
15.	"Daughter"	Abbruzzese, Ament, Gossard, McCready, Vedder	6:26

Disc Two
No.	Title	Writer(s)	Length
1.	"Not for You"	Abbruzzese, Ament, Gossard, McCready, Vedder	5:49
2.	"State of Love and Trust"	Vedder, McCready, Ament	3:48
3.	"Immortality"	Abbruzzese, Ament, Gossard, McCready, Vedder	6:32
4.	"Rearviewmirror"	Abbruzzese, Ament, Gossard, McCready, Vedder	5:57
5.	"Encore Break"		1:59
6.	"Light Years"	Gossard, McCready, Vedder	5:03
7.	"Do the Evolution"	Gossard, Vedder	3:43
8.	"Last Exit"	Abbruzzese, Ament, Gossard, McCready, Vedder	3:03
9.	"Elderly Woman Behind the Counter in a Small Town"	Abbruzzese, Ament, Gossard, McCready, Vedder	4:07
10.	"Black"	Vedder, Gossard	6:57
11.	"Alive"	Vedder, Gossard	7:54

== Personnel ==
Pearl Jam

- Jeff Ament – bass guitar, design concept
- Matt Cameron – drums
- Stone Gossard – guitars
- Mike McCready – guitars
- Eddie Vedder – vocals, guitars

Production

- John Burton – engineering
- Brett Eliason – mixing
- Brad Klausen – design and layout

== Chart positions ==
Chart (2000)	Position
Belgian Albums Chart (Vl)	50
US Billboard 200	137
UK Albums Chart	172
