= 8/21/00 – Columbus, Ohio =

Live album by Pearl Jam
- Released: February 27, 2001
- Recorded: August 21, 2000, Polaris Amphitheater, Columbus, Ohio, United States
- Genre: Alternative rock
- Length: 123:41
- Language: English
- Label: Epic

Pearl Jam chronology
8/20/00 – Cincinnati, Ohio (2001)	8/21/00 – Columbus, Ohio (2001)	8/23/00 – Jones Beach, New York (2001)

Professional ratings
Review scores
Source	Rating
Allmusic	1.5/5 stars

8/21/00 – Columbus, Ohio is a two-disc live album and the thirty-eighth in a series of 72 live bootlegs released by the American alternative rock band Pearl Jam from the band's 2000 Binaural Tour. It was released along with the other official bootlegs from the first North American leg of the tour on February 27, 2001.

== Overview ==
The album was recorded on August 21, 2000, in Columbus, Ohio at Polaris Amphitheater. It was selected by the band as one of 18 "Ape/Man" shows from the tour, which, according to bassist Jeff Ament, were shows the band found "really exciting." Allmusic gave it one and a half out of a possible five stars. Allmusic staff writer Zac Johnson said, "When undertaking a project of this magnitude, there are bound to be 'off' nights in amongst the remarkable shows, and, unfortunately, this seems to be one of them."

== Track listing ==
=== Disc one ===
1. "Breakerfall" (Eddie Vedder) – 3:41
2. "Whipping" (Dave Abbruzzese, Jeff Ament, Stone Gossard, Mike McCready, Vedder) – 2:35
3. "Spin the Black Circle" (Abbruzzese, Ament, Gossard, McCready, Vedder) – 2:47
4. "Hail, Hail" (Gossard, Vedder, Ament, McCready) – 3:13
5. "Corduroy" (Abbruzzese, Ament, Gossard, McCready, Vedder) – 4:24
6. "In My Tree" (Gossard, Jack Irons, Vedder) – 4:30
7. "Dissident" (Abbruzzese, Ament, Gossard, McCready, Vedder) – 3:35
8. "Given to Fly" (McCready, Vedder) – 4:12
9. "Nothing as It Seems" (Ament) – 6:02
10. "Grievance" (Vedder) – 3:09
11. "Light Years" (Gossard, McCready, Vedder) – 4:53
12. "Daughter" (Abbruzzese, Ament, Gossard, McCready, Vedder) – 7:37
13. "Lukin" (Vedder) – 1:04
14. "Wishlist" (Vedder) – 4:02
15. "Off He Goes" (Vedder) – 5:33
16. "Better Man" (Vedder) – 4:37
17. "State of Love and Trust" (Vedder, McCready, Ament) – 3:28

=== Disc two ===
1. "Insignificance" (Vedder) – 4:42
2. "Rearviewmirror" (Abbruzzese, Ament, Gossard, McCready, Vedder) – 7:24
3. "Encore Break" – 3:12
4. "Present Tense" (McCready, Vedder) – 5:54
5. "Last Exit" (Abbruzzese, Ament, Gossard, McCready, Vedder) – 2:36
6. "Once" (Vedder, Gossard) – 3:23
7. "Elderly Woman Behind the Counter in a Small Town" (Abbruzzese, Ament, Gossard, McCready, Vedder) – 4:37
8. "Leatherman" (Vedder) – 2:33
9. "Nothingman" (Vedder, Ament) – 4:25
10. "Porch" (Vedder) – 6:37
11. "Last Kiss" (Wayne Cochran) – 3:10
12. "Yellow Ledbetter" (Ament, McCready, Vedder) – 5:46

== Personnel ==
Pearl Jam

- Jeff Ament – bass guitar, design concept
- Matt Cameron – drums
- Stone Gossard – guitars
- Mike McCready – guitars
- Eddie Vedder – vocals, guitars

Production

- John Burton – engineering
- Brett Eliason – mixing
- Brad Klausen – design and layout
