= 8/7/00 – Atlanta, Georgia =

Live album by Pearl Jam
- Released: February 27, 2001
- Recorded: August 7, 2000, Philips Arena, Atlanta, Georgia, United States
- Genre: Alternative rock
- Length: 134:20
- Language: English
- Label: Epic

Pearl Jam chronology
8/6/00 – Greensboro, North Carolina (2001)	8/7/00 – Atlanta, Georgia (2001)	8/9/00 – West Palm Beach, Florida (2001)

Professional ratings
Review scores
Source	Rating
Allmusic	3/5 stars

8/7/00 – Atlanta, Georgia is a two-disc live album and the twenty-ninth in a series of 72 live bootlegs released by the American alternative rock band Pearl Jam from the band's 2000 Binaural Tour. It was released along with the other official bootlegs from the first North American leg of the tour on February 27, 2001.

== Overview ==
The album was recorded on August 7, 2000 in Atlanta, Georgia at Philips Arena. It was selected by the band as one of 18 "Ape/Man" shows from the tour, which, according to bassist Jeff Ament, were shows the band found "really exciting." Allmusic gave it three out of a possible five stars. Allmusic staff writer Zac Johnson said, "If it could have held its level of intensity, it would rank among the best in this series. Nevertheless it is still a terrific performance, one that fans will cherish."

== Track listing ==
=== Disc one ===
1. "Release" (Jeff Ament, Stone Gossard, Dave Krusen, Mike McCready, Eddie Vedder) – 5:25
2. "Corduroy" (Dave Abbruzzese, Ament, Gossard, McCready, Vedder) – 4:36
3. "Insignificance" (Vedder) – 4:25
4. "Animal" (Abbruzzese, Ament, Gossard, McCready, Vedder) – 2:47
5. "Hail, Hail" (Gossard, Vedder, Ament, McCready) – 5:07
6. "Nothing as It Seems" (Ament) – 5:43
7. "Rival" (Gossard) – 3:45
8. "Given to Fly" (McCready, Vedder) – 3:38
9. "Light Years" (Gossard, McCready, Vedder) – 4:49
10. "Do the Evolution" (Gossard, Vedder) – 3:52
11. "Even Flow" (Vedder, Gossard) – 5:20
12. "In Hiding" (Gossard, Vedder) – 7:39
13. "Daughter" (Abbruzzese, Ament, Gossard, McCready, Vedder) – 8:28
14. "Better Man" (Vedder) – 4:46

=== Disc two ===
1. "Nothingman" (Vedder, Ament) – 5:22
2. "Leatherman" (Vedder) – 2:19
3. "Grievance" (Vedder) – 3:14
4. "Rearviewmirror" (Abbruzzese, Ament, Gossard, McCready, Vedder) – 7:16
5. "Encore Break" – 1:18
6. "Once" (Vedder, Gossard) – 3:19
7. "Breakerfall" (Vedder) – 4:27
8. "Immortality" (Abbruzzese, Ament, Gossard, McCready, Vedder) – 7:28
9. "Crazy Mary" (Victoria Williams) – 6:37
10. "Elderly Woman Behind the Counter in a Small Town" (Abbruzzese, Ament, Gossard, McCready, Vedder) – 3:55
11. "Porch" (Vedder) – 3:58
12. "Fuckin' Up" (Neil Young) – 8:22
13. "Yellow Ledbetter" (Ament, McCready, Vedder) – 6:25

== Personnel ==
Pearl Jam

- Jeff Ament – bass guitar, design concept
- Matt Cameron – drums
- Stone Gossard – guitars
- Mike McCready – guitars
- Eddie Vedder – vocals, guitars

Production

- John Burton – engineering
- Brett Eliason – mixing
- Brad Klausen – design and layout
