= 6/16/00 – Katowice, Poland =

16/6/00 – Katowice, Poland

Live album by Pearl Jam
- Released: September 26, 2000
- Recorded: June 16, 2000; Spodek, Katowice, Poland
- Genre: Alternative rock
- Length: 144:51
- Language: English
- Label: Epic

Pearl Jam chronology
6/15/00 – Katowice, Poland (2000)	16/6/00 – Katowice, Poland (2000)	6/18/00 – Salzburg, Austria (2000)

6/16/00 – Katowice, Poland is a two-disc live album and the sixteenth in a series of 72 live bootlegs released by the American alternative rock band Pearl Jam from the band's 2000 Binaural Tour. It was released along with the other official bootlegs from the European leg of the tour on September 26, 2000.

== Overview ==
The album was recorded on June 16, 2000 in Katowice, Poland at the multipurpose arena Spodek. It was selected by the band as one of 18 "Ape/Man" shows from the tour, which, according to bassist Jeff Ament, were shows the band found "really exciting." Allmusic gave it four out of a possible five stars. Allmusic staff writer Steven Jacobetz said, "A special and memorable night recognized by the band and fans alike as one of the best of the year." It debuted at number 103 on the Billboard 200 album chart.

== Track listing ==
=== Disc one ===
1. "Release" (Jeff Ament, Stone Gossard, Dave Krusen, Mike McCready, Eddie Vedder) – 4:49
2. "Of the Girl" (Gossard) – 6:42
3. "Sleight of Hand" (Ament, Vedder) – 4:56
4. "Thin Air" (Gossard) – 3:48
5. "Insignificance" (Vedder) – 4:38
6. "Grievance" (Vedder) – 3:17
7. "Corduroy" (Dave Abbruzzese, Ament, Gossard, McCready, Vedder) – 5:21
8. "Animal" (Abbruzzese, Ament, Gossard, McCready, Vedder) – 2:58
9. "Hail, Hail" (Gossard, Vedder, Ament, McCready) – 3:25
10. "State of Love and Trust" (Vedder, McCready, Ament) – 3:49
11. "Evacuation" (Matt Cameron, Vedder) – 3:06
12. "Daughter" (Abbruzzese, Ament, Gossard, McCready, Vedder) – 7:31
13. "Jeremy" (Vedder, Ament) – 6:06
14. "I Got Id" (Vedder) – 4:32
15. "Light Years" (Gossard, McCready, Vedder) – 5:13
16. "Leatherman" (Vedder) – 2:29

=== Disc two ===
1. "In Hiding" (Gossard, Vedder) – 5:56
2. "Off He Goes" (Vedder) – 6:09
3. "Dissident" (Abbruzzese, Ament, Gossard, McCready, Vedder) – 4:53
4. "MFC" (Vedder) – 2:27
5. "Habit" (Vedder) – 4:09
6. "Alive" (Vedder, Gossard) – 5:26
7. "Encore Break" – 3:20
8. "Smile" (Ament, Vedder) – 4:29
9. "Immortality" (Abbruzzese, Ament, Gossard, McCready, Vedder) – 6:54
10. "Black" (Vedder, Gossard) – 7:44
11. "Leaving Here" (Brian Holland, Lamont Dozier, Edward Holland, Jr.) – 3:00
12. "Soldier of Love (Lay Down Your Arms)" (Buzz Cason, Tony Moon) – 2:54
13. "Last Exit" (Abbruzzese, Ament, Gossard, McCready, Vedder) – 4:26
14. "Soon Forget" (Vedder) – 2:24
15. "Yellow Ledbetter" (Ament, McCready, Vedder) – 8:00

== Personnel ==
Pearl Jam

- Jeff Ament – bass guitar, design concept
- Matt Cameron – drums
- Stone Gossard – guitars
- Mike McCready – guitars
- Eddie Vedder – vocals, guitars, ukulele

Production

- John Burton – engineering
- Brett Eliason – mixing
- Brad Klausen – design and layout

== Chart positions ==
Chart (2000)	Position
US Billboard 200	103
