= 10/9/00 – Chicago, Illinois =

Live album by Pearl Jam
- Released: March 27, 2001
- Recorded: October 9, 2000, Allstate Arena, Rosemont, Illinois, United States
- Genre: Alternative rock
- Length: 144:17
- Language: English
- Label: Epic

Pearl Jam chronology
10/8/00 – East Troy, Wisconsin (2001)	10/9/00 – Chicago, Illinois (2001)	10/11/00 – St. Louis, Missouri (2001)

Professional ratings
Review scores
Source	Rating
Allmusic	4/5 stars

10/9/00 – Chicago, Illinois is a two-disc live album and the fifty-third in a series of 72 live bootlegs released by the American alternative rock band Pearl Jam from the band's 2000 Binaural Tour. It was released along with the other official bootlegs from the second North American leg of the tour on March 27, 2001.

== Overview ==
The album was recorded on October 9, 2000, in Rosemont, Illinois at Allstate Arena. It was selected by the band as one of 18 "Ape/Man" shows from the tour, which, according to bassist Jeff Ament, were shows the band found "really exciting." Allmusic gave it four out of a possible five stars. Allmusic staff writer Steven Jacobetz said, "Overall, this night in the windy city was one to remember, and definitely a high-priority purchase in the 2000 bootleg series."

== Track listing ==
=== Disc one ===
1. "Release" (Jeff Ament, Stone Gossard, Dave Krusen, Mike McCready, Eddie Vedder) – 6:00
2. "Corduroy" (Dave Abbruzzese, Ament, Gossard, McCready, Vedder) – 4:28
3. "Grievance" (Vedder) – 4:27
4. "Gods' Dice" (Ament) – 2:27
5. "Animal" (Abbruzzese, Ament, Gossard, McCready, Vedder) – 2:41
6. "Red Mosquito" (Ament, Gossard, Jack Irons, McCready, Vedder) – 4:32
7. "Nothing as It Seems" (Ament) – 5:34
8. "Given to Fly" (McCready, Vedder) – 3:42
9. "Wishlist" (Vedder) – 4:04
10. "Elderly Woman Behind the Counter in a Small Town" (Abbruzzese, Ament, Gossard, McCready, Vedder) – 3:34
11. "In Hiding" (Gossard, Vedder) – 5:01
12. "Even Flow" (Vedder, Gossard) – 6:40
13. "Light Years" (Gossard, McCready, Vedder) – 5:31
14. "MFC" (Vedder) – 3:06
15. "Lukin" (Vedder) – 0:49
16. "Not for You" (Abbruzzese, Ament, Gossard, McCready, Vedder) – 5:34
17. "Better Man" (Vedder) – 4:10

=== Disc two ===
1. "Leatherman" (Vedder) – 2:39
2. "Nothingman" (Vedder, Ament) – 4:27
3. "Do the Evolution" (Gossard, Vedder) – 4:01
4. "Insignificance" (Vedder) – 4:33
5. "Black" (Vedder, Gossard) – 8:28
6. "Parting Ways" (Vedder) – 4:56
7. "Encore Break" – 2:05
8. "Sleight of Hand" (Ament, Vedder) – 4:36
9. "Soldier of Love (Lay Down Your Arms)" (Buzz Cason, Tony Moon) – 2:46
10. "Crazy Mary" (Victoria Williams) – 5:42
11. "Jeremy" (Vedder, Ament) – 4:49
12. "Rearviewmirror" (Abbruzzese, Ament, Gossard, McCready, Vedder) – 14:08
13. "Soon Forget" (Vedder) – 3:18
14. "Baba O'Riley" (Pete Townshend) – 5:29

== Personnel ==
Pearl Jam

- Jeff Ament – bass guitar, design concept
- Matt Cameron – drums
- Stone Gossard – guitars
- Mike McCready – guitars
- Eddie Vedder – vocals, guitars, ukulele

Production

- John Burton – engineering
- Brett Eliason – mixing
- Brad Klausen – design and layout
