= 10/7/00 – Detroit, Michigan =

2001 live "official bootleg" album by Pearl Jam

Live album by Pearl Jam
- Released: March 27, 2001
- Recorded: October 7, 2000, The Palace of Auburn Hills, Auburn Hills, Michigan, United States
- Genre: Alternative rock
- Length: 115:59
- Language: English
- Label: Epic

Pearl Jam chronology
10/5/00 – Toronto, Canada (2001)	10/7/00 – Detroit, Michigan (2001)	10/8/00 – East Troy, Wisconsin (2001)

Professional ratings
Review scores
Source	Rating
Allmusic	3/5 stars

10/7/00 – Detroit, Michigan is a two-disc live album and the fifty-first in a series of 72 live bootlegs released by the American alternative rock band Pearl Jam from the band's 2000 Binaural Tour. It was released along with the other official bootlegs from the second North American leg of the tour on March 27, 2001.

== Overview ==
The album was recorded on October 7, 2000 in Auburn Hills, Michigan at The Palace of Auburn Hills. It was selected by the band as one of 18 "Ape/Man" shows from the tour, which, according to bassist Jeff Ament, were shows the band found "really exciting." Allmusic gave it three out of a possible five stars. Allmusic staff writer Douglas Siwek said, "This is a great set in a series of 'bootlegs' that show Pearl Jam as one of the most accomplished bands of the modern rock era."

== Track listing ==
=== Disc one ===
1. "Go" (Dave Abbruzzese, Jeff Ament, Stone Gossard, Mike McCready, Eddie Vedder) – 3:52
2. "Corduroy" (Abbruzzese, Ament, Gossard, McCready, Vedder) – 4:31
3. "Grievance" (Vedder) – 3:14
4. "State of Love and Trust" (Vedder, McCready, Ament) – 3:38
5. "Tremor Christ" (Abbruzzese, Ament, Gossard, McCready, Vedder) – 4:58
6. "Elderly Woman Behind the Counter in a Small Town" (Abbruzzese, Ament, Gossard, McCready, Vedder) – 3:40
7. "Insignificance" (Vedder) – 4:29
8. "Last Exit" (Abbruzzese, Ament, Gossard, McCready, Vedder) – 2:48
9. "Animal" (Abbruzzese, Ament, Gossard, McCready, Vedder) – 2:44
10. "In My Tree" (Gossard, Jack Irons, Vedder) – 4:06
11. "I Got Id" (Vedder) – 4:18
12. "Better Man" (Vedder) – 6:25
13. "Even Flow" (Vedder, Gossard) – 6:39
14. "Daughter" (Abbruzzese, Ament, Gossard, McCready, Vedder) – 6:25
15. "Thin Air" (Gossard) – 3:44
16. "Jeremy" (Vedder, Ament) – 4:55

=== Disc two ===
1. "Given to Fly" (McCready, Vedder) – 4:02
2. "Rearviewmirror" (Abbruzzese, Ament, Gossard, McCready, Vedder) – 7:26
3. "Encore Break" – 2:56
4. "Nothing as It Seems" (Ament) – 6:17
5. "Last Kiss" (Wayne Cochran) – 3:12
6. "Spin the Black Circle" (Abbruzzese, Ament, Gossard, McCready, Vedder) – 3:09
7. "Crazy Mary" (Victoria Williams) – 5:17
8. "Parting Ways" (Vedder) – 6:38
9. "Fuckin' Up" (Neil Young) – 6:36

== Personnel ==
Pearl Jam

- Jeff Ament – bass guitar, design concept
- Matt Cameron – drums
- Stone Gossard – guitars
- Mike McCready – guitars
- Eddie Vedder – vocals, guitars

Production

- John Burton – engineering
- Brett Eliason – mixing
- Brad Klausen – design and layout
