= 8/29/00 – Boston, Massachusetts =

Live album by Pearl Jam
- Released: February 27, 2001
- Recorded: August 29, 2000, Tweeter Center Boston, Mansfield, Massachusetts, United States
- Genre: Alternative rock
- Length: 133:08
- Language: English
- Label: Epic

Pearl Jam chronology
8/27/00 – Saratoga, New York (2001)	8/29/00 – Boston, Massachusetts (2001)	8/30/00 – Boston, Massachusetts (2001)

Professional ratings
Review scores
Source	Rating
Allmusic	4/5 stars

8/29/00 – Boston, Massachusetts is a two-disc live album and the forty-third in a series of 72 live bootlegs released by the American alternative rock band Pearl Jam from the band's 2000 Binaural Tour. It was released along with the other official bootlegs from the first North American leg of the tour on February 27, 2001.

== Overview ==
The album was recorded on August 29, 2000, in Mansfield, Massachusetts at the Tweeter Center. It was selected by the band as one of 18 "Ape/Man" shows from the tour, which, according to bassist Jeff Ament, were shows the band found "really exciting." Allmusic gave it four out of a possible five stars. Allmusic staff writer Zac Johnson said, "By far one of the best releases in this series." It debuted at number 163 on the Billboard 200 album chart.

== Track listing ==
=== Disc one ===
1. "Of the Girl" (Stone Gossard) – 5:16
2. "Breakerfall" (Eddie Vedder) – 2:41
3. "Corduroy" (Dave Abbruzzese, Jeff Ament, Gossard, Mike McCready, Vedder) – 4:59
4. "Go" (Abbruzzese, Ament, Gossard, McCready, Vedder) – 2:55
5. "Gods' Dice" (Ament) – 2:28
6. "Even Flow" (Vedder, Gossard) – 5:18
7. "Given to Fly" (McCready, Vedder) – 4:14
8. "Nothing as It Seems" (Ament) – 7:51
9. "Grievance" (Vedder) – 3:24
10. "Untitled" (Vedder) – 2:23
11. "MFC" (Vedder) – 2:22
12. "Habit" (Vedder) – 4:37
13. "Wishlist" (Vedder) – 4:05
14. "Better Man" (Vedder) – 5:22
15. "Rival" (Gossard) – 3:47
16. "Sleight of Hand" (Ament, Vedder) – 4:57

=== Disc two ===
1. "Insignificance" (Vedder) – 4:39
2. "Porch" (Vedder) – 5:12
3. "Encore Break" – 3:58
4. "I Am a Patriot" (Little Steven) – 3:54
5. "Do the Evolution" (Gossard, Vedder) – 3:46
6. "Jeremy" (Vedder, Ament) – 5:21
7. "Once" (Vedder, Gossard) – 3:26
8. "Mankind" (Gossard) – 3:40
9. "Crazy Mary" (Victoria Williams) – 6:07
10. "Soldier of Love (Lay Down Your Arms)" (Buzz Cason, Tony Moon) – 2:50
11. "Rearviewmirror" (Abbruzzese, Ament, Gossard, McCready, Vedder) – 10:54
12. "Yellow Ledbetter" (Ament, McCready, Vedder) – 6:12
13. "Fuckin' Up" (Neil Young) – 6:30

== Personnel ==
Pearl Jam

- Jeff Ament – bass guitar, design concept
- Matt Cameron – drums
- Stone Gossard – guitars
- Mike McCready – guitars
- Eddie Vedder – vocals, guitars

Production

- John Burton – engineering
- Brett Eliason – mixing
- Brad Klausen – design and layout

== Chart positions ==
Chart (2001)	Position
US Billboard 200	163
