= Live on Two Legs =

Live album by Pearl Jam
- Released: November 24, 1998
- Recorded: June 24 – September 23, 1998, various venues
- Genres: Alternative rock, grunge
- Length: 71:17
- Language: English
- Label: Epic

Pearl Jam live albums chronology
Live on Two Legs (1998)	Live at Benaroya Hall (2004)

Professional ratings
Review scores
Source	Rating
AllMusic	3/5 stars
Robert Christgau	(2-star Honorable Mention)
Entertainment Weekly	A−
NME	(7/10)
Pitchfork Media	(6.1/10)
Rolling Stone	3/5 stars

Live on Two Legs is the first major live album by the American alternative rock band Pearl Jam, released on November 24, 1998, through Epic Records. The album has been certified platinum by the RIAA in the United States.

== Overview ==
Live on Two Legs consists of live performances of songs from different shows of the band's summer 1998 North American tour. Guitarist Mike McCready stated that the band released the live album due to the strength of Pearl Jam's shows on the tour. It debuted at number fifteen on the Billboard 200 album chart. Live on Two Legs has been certified platinum by the RIAA.

"Daughter" features vocalist Eddie Vedder singing lyrics to Neil Young's "Rockin' in the Free World" (as the band continues a quiet jam to "Daughter") along with lyrics to Pearl Jam's own "W.M.A." towards the end of the song. The album also contains Pearl Jam's rendition of Young's song "Fuckin' Up".

AllMusic staff writer Stephen Thomas Erlewine gave the album three out of five stars. He said that "Pearl Jam still sounds good, but they lack the wild energy that distinguished their early years. Professionalism has its good points, however, and it's true that Live on Two Legs is eminently listenable, thanks in no small part to a fine track selection...Live on Two Legs is a souvenir, a thank you to fans who have stood by throughout the years, and on those terms, it's successful." Entertainment Weekly reviewer David Browne gave the album an A−. He said, "Despite the band's continuing self-importance and fuzzy-around-the-edges arrangements, this set of uptight anthems ("Corduroy", "Better Man", "Go") packs a post-grunge wallop."

== Track listing ==
Information taken from various sources.

1. "Corduroy" (Eddie Vedder, Dave Abbruzzese, Jeff Ament, Stone Gossard, Mike McCready) – 5:05
  June 29, United Center (Chicago)
2. "Given to Fly" (McCready, Vedder) – 3:53
  July 14, The Forum (Inglewood, California)
3. "Hail, Hail" (Gossard, Ament, McCready, Vedder) – 3:43
  July 16, ARCO Arena (Sacramento, California)
4. "Daughter"/"Rockin' in the Free World"/"W.M.A." (Gossard, Vedder, Abbruzzese, Ament, McCready)/(Neil Young) – 6:47
  September 19, Constitution Hall (Washington, D.C.)
5. "Elderly Woman Behind the Counter in a Small Town" (Vedder, Abbruzzese, Ament, Gossard, McCready) – 3:49
  September 23, Coral Sky Amphitheatre (West Palm Beach, Florida)
6. "Untitled" (Vedder) – 2:02
  September 18, Merriweather Post Pavilion (Columbia, Maryland)
7. "MFC" (Vedder) – 2:28
  June 27, Alpine Valley Music Theatre (East Troy, Wisconsin)
8. "Go" (Abbruzzese, Vedder, Ament, Gossard, McCready) – 2:41
  September 8, Continental Airlines Arena (East Rutherford, New Jersey)
9. "Red Mosquito" (Ament, Gossard, Jack Irons, McCready, Vedder) – 4:02
  August 29, Blockbuster Music Entertainment Centre (Camden, New Jersey)
10. "Even Flow" (Gossard, Vedder) – 5:17
  mixed from August 25 and August 31 performances at Star Lake Amphitheatre (Burgettstown, Pennsylvania) and Hardee's Walnut Creek Amphitheatre (Raleigh, North Carolina), respectively
11. "Off He Goes" (Vedder) – 5:42
  July 14, The Forum (Inglewood, California)
12. "Nothingman" (Ament, Vedder) – 4:38
  July 3, Sandstone Amphitheater (Bonner Springs, Kansas)
13. "Do the Evolution" (Gossard, Vedder) – 3:45
  July 13, The Forum (Inglewood, California)
14. "Better Man" (Vedder) – 4:06
  June 24, Rushmore Civic Center Arena (Rapid City, South Dakota)
15. "Black" (Gossard, Vedder) – 6:55
  September 7, GTE Virginia Beach Amphitheater (Virginia Beach, Virginia)
16. "Fuckin' Up" (Young) – 6:17
  September 15, Great Woods (Mansfield, Massachusetts)

== Personnel ==
Pearl Jam

- Jeff Ament – bass guitar, layout, black and white portraits
- Matt Cameron – drums
- Stone Gossard – rhythm guitar, lead guitar, vocals
- Mike McCready – lead guitar, rhythm guitar
- Eddie Vedder – vocals, guitar; credited as "Jerome Turner" for layout

Production

- Barry Ament – layout, poster art
- Ames – layout
- Mark Atherton – layout, poster art
- John Burton, Sam Hofstedt – assistant engineering
- Kristin Callahan, Lance Mercer – color photos
- Vito Costarella, Hatch Show Prints, Ward Sutton, Nate Williams – poster art
- Brett Eliason – recording and mixing
- George Estrada – layout, poster art
- Joe Gastwirt – mastering
- Coby Schultz – layout, poster art

== Chart positions ==
=== Album ===
Chart (1998)	Peak position
Australian Albums (ARIA)	4
Belgian Albums (Ultratop Flanders)	42
Canadian Albums (RPM)	7
Dutch Albums (Album Top 100)	37
French Albums (SNEP)	59
German Albums (Offizielle Top 100)	6
New Zealand (RMNZ)	11
Norwegian Albums (VG-lista)	20
Scottish Albums (Official Charts)	89
UK Albums (OCC)	68
US Billboard 200	15

Chart (2022)	Peak position
Irish Albums (IRMA)	94

=== Singles ===
Single (1998)	Peak chart positions		
Single (1998)	US Main	US Mod	CAN
"Elderly Woman Behind the Counter in a Small Town" (live)	21	26	27

== Certifications ==
Region	Certification	Certified units/sales
Australia (ARIA)	Platinum	70,000^{^}
Canada (Music Canada)	Platinum	100,000^{^}
New Zealand (RMNZ)	Platinum	15,000^{^}
United States (RIAA)	Platinum	1,000,000^{^}
^{^} Shipments figures based on certification alone.
