= Binaural (album) =

Studio album by Pearl Jam
- Released: May 16, 2000
- Recorded: September 1999 – January 2000
- Studio: Studio Litho (Seattle)
- Genre: Post-punk; folk rock; neo-psychedelia
- Length: 52:05
- Label: Epic
- Producer: Tchad Blake; Pearl Jam

Pearl Jam chronology
Yield (1998)	Binaural (2000)	Riot Act (2002)

Singles from Binaural
- 1. "Nothing as It Seems" Released: April 25, 2000; 2. "Light Years" Released: July 10, 2000

Binaural is the sixth studio album by American rock band Pearl Jam, released May 16, 2000, through Epic Records. Following a full-scale tour in support of its previous album, Yield (1998), Pearl Jam took a short break before reconvening toward the end of 1999 to begin work on a new album. During the production of the album, the band encountered hindrances such as singer Eddie Vedder's writer's block, and guitarist Mike McCready's entrance into rehabilitation due to an addiction to prescription drugs. This is Pearl Jam's first album with former Soundgarden drummer Matt Cameron, who joined during 1998's Yield Tour to replace Jack Irons.

The music on the album featured an experimental sound, evident on songs that used binaural recording techniques. The atmospheric tracks, mostly featuring somber lyrics dealing with social criticism, led the band to convey these themes with images of nebulas in the album artwork. Binaural received positive reviews, and debuted at number two on the Billboard 200. Although the album was certified gold by the RIAA, it became the first Pearl Jam studio album to fail to reach Platinum status in the United States. The album's 2000 tour spawned a large collection of official bootleg releases.

== Recording ==
Similar to the process for Yield, the band members worked on material individually before starting the recording sessions together. Lead vocalist Eddie Vedder called the making of the album "a construction job." Binaural was the first album since the band's debut that was not produced by Brendan O'Brien. Gossard stated that the band "felt like it was time to try something new," and that they "were ready for a change." Instead the band hired producer Tchad Blake, known for his use of binaural recording. Binaural recording techniques, which employ two microphones to create a 3-D stereophonic sound, were used on several tracks, such as the acoustic "Of the Girl". Regarding Blake, Gossard said, "He was just there for us the whole time, wanting us to create different moods." This was the first Pearl Jam studio album following the departure of drummer Jack Irons, and features drummer Matt Cameron of Soundgarden, who had previously drummed on Pearl Jam's U.S. Yield Tour.

Binaural was recorded in late 1999 and early 2000 in Seattle, Washington, at Studio Litho, which is owned by guitarist Stone Gossard. The album was initially mixed at Sunset Sound Factory in Los Angeles, California, with Blake; however, the band proved to be dissatisfied with how the mixes turned out. According to McCready, Blake's work complemented the slower tracks such as "Nothing as It Seems" well, but faced trouble with others, which the band wanted to sound heavier. For the heavier songs, the group brought in former producer O'Brien, who remixed the tracks at his mixing facility at Southern Tracks in Atlanta, Georgia. It was with O'Brien that the band determined the final sequencing of the album.

During the writing and recording of the album, the band encountered several obstacles. Vedder has admitted that while working on the album he suffered from writer's block, which made it difficult for him to come up with lyrics. This inspired the hidden track "Writer's Block" - which consists of the sounds of a typewriter - that appears at the end of the album, starting at 6 minutes and 50 seconds on the track "Parting Ways". Vedder had written music for several songs, including "Insignificance" and "Grievance", but was having trouble coming up with lyrics for the songs. He decided to not write any more music, and to focus only on lyrics, even banning himself from playing guitar. Unable to write more lyrics, Vedder said he saw a ukulele and thought "that's not a guitar," and wrote the song "Soon Forget" using the ukulele. Guitarist Mike McCready went into rehabilitation to receive treatment for an addiction to prescription drugs. Gossard recalled that "everyone wasn't on the same page" due to McCready's absence and the familiarization with Cameron.

Three instrumentals featured on the Touring Band 2000 DVD ("Thunderclap", "Foldback", and "Harmony") come from the early Binaural sessions. Several songs were rejected from the album that eventually found their way on to the 2003 Lost Dogs collection of rarities. These include "Sad", "Hitchhiker", "In the Moonlight", "Education", "Fatal", and "Sweet Lew". "Sad", originally called "Letter to the Dead", was called "a great pop song" by Ament, but he said the song did not fit the album because the band does not "really [write] very many pop records." "Sweet Lew", about Kareem Abdul-Jabbar, was cut from Binaural because it did not fit the album according to Ament. "Fatal" was producer Tchad Blake's favorite song to come out of the recording sessions. "Strangest Tribe" and "Drifting" were also recorded around the time of the album's recording sessions, and both songs were released on the band's 1999 fan club Christmas single as well as Lost Dogs.

== Music and lyrics ==
"Nothing as It Seems"
A sample of "Nothing as It Seems", the first single released from the album. It is one of the songs on the album that utilized binaural recording techniques. The song was written by Ament and features prominent usage of his upright bass, giving the song an atmospheric feel.

"Light Years"
A sample of "Light Years", the second single released from the album. The song is a mid-tempo ballad and features lyrics written by Vedder mourning the loss of someone close.

Binaural opens with three up-tempo songs before growing more diverse. Vedder explained, "We'd rather challenge our fans and make them listen to our songs than give them something that's easy to digest. There is a lot of music out there that is very easy to digest but we never wanted to be part of it." As described by critic Jon Pareles on his review for Rolling Stone, Pearl Jam distances itself from the grunge that made them famous and "delve[s] elsewhere: jumpy post-punk and somber meditations, tightly wound folk rock and turbulent, neopsychedelic rockers that sound like they boiled out of jam sessions."

A few songs on the album show classic rock influences. The intro to the opening track "Breakerfall" uses a guitar riff similar to The Who song "I Can See for Miles" (from the 1967 album, The Who Sell Out). Additionally, "Soon Forget", which features Vedder playing a ukulele, is heavily influenced by The Who song "Blue, Red and Grey" (from the 1975 album, The Who by Numbers), with Vedder describing it as "30 seconds of plagiarising" and thanking Pete Townshend on the lyric sheet. The song "Nothing as It Seems" has been compared to the style of Pink Floyd.

Bassist Jeff Ament wrote lyrics for two songs on the album ("Gods' Dice" and "Nothing as It Seems"), and Gossard for three ("Thin Air", "Of the Girl" and "Rival"). The album is lyrically darker than the band's previous album Yield, with Gossard describing the lyrics as "pretty somber." Vedder addressed the social criticism contained in the album's lyrics by stating, "I think what everyone's looking for, y'know, is freedom...That's part of being comfortable in your own skin. I know I had a problem with being told what to do, and had a problem with being mentally and physically constricted. All of humanity is searching for freedom and I think it's important to know when you have it, too." Ament stated that "Gods' Dice" is about "judging anybody who has any sort of belief system whether they believe in God or not", and that "Nothing as It Seems" is about his childhood growing up in a rural area of Northern Montana. Vedder called "Evacuation" a "song about change", and stated in an interview that the moral of "Insignificance" is "the ineffectiveness of political struggle." Vedder took inspiration from the 1999 World Trade Organization protests in Seattle when writing "Grievance", and said the song is about the dangers of technology. Gossard has said that the song "Rival" is his reflection upon the 1999 Columbine High School massacre.

== Packaging ==
The album's cover art is a modified Hubble Space Telescope photo of the planetary nebula MyCn 18, popularly known as the Hourglass Nebula. Hubble Space Telescope photos of the Helix Nebula and Eagle Nebula are also featured in the inside cover and liner notes for this album, respectively. The photos were used with the permission of NASA. Regarding the artwork, Ament said, "The reason that we went with Tchad [Blake] is because he provides an amazing atmosphere to songs....So, I think we wanted the artwork to represent that....One of the themes that we've been exploring...is just realizing that in the big scheme of things, even the music that we make when we come together, no matter how powerful it is, it's still pretty minuscule. I think for me the whole space theme has a lot to do with scale. You know, you look at some of those pictures, and there are thirteen light years in four inches in that picture."

The album's title is a reference to the binaural recording techniques that were utilized on several tracks. Binaural literally means "having or relating to two ears." Regarding the choice of the title, Gossard said, "When we looked up the word 'binaural,' it meant to listen with both ears. So it seemed like a fitting title for the album."

== Release and reception ==
=== Commercial performance ===
Binaural sold 226,000 copies during its first week of release and debuted at number two on the Billboard 200 album chart. It was held off the top spot by the Britney Spears album, Oops!... I Did It Again. Binaural became the first Pearl Jam studio album to fail to reach Platinum status. Binaural has been certified gold by the Recording Industry Association of America (RIAA), and, as of 2013, has sold 850,000 copies in the United States according to Nielsen SoundScan. The album topped the charts in New Zealand, where it was certified Platinum, and Australia, where it went Platinum and ended as the 36th best-selling record of the year.

Two singles were released from Binaural. The lead single, "Nothing as It Seems", was issued on April 25, 2000, entered the Billboard Hot 100 at number 49, and reached number three on the Mainstream Rock charts. The album's other single, "Light Years", was released on July 10, 2000, and did not chart on the Hot 100, but it did place on the Mainstream Rock and Modern Rock charts.

=== Critical reception ===
Professional ratings
Aggregate scores
Source	Rating
Metacritic	69/100
Review scores
Source	Rating
AllMusic	4/5 stars
Robert Christgau	(1-star Honorable Mention)
Entertainment Weekly	B+
The Guardian	3/5 stars
Kerrang!	4/5 stars
NME	9/10
Q	3/5 stars
Rolling Stone	3.5/5 stars
Spin	7/10

Binaural received generally favorable reviews from music critics according to Metacritic, where it holds a 69 after 16 reviews. NME gave Binaural a nine out of 10. In the review, Binaural is called "a seething, furious album; a declamatory statement against cynicism and passivity and the simple injustices of everyday life" and that "even when the band slow the pace, the songs are coloured by a heartfelt intensity." AllMusic staff writer Stephen Thomas Erlewine said, "The songs are sharper, the production is layered, and the performances are as compassionate as ever, resulting in their finest album since Vitalogy." Time reviewer Christopher John Farley noted that the album is "less impatient and rage filled than much of Pearl Jam's earlier work." Farley added that "Pearl Jam, rather quietly, is building a long-term career to rival the rock legends of the past." Jim Farber of Entertainment Weekly gave the album a B+, considering that the "weighty subjects [give] Pearl Jam's introspective lyrics and stone-faced rock a refreshing edge" and adding that "if PJ long ago lost the zeitgeist, at least they've kept a hold on their hearts." Critic Robert Christgau described the album as "Rock as inner struggle, eternally externalized."

Spin gave the album seven out of 10 stars, writing that "Everything you want is still there—goofy experimentalism, guitar frenzy, Eddie's self-abusive wail. It's just more solid, more clear." Q gave the album three out of five stars, commenting that "Grunge may have died, but Pearl Jam it seems will never be slayed." Rolling Stone staff writer Jon Pareles gave the album three and a half out of five stars, feeling that the album "comes across as part of an extended conversation among the five band members...and fans loyal enough to check in for Pearl Jam's latest musings on love, death and social responsibility." The Guardian also gave the album three out of five stars, stating that Pearl Jam "are dignified, musicianly, sincere... and a teensy bit dull" and observing that "Vedder's affecting vocal angst drowns in a sea of pessimistic riffola." The review called Binaural "a warts-and-all album; it has grabbers, songs that sink in slowly and a few absolute duds." At the 2001 Grammy Awards, "Grievance" received a nomination for Best Hard Rock Performance. Regarding Binaural, Ament stated that "we look back and think we didn't put some of the best songs on it", adding that "I think there are some beautiful things that came out of it, but we're never going to remember that record as one of the greats."

== Tour ==
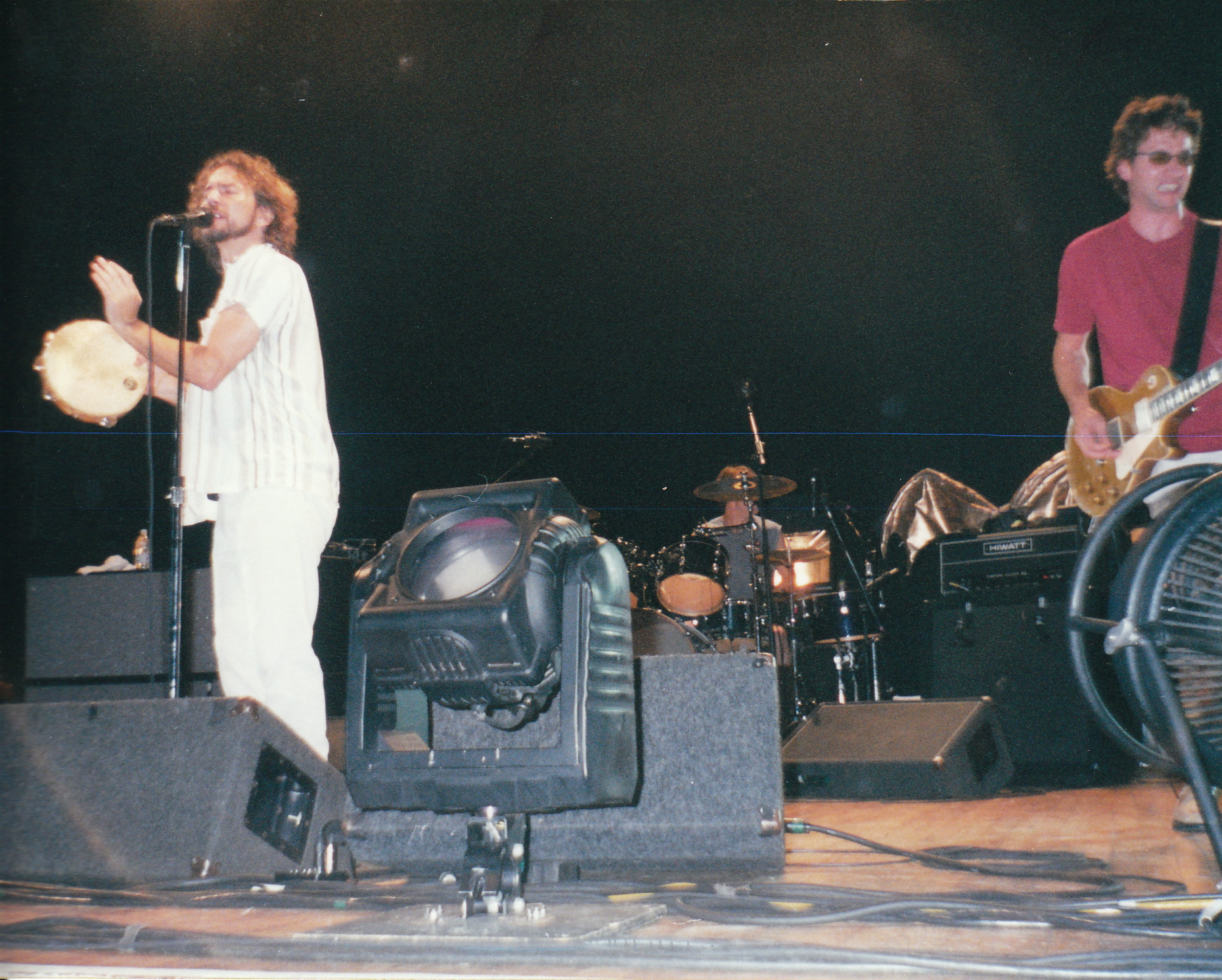
Pearl Jam in Columbia, Maryland on September 4, 2000.

Pearl Jam promoted the album with tours in Europe and North America. The tour started along with the album release on May 23, with a show in Lisbon, Portugal. The European tour had 26 dates. The final concert of the European tour ended in tragedy, where an accident at the Roskilde Festival in Denmark on June 30 led nine fans to be crushed underfoot and suffocated to death as the crowd rushed to the front. This led two additional concerts through July to be cancelled. A month after the European tour concluded, the band embarked on a two-leg North American tour, starting on Virginia Beach, Virginia on August 3. The first leg of the tour focused on the East Coast of the United States, and then the band moved to the Midwest and the West Coast for the tour's second leg. The band considered disbanding after the Roskilde tragedy, but Vedder stated that "playing, facing crowds, being together" in the North American tour "enabled us to start processing it."

On October 22, 2000, the band played the MGM Grand Garden Arena in Las Vegas, Nevada, celebrating the 10th anniversary of its first live performance as a band. The tour's final night took place on November 6, 2000, in Seattle, Washington at KeyArena where the band performed for more than three hours. The European and North American tours were documented by a long series of official bootlegs, all of which were available in record stores as well as through the band's fan club. The band released 72 live albums in 2000 and 2001, and set a record for most albums to debut in the Billboard 200 at the same time. Following the conclusion of the 2000 tour, the band released Touring Band 2000, a DVD which featured select performances from the North American legs of the tour.

Binaural was played in its entirety at the May 10, 2016 show in Toronto at the Air Canada Centre, as a block and in sequence, during the first set of a longer performance.

== Track listing ==
All lyrics are written by Eddie Vedder, except where noted.

Binaural track listing
No.	Title	Lyrics	Music	Length
1.	"Breakerfall"		Vedder	2:19
2.	"Gods' Dice"	Jeff Ament	Ament	2:26
3.	"Evacuation"		Matt Cameron	2:56
4.	"Light Years"		Vedder, Mike McCready, Stone Gossard	5:06
5.	"Nothing as It Seems^{[*]}"	Ament	Ament	5:22
6.	"Thin Air"	Gossard	Gossard	3:32
7.	"Insignificance"		Vedder	4:28
8.	"Of the Girl^{[*]}"	Gossard	Gossard	5:07
9.	"Grievance"		Vedder	3:14
10.	"Rival^{[*]}"	Gossard	Gossard	3:38
11.	"Sleight of Hand^{[*]}"		Ament	4:47
12.	"Soon Forget^{[*]}"		Vedder	1:46
13.	"Parting Ways^{[I]}"		Vedder	7:17
Total length:				52:05

I "Parting Ways" contains the hidden track "Writer's Block" at 6:49.

* Asterisks denote the use of binaural recording techniques.

Japanese bonus disc
No.	Title	Music	Length
1.	"Footsteps^{[*]}" (live)	Gossard	5:24
2.	"Better Man^{[*]}" (live)	Vedder	4:37
Total length:			10:01

* Live tracks recorded at the 1999 Bridge School Benefit.

=== Original track listing ===
When the track listing for Binaural was first released in late March 2000, it was quite different from the final version. Some tracks that were originally on the album were dropped and not released until the 2003 rarities compilation, Lost Dogs, and "Gods' Dice" was added to the final version. The original version is as follows:

1. "Breakerfall"
2. "Insignificance"
3. "Evacuation"
4. "Letter to the Dead"
  - Later renamed to "Sad"
5. "Rival"
6. "Grievance"
7. "Light Years"
8. "Of the Girl"
9. "Thin Air"
10. "Nothing as It Seems"
11. "Fatal"
12. "Sleight of Hand"
13. "Soon Forget"
14. "In the Moonlight"
15. "Parting Ways"
16. "Education"

== Personnel ==
Personnel taken from Binaural liner notes, except where noted.

Pearl Jam

- Eddie Vedder – vocals, guitar, ukulele on "Soon Forget"; credited as "Jerome Turner" for album concept
- Stone Gossard – guitar
- Jeff Ament – bass guitar, inside photography
- Mike McCready – guitar
- Matt Cameron – drums

Additional musicians

- April Cameron – viola
- Justine Foy – cello
- Mitchell Froom – keyboards, harmonium
- Wendy Melvoin – percussion
- Pete Thomas – percussion
- Dakota – canine vocal

Production

- Matt Bayles – engineering
- Tchad Blake – production, mixing (tracks 5, 6, 9, 11–13), portraits
- Liz Burns – assistance with NASA photos
- K.P. Handron, R. O'Dell, NASA – inside cover
- J. Hester, P. Scowen, NASA – booklet cover
- Brendan O'Brien – mixing (tracks 1–4, 7, 8, 10)
- Pearl Jam – production
- R. Sahai, J. Trauger, WFPC2 science team, NASA – front cover
- Adam Samuels, Ashley Stubbert – second engineers

== Charts and certifications ==
=== Weekly charts ===
Weekly chart performance for Binaural
Chart (2000)	Peak position
Australian Albums (ARIA)	1
Austrian Albums (Ö3 Austria)	8
Belgian Albums (Ultratop Flanders)	5
Belgian Albums (Ultratop Wallonia)	34
Canadian Albums (Billboard)	2
Danish Albums (Hitlisten)	20
Dutch Albums (Album Top 100)	5
Finnish Albums (Suomen virallinen lista)	10
French Albums (SNEP)	12
German Albums (Offizielle Top 100)	4
Hungarian Albums (MAHASZ)	21
Irish Albums (IRMA)	6
Italian Albums (FIMI)	2
Japanese Albums (Oricon)	18
New Zealand Albums (RMNZ)	1
Norwegian Albums (VG-lista)	2
Scottish Albums (OCC)	5
Spanish Albums (AFYVE)	11
Swedish Albums (Sverigetopplistan)	6
Swiss Albums (Schweizer Hitparade)	8
UK Albums (OCC)	5
UK Rock & Metal Albums (OCC)	1
US Billboard 200	2

=== Year-end charts ===
Year-end chart performance for Binaural
Chart (2000)	Position
Australian Albums (ARIA)	36
Belgian Albums (Ultratop Flanders)	95
Canadian Albums (Nielsen SoundScan)	88
German Albums (Offizielle Top 100)	99
US Billboard 200	152

=== Certifications ===
Certifications for Binaural
Region	Certification	Certified units/sales
Australia (ARIA)	Platinum	70,000^{^}
Canada (Music Canada)	Gold	50,000^{^}
New Zealand (RMNZ)	Gold	7,500^{^}
United Kingdom (BPI)	Silver	60,000^{^}
United States (RIAA)	Gold	500,000^{^}
^{^} Shipments figures based on certification alone.
