= Go (Pearl Jam song) =

1993 single by Pearl Jam

Single by Pearl Jam

from the album Vs.
- B-side: "Elderly Woman Behind the Counter in a Small Town" (acoustic), "Alone"
- Released: October 11, 1993
- Length: 3:12
- Label: Epic
- Composers: Dave Abbruzzese; Jeff Ament; Stone Gossard; Mike McCready; Eddie Vedder
- Lyricist: Eddie Vedder
- Producers: Brendan O'Brien; Pearl Jam

Pearl Jam singles chronology
"Oceans" (1992)	"Go" (1993)	"Daughter" (1993)

Audio sample
- file; help

"Go" is a song by American rock band Pearl Jam, released in October 1993 as the first single from the band's second studio album, Vs. (1993). Although credited to all members of Pearl Jam, it features lyrics written by vocalist Eddie Vedder and music primarily written by drummer Dave Abbruzzese. The song peaked at number three on the US Billboard Album Rock Tracks chart and reached the top five in New Zealand and Norway. "Go" received a Grammy nomination for Best Hard Rock Performance at the 1995 Grammy Awards. The song was included on Pearl Jam's 2004 greatest hits album, rearviewmirror (Greatest Hits 1991–2003).

== Origin and recording ==
"Go" was one of the songs the band produced during the first week of recording for Vs. The main guitar riff for "Go" was written by drummer Dave Abbruzzese. He initially wrote the music for the song using an acoustic guitar. Abbruzzese said, "With "Go", I just happened to pick up the guitar at the right moment. Stone asked what I was playing and started playing it, then Jeff started playing it, and Eddie started singing with it, and it turned into a song."

Guitarist Stone Gossard added the siren-like guitar part. Gossard on the song:

That song went through a cool evolution that goes back to what we've been saying about creative input. Dave played us the two main parts, that BAM-BAM-BAM groovy chordal riff bit and then the main ascending riff in more of an acoustic vein. Then, when he got behind the drums, everyone turned up real loud and it evolved into something else, a little more hard core.

Guitarist Mike McCready played a yellow Telecaster on the song. McCready threw the guitar on the ground at the end of the take, which can be heard on the recorded version. McCready on the song:

That solo on "Go" was probably the second of three or four takes. And I do have a problem recreating it live, because I wasn't thinking about it at all when we did it in the studio. So on stage, I get into this mode where I'll start to think while I'm playing, "Okay, this sounds like the album, and I want to emulate that." But to really capture that feel of being in the moment, I have to be in contact with the emotion that's running through me RIGHT NOW.

== Lyrics ==
In Kim Neely's book Five Against One: The Pearl Jam Story, Abbruzzese quips that vocalist Eddie Vedder told him he wrote the lyrics for "Go" about his pickup truck.

== Release and reception ==
While the "Go" single was released commercially to international markets in 1993, the commercial single was not released in the United States until June 27, 1995, and was only available as a more expensive import version beforehand. "Go" was released as a single in 1993 with a previously unreleased B-side titled "Alone", of which an alternate version can also be found on the compilation album, Lost Dogs (2003). The song peaked at number three on the Billboard Album Rock Tracks chart and number eight on the Billboard Modern Rock Tracks chart. At the 1995 Grammy Awards, "Go" received a nomination for Best Hard Rock Performance.

Outside the United States, the single was released commercially in Australia, Europe, and the United Kingdom. The UK release of this single included a bonus cassette featuring a live version of the Vs. track "Animal", which was distributed free with all the vinyl "Go" singles. This made the song ineligible to reach the UK top 100, and it stalled at number 190. However, on the UK Network Chart compiled by the Media Research Information Bureau (MRIB), it reached at number 10. "Go" peaked at number 22 on the Australian ARIA Singles Chart, number 21 in the Netherlands, and number five in Norway. In New Zealand, the single reached number two to become Pearl Jam's highest-charting song in that country, along with 1994's "Spin the Black Circle".

Chris True of AllMusic said that "Go" "can at times feel like a jam, but a jam that has stripped all the useless meanderings and solos in favor of sheer pace." He added, "For them to open up their second album, Vs. with this rather aggressive song...was an obvious statement by Pearl Jam that they were no longer the band of "Jeremy" fame. This was a band intent on writing its own rule book, taking over their way."

== Live performances ==
"Go" was first performed live at the band's May 13, 1993, concert in San Francisco, California at Slim's Café. On April 3, 1994, in Atlanta, Georgia at the Fox Theatre, Vedder dedicated a live version of the song to Kurt Cobain, days after the Nirvana frontman had escaped from rehab. Cobain's body would be found five days later, on April 8; he is believed to have died on April 5. Live performances of "Go" can be found on the "Dissident"/Live in Atlanta box set, the live album Live on Two Legs, various official bootlegs, and the Live at the Gorge 05/06 box set. A performance of the song is also included on the DVD Touring Band 2000. When played live, the percussive intro at the beginning of the song is omitted, with the band launching straight into the main chord progression.

== Track listings ==
All songs were written by Dave Abbruzzese, Jeff Ament, Stone Gossard, Mike McCready, and Eddie Vedder.

CD (US, Australia, Austria, Canada, and Europe) and Cassette (Australia, Indonesia, and Thailand)

1. "Go" – 3:13
2. "Elderly Woman Behind the Counter in a Small Town" (acoustic) – 3:18
3. "Alone" – 3:35

CD (Austria and The Netherlands)

1. "Go" – 3:13
2. "Elderly Woman Behind the Counter in a Small Town" (acoustic) – 3:18

CD (UK) and 12-inch vinyl (UK)

1. "Go" – 3:13
2. "Elderly Woman Behind the Counter in a Small Town" (acoustic) – 3:18
3. "Alone" – 3:35
- Included a bonus cassette featuring "Animal" (live) recorded at the MTV Video Music Awards on September 2, 1993.

== Charts ==
Chart (1993–1994)	Peak position
Australia (ARIA)	22
Belgium (Ultratop 50 Flanders)	35
Europe (Eurochart Hot 100)	26
Germany (GfK)	96
Netherlands (Dutch Top 40)	23
Netherlands (Single Top 100)	21
New Zealand (Recorded Music NZ)	2
Norway (VG-lista)	5
UK Singles (MRIB)	10
US Alternative Airplay (Billboard)	8
US Mainstream Rock (Billboard)	3

== Release history ==
Region	Date	Format(s)	Label(s)	Ref.
Australia	October 11, 1993	CD; cassette	Epic	
United Kingdom	October 25, 1993	12-inch vinyl; CD	Epic	
United States	June 27, 1995	CD	Epic	
