= Off He Goes =

Single by Pearl Jam

from the album No Code
- B-side: "Dead Man"
- Released: January 11, 1997
- Recorded: September 1995 at Kingsway Studio, New Orleans, Louisiana
- Genre: Alternative rock; folk rock
- Length: 6:02
- Label: Epic
- Songwriter(s): Eddie Vedder
- Producer(s): Brendan O'Brien, Pearl Jam

Pearl Jam singles chronology
"Hail, Hail" (1996)	"Off He Goes" (1997)	"Given to Fly" (1998)

"Off He Goes" is a song by the American rock band Pearl Jam. Written by vocalist Eddie Vedder, "Off He Goes" was released in January 1997 as the third single from the band's fourth studio album, No Code (1996). The song peaked at number 31 on the Billboard Alternative Songs chart. The song was included on Pearl Jam's 2004 greatest hits album, rearviewmirror (Greatest Hits 1991–2003).

== Origin and recording ==
"Off He Goes" was written by vocalist Eddie Vedder.

== Lyrics ==
The story of "Off He Goes" concerns a friend who periodically comes whirling in and out of the protagonist's life. In an interview, Vedder revealed himself to be the friend. Vedder said, "The song 'Off He Goes' is really about me being a shit friend. I'll show up and everything's great and then all of [a] sudden I'm outta there..." During a Pearl Jam performance on June 16, 2000 in Katowice, Poland at Spodek, Vedder said before starting the song that "this is about being friends with an asshole," and pointed at himself.

== Release and reception ==
"Off He Goes" was released as a single in 1996 with a previously unreleased B-side titled "Dead Man", which can also be found on the compilation album, Lost Dogs (2003). The song peaked at number 34 on the Billboard Mainstream Rock Tracks chart and number 31 on the Billboard Modern Rock Tracks chart.

Outside the United States, the single was released commercially in Australia. In Canada, the song reached the top 40 on the Canadian Singles Chart, and later it charted on the Canadian Alternative Top 30 chart where it reached number 15 and stayed there for two weeks. "Off He Goes" would peak at number 46 on the Australian Singles Chart.

In AllMusic's review of No Code, "Off He Goes" was cited as one song on the album that is "equal [to] the group's earlier masterpieces." David Fricke of Rolling Stone said, "At first, "Off He Goes" sounds like another page torn from the Neil Young hymnal. Its elegant, acoustic simplicity is deceiving, though. With a humor and confidence that he rarely gets credit for, Vedder describes a man not unlike himself—at least, his public image—but from the point of view of an old, puzzled friend."

== Live performances ==
"Off He Goes" was first performed live at the band's September 14, 1996 concert in Seattle, Washington at The Showbox. In live performance, the song has been especially effective in an acoustic band setting, such as on July 11, 2003 in Mansfield, Massachusetts at the Tweeter Center Boston. Live performances of "Off He Goes" can be found on the live album Live on Two Legs, various official bootlegs, the live album Live at Benaroya Hall, and the Live at the Gorge 05/06 box set. A performance of the song is also included on the DVD Live at the Showbox.

== Track listing ==
All songs written by Eddie Vedder.

1. "Off He Goes" – 5:59
2. "Dead Man" – 4:15

== Personnel ==
Pearl Jam

- Eddie Vedder – vocals, guitar
- Jeff Ament – bass guitar
- Stone Gossard – guitar, vocals
- Mike McCready – guitar
- Jack Irons – drums

Additional personnel

- Brendan O'Brien – piano

== Charts ==
Chart (1997)	Peak position
Australian Singles Chart	46
Canadian RPM Singles Chart	36
Canadian RPM Alternative 30	15
US Alternative Airplay (Billboard)	31
US Mainstream Rock (Billboard)	34
