= Immortality (Pearl Jam song) =

1995 single by Pearl Jam

Single by Pearl Jam

from the album Vitalogy
- B-side: "Rearviewmirror" (performed by the Frogs)
- Released: June 12, 1995
- Studio: Southern Tracks, Doppler (Atlanta, Georgia); Bad Animals (Seattle, Washington)
- Length: 5:18
- Label: Epic
- Composers: Dave Abbruzzese; Jeff Ament; Stone Gossard; Mike McCready; Eddie Vedder
- Lyricist: Eddie Vedder
- Producers: Brendan O'Brien; Pearl Jam

Pearl Jam singles chronology
"Not for You" (1995)	"Immortality" (1995)	"I Got Id" (1995)

Audio sample
- file; help

"Immortality" is a song by the American rock band Pearl Jam, released on June 12, 1995, as the third single from the band's third studio album, Vitalogy (1994). The song peaked at number 10 on the US Billboard Album Rock Tracks chart. The song was included on Pearl Jam's 2004 greatest hits album, rearviewmirror (Greatest Hits 1991–2003).

== Lyrics ==
The lyrical interpretation of "Immortality" can be disputed, as many feel it may be about Nirvana frontman Kurt Cobain's death, although vocalist Eddie Vedder has denied this. He stated:

No, that was written when we were on tour in Atlanta. It's not about Kurt. Nothing on the album was written directly about Kurt, and I don't feel like talking about him, because it [might be seen] as exploitation. But I think there might be some things in the lyrics that you could read into and maybe will answer some questions or help you understand the pressures on someone who is on a parallel train...

In a later interview, Vedder talked about how he thought of Cobain and himself as "parallel trains." He said, "You look at it objectively and you think, 'What could be so fucking hard about being in a band?' But if you're coming from a place that's real, it's much harder."

== Release and reception ==
"Immortality" was released in Australia on June 12, 1995, as a CD and cassette single. In the United States, it was serviced to alternative radio on June 19 and to contemporary hit radio the following day. The song peaked at number 10 on the Billboard Album Rock Tracks chart and number 31 on the Billboard Modern Rock Tracks chart. In Canada, the song reached number 62 on the Canadian RPM 100 Hit Tracks chart and later charted on the RPM Alternative Top 30 chart, where it reached number 10. "Immortality" also reached the top 30 in New Zealand.

AllMusic's review of the "Immortality" single stated that "Immortality" is "the best ballad from the otherwise spotty Vitalogy." Jon Pareles of The New York Times called it a "sullen Neil Young-style march" in which Eddie Vedder "ruminates over suicide as an end to pain." David Browne of Entertainment Weekly said that "the sulking, lashing "Immortality" appears to be a Big Statement song about death, yet you'd never know that from its obtuse lyrics."

== Live performances ==
"Immortality" was first performed live at the band's April 11, 1994, concert in Boston, Massachusetts at the Boston Garden. The lyrics that appeared in the first live version of the song were altered before release. Live performances of "Immortality" can be found on various official bootlegs and the live album Live at Benaroya Hall.

The alternate version played in Boston in 1994 featured first-person lyrics, as opposed to the third person lyrics on the studio take, ending in what could be thought of as a reference to the Neil Young song, Hey Hey My My, where Vedder sang the lyrics "Hey hey, this is my last day... my my, know how hard I try/Hey hey, I wouldn't love to stay, my my, I wish I could get high". For years, this version was only available through bootlegs, but a large portion of an April 12, 1994, concert from the Orpheum in Boston, including Immortality, was included on a bonus disc of the Vs./Vitalogy re-issue.

== Track listing ==
All songs were written by Dave Abbruzzese, Jeff Ament, Stone Gossard, Mike McCready, and Eddie Vedder.

1. "Immortality" – 5:18
2. "Rearviewmirror" (performed by the Frogs) – 5:18

== Charts ==
Chart (1995)	Peak position
Australia (ARIA)	51
Canada Top Singles (RPM)	62
Canada Rock/Alternative (RPM)	10
New Zealand (Recorded Music NZ)	29
US Alternative Airplay (Billboard)	31
US Mainstream Rock Airplay (Billboard)	10
