= Dissident (song) =

1994 single by Pearl Jam

Single by Pearl Jam

from the album Vs.
- B-side: "Rearviewmirror" (live)
- Released: May 16, 1994
- Genre: Grunge
- Length: 3:35
- Label: Epic
- Composers: Dave Abbruzzese; Jeff Ament; Stone Gossard; Mike McCready; Eddie Vedder
- Lyricist: Eddie Vedder
- Producers: Brendan O'Brien; Pearl Jam

Pearl Jam singles chronology
"Animal" (1994)	"Dissident" (1994)	"Spin the Black Circle" (1994)

Audio
- "Dissident" on YouTube

"Dissident" is a song by American rock band Pearl Jam, appearing as the fifth track on their second studio album, Vs. (1993). It was written by band members Eddie Vedder, Jeff Ament, Stone Gossard, Mike McCready, and Dave Abbruzzese. According to Vedder, "Dissident" is about a woman who secretly shelters a refugee but eventually turns him in to the authorities because she cannot support him any longer, leading her to feel guilty about her decision.

"Dissident" was released as the fourth single from Vs. on May 16, 1994. It peaked at number three on the US Billboard Album Rock Tracks chart and was the album's highest-charting single in the United Kingdom, reaching number 14 on the UK Singles Chart. In mainland Europe, three CD singles containing the band's April 1994 concert at the Fox Theatre in Atlanta, Georgia, were released in association with "Dissident". Discs two and three of the set entered the top five in Denmark and Norway.

The song was included on Pearl Jam's 2004 greatest hits album, rearviewmirror (Greatest Hits 1991–2003).

== Lyrical content ==
Pearl Jam lead vocalist Eddie Vedder said about the song "Dissident":

In "Dissident," I'm actually talking about a woman who takes in someone who's being sought after by the authorities for political reasons. He's on the run, and she offers him a refuge. But she just can't handle the responsibility. She turns him in, then she has to live with the guilt and the realization that she's betrayed the one thing that gave her life meaning. It made her life difficult. It made her life hell. But it gave her a reason to be. But she couldn't hold on. She folded. That's the tragedy of the song.

At Pearl Jam's March 17, 1994, concert in West Lafayette, Indiana at Purdue University's Elliot Hall, Vedder said that the "holy no" in the song refers to date rape, explaining that "a woman's word is sacred and the no means no and that's what a 'holy no' is."

== Release and reception ==
While the "Dissident" single was released commercially to international markets on May 16, 1994, the commercial single was not released in the United States until June 27, 1995, and was only available as a more expensive import version beforehand. "Dissident" peaked at number three on the Billboard Album Rock Tracks chart. Outside the United States, the song peaked at number 97 in Germany, reached the top 30 in France, and was a top-10 success in Denmark, Finland, Ireland, and Norway. It was additionally a top-20 success in the Netherlands and the United Kingdom. Part two of "Dissident" reached number two in the Netherlands and the top 20 in France; in the former country, it was the fourth highest-selling single of the year according to the Single Top 100 listing.

== Live performances ==
"Dissident" was first performed live at the band's May 13, 1993, concert in San Francisco, California at Slim's Café. Live performances of "Dissident" can be found on the "Dissident" single, various official bootlegs, and the Live at the Gorge 05/06 box set. A performance of the song is also included on the DVD Touring Band 2000.

== Track listings ==
All songs were written by Dave Abbruzzese, Jeff Ament, Stone Gossard, Mike McCready, and Eddie Vedder, except where noted. All live track were recorded on April 3, 1994, at the Fox Theatre in Atlanta, Georgia.

UK CD1

1. "Dissident" – 3:32
2. "Release" (live) (Ament, Gossard, Dave Krusen, McCready, Vedder) / "Rearviewmirror" (live) / "Even Flow" (live) (Vedder, Gossard) – 15:22

UK CD2, "Dissident (Part 2)"

1. "Dissident" – 3:32
2. "Dissident" (live) / "Why Go" (live) (Vedder, Ament) / "Deep" (live) (Vedder, Gossard, Ament) – 11:52

European CD single

1. "Dissident" – 3:35
2. "Release" (live) (Ament, Gossard, Krusen, McCready, Vedder)

European 7-inch single

A. "Dissident" – 3:32
B. "Rearviewmirror" (live) – 5:08

=== "Dissident"/Live in Atlanta ===
In Europe, three CD singles were released to compile the band's concert at the Fox Theatre, with the only omissions being three songs from the yet-to-be-released Vitalogy ("Whipping", "Better Man", and "Satan's Bed") and the Dead Boys cover "Sonic Reducer". All three singles were available as a box set entitled Live in Atlanta. Discs two and three became commercial hits in Denmark and Norway, where they peaked within the top five in both countries.

Disc one

1. "Dissident" – 3:51
2. "Release" (live) – 4:55
3. "Rearviewmirror" (live) – 5:31
4. "Even Flow" (live) – 5:05
5. "Dissident" (live) – 3:25
6. "Why Go" (live) – 3:50
7. "Deep" (live) – 4:42

Disc two

1. "Jeremy" (live) – 3:00
2. "Glorified G" (live) – 3:19
3. "Daughter" (live) – 5:07
4. "Go" (live) – 2:57
5. "Animal" (live) – 2:48
6. "Garden" (live) – 6:52
7. "State of Love and Trust" (live) – 3:58
8. "Black" (live) – 5:45

Disc three

1. "Alive" (live) – 5:08
2. "Blood" (live) – 3:39
3. "W.M.A." (live) – 6:24
4. "Elderly Woman Behind the Counter in a Small Town" (live) – 3:43
5. "Rats" (live) – 4:37
6. "Once" (live) – 3:21
7. "Porch" (live) – 11:01
8. "Indifference" (live) – 5:00

== Charts ==
=== Weekly charts ===
"Dissident"

Chart (1994)	Peak position
Belgium (Ultratop 50 Flanders)	41
Denmark (IFPI)	3
Europe (Eurochart Hot 100)	17
Finland (Suomen virallinen lista)	7
France (SNEP)	24
Germany (GfK)	97
Ireland (IRMA)	7
Netherlands (Dutch Top 40)	16
Netherlands (Single Top 100)	14
Norway (VG-lista)	2
Scottish Singles Sales (Official Charts)	20
UK Singles (Official Charts)	14
US Mainstream Rock (Billboard)	3

"Dissident (Part 2)"

Chart (1994)	Peak position
France (SNEP)	19
Netherlands (Dutch Top 40)	9
Netherlands (Single Top 100)	2

Live in Atlanta 2

Chart (1994)	Peak position
Denmark (IFPI)	3
Europe (Eurochart Hot 100)	19
Norway (VG-lista)	2

Live in Atlanta 3

Chart (1994)	Peak position
Denmark (IFPI)	3
Europe (Eurochart Hot 100)	26
Norway (VG-lista)	4

=== Year-end charts ===
"Dissident"

Chart (1994)	Position
US Album Rock Tracks (Billboard)	25

"Dissident (Part 2)"

Chart (1994)	Position
Netherlands (Single Top 100)	4
