= Elderly Woman Behind the Counter in a Small Town =

Pearl Jam song

- Artwork for the Spanish promotional release of the 1998 Live on Two Legs version

Song by Pearl Jam

from the album Vs.
- Released: October 19, 1993
- Recorded: March–May 1993 at The Site, Nicasio, California
- Genre: Acoustic rock
- Length: 3:15
- Label: Epic
- Composers: Dave Abbruzzese; Jeff Ament; Stone Gossard; Mike McCready; Eddie Vedder
- Lyricist: Eddie Vedder
- Producers: Brendan O'Brien, Pearl Jam

"Elderly Woman Behind the Counter in a Small Town" is a song by the American rock band Pearl Jam. The song is the tenth track on the band's second studio album, Vs. (1993). Although credited to all members of Pearl Jam, it was primarily written by vocalist Eddie Vedder. The length of the song's title was a reaction by the band to the fact that most of its songs featured one-word titles. The song is often referred to simply as "Elderly Woman" or "Small Town" by the band and its fans. Despite the lack of a commercial single release, the song reached number 17 on the Billboard Modern Rock Tracks chart. An acoustic version of the song can be found on the "Go" single. The song was included on Pearl Jam's 2004 greatest hits album, rearviewmirror (Greatest Hits 1991–2003).

== Origin and recording ==
When discussing how he initially came up with "Elderly Woman Behind the Counter in a Small Town", vocalist Eddie Vedder stated that "it was so quick". He elaborated further:

We were recording the second record, and we stayed in this house in San Francisco, and I was outside the house in my own world and the little outhouse had a small room. I'm talking the size of a bathroom. I was able to fit a Shure Vocal Master, which is a 1960s PA, and two big towers of PA and a little amp and a 4 track. I slept in there too. I remember waking up one morning and playing pretty normal chords that sounded good, and I put on the vocal master to hear myself and it came out right quick. I don't even think I scribbled the lyrics down. It took 20 minutes. Stone was sitting outside reading the paper, and he was like "I really like that." So we recorded it that day.

== Lyrics ==
Vedder about "Elderly Woman Behind the Counter in a Small Town":

It's kind of about a lady, and she's getting on in years, and she's stuck in this small town. Small towns fascinate me: You either struggle like hell to get out, to some people want to stay 'cause then they're the big fish in the small pond, and then others just kind of get stuck there. So here she is working in this little place, and then an old flame comes in, and he's probably driving a nice car and looking kind of sharp—not a fancy car, but he's moved on. And then she sees him, and at first she doesn't even remember who he is, and then she realizes who it is. She's just too embarrassed to say "hello".

== Reception ==
Without being released as a single, "Elderly Woman Behind the Counter in a Small Town" peaked at number 23 on the Billboard Mainstream Rock Tracks chart and number 17 on the Billboard Modern Rock Tracks chart in 1994. David Browne of Entertainment Weekly said the song has "an unexpected melodic delicacy".

The lyric page for the song in the album's liner notes featured a picture of an "elderly woman", but at some point after the first pressings another picture was used in place of the original. Allegedly, the original woman never gave permission for her picture to be used, so Pearl Jam changed the picture to another woman. The difference is easy to spot, as "the new and improved woman behind the counter" is printed below the picture.

== Live performances ==
"Elderly Woman Behind the Counter in a Small Town" was first performed live at the band's June 16, 1993 concert in Missoula, Montana, at the University of Montana-Missoula's University Theatre.

Live performances of the song can be found on the "Dissident"/Live in Atlanta box set, the live album Live on Two Legs, various official bootlegs, the Live at the Gorge 05/06 box set, and the live album Live at Lollapalooza 2007. A performance of the song is also included on the DVD Live at the Showbox. The live version from Live on Two Legs reached number 21 on the Billboard Mainstream Rock Tracks chart and number 26 on the Billboard Modern Rock Tracks chart in 1998. In Canada, this version reached the top 30 on the Canadian Singles Chart.

== Chart positions ==
Vs. version

Chart (1994)	Position
US Modern Rock Tracks	17
US Mainstream Rock Tracks	23

Live on Two Legs version

Chart (1998)	Position
US Mainstream Rock Tracks	21
US Modern Rock Tracks	26
Canadian RPM Singles Chart	27

== Certifications ==
Certifications for "Elderly Woman Behind the Counter in a Small Town"
Region	Certification	Certified units/sales
Canada (Music Canada)	Platinum	80,000^{‡}
New Zealand (RMNZ)	Platinum	30,000^{‡}
United States (RIAA)	Gold	500,000^{‡}
^{‡} Sales+streaming figures based on certification alone.

== Cover versions ==
A version of "Elderly Woman Behind the Counter in a Small Town" by Charlotte Martin can be found on her 2007 album Reproductions. Young@Heart Chorus, whose singers range from ages 73 to 90, covered "Elderly Woman Behind the Counter of a Small Town" at their 4th Annual Mash-Up concert in November 2016.

The Anchoress covered "Elderly Woman Behind the Counter in a Small Town" on her 2022 release Versions / EP 2.

== Usage in media ==
The song was used in promos for the final season of Rescue Me.

In Family Guy, season 20 episode 19, "First Blood", the song was used in a cutaway where Glenn Quagmire grows old.
