= Hail, Hail =

1996 single by Pearl Jam

Single by Pearl Jam

from the album No Code
- B-side: "Black, Red, Yellow"
- Released: October 21, 1996
- Recorded: July 12, 1995 – May 1996
- Genre: Punk rock
- Length: 3:41
- Label: Epic
- Songwriters: Stone Gossard, Eddie Vedder, Jeff Ament, Mike McCready
- Producers: Brendan O'Brien, Pearl Jam

Pearl Jam singles chronology
"Who You Are" (1996)	"Hail, Hail" (1996)	"Off He Goes" (1997)

Audio sample
- file; help

"Hail, Hail" is a song by the American rock band Pearl Jam. Featuring lyrics written by vocalist Eddie Vedder and music co-written by guitarist Stone Gossard, bassist Jeff Ament, and guitarist Mike McCready. "Hail, Hail" was released in October 1996 as the second single from the band's fourth studio album, No Code (1996). The song managed to reach the number nine spot on both the Mainstream Rock and Modern Rock Billboard charts. The song was included on Pearl Jam's 2004 greatest hits album, rearviewmirror (Greatest Hits 1991–2003).

== Origin and recording ==
"Hail, Hail" features lyrics written by vocalist Eddie Vedder and music co-written by guitarist Stone Gossard, bassist Jeff Ament, and guitarist Mike McCready. Gossard stated, "People say that No Code wasn't like a rock record. The big comment you'd hear over and over again was 'experimental record.' But then you hear 'Habit' and 'Hail, Hail' and 'Lukin', and those songs are totally rock."

== Lyrics ==
The lyrics of "Hail, Hail" refer to two people in a troubled relationship struggling to hold it together.

== Release and reception ==
The commercially released single for "Hail, Hail" was exclusive to Australia, Canada, Japan, and Europe. The song was released as a single in 1996 with a previously unreleased B-side titled "Black, Red, Yellow", of which an alternate version can also be found on the compilation album, Lost Dogs (2003). "Black, Red, Yellow" is an homage to basketball player Dennis Rodman, who has a cameo in the track.

The song peaked at number nine on the Billboard Mainstream Rock Tracks and Billboard Modern Rock Tracks charts. It appeared on Billboard magazine's Hot 100 Airplay chart, reaching the top 70. In Canada, "Hail, Hail" charted on the Alternative Top 30 chart where it peaked at number two. "Hail, Hail" also reached number 24 on the Canadian Year End Alternative Top 50. "Hail, Hail" would peak at number 31 on the Australian Singles Chart.

David Fricke of Rolling Stone said, "Vedder queries with rubbed-raw enunciation in "Hail, Hail", measuring the strength and resilience of good, honest affection against the staccato punch of Gossard's and Mike McCready's guitars and Irons' urgent, emphatic drumming." Ryan Schreiber of Pitchfork Media called "Hail, Hail" the "thrashing, typical Pearl Jam song."

== Live performances ==
"Hail, Hail" was first performed live at the band's September 14, 1996 concert in Seattle, Washington at The Showbox. The band played this song when it appeared on the Late Show with David Letterman in September 1996 in support of No Code. Live performances of "Hail, Hail" can be found on the live album Live on Two Legs, various official bootlegs, and the Live at the Gorge 05/06 box set.

== Track listing ==
1. "Hail, Hail" (Stone Gossard, Eddie Vedder, Jeff Ament, Mike McCready) – 3:44
2. "Black, Red, Yellow" (Vedder) – 2:59

== Personnel ==
- Eddie Vedder – vocals, guitar
- Jeff Ament – bass guitar
- Stone Gossard – guitar, vocals
- Mike McCready – guitar
- Jack Irons – drums

== Charts ==
Chart (1996)	Peak position
Australia (ARIA Charts)	31
Canada Alternative 30 (RPM)	2
Netherlands (Dutch Single Tip)	13
US Billboard Hot 100 Airplay	69
US Alternative Airplay (Billboard)	9
US Mainstream Rock Airplay (Billboard)	9
