= Light Years (Pearl Jam song) =

2000 single by Pearl Jam

Single by Pearl Jam

from the album Binaural
- B-side: "Grievance" (live), "Soon Forget" (live)
- Released: July 10, 2000
- Studio: Studio Litho (Seattle, Washington)
- Length: 5:06
- Label: Epic
- Composers: Stone Gossard, Mike McCready, Eddie Vedder
- Lyricist: Eddie Vedder
- Producers: Tchad Blake, Pearl Jam

Pearl Jam singles chronology
"Nothing as It Seems" (2000)	"Light Years" (2000)	"I Am Mine" (2002)

Audio sample
- file; help

"Light Years" is a song by American rock band Pearl Jam. Featuring lyrics written by vocalist Eddie Vedder and music co-written by Vedder and guitarists Mike McCready and Stone Gossard, "Light Years" was released on July 10, 2000, as the second and final single from the band's sixth studio album, Binaural (2000). The song peaked at number 17 on the Billboard Mainstream Rock Tracks chart. The song was included on Pearl Jam's 2004 greatest hits album, rearviewmirror (Greatest Hits 1991–2003).

== Origin and recording ==
"Light Years" features lyrics written by vocalist Eddie Vedder and music co-written by Vedder and guitarists Mike McCready and Stone Gossard. The song was re-worked from its original demo version titled "Puzzles & Games", as the band felt the original version was too similar to the song "Given to Fly". Vedder on the song:

With "Light Years", Mike McCready had written some music. We were excited about it for a while, but when we got down to recording it, it was too nice, too right there—it was a little too close to "Given to Fly". We changed the tempos, and then one night Mike and I, after working on it all day and getting frustrated, just flipped it backwards, and in about 35 minutes it became "Light Years", with words and everything. It still has a fairly contagious chorus and melody, but it's just sideways enough to make me happy.

McCready on the song:

It was originally kind of a different vibe to that song and it kind of sounded like a song I had written before so me and Eddie kind of sat down and jammed on it one day and just two guitars and out of playing for about an hour it turned into what it is now. And it's kind of a cool, I think, melodic song and lyrically it's pretty beautiful and I have my interpretation about what the song is about and I think everybody should get what they want to get out of it.

Bassist Jeff Ament on the song:

It sounded nothing like what it sounds like now. Mike had a couple of riffs, and Ed really sat down and tried to write to it. He initially had some problems, and one day he came in on his own and had some lyrics that were really heartfelt. He ended up completely rearranging the song. It got played a million different tempos and a million different angles on the drums. That was a hard song; probably more so on Matt's end just because it took so long.

== Lyrics ==
At the Pinkpop Festival in 2000, Vedder dedicated "Light Years" to Diane Muus from Sony Music, a friend of the band who died at the age of 33 in 1997. He said there are "times you have got friends that don't fuck up at all and are great people. And then you just lose them for some reason. They are off the planet and you never had a chance to say goodbye. I only mention this because there was a person we used to know here and that was Diane and ah, we never got a chance to say goodbye. This is goodbye. And if you've got good friends, love them while they're here."

== Release and reception ==
"Light Years" peaked at number 17 on the Billboard Mainstream Rock Tracks chart and number 26 on the Billboard Modern Rock Tracks chart. Outside the United States, the single was released commercially in Australia, Austria, South Africa, and the United Kingdom. In Canada, "Light Years" charted on the Rock Top 30 chart where it peaked at number 21 and stayed there for three weeks. "Light Years" reached the top 60 in the UK and the top 30 in Italy.

In Allmusic's review of the "Light Years" single, it was stated that "with [Pearl Jam's] more enduring and darker tones set in place, fans of Pearl Jam receive a raw and sincere taste of the band's new musical and melodic direction, perhaps ignited with the additional presence of newcomer Matt Cameron on drums." NME called the song "painfully beautiful" in its review of Binaural, while Keith Cameron of NME said in his review of the song, "The specifics of what "Light Years" is about—the death of a friend, apparently—get subsumed into the song's plangent distillation of regret, thereby rendering it perversely uplifting, a trick only the most accomplished and sincere bands can execute with anything approaching conviction." Christopher John Farley of Time described the song as "muted but passionate."

== Live performances ==
"Light Years" was first performed live at the band's May 10, 2000, concert in Bellingham, Washington at the Mount Baker Theatre. Live performances of "Light Years" can be found on various official bootlegs.

At the band's Chicago concert on August 20, 2016, Pearl Jam dedicated this song to The Tragically Hip, whose lead singer Gord Downie had publicized his diagnosis with glioblastoma earlier in the year and who were playing the final date of their Man Machine Poem Tour that same night.

== Track listings ==
All songs were written by Eddie Vedder except where noted.

CD (US, Austria, and UK) and 12-inch vinyl (Austria)

1. "Light Years" (Stone Gossard, Mike McCready, Vedder) – 5:07
2. "Grievance" (live) – 3:29
3. "Soon Forget" (live) – 2:06
- All live tracks were recorded on May 10, 2000, at Mount Baker Theatre in Bellingham, Washington.

CD (Enhanced) (Australia)

1. "Light Years" (Gossard, McCready, Vedder) – 5:07
2. "Grievance" (live) – 3:29
3. "Soon Forget" (live) – 2:06
4. "Do the Evolution" (video clip multimedia) (Gossard, Vedder) – 3:54
- All live tracks were recorded on May 10, 2000, at Mount Baker Theatre in Bellingham, Washington.

CD (Austria and South Africa)

1. "Light Years" (Gossard, McCready, Vedder) – 5:08
2. "Grievance" (live) – 3:30
  - Recorded live on May 10, 2000, at Mount Baker Theatre in Bellingham, Washington.

7-inch vinyl (UK)

1. "Light Years" (Gossard, McCready, Vedder) – 5:08
2. "Soon Forget" (live) – 2:06
  - Recorded live on May 10, 2000, at Mount Baker Theatre in Bellingham, Washington.

== Charts ==
=== Weekly charts ===
Chart (2000)	Peak position
Australia (ARIA)	64
Canada Rock/Alternative (RPM)	21
Italy (FIMI)	25
Portugal (AFP)	5
Scottish Singles Sales (Official Charts)	46
UK Singles (Official Charts)	52
US Alternative Airplay (Billboard)	26
US Mainstream Rock (Billboard)	17

=== Year-end charts ===
Chart (2000)	Position
US Mainstream Rock Tracks (Billboard)	93

== Release history ==
Region	Date	Format(s)	Label(s)	Ref.
United States	June 6, 2000	Mainstream rock; active rock; alternative radio	Epic	
United Kingdom	July 10, 2000	7-inch vinyl; CD	Epic	
