= Nothing as It Seems (song) =

Pearl Jam song

Single by Pearl Jam

from the album Binaural
- B-side: "Insignificance" (alternate mix)
- Released: April 25, 2000
- Studio: Litho (Seattle, Washington)
- Genre: Psychedelic rock
- Length: 5:22
- Label: Epic
- Songwriter: Jeff Ament
- Producers: Tchad Blake, Pearl Jam

Pearl Jam singles chronology
"Last Kiss" (1999)	"Nothing as It Seems" (2000)	"Light Years" (2000)

Audio sample
- file; help

"Nothing as It Seems" is a song by the American rock band Pearl Jam. Written by bassist Jeff Ament, "Nothing as It Seems" was released on April 25, 2000, as the first single from the band's sixth studio album, Binaural (2000). The song peaked at number three on the US Billboard Mainstream Rock Tracks chart and topped the Canadian Singles Chart. The song also appears on Pearl Jam's 2004 greatest hits album, rearviewmirror (Greatest Hits 1991–2003).

== Origin and recording ==
"Nothing as It Seems" was written by bassist Jeff Ament. Ament plays upright bass on the song, giving it a very atmospheric feel. Guitarist Mike McCready used a Fender Pedal for the song, which provided the song with its distorted sounds that McCready described as sounding "like a plane going down." The song was recorded using binaural recording techniques, and was produced by Tchad Blake. Ament on the song:

It was just a little ditty on a demo that I kind of played some hand drums on, and had this little song. Actually, I spent quite a bit of time with the lyrics, and I think Stone initially said, 'Let's try that one.' There were little sections of the song [where] I definitely heard Mike doing his thing, so I kinda said, 'Hey, man, you need to write a theme for these little sections.' It's pretty cool to see a little song that I wrote being played by everyone. I mean, I can almost kind of stand back and just watch this great band play a song...and take it to a completely different level. Mike and Ed [Vedder], they have that ability where they can really raise the level of anything that they play.

Jeff Ament's original demo of "Nothing as It Seems" is a track on disc 2 of Pearl Jam's soundtrack to their documentary "Pearl Jam Twenty" directed by Cameron Crowe.

== Lyrics ==
Ament revealed that he wrote "Nothing as It Seems" about his childhood growing up in a rural area of Northern Montana. In one interview, he called it "a dark, heavy tale" and stated, "For me, it's a song about judgment and not always understanding what is going on with another person." In another interview, he elaborated further:

It's a little bit reflecting on where I came from...I grew up in really rural area in Northern Montana, and ["Nothing As It Seems" is] looking back at [that]. I think until two or three years ago, I looked back at my childhood as being a fairly utopian situation where I had the freedom to ride my bike around town when I was five years old, and my parents didn't have to worry about anybody taking me and killing me or whatever. In the last couple of years...there have been some things that have kind of allowed some darker things to come to the surface of my childhood, seeing things that I had kind of selectively forgotten for my own mental health or whatever. I had just seen Affliction and I had just read Nine Below Zero by this guy, Kevin Canty, all very kind of rural things that unearthed a lot of stuff. ["Nothing As It Seems"] is just kind of what came out. I'm just now starting to actually really analyze what I was talking about...because I still don't really have a grip on that.

== Release and reception ==
Regarding the choice of "Nothing as It Seems" as the band's first single from Binaural, vocalist Eddie Vedder explained, "With that one we felt like we...weren't trying to fool people. It actually felt like we were offering them something fairly challenging. We obviously respect the audience." "Nothing as It Seems" was the most successful song from Binaural on the American rock charts. The song peaked at number 49 on the Billboard Hot 100, number three on the Billboard Mainstream Rock Tracks chart, and number ten on the Billboard Modern Rock Tracks chart.

Outside the United States, the single was released commercially in Australia, Austria, Germany, Japan, and the United Kingdom. In Canada, "Nothing as It Seems" charted on the Rock Top 30 chart where it peaked at number two and stayed there for three weeks. "Nothing as It Seems" reached the top 30 in the UK and peaked at number seven on the Australian Singles Chart. "Nothing as It Seems" reached number 98 in Germany, number 83 in Switzerland, the top 50 in New Zealand, the top 40 in the Netherlands and Sweden, the top 30 in Ireland, and was a top ten success in Italy and Norway.

In its review of the song, Billboard said, "Pearl Jam has once again thrown radio a curve with 'Nothing As It Seems'." In addition, it was stated, "This slowly unfolding track is moody and dark, marked by guitars that kick off the cut with acoustic strumming, then eventually explode into white-hot squalls. Along the way, there's a host of strange effects at play, from Eddie Vedder's echo-drenched vocals to Matt Cameron's hollowed tom shots." In his review of the song, David Stubbs of NME said, "Listening again to his gravelly, broodily opaque vocals here, it's hard to remember why anyone ever gave Eddie Vedder house room. This is the sort of 'grunge' sound that tractors get stuck in after three days of rain. "Nothing As It Seems" is, however, thoroughly redeemed by a good old-fashioned, studio-treated, Hendrix-style guitar solo, visceral and distressed, high and mighty." In its review of Binaural, The Guardian called the song "brooding and mysterious" and one of the album's "best moments." The song has been compared to the style of Pink Floyd. Although the song was not a major commercial success, it has been cited as a Pearl Jam fan favorite.

Prior to releasing "Nothing as It Seems" on radio and CD, Pearl Jam made the single available online in Apple's QuickTime format through both the band's official Sony Music site and the website of their fan club the Ten Club, for 14 days, starting on the night of Sunday April 9, or on Monday April 10, 2000, one day before the single's radio-add date.

== Live performances ==
"Nothing as It Seems" was first performed live at Neil Young's 1999 Bridge School Benefit. Live performances of "Nothing As It Seems" can be found on various official bootlegs, the live album Live at Benaroya Hall, and the iTunes exclusive release The Bridge School Collection, Vol. 1. A performance of the song is also included on the DVD Touring Band 2000. The version of the song on The Bridge School Collection, Vol. 1 is an acoustic performance recorded live at the Bridge School Benefit.

== Track listings ==
CD (US, Austria, and Japan) and 7-inch vinyl (UK)

1. "Nothing as It Seems" (single version) (Jeff Ament) – 5:23
2. "Insignificance" (alternate mix) (Eddie Vedder) – 4:30

CD (Austria and Germany)

1. "Nothing as It Seems" (single version) (Ament) – 5:23
2. "Insignificance" (alternate mix) (Vedder) – 4:30
3. "Better Man" (live) (Vedder) – 4:37
4. "Footsteps" (live) (Stone Gossard, Vedder) – 5:23
- Live tracks recorded at the 1999 Bridge School Benefit.

CD (Australia) and 12-inch vinyl (Europe)

1. "Nothing as It Seems" (single version) (Ament) – 5:23
2. "Insignificance" (alternate mix) (Vedder) – 4:30
3. "Footsteps" (live) (Gossard, Vedder) – 5:23
4. "Better Man" (live) (Vedder) – 4:37
- Live tracks recorded at the 1999 Bridge School Benefit.

CD (UK)

1. "Nothing as It Seems" (single version) (Ament) – 5:23
2. "Better Man" (live) (Vedder) – 4:37
3. "Footsteps" (live) (Gossard, Vedder) – 5:23
- Live tracks recorded at the 1999 Bridge School Benefit.

== Charts ==
=== Weekly charts ===
Chart (2000)	Peak position
Australia (ARIA)	7
Canada (Nielsen SoundScan)	1
Canada Rock/Alternative (RPM)	2
Europe (Eurochart Hot 100)	44
Germany (GfK)	98
Ireland (IRMA)	27
Italy (FIMI)	6
Netherlands (Single Top 100)	33
New Zealand (Recorded Music NZ)	42
Norway (VG-lista)	5
Portugal (AFP)	7
Scottish Singles Sales (Official Charts)	18
Spain (Promusicae)	5
Sweden (Sverigetopplistan)	40
Switzerland (Schweizer Hitparade)	83
UK Singles (Official Charts)	22
UK Rock & Metal (Official Charts)	1
US Billboard Hot 100	49
US Alternative Airplay (Billboard)	10
US Mainstream Rock (Billboard)	3

=== Year-end charts ===
Chart (2000)	Position
US Mainstream Rock Tracks (Billboard)	39
US Modern Rock Tracks (Billboard)	75

== Release history ==
Region	Date	Format(s)	Label(s)	Ref.
United States	April 11, 2000	Radio	Epic	
United States	April 25, 2000	CD	Epic	
United Kingdom	May 1, 2000	7-inch vinyl; CD	Epic	
Japan	May 3, 2000	CD	SME	
