= Grievance (song) =

2000 song by Pearl Jam

Song by Pearl Jam

from the album Binaural
- Released: May 16, 2000
- Recorded: September 1999 – January 2000 at Studio Litho, Seattle, Washington
- Genre: Alternative rock
- Length: 3:14
- Label: Epic
- Songwriter(s): Eddie Vedder
- Producer(s): Tchad Blake, Pearl Jam

"Grievance" is a song by the American rock band Pearl Jam. Written by vocalist Eddie Vedder, "Grievance" is the ninth track on the band's sixth studio album, Binaural (2000).

== Origin and recording ==
"Grievance" was written by vocalist Eddie Vedder. Vedder about the song:

It's bad when you have writer's block in the studio and you've got three songs without words and four days left. It pretty much happened on the last record. And the worst part was they were songs that I had written. I had written the music to "Insignificance" and "Grievance". I just wasn't happy with what I had so I kept working on it and scrapping it and staying up at night, playing piano melodies to make it be the best thing. And it worked, finally. That causes hell in a relationship, that's all I'll tell you.

== Lyrics ==
Vedder took inspiration from the 1999 WTO protests in Seattle, Washington when writing "Grievance". When speaking about "Grievance" in an interview, Vedder stated:

I think technology went wrong somewhere. It just went into the wrong direction. Instead of helping us and freeing us, it seems to enslave us. That's what I talk about in "Grievance", about the dangers and what a lot of people don't see or don't want to see. There's the line, "For every tool they lend us a loss of independence" and it's true. Everything happens so fast. The technology is supposed to make everything simple, easy. It tries to make us believe that it's some sort of freedom we have. Of course, it's easy and comfortable if you can do all your shopping via the internet, if you don't need to leave the house to do anything. But, on the other hand, what is going to happen? You lose touch with people. You don't meet new people except on the internet and whatever you do can be traced. They know everything about you; they know what you buy; they know which papers you read, how long you stay on a page and they look at your statistics and they're going to offer you the products they think you might buy – most of them you don't really need anyway. What is going to happen to individuality?

== Reception ==
At the 2001 Grammy Awards, "Grievance" received a nomination for Best Hard Rock Performance.

== Live performances ==
The band played "Grievance" when it appeared on the Late Show with David Letterman in April 2000 in support of Binaural. The song was first performed live in concert at the band's May 10, 2000 concert in Bellingham, Washington at the Mount Baker Theatre. Live performances of "Grievance" can be found on the "Light Years" single and various official bootlegs. Performances of the song are also included on the DVDs Touring Band 2000 and Live at the Garden.
