= Corduroy (song) =

Song by Pearl Jam

from the album Vitalogy
- Released: 22 November 1994
- Recorded: January–February 1994
- Studio: Bad Animals, Seattle, Washington
- Genre: Grunge
- Length: 4:37
- Label: Epic
- Composer(s): Dave Abbruzzese; Jeff Ament; Stone Gossard; Mike McCready; Eddie Vedder
- Lyricist(s): Eddie Vedder
- Producer(s): Brendan O'Brien, Pearl Jam

"Corduroy" is a song by the American alternative rock band Pearl Jam. The song is the eighth track on the band's third studio album, Vitalogy (1994). Despite the lack of a commercial single release, the song managed to reach number 13 on the Billboard Modern Rock Tracks chart. The song was included on Pearl Jam's 2004 greatest hits album, rearviewmirror (Greatest Hits 1991–2003).

== Lyrics ==
The lyrical content for "Corduroy" can be interpreted in many ways, but one common theory is that they are about the pressures of fame. In an interview, vocalist Eddie Vedder stated:

It is about a relationship but not between two people. It's more one person's relationship with a million people. In fact, that song's almost a little too obvious for me. That's why instead of a lyric sheet we put in an X-ray of my teeth from last January and they are all in very bad shape, which was analogous to my head at the time.

Regarding the song's title, Vedder stated:

Yeah, that song was based on a remake of the brown corduroy jacket that I wore. I think I got mine for 12 bucks, and it was being sold for like $650. The ultimate one as far as being co-opted was that there was a guy on TV, predictably patterned, I guess, after the way I was looking those days, with long hair and an Army T-shirt. They put this new character on a soap opera, so there was a guy, more handsome than I, parading around on General Hospital. And the funny thing is, that guy was Ricky Martin.

== Reception ==
Without being released as a single, "Corduroy" peaked at number 22 on the Billboard Mainstream Rock Tracks chart and number 13 on the Billboard Modern Rock Tracks chart in 1995. Al Weisel of Rolling Stone called the song "hard edged and catchy." Chris True of AllMusic described it as "simple, straightforward rock, the kind that Pearl Jam excelled at." He added, "Classic Pearl Jam—earnest lyrics and vocals, powerful classic sounding guitars, loose yet in control rhythm section, bass driven and tension filled breakdown (with Eddie mumbling in the background, of course) is all here, even down to the loose jam style outro."

"Corduroy" can be heard in a 2008 advertisement for Conservation International that features Harrison Ford. The song was also featured in the Cold Case episode "The Long Blue Line" in 2009. The "Corduroy - Alternate take" version of the song is featured at the end of Episode 3: "War" of Super Pumped. A live version is used by The Ringer's Bill Simmons as the intro music for his eponymous podcast.

== Live performances ==
"Corduroy" was first performed live at the band's performance of 15 March 1994 at the Fabulous Fox Theatre in St. Louis, MO. The song has become a concert favorite, although in concert it is generally played at a considerably faster tempo. Some live performances are preceded by a brief jam of Pink Floyd's "Interstellar Overdrive". Live performances of "Corduroy" can be found on the live album Live on Two Legs, various official bootlegs, the iTunes exclusive release The Bridge School Collection, Vol. 1, the Live at the Gorge 05/06 box set, and the live album Live at Lollapalooza 2007. Performances of the song are also included on the DVDs Touring Band 2000, Live at the Showbox, Immagine in Cornice and Let’s Play Two (this version has been used in the intro of every episode of The Bill Simmons Podcast since Simmons' departure from ESPN). The version of the song on The Bridge School Collection, Vol. 1 is an acoustic performance that has some lyrical changes towards the end, as well as a complete tempo change, with the song being played much slower and which more emphasis on Vedder's voice. There are also no drums in this version, with the percussion being played on a set of bongos. This version of the song was recorded live at the Bridge School Benefit.

== Charts ==
=== Weekly charts ===
Chart (1995)	Peak position
US Radio Songs (Billboard)	53
US Alternative Airplay (Billboard)	13
US Mainstream Rock (Billboard)	22

=== Year-end charts ===
Chart (1995)	Position
US Modern Rock Tracks (Billboard)	38
