= Tone (Jeff Ament album) =

Studio album by Jeff Ament
- Released: September 16, 2008
- Recorded: 2000–2008 at Horseback Court, Blue Mountain, Montana
- Genre: Alternative rock
- Length: 32:51
- Label: Monkeywrench

Jeff Ament chronology
Tone (2008)	While My Heart Beats (2012)

Tone is the debut solo album of American rock bassist and Pearl Jam-member Jeff Ament, released September 16, 2008, on Monkeywrench Records. 3,000 copies of the album were pressed and distributed through independent record stores across the United States, as well as through Pearl Jam's official website. The album has also been made available as a digital download via Pearl Jam's official website for US$4.99.

== Background ==
The album contains ten songs written over a span of 12 years. It features a raw, experimental sound and was recorded by Ament over an eight-year period at Horseback Court in Blue Mountain, Montana, which is Ament's home studio, and completed in 2008. Tone was mixed by Brett Eliason, who had previously worked with Ament as Pearl Jam's sound engineer. Its cover art was created by Ament.

Former Three Fish drummer and frequent Ament collaborator Richard Stuverud contributed his drumming to seven songs on the album, and King's X frontman Doug Pinnick contributed lead vocals to the song "Doubting Thomasina". Pinnick would later in 2010 feature as the lead singer of another Ament/Stuverud project, Tres Mts. "The Forest" was recorded by Pearl Jam; however, vocalist Eddie Vedder never got around to adding vocals to the track. The instrumental version by Pearl Jam is featured in the 2007 Pearl Jam concert film, Immagine in Cornice. The version of the song on Tone features vocals by Ament and music taken from the original demo version of the song.

== Track listing ==
All tracks are written by Jeff Ament.

No.	Title	Length
1.	"Just Like That"	1:33
2.	"Give Me a Reason"	3:15
3.	"Bulldozer"	2:44
4.	"Relapse"	4:33
5.	"Say Goodbye"	3:13
6.	"The Forest"	3:08
7.	"Life of a Salesman"	4:19
8.	"Doubting Thomasina"	4:08
9.	"Hi-Line"	4:03
10.	"The Only Cloud in the Sky"	1:55

== Personnel ==
- Jeff Ament – all instruments (unless otherwise noted), additional recording, artwork

Additional musicians and production

- Matt Bayles, John Burton – additional recording
- Brett Eliason – recording, mixing
- Joe Gastwirt – mastering
- Doug Pinnick – vocals on "Doubting Thomasina"
- Richard Stuverud – drums, background vocals
