= War Babies (band) =

American rock band

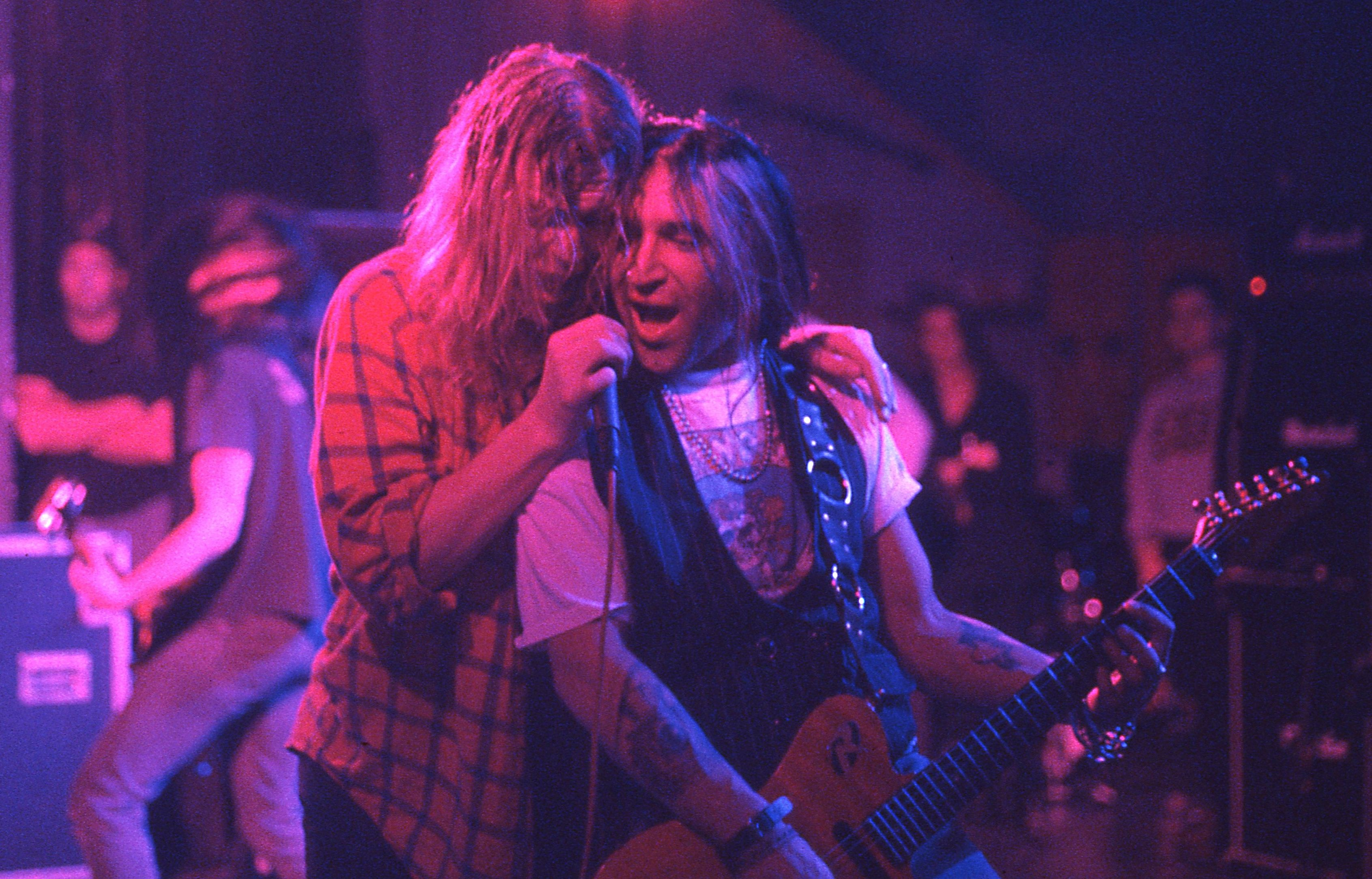

Background information
- Origin: Seattle, Washington, U.S.
- Genres: Hard rock, glam metal
- Years active: 1988–1993, 2025
- Labels: Columbia, UlfTone Music, Bad Reputation
- Spinoff of: TKO, Suicide Squad
- Members: Brad Sinsel (vocals); Guy Lacey (guitars); Tommy "Gunn" McMullin (guitars); Shawn Trotter (bass); Richard Stuverud (drums)

War Babies was an American rock band formed in Seattle, Washington in 1988, fronted by former TKO vocalist Brad Sinsel. Although associated with hard rock, the band's sound incorporated some elements of grunge music. They only released one album, in 1992, the self-titled War Babies.

== History ==
After the break-up of TKO, vocalist Brad Sinsel and guitarist Rick Pierce (ex-TKO, Q5, Ze Whiz Kidz) teamed up for a project called Suicide Squad, aided by Seattle drummer, Richard Stuverud who had played with punk rock band, The Fastbacks, and was working with the power metal band Fifth Angel. Suicide Squad released the one-off album, Live it While You Can, (1988), an EP engineered by Jack Endino, on the Music For Nations label in Europe.

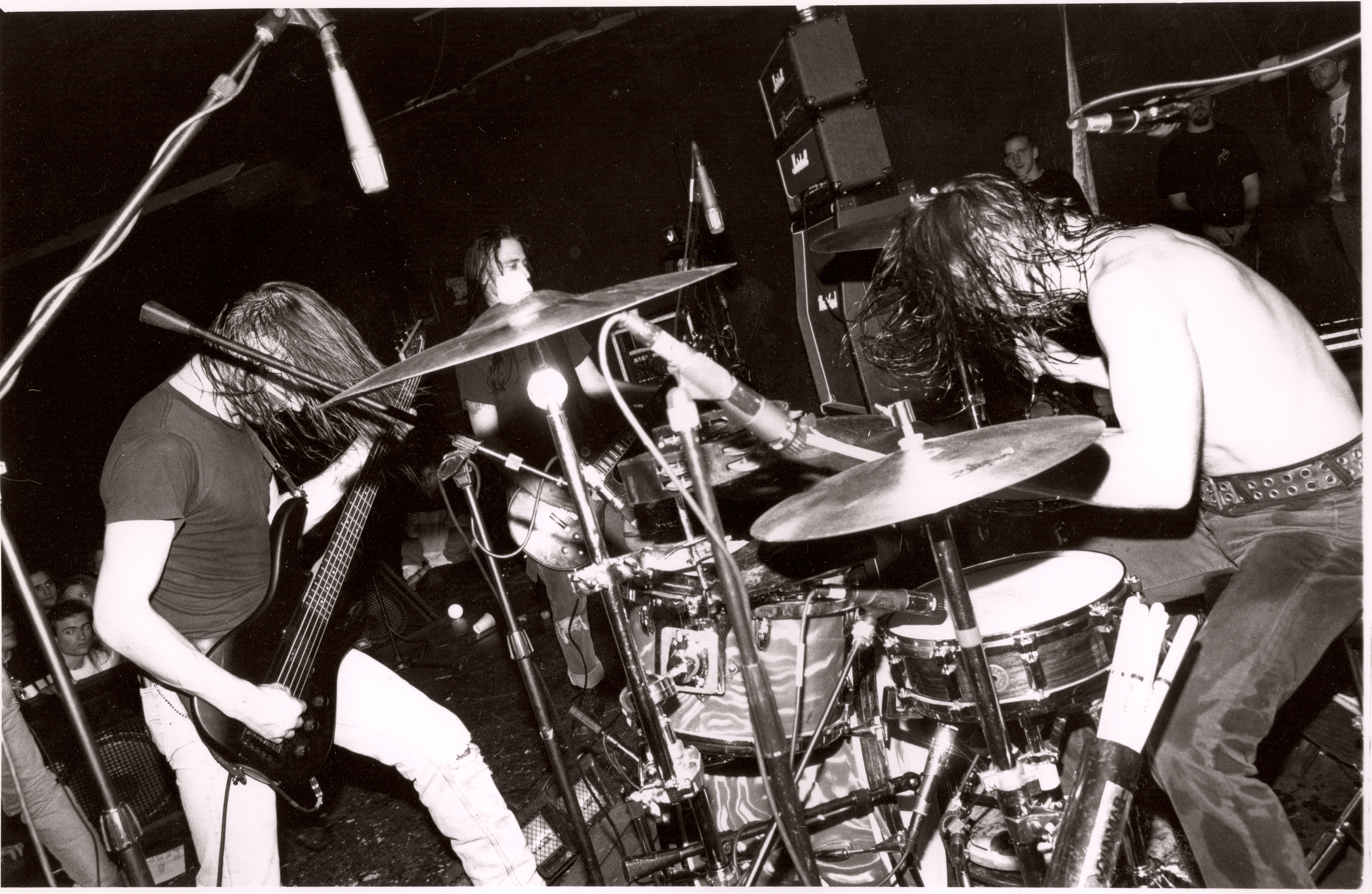
Shawn, Guy and Richard playing at "Under the Rail" in Seattle

After Suicide Squad, Sinsel spent time in Los Angeles but was eventually contacted by Stuverud to check out his new band, War Babies with guitarist, Tommy 'Gunn' McMullin. Stuverud and McMullin persuaded Sinsel to join War Babies and the band began to gig around the Seattle area, playing with popular local bands such as Mother Love Bone, Alice in Chains, Soundgarden, and others. In 1990, at the time of Andrew Wood's death and the end of Mother Love Bone, Jeff Ament joined War Babies for a brief period before he left to join Stone Gossard's new band, Pearl Jam.

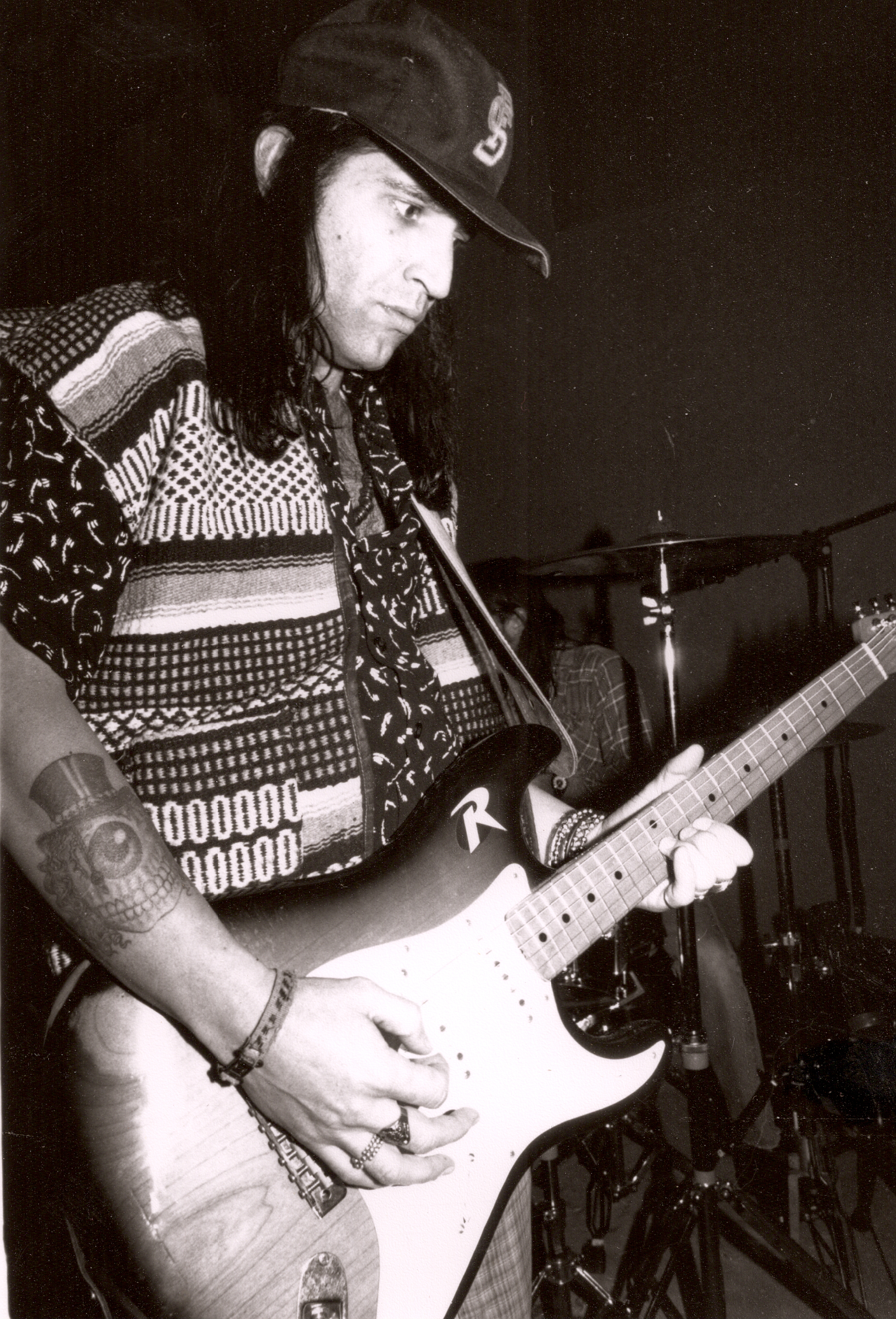
Tommy play at a rehearsal.

War Babies, featuring the line-up of Brad Sinsel (vocals), Tommy "Gunn" McMullin (guitars), Guy Lacey (guitars), Shawn Trotter (bass), and Richard Stuverud (drums) scored a contract with Columbia Records in 1991. They recorded their debut album, War Babies (1992) at A&M Studios in Hollywood, CA with noted producer, Thom Panunzio and engineer, Bill Kennedy. Their first single and MTV video, "Hang Me Up", was co-written by McMullin and Paul Stanley of Kiss. Two other singles were released, "Blue Tomorrow" (a song dedicated to Andrew Wood, who was a friend of Sinsel and McMullin's), and the power ballad, "Cry Yourself to Sleep", co-written by Sinsel and Stanley. The song "In The Wind" can be heard in the 1992 film Buffy the Vampire Slayer but was not included on the official soundtrack.

By 1993, the War Babies' sound was deemed too glam metal, and the band broke up. They played their last show on June 6, 1992, as part of the "Rock the Environment" benefit with headliners Queensrÿche, Heart, The Walkabouts, Metal Church, Bananafish, and Rumors of the Big Wave, among others.

War Babies was re-issued by German label UlfTone Music in 2003 and French company Bad Reputation in 2007; both contain radio edits of "Hang Me Up" and "Cry Yourself to Sleep" and an alternate 'guitar version' of the latter as bonus tracks.

After War Babies, McMullin started the band The Dead Letters while Lacey and Trotter formed 8 Days In Jail and later joined Seattle punk rock band Sledgeback. McMullin has been fronting Gunn and the Damage Done for the past several years; they released their debut album, Bury My Heart, in 2010.

Stuverud joined and recorded with several Seattle bands, the most notable being Three Fish, a side-project featuring Pearl Jam bassist, Jeff Ament and Robbi Robb of Tribe After Tribe. Three Fish released the albums Three Fish (1996) and The Quiet Table (1999), through Epic Records. Stuverud also contributed to Tribe After Tribe albums, Pearls Before Swine (1997) and M.O.A.B. (2007). Stuverud and Ament's other collaborations include Tres Mts., Three Mountains (2011), with Doug Pinnick of King's X and guest guitarist Mike McCready, and RNDM (pronounced "random") with singer/songwriter Joseph Arthur; RNDM issued their debut album, Acts, in 2012, and followed up in 2016 with the album, Ghost Riding.

Sinsel's recent projects include American Standard with Flipp guitarist Brynn Arens who issued the "Send Me An Angel" b/w "My Only Friend" single in 2009, Americana act The McClellans, and Angels Of Dresden. The latter released a digital single, "Doomday", via Suna Sounds in May 2014, with a guest appearance by Pearl Jam guitarist Mike McCready.

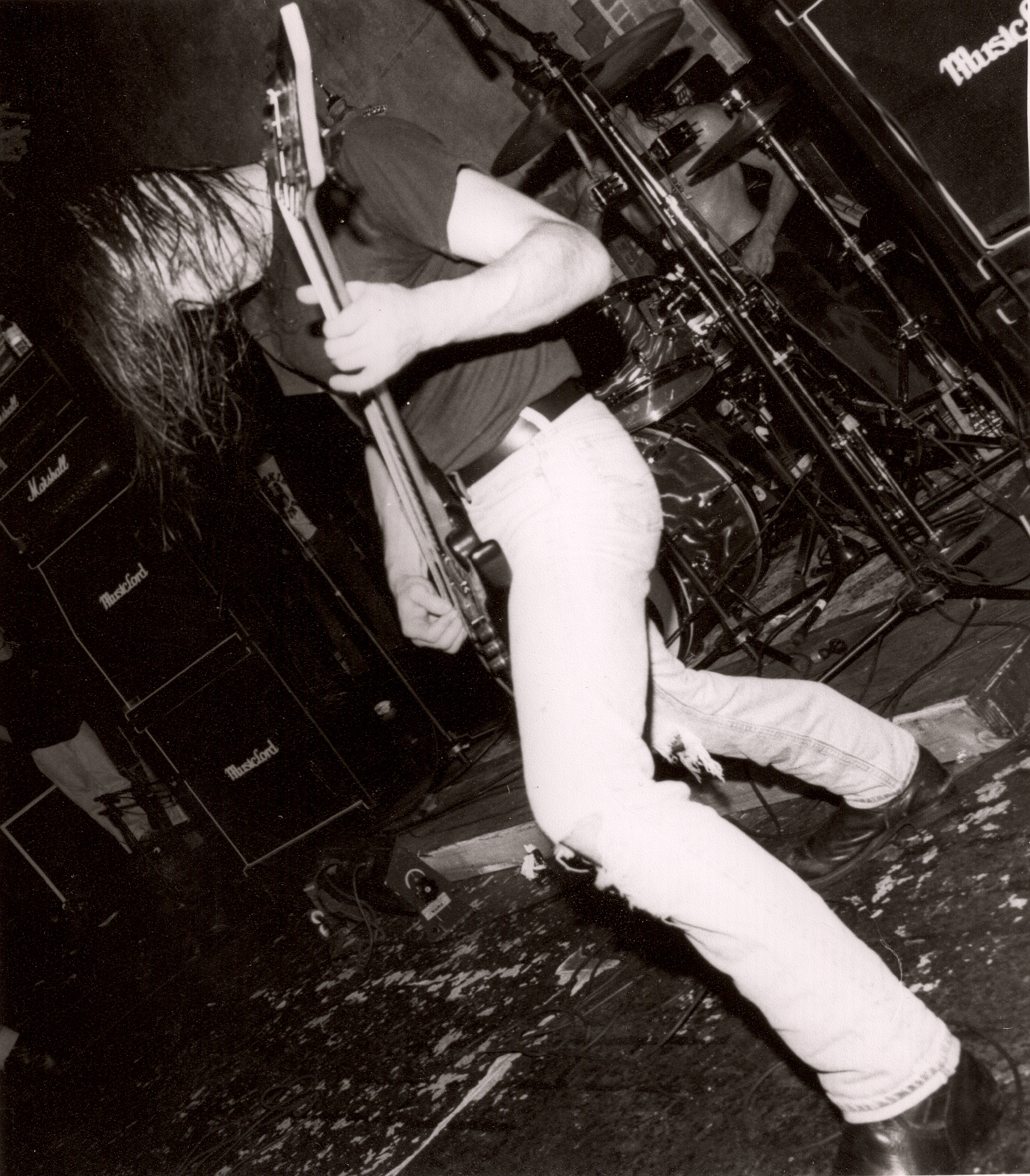

The band reunited in October 2025 to play gigs for the first time in over 30 years.

== Discography ==
=== Studio albums ===
- War Babies (1992)
- Vault (2024)

=== Singles ===
- "Hang Me Up" (1991)
- "Cry Yourself to Sleep" (1992)
- "Blue Tomorrow" (1992)

=== Soundtrack appearances ===
- "In the Wind" (from Buffy the Vampire Slayer) (1992)

=== Music videos ===
- "Hang Me Up" (1991)
- "Blue Tomorrow" (1992)
