= Spluii Numa =

- Origin: Seattle
- Genres: Punk rock Grunge
- Years active: 1983–1984

Spluii Numa was a hardcore punk band from Federal Way, Washington formed in 1982. Its members consisted of Erik Aasen (vocals), Charles Quain (guitar), Keith Strobel (bass), briefly Harold Hollingsworth (vocals), and Alex Shumway. Mudhoney's Steve Turner was also a guitarist for the band for a short amount of time before leaving the band to join Mr. Epp and the Calculations. Quain was also a member of the band Limp Richerds that also had at times consisted of Mudhoney's Mark Arm and Steve Turner. Shumway had also played one show with Limp Richerds, playing a Band Aid container.

The origin of the name "Spluii Numa" comes from graffiti written on a locker at Shumway's highschool. A person had written "John Lennon lives!" on a school locker. Someone later crossed out the word 'lives' and wrote "went spluii numa!" (The words connoting shooting and blood spatter.)

Upon the band's demise in 1984, Shumway went on to link up with Mark Arm, Steve Turner, Jeff Ament, and Stone Gossard to form the influential grunge band Green River.

After Green River broke up in 1988, Arm and Turner later went on to form the band Mudhoney. Ament and Gossard went on to form Mother Love Bone and later Pearl Jam. Shumway attended university in Japan, and went on to work in politics.
