= The Quiet Table =

Studio album by Three Fish
- Released: June 1, 1999
- Recorded: February–September 1, 1997 at Horseback Court, Blue Mountain, Montana
- Genre: Alternative rock
- Length: 47:57
- Language: English
- Label: Epic
- Producer: Brett Eliason, Three Fish

Three Fish chronology
Three Fish (1996)	The Quiet Table (1999)

Professional ratings
Review scores
Source	Rating
Allmusic	3/5 stars

The Quiet Table is the second studio album by the American rock band Three Fish. It was released on June 1, 1999 through Epic Records.

== Overview ==
Three Fish is a musical collaboration between Jeff Ament of Pearl Jam, Robbi Robb of Tribe After Tribe, and Richard Stuverud of the Fastbacks. The album's recording sessions took place from February 1997 to September 1997 at Horseback Court in Blue Mountain, Montana, which is Ament's home studio. The band worked with producer Brett Eliason, who had previously worked with Ament as Pearl Jam's sound engineer. The album was mixed by Eliason. The album's cover art was photographed by Seattle graphic design firm Ames Bros. The album's songs continued the theme of the band's debut album, Three Fish, of combining rock music with mystical-style Eastern music. Stephen Thomas Erlewine of Allmusic said that "while it can seem a little turgid at times, it's an ambitious project that often pays off in intriguing songs and evocative sonic textures." The band toured throughout 1999 in support of The Quiet Table.

== Track listing ==
All lyrics are written by Robbi Robb, except where noted.

No.	Title	Lyrics	Music	Length
1.	"Shiva and the Astronaut"		Jeff Ament, Robb	4:54
2.	"Tremor Void"	Richard Stuverud	Stuverud	2:57
3.	"Myth of Abdou"		Ament	4:48
4.	"Once in a Day"		Robb	3:48
5.	"All These Things"		Ament	3:50
6.	"Timeless"		Robb	5:06
7.	"Hummingbird"		Robb	3:57
8.	"My Only Foe"	Ament	Ament	3:21
9.	"Transporting"	Stuverud	Stuverud	3:02
10.	"Found a Window"	Stuverud, Cathrine Veikos	Stuverud	3:26
11.	"Resonate"	Ament	Ament	3:51
12.	"Chantreuse"		Robb	4:57

=== LP Track listing ===
All lyrics are written by Robb, except where noted.

No.	Title	Lyrics	Music	Length
1.	"Shiva and the Astronaut"		Ament, Robb	4:54
2.	"Tremor Void"	Stuverud	Stuverud	2:57
3.	"Myth of Abdou"		Ament, Stuverud, Robb	4:48
4.	"Let It Go"		Stuverud	3:41
5.	"Once in a Day"		Robb	3:48
6.	"All These Things"		Ament, Stuverud, Robb	3:50
7.	"Timeless"		Robb	5:06
8.	"Hummingbird"		Robb	3:57
9.	"My Only Foe"	Ament	Ament	3:21
10.	"Transporting"	Stuverud	Stuverud	3:02
11.	"Landmine"	Ament	Ament	2:55
12.	"Found a Window"	Stuverud, Cathrine Veikos	Stuverud	3:26
13.	"Stand Under"		Robb	5:17
14.	"Resonate"	Ament	Ament	3:51
15.	"Chantreuse"		Robb	4:57

== Personnel ==
Three Fish

- Jeff Ament – bass guitar, guitar, keyboards, vocals, fretless bass, djembe, 12-string bass guitar
- Robbi Robb – acoustic guitar, guitar, percussion, piano, drums, vocals, harmony vocals
- Richard Stuverud – guitar, percussion, piano, drums, saxophone, vocals

Additional musicians and production

- Pat Aki, John Burton – assistance
- Ames Bros – photos and art
- Cary Ecklund – keyboards
- Brett Eliason – production, mixing
- Joe Gastwirt – mastering
- Three Fish – production
