= War Babies (War Babies album) =

Studio album by War Babies
- Released: 1992
- Genre: Hard rock; glam metal
- Length: 48:50 (original release)
- Label: Columbia

Professional ratings
Review scores
Source	Rating
Sleeze Roxx	link

War Babies is the only album by the band War Babies, who disbanded in 1993. The album was released by Columbia Records in 1991 and re-issued by German label UlfTone Music in 2003 and French company Bad Reputation in 2007.

The album produced three singles, "Hang Me Up" (co-written by Tommy McMullin and Paul Stanley), "Cry Yourself to Sleep" (co-written by Brad Sinsel and Stanley), and "Blue Tomorrow" (a song dedicated to Andrew Wood from Mother Love Bone, who overdosed two years earlier). In addition, the song "In the Wind" is featured in the 1992 film Buffy the Vampire Slayer.

Sinsel later commented about his writing session with Stanley, calling him, "one of the biggest egomaniacs I have ever come across in my career. He was rude and disrespectful and at some point, I'm playing (TKO's) "Kill the Pain" while we're warming up. So, he says, "I'm going to start playing some stuff and you just tell me if you hear anything". What came out of it was just "Kill the Pain" backwards. At some point he goes, "how about in this part we do blah, blah, blah" and it was off of Love Gun. By now I've had enough of his remarks and I just looked at him and said, "look, it's not like I'm like Tommy [McMullin]" and he says, "what do you mean?" and I said, "it's not like I own a KISS doll, or something."

== Track listing ==
1. "Hang Me Up" – 4:04
2. "In the Wind" – 4:25
3. "Cry Yourself to Sleep" – 4:46
4. "Sweetwater" – 4:15
5. "Sea of Madness" – 4:56
6. "Blue Tomorrow" - 5:56
7. "Satellite" – 4:23
8. "Death Valley of Love" – 3:45
9. "Big Big Sun" – 3:28
10. "Killing Time" – 4:40
11. "Care (Man I Just Don't)" – 4:08

Bonus tracks (on 2003 UlfTone and 2007 Bad Reputation re-issues)

12. "Hang Me Up" (edit)
13. "Cry Yourself to Sleep" (single)
14. "Cry Yourself to Sleep" (guitar)

== Credits ==
Band

- Brad Sinsel – lead vocals and acoustic guitar
- Tommy "Gunn" McMullin – lead guitar and background vocals
- Guy Lacey – rhythm guitar and background vocals
- Shawn Trotter – bass and background vocals
- Richard Stuverud – drums, percussion and background vocals

Additional musicians

- Benmont Tench – keyboards
- Mike "Bubba" Abercrombie – keyboards
- Mike Lennon – background vocals
- Mark Lennon – background vocals
- Kip Lennon – background vocals
- Todd Cerney – background vocals (2)
- Thom Panunzio – percussion

Production

- Thom Panunzio – producer
- Bill Kennedy - engineer
- Nick Terzo – executive producer
