= Dry as a Bone/Rehab Doll =

Compilation album by Green River
- Released: September 13, 1990
- Recorded: March 1985 – January 1988
- Genre: Grunge
- Length: 57:45
- Label: Sub Pop
- Producer: Bruce Calder, Jack Endino

Green River chronology
Rehab Doll (1988)	Dry as a Bone/Rehab Doll (1990)

Professional ratings
Review scores
Source	Rating
AllMusic	4.5/5 stars
Q	3/5 stars
Select	4/5 medals

Dry as a Bone/Rehab Doll is a compilation album by the American rock band Green River. It was released on September 13, 1990, through Sub Pop Records.

== Overview ==
Released in 1990 by Sub Pop Records, the album combines Green River's two releases for the label: Dry as a Bone (1987) and Rehab Doll (1988). It also includes the bonus tracks "Ain't Nothing to Do" (recorded in 1985), "Searchin'" (recorded in 1986), and "Queen Bitch" (recorded in 1987). Steve Huey of AllMusic said, "Since Dry as a Bone/Rehab Doll is more energetic and less murky than many proto-grunge artifacts, it's arguably the most effective and enduring building block in the music's early evolution."

== Track listing ==
All songs written by Jeff Ament, Mark Arm, Bruce Fairweather, Stone Gossard, and Alex Vincent, except where noted:

Recorded for Dry as a Bone:

1. "This Town" – 3:23
2. "P.C.C." – 3:44
3. "Ozzie" (Tales of Terror) – 3:11
4. "Unwind" – 4:42
5. "Baby Takes" – 4:24
6. "Searchin'" – 3:48

Recorded in March 1985:

7. "Ain't Nothing to Do" (Stiv Bators, Cheetah Chrome) – 2:38

Recorded for Rehab Doll:

8. "Queen Bitch" (David Bowie) – 2:58
9. "Forever Means" – 4:20
10. "Rehab Doll" (Arm, Paul Solger) – 3:23
11. "Swallow My Pride" (Arm, Steve Turner) – 2:59
12. "Together We'll Never" – 4:01
13. "Smilin' and Dyin'" – 3:23
14. "Porkfist" – 3:13
15. "Take a Dive" – 3:28
16. "One More Stitch" – 3:53

== Personnel ==
Green River

- Jeff Ament – bass guitar, vocals
- Mark Arm – vocals
- Bruce Fairweather – guitars
- Stone Gossard – guitars, vocals
- Alex Vincent – drums, percussion

Production

- Bruce Calder, Jack Endino – production
- Jane Higgins – layout
- Linda Owens – original album cover layout
- Charles Peterson – photos, layout
