= Three Fish (album) =

- Cover to the Compact Disc version of the album

Studio album by Three Fish
- Released: June 11, 1996
- Recorded: August 1994 – January 1996
- Studios: John & Stu's Place and Avast, Seattle, Washington
- Genre: Alternative rock
- Length: 58:05
- Language: English
- Label: Epic
- Producers: John Goodmanson, Three Fish

Three Fish chronology
Three Fish (1996)	The Quiet Table (1999)

Vinyl LP
- Artwork for the 1996 vinyl edition

Three Fish is the debut studio album by the American rock band Three Fish. It was released on June 11, 1996, through Epic Records.

== Overview ==
Three Fish is a musical collaboration between Jeff Ament of Pearl Jam, Robbi Robb of Tribe After Tribe, and Richard Stuverud of the Fastbacks. The album's recording sessions took place from August 1994 to January 1996 at John & Stu's Place and Avast Recording Co. in Seattle, Washington. The band worked with producer John Goodmanson, who also mixed the album. The album's cover art was illustrated by Ames Design. The album's songs combine rock music with mystical-style Eastern music.

== Critical reception ==
Professional ratings
Review scores
Source	Rating
AllMusic	3/5 stars
Rolling Stone	3/5 stars

The album received critical recognition. David Fricke of Rolling Stone said, "The whole thing is a weird mix – folky self-obsession, crackling pop, heavy, metallic sighing – but Three Fish is definitely worth, in the words of one song, 'a lovely meander.'" Music videos were made for the songs "Laced" and "Song for a Dead Girl". The Los Angeles Times wrote: "An earthy, organic trio that eschews most traces of Pearl Jam's carefully constructed, hard-driving riff-rock, the band leans on a no-holds-barred sound that rings with the emotive, loose-limbed flow of Middle Eastern music."

== Track listing ==
All tracks are written by Jeff Ament and Robbi Robb.

No.	Title	Length
1.	"Solitude"	4:50
2.	"Song for a Dead Girl"	4:28
3.	"Silence at the Bottom"	4:03
4.	"The Intelligent Fish"	2:44
5.	"Zagreb"	3:20
6.	"All Messed Up"	5:34
7.	"Here in the Darkness"	4:23
8.	"The Half Intelligent Fish"	2:40
9.	"Strangers in My Head"	4:44
10.	"A Lovely Meander"	3:50
11.	"Build"	1:33
12.	"Stupid Fish"	1:53
13.	"Secret Place"	3:55
14.	"Elusive Ones"	6:51
15.	"Laced"	3:17

=== LP track listing ===
All tracks are written by Ament and Robbi Robb.

No.	Title	Length
1.	"Solitude"	4:50
2.	"Song for a Dead Girl"	4:28
3.	"Silence at the Bottom"	4:03
4.	"The Intelligent Fish"	2:44
5.	"Zagreb"	3:20
6.	"All Messed Up"	5:34
7.	"Here in the Darkness"	4:23
8.	"If Miles Were Alive..."	1:17
9.	"The Half Intelligent Fish"	2:40
10.	"Strangers in My Head"	4:44
11.	"A Lovely Meander"	3:50
12.	"Elusive Ones"	6:51
13.	"Build"	1:33
14.	"Stupid Fish"	1:53
15.	"Can I Come Along?"	3:27
16.	"The Easy Way"	4:51
17.	"Secret Place"	3:55
18.	"Laced"	3:17

== Personnel ==
Three Fish

- Jeff Ament – organ, bass guitar, guitar, percussion, electric guitar, background vocals, 12-string guitar, djembe, fretless bass, photography
- Robbi Robb – acoustic guitar, guitar, percussion, electric guitar, sitar, vocals, background vocals, 12-string guitar
- Richard Stuverud – drums, background vocals, steel drums

Additional musicians and production

- Barry Ament, Chris McGann – woodcuts
- Ames Design – artwork
- Cary Ecklund – guitar, keyboards, background vocals, mellotron
- John Goodmanson – production, recording, mixing, engineering
- Stone Gossard – keyboards on "Strangers in My Head"
- Stuart Hallerman – recording
- Bob Ludwig – mastering
- Three Fish – production, photography
