= Cover Songs =

Compilation album Bootleg by Melvins
- Released: 2010
- Genre: Sludge metal
- Label: Matrix / Runout

Cover Songs is a UK bootleg by Melvins, released on black and colored vinyl in 2010, in a wrap-round sleeve.

The album contains covers of songs by bands from the 1970s and 1980s.

== Track listing ==
Side 1

1. "Arnie" (Warlock Pinchers cover) / "White Punks on Dope" (The Tubes cover)
2. "Today Your Love Tomorrow The World" (Ramones cover)
3. "Jerkin' Krokus" (Mott the Hoople cover)
4. "Return of Spiders" (Alice Cooper cover)
5. "Rocket Reducer # 62" (MC5 cover)
6. "Lexicon Devil" (Germs cover)

Side 2

1. "Venus in Furs" (Velvet Underground cover)
2. "God of Thunder" (Kiss cover)
3. "Leech" (Green River cover)
4. "California Uber Alles" (with Jello Biafra) (Dead Kennedys cover)
5. "Love Canal" (Flipper cover)
6. "Someday" (Flipper cover)
