= Thank You and Good Night =

Thank You and Good Night may refer to:

- Thank You & Goodnight, a 2018 album by Boyzone
  - Thank You & Goodnight Tour, tour supporting the album
- "Thank You and Good Night", an episode of The Marvelous Mrs. Maisel, 2017
- "Thank You and Good Night", an episode of The Real Housewives of New York City, 2017
- "Thank You and Good Night", by Weezer from SZNZ: Summer, 2022

== See also ==
- Thank You...Goodnight!, a 2002 album by Great White
- Thank You, Goodnight: The Bon Jovi Story, a documentary series about the rock band Bon Jovi
- Thank You, Goodnight!, a 2003 album White Light Motorcade
