= Rehab Doll =

Studio album by Green River
- Released: June 1988
- Recorded: July 1987 – January 1988
- Studios: Steve Lawson Productions (Seattle, Washington); Reciprocal (Seattle, Washington)
- Genres: Grunge; alternative metal
- Length: 28:40
- Label: Sub Pop
- Producer: Bruce Calder

Green River chronology
Dry as a Bone (1987)	Rehab Doll (1988)	Dry as a Bone/Rehab Doll (1990)

Professional ratings
Review scores
Source	Rating
AllMusic	2.5/5 stars 3/5 stars
Pitchfork	7.9/10
PopMatters	8/10
Uncut	3.5/5 stars

Rehab Doll is the only studio album by the American rock band Green River, released in June 1988 through Sub Pop Records.

== Overview ==
Almost immediately following the release of Dry as a Bone, the group re-entered the studio in July 1987 to begin production on its first full-length album, Rehab Doll. The band initially started work on the album with producer Jack Endino at Reciprocal Recording in Seattle, Washington, but the band switched to producer Bruce Calder and changed its recording location to Steve Lawson Productions in Seattle. A stylistic division developed between bassist Jeff Ament and guitarist Stone Gossard on one side, and vocalist Mark Arm on the other. According to Shumway, Ament and Gossard wanted to be "more rock", while Arm wanted to explore punk rock. On October 31, 1987, Ament, Gossard, and guitarist Bruce Fairweather announced they were quitting the band.

Although the band members agreed to complete production of Rehab Doll over the next three months, Green River had ceased as a band by late October 1987. The band completed the album's recording sessions in January 1988. The song "Swallow My Pride" originally appeared on the band's debut EP, Come on Down, and the song "Together We'll Never" was previously released as a single through Tasque Force Records in 1986. Both songs were re-recorded for this album. The cassette version of Rehab Doll also contains a cover of the David Bowie song "Queen Bitch". The album's cover art was photographed by Charles Peterson and a small portion of the Frye Hotel in Seattle is seen in the background.

The album was released in June 1988 by Sub Pop Records. Reviewing for The Rocket, Andrea Vitalich gave the album a positive review, praising the album's eclectic nature, exploring "R&B hooks, psychedelic digressions, and acoustic angst with a metal edge" that make it "a deliciously sadistic mix". Ned Raggett of AllMusic called it "a record that sounded caught somewhere between grunge mania and metal/corp rock folly." It was reissued in 1990 as part of the Dry as a Bone/Rehab Doll compilation album.

In 2019, the album was re-released with a new mix by original producer Jack Endino, and 10 bonus tracks.

=== Band members' opinions ===
In later decades, the band members have held mixed opinions on Rehab Doll. Speaking to Rolling Stone, Gossard said:

"Rehab Doll has some good moments on it, and I think it was cool, but we were already going down the road of being torn apart from where we were going to go and how we were going to do it, and it was maybe less fun at that point."

Gossard also thought that the band's experimentation went too far. Shumway called the album "too polished" and believed the original pre-production demos with Jack Endino were superior to the final album mix, believing the drums sounded like a hair metal band such as Poison. Fairweather, upon relistening to Rehab Doll before Green River's 2008–2009 reunion, remarked that it sounded "prog-rocky," saying, "I had forgotten how much effort we put into doing that kind of stuff back then." On his vocal performances, Arm said: "The thing that strikes me about Rehab Doll is how it has rock riffs, and then I'm just spewing darkness over the top of it. That might not have been the best approach, but it's the approach I had." Steve Turner criticised the album's production as "awful".

== Track listing ==
All lyrics are written by Mark Arm; all music is composed by Stone Gossard, Jeff Ament, and Bruce Fairweather, except where noted.

Rehab Doll track listing
No.	Title	Music	Length
1.	"Forever Means"		4:20
2.	"Rehab Doll"	Paul Solger	3:23
3.	"Swallow My Pride"	Steve Turner	2:59
4.	"Together We'll Never"		4:01
5.	"Smilin' and Dyin'"		3:23
6.	"Porkfist"		3:13
7.	"Take a Dive"		3:28
8.	"One More Stitch"		3:53
Total length:			28:40

Cassette bonus track

No.	Title	Writer(s)	Length
9.	"Queen Bitch"	David Bowie	2:58

== Personnel ==
Green River

- Mark Arm – vocals, assistant production
- Stone Gossard – guitars, vocals, assistant production
- Bruce Fairweather – guitars
- Jeff Ament – bass guitar, vocals, assistant production, inner sleeve design
- Alex Vincent – drums, percussion

Additional musicians and production

- Bruce Calder – groaning, moaning, screeching on "Porkfist", engineering, production
- Jack Endino – pre-production recording
- Kim Gordon – sonic groan
- Linda Owens – jacket design
- Charles Peterson – photography
- Sharka Stern – background vocals on "Swallow My Pride"
