= TKO (band) =

American rock band

- Origin: Seattle, Washington, U.S.
- Genres: Hard rock, heavy metal
- Years active: 1977–1986 (Reunions: 1994, 1997, 2001, 2018)
- Past members: Michael Alexich (deceased); Kjartan Kristoffersen; Scott Earl; Ken Mary; Adam 'Bomb' Brenner; Gary Thompson; Bill Durham; Tony Bortko (deceased); Rick Pierce; Mark Seidenverg; Darryl Siguenza

TKO is an American hard rock and heavy metal band from Seattle, Washington, which was mainly active between 1977 and 1986. The group's lead vocalist and only consistent member is Brad Sinsel.

The band has reunited sporadically for shows starting in 1994, their most recent live appearances taking place at the Legions of Metal II festival in Chicago in May 2018 and the Headbangers Open Air festival in Germany in July 2018, TKO's first ever European show.

== Biography ==
Sinsel, a native of Yakima, Washington, got his start in rock in the early 1970s in Ze Whiz Kidz, a flamboyant, influential glam rock band that opened a Seattle show by the New York Dolls in 1974. Eventually, he joined a reformed version of the band Mojo Hand, which featured co-founding members Mark Seidenverg (bass) and Darryl Siguenza (drums), along with former Whiz Kidz guitarist Rick Pierce. With the addition of Sinsel and Tony Bortko (guitar, keyboards) the band became TKO. Represented by managers who also worked with platinum sellers Heart, the band signed a major label recording contract in 1977, though it would be more than a year before the first album would appear.

The group released their Mike Flicker produced debut Let It Roll on the Infinity Records division of MCA Records in early 1979; it went on to sell roughly 150,000 copies. During this time the group had a type of glam rock image and fans compared their music favorably with The Who. TKO toured the U.S. extensively, including shows with the Kinks, Cheap Trick, AC/DC, Van Halen as well as Heart and made their way to Japan where they appeared at Japan Jam in 1979, with new rhythm section Evan Sheeley (bass) and Bill Durham (drums), both formerly with Yakima act Water Closet, in tow. TKO was unable to deliver a planned second album when Infinity went out of business and was absorbed by MCA in the spring of 1980. They recorded numerous songs slated for the 2nd Lp, which was not released until 2017 as "The Lost Demos."

By 1980, the line-up consisted of Sinsel, Sheeley, new drummer Gary Thompson and 17-year-old hot shot guitar player Adam Brenner, brought into the fold by Tony Bortko, who left shortly thereafter. Thompson and Brenner came from a local cover band named Tyrant which also featured future Queensrÿche vocalist Geoff Tate and bassist Scott Earl. Brenner quickly became a driving force and co-wrote most of the new material with Sinsel. Boasting a much grittier, more heavy metal oriented sound, the band would record their sophomore album, In Your Face, in 1981 with producer Rick Keefer at Sea West Studios in Oahu, HI but could not get signed to a record label. Brenner left in 1982 in order to pursue a solo career, surfacing as Adam Bomb and signed to Geffen Records for his 1984 debut Fatal Attraction. Pierce, Sheeley, and Thompson all left to join guitarist Floyd Rose and ., Q5, releasing the Steel The Light album in 1984.

After a period of inactivity, Sinsel put together a new TKO line-up consisting of former Culprit members, guitarist Kjartan Kristoffersen and bassist Scott Earl, and drummer Ken Mary from the band Strike. They began to play out around Seattle and with the help of Rick Keefer signed a record deal with Combat Records who would finally release In Your Face in 1984. The song "End of the Line", whose intro is taken from the classical piece "Toccata and Fugue in D minor", was also included on the 1984 Shrapnel Records compilation US Metal Vol. IV. TKO found a secure new fan base with the growing heavy metal audience and was part of a vibrant Seattle metal scene which included Metal Church, Queensrÿche, Rail and Culprit, among many others.

Sinsel would also contribute lead vocals to Burning at the Speed of Light (1985) by Thrasher, an all-star project initiated by Combat Records and led by the songwriting team of guitarist Andy 'Duck' MacDonald of Bible Black and drummer Carl Canedy of The Rods. Sinsel appeared on "Hot and Heavy" with MacDonald, Canedy and bassist Kenny Aaronson (Dust, Derringer, HSAS) and "Widowmaker", featuring Billy Sheehan (Talas, David Lee Roth, Mr. Big) on bass.

TKO toured the U.S. with the likes of Foreigner, Ted Nugent, Robin Trower and Dio to promote In Your Face before heading back in the studio with Rick Keefer for their third album. Released in 1986 on the Roadrunner label, Below the Belt was not as well received as its predecessor and featured Sinsel, Kristoffersen, Earl and Mary who soon left to join Alice Cooper. He was briefly replaced by Michael Alexich, an old friend of Sinsel; TKO would play their last show in 1986 at the Paramount Theater in Seattle.

A TKO line-up featuring Brad Sinsel, Evan Sheeley, Rick Pierce, Brynn Arens and Carl Canedy of The Rods recorded a cover of the Motörhead classic "Ace of Spades" in tribute to the late Lemmy Kilmister which became available as a digital download on January 21, 2016, with proceeds from the song going to the Ronnie James Dio "Stand Up and Shout Cancer Fund".

A four-piece TKO line-up composed of Sinsel, Sheeley, guitarist Kendall Bechtel (Fifth Angel, Q5, Sweet Sister Sam), and drummer Jeffrey McCormack (Q5, Nightshade, Heir Apparent) headlined the second night of the Legions of Metal II festival in Chicago on May 19, 2018 and appeared at Germany's Headbangers Open Air festival on July 27, the band's maiden gig in Europe, where they performed their classic In Your Face album in its entirety.

== Post-TKO activities ==
Following the end of TKO, Kristoffersen and Earl relocated to L.A. and formed The Bang Gang who released the Love Sells album in 1990, which contained the video/single "Young & the Restless", while Sinsel re-teamed with original TKO guitarist Rick Pierce to form Suicide Squad, aided by former The Fastbacks drummer Richard Stuverud, also former TKO drummer Ken Mary's replacement in Fifth Angel. Sinsel and Pierce shared bass duties in the studio and combined their first names to make up credited phantom bassist Rick Bradley. The short-lived project issued the Jack Endino engineered Live It While You Can EP on the Music For Nations label in 1988.

Pierce would form Nightshade with former Q5 bandmate Jonathan K. and sign with Music For Nations for the release of their 1991 Dead of Night album, while Sinsel ended up joining Stuverud's new band War Babies, which briefly featured a pre-Pearl Jam Jeff Ament on bass after the demise of Mother Love Bone. The group's self-titled album was released on Columbia Records in 1992 and contained the video singles "Hang Me Up" and "Blue Tomorrow".

In 1994, Sinsel, Brenner and Sheeley, 75% of the In Your Face line-up, played a TKO reunion show with Bobby Chouinard of Billy Squier fame on drums. Another reunion show took place in 1997, with a line-up composed of Sinsel, Sheeley, Rick Pierce, and Scott Graham on drums. An expanded version of TKO, starring Sinsel, guitarists Rick Pierce and Kjartan Kristoffersen, drummer Gary Thompson, and bassists Scott Earl and Evan Sheeley, performed at the opening ceremonies for the Experience Music Project in Seattle on September 28, 2001. Sinsel was also a member of the band 10 North at that time and had been writing with guitarist Brynn Arens of the band Flipp for a project later dubbed American Standard.

In 2009, American Standard issued the "Send Me An Angel" b/w "My Only Friend" 7" single on Rock Steady Records and digitally. Recording sessions had also involved TKO alumni Evan Sheeley and Michael Alex(ich) on bass and drums, respectively. Sinsel next turned up fronting The McClellans, a folk/Americana group celebrating "100 Years of Great American Songs" such as "You Are My Sunshine". Sinsel was seen tracking at Litho Studios in Seattle in 2011 with guitarist Mike McCready of Pearl Jam, former Screaming Trees drummer Mark Pickeral, bassist Keith Lowe, pianist Bart Roderick, and Jim Brunner on guitar, mandolin and dobro. The McClennans appeared at the Yakima Folklife Festival in 2012 and 2013. In addition, Sinsel would also gig with the Randy Oxford Band, an eclectic six-piece blues band.

In 2014, Sinsel emerged with a new rock project, Angels Of Dresden; a digital single, "Doomday", was released via Suna Sounds, in May of that year and featured a guest appearance by Mike McCready. It was followed by 4-song EP in November 2016. McCready also joined Sinsel and Rick Pierce for a performance of TKO's "Kill the Pain", during a benefit show at The Showbox in Seattle on May 16, 2014.

In 2013, original TKO rhythm section Mark Seidenverg and Darryl Siguenza reunited with their late 1960s rock/blues band The Blues Feedback celebrating their 45th anniversary.

Former TKO guitarist/keyboardist Tony Bortko died on December 4, 2006.

== CD re-issues ==
In 2000, East Coast based label Metal Mayhem Music, in conjunction with Adam 'Bomb' Brenner, issued "the unwatered down studio version of TKO's In Your Face" and packaged it with a 1981 live recording as In Your Face & Up Your Ass; the same company also issued Below The Belt on disc in 2001.

Let It Roll and In Your Face were finally re-issued on CD in 2008 via North Carolina's Divebomb Records with the full participation of Brad Sinsel. Both releases feature bonus tracks and liner notes written by noted Canadian writer Martin Popoff, editor-in-chief for Brave Words & Bloody Knuckles. The master tapes for Let It Roll were not available and both albums were re-mastered from a cleaned up LP. Bonus tracks on Let It Roll are taken from a tape of an in-studio live performance that was broadcast August 10, 1978 on Seattle rock radio station KZOK-FM. The bonus tracks on In Your Face consist of a 2001 remix by producer Rick Keefer of the original 1984 album.

Let It Roll, In Your Face and Below the Belt were all remastered and re-issued again by British label Rock Candy Records in October 2016.

== Recent vinyl releases ==
In July 2017, Pearl Jam guitarist Mike McCready, a long time fan of the band, released a red-vinyl 7-inch TKO single on his label, HockeyTalkter Records. The single features "My Memory" and "Not a Kid Anymore," two unreleased tracks recorded by the group's original Yakima line-up, consisting of Brad Sinsel, Rick Pierce, Tony Bortko, Evan Sheeley and Bill Durham.

The single was a teaser for the limited edition full-length vinyl-only release Round Two – The Lost Demos, issued by NW Metalworx Music in September 2017. The songs were recorded in the summer and fall of 1979 and intended for a second album with Infinity Records before the label folded.

== Discography ==
=== Albums ===
Title	Release	Label	AllMusic rating
Let It Roll	1979	Infinity	3/5 stars
In Your Face	1984	Combat	4/5 stars
Below the Belt	1986	Roadrunner	3/5 stars

=== Compilation albums ===
- US Metal Vol. IV (Shrapnel, 1984) "End of the Line"
- Welcome to the Metal Zone (Music For Nations, 1985) "Run Out of Town"
- Rock Classics: Rock the Night Volume 1 (Arcade, 1989) "Rock and Roll Remains"

=== CD re-issues ===
- In Your Face & Up Your Ass (Metal Mayhem, 2000)
- Below the Belt (Metal Mayhem, 2001; Rock Candy, 2016)
- Let It Roll (Divebomb, 2008; Rock Candy, 2016)
- In Your Face (Divebomb, 2008; Rock Candy, 2016)
