= Three Fish =

US musical group

- Three Fish in 1996, left to right: Jeff Ament, Robbi Robb and Richard Stuverud

Background information
- Genres: Alternative rock, post-grunge, world music
- Years active: 1994–1999
- Label: Epic
- Members: Jeff Ament; Robbi Robb; Richard Stuverud

Three Fish was an American rock band formed in 1994 by Pearl Jam's Jeff Ament. The lineup featured Ament, Robbi Robb of Tribe After Tribe, and Richard Stuverud of the Fastbacks and War Babies.

== History ==
The band was formed by bassist Jeff Ament and vocalist/guitarist Robbi Robb after the two had met when Tribe After Tribe opened for Pearl Jam in 1992 and 1993. The band was rounded out by drummer Richard Stuverud. Following the band's formation, Three Fish released its debut album, Three Fish, on June 11, 1996, through Epic Records. The album combined rock music with mystical-style Eastern music and received critical recognition. David Fricke of Rolling Stone said, "The whole thing is a weird mix – folky self-obsession, crackling pop, heavy, metallic sighing – but Three Fish is definitely worth, in the words of one song, 'a lovely meander.'"

The band reformed and on June 1, 1999, released its second album, The Quiet Table. Stephen Thomas Erlewine of Allmusic said that "while it can seem a little turgid at times, it's an ambitious project that often pays off in intriguing songs and evocative sonic textures." The band toured throughout 1999 in support of The Quiet Table.

== Band members ==
- Jeff Ament – bass
- Robbi Robb – vocals, guitar
- Richard Stuverud – drums

== Discography ==
=== Studio albums ===
Year	Album details
1996	Three Fish: Released: June 11, 1996; Label: Epic; Format: CD, LP
1999	The Quiet Table: Released: June 1, 1999; Label: Epic; Format: CD, LP

=== Singles ===
Year	Single	Album
1996	"Laced"	Three Fish

== See also ==
- List of alternative rock artists
