= Dry as a Bone =

EP by Green River
- Released: June 1987
- Recorded: July 1986
- Studio: Reciprocal Recording; Seattle, Washington
- Genre: Grunge
- Length: 19:24
- Label: Sub Pop
- Producer: Jeff Ament, Jack Endino

Green River chronology
Come On Down (1985)	Dry as a Bone (1987)	Rehab Doll (1988)

Alternative cover
- Back cover featuring the EP's title

Dry as a Bone is the second and final EP by the American rock band Green River. It was released in June 1987 through Sub Pop Records.

== Background ==
In June 1986, the band began production on its second EP with local producer Jack Endino at Reciprocal Recording in Seattle, Washington. Green River chose to record Dry as a Bone for Bruce Pavitt's new label, Sub Pop. The album's cover art was photographed by Charles Peterson. The song "Ozzie" was done originally by Tales of Terror.

== Composition ==
Dry as a Bone has frequently been cited as an early example of grunge, combining elements of punk and hard rock. Steve Kandell of Pitchfork characterized it as "faster, scrappier, punkier, and more lo-fi" than Rehab Doll (1988). AllMusic's Mark Deming noted that compared to Come On Down, Dry as a Bone sounded "tougher and livelier" and reflected a more refined balance of the group's influences. Several writers highlighted its fusion of styles. Rolling Stone wrote that while Come On Down was "crude and raw", Dry as a Bone presented a "seamless combination of punk and metal" in concise three- to four-minute tracks. Similarly, Nick Soulsby writing for PopMatters stated that its five songs showcased a merger of "muscular hard rock and ecstatic punk energy", while Steve Huey of AllMusic described the music as a perfected "sleazy, raucous fusion of '70s hard rock and post-hardcore punk". The EP's rawness has been repeatedly emphasized. Stephen Deusner in Uncut called it Green River's "most unhinged album", describing it as their "rawest" and possibly their funniest, and Punknews.org staff Johnathon1069 similarly stressed its "raw energy". He added that the recording, produced by Endino, felt spontaneous, "like the band got locked in a room … he hit record and they just saw what happened". He further compared its anger to Black Flag's My War (1984), though with songwriting closer to traditional rock and roll, and argued that it captured the "angst and boredom of being young" with intensity and passion.

Deming noted that the guitarist Bruce Fairweather, who replaced Steve Turner, proved a stronger fit for the band's metallic leanings on Dry as a Bone, with his and Stone Gossard's guitars gaining a "degree of bombast", while the bassist Jeff Ament and the drummer Alex Vincent provided a hard-hitting rhythm section. Jonathan1069 similarly described Gossard and Fairweather as playing "like men possessed", likening them to a punk rock version of Mick Ronson. With Fairweather on guitar, the vocalist Mark Arm was free to focus on what Laura Ansill of Treble called his "frantic, sleaze-ridden vocals", which Deming observed were better integrated into the arrangements than on the group's debut. Robert Allen of The Rocket compared his delivery to Henry Rollins, calling it an "overwhelming, screaming, growling expression of rage and angst". Treble described his vocals as "pure Iggy Pop", while Deusner wrote that Arm displayed a "bizarre charisma", singing as if he were "trying to out-Iggy the Stooges". Johnathon1069 described his style as "unbridled energy", full of screams and shouts, but also marked by vocal flares reminiscent of singers like David Lee Roth, Bret Michaels, or Vince Neil, though delivered in a way that felt authentic rather than staged.

"This Town"
"This Town" exemplifies the vocal style critics associated with Dry as a Bone, with Rolling Stone noting that Mark Arm was "shredding his vocal cords" in the song.

"Unwind" has often been singled out from the EP. Deusner described it as beginning with a "grimy blooz-rock strut" before the rhythm section shifts the pace, turning the groove inside out. Allen pointed to it as the clearest example of Arm's Henry Rollins–like delivery, calling it a bluesy number that escalates into thrash, culminating with Arm screaming, "I can get ya thinkin' anything I want." Ansill also highlighted the song for moving from bluesy beginnings into "nasty, driving chaos" that would help define the grunge sound. According to Treble, the music to "This Town" does not sound far removed from what Gossard and Ament would later write in Pearl Jam. Tim Stegall of Alternative Press compared the track to "Poison gone ballistic", while Rolling Stone noted its raw delivery, citing Arm's line, "I've been driven to the end of my rope." Spectrum Culture's John Paul identified "PCC" as an early example of Green River's proto-grunge sound, noting its rumbling bass and heavily distorted guitar squeals. "Ozzie" is a cover of "Ozzy" by the Sacramento hardcore band Tales of Terror, with Green River altering the lyrics and title. Paul described the band's rendition as "undeniable Sabbath worship filtered through a punk energy lens".

== Release and reception ==
Dry as a Bone was released in June 1987 as Green River's second EP on Sub Pop, making it the label's first non-compilation record. The EP's release was delayed for a year because Pavitt lacked the financial resources to press it immediately. It wasn't until 1987 when Jonathan Poneman invested in the label, motivated by a desire to release Soundgarden's music, that he and Pavitt combined their resources to fund Dry as a Bone. Arm remembered that at the time the goal was modest "if we could only get together $2,000, we could go make a record and press it up". In an early Sub Pop catalog, Pavitt described the EP as "ultra-loose GRUNGE that destroyed the morals of a generation", marking the first known use of the term to characterize Seattle's sludgy sound.

At the time of its release, Dry as a Bone gained local recognition. Allen wrote that while the EP would not unseat Green River as "the current kings of noise in Seattle", it reaffirmed their standing as the city's loudest and most prominent band. Looking back in 1990, Select critic Leo Finlay wrote that Dry as a Bone had been hailed as a "minor classic" in American underground circles when it was released. He emphasized that its importance was largely historical but noted that the EP had an effect on the wave of noise-oriented bands that followed. The same year, Dry as a Bone was reissued along with Rehab Doll as the Dry as a Bone/Rehab Doll compilation album.

== Legacy ==
Looking back, members of Green River have singled out Dry as a Bone as a defining release in the band's catalog. In a 2019 Rolling Stone retrospective, Ament described it as "the truest of all the records", attributing much of its character to the sessions at Reciprocal Recording with Endino. Gossard called it his favorite Green River release, recalling it as a time when the band was having the most fun and working in a less self-conscious way. Turner, who had left the group prior to the recording, also considered it their best record, noting that Fairweather proved to be the right fit on guitar. The EP also received praise from contemporaries. Soundgarden's guitarist Kim Thayil identified Dry as a Bone as his favorite Green River release and one of his favorite grunge records. He said that while Come On Down might have been "a little bit more grungy", it was less memorable than the songs on Dry as a Bone, and that Rehab Doll leaned toward a glam style he disliked.

=== Influence and retrospective assessments ===
Professional ratings
Review scores
Source	Rating
AllMusic	2.5/5 stars 3.5/5 stars
Pitchfork	7.8/10
PopMatters	8/10
Punknews.org	4/5 stars
Select	3/5 medals
Uncut	3.5/5 stars

Dry as a Bone has often been cited as a landmark in the development of grunge and Green River's best project. Rolling Stone ranked it number twenty on its list of the "50 Greatest Grunge Albums," while Revolver included it among "15 Essential Grunge Albums," and Alternative Press named it one of "10 Sub Pop Records releases that set the stage for modern grunge." Deusner argued that alongside Rehab Doll, it established the foundation of what became known as the Seattle sound, influencing bands from Nirvana to Alice in Chains. Phil Alexander of Kerrang! went further, calling it the record that "truly signifies the birth of grunge". Critics also continue to praise Dry as a Bone. Soulsby wrote that "The EP is a perfect summary of Green River's inherent strengths: a powerful and precise rhythm section, the catchy riffs, Mark Arm's signature bark 'n' whine already calling to mind Iggy Pop at his unhinged best." Johnathon1069 praised its brevity and consistency, saying all the tracks captured the band "in top form". Deming concluded that despite occasionally sounding forced, the EP remained an effective display of the group's "snarl and swagger" and a "solid calling card" to their talent.

== Track listing ==
All lyrics are written by Mark Arm; all music is composed by Jeff Ament, Bruce Fairweather, Stone Gossard, and Alex Vincent, except where noted.

No.	Title	Length
1.	"Unwind"	4:42
2.	"Baby Takes"	4:24
3.	"This Town"	3:23
4.	"P.C.C."	3:44
5.	"Ozzie" (Tales of Terror)	3:11
Total length:		19:24

== Personnel ==
- Jeff Ament – bass guitar, production, engineering
- Mark Arm – vocals
- Bruce Fairweather – guitar
- Stone Gossard – guitar
- Alex Vincent – drums
- Jack Endino – production, engineering
- Linda Owens – layout
- Charles Peterson – photography
