= Alex Vincent (drummer) =

American drummer

- Born: Alex Shumway; December 14, 1965 (age 60); Sacramento, CA, United States
- Genres: Punk; hardcore punk; hard rock; grunge
- Occupations: Musician; songwriter; actor
- Instruments: Drums; guitar; vocals
- Years active: 1982–present
- Labels: Stone Boat Records; Homestead Records; Sub Pop
- Formerly of: Thee Deception; Ex's With Benefits; Green River; Spluii Numa

Alex Shumway (born December 14, 1965), known professionally as Alex Vincent, is an American musician, songwriter, and actor who is best known as the drummer for the rock band Green River. Along with Mark Arm, Steve Turner, and Jeff Ament, he is one of its founding members. He is also the founder, drummer, and songwriter for the band Ex's With Benefits; as well as a founder and guitar player for the band Thee Deception.

== Biography ==
Vincent attended the Northwest School in Seattle, Washington with future bandmates Steve Turner and Stone Gossard (as well as future Presidents of the United States of America drummer, Jason Finn). He was the drummer for the band Spluii Numa and later pioneered the grunge scene as a founding member of Green River.

After the disbanding of Green River in 1988, he returned to college, eventually ending up in Japan as a student of international studies at Sophia University (上智大学) in Tokyo. He moved back to the United States in 1995 to work in politics and labor union-related organizations.

In 2012, he formed the punk band Ex's With Benefits with Dmitra Smith, Dave Place, and Pascal Faivre. In 2016, he formed Thee Deception with Dave Place, Samuel Bligh, Regan Hagar, and Cody Davis.

=== Green River ===
Vincent and Turner became acquainted with fellow Seattle musician Mark Arm while playing shows in and around Seattle in the early 1980s. In mid-1984, the three decided to form a band. They snapped up local bassist Jeff Ament after his band at the time, Deranged Diction, had broken up. The foursome called themselves Green River. Stone Gossard joined shortly thereafter. "We knew we wanted Ament," said Vincent. "Stone was in another band with Jonathan Evison called March of Crimes. [Stone] got fired from them and we picked him up just before we recorded the first demo." By the time the band finished the recording of its debut EP, Come on Down, Turner decided to leave the group, citing his distaste with Ament and Gossard's heavy metal leanings. Bruce Fairweather, Ament's former Deranged Diction bandmate, replaced Turner.

The band released the EP Come on Down in 1985 and followed it up with Dry As a Bone in 1987, the first release on Sub Pop records. The band's only full-length studio album, Rehab Doll, was released in 1988. In-fighting within the band lead to the group's break-up during the recording of Rehab Doll. A stylistic division had developed between Ament and Gossard on one side, and Arm on the other. Ament and Gossard wanted to pursue a major-label deal, while Arm wanted to remain independent, viewing the duo as being too careerist. The band achieved a considerable local reputation in Seattle and had a significant influence on the genre later known as grunge, with Green River being described as "arguably the first grunge band."

In 2008, Green River reunited for the 20-year anniversary of the Sub Pop record label and have played several live shows since.

=== Ex's With Benefits ===
Ex's With Benefits formed in 2012 after Vincent had written music for possible future recordings by Green River that never materialized. Not wanting the music to go to waste, he held on to it hoping to hear what it sounded like with vocals. He reconnected with an old high school friend, Dmitra Smith (who was fronting the San Francisco-based band Static People), sending her some of the songs to see if she'd be able to record on top of them. Almost immediately, it became a real collaboration. Soon after, Dmitra's husband, Pascal Faivre, joined on guitar with Dave Place on bass.

=== Big in Japan ===
In October 2010, Vincent played himself in the semi-documentary film, Big in Japan, directed by John Jeffcoat. It premiered in March 2014 at the South By Southwest Music and Film Festival.

== Personal life ==
Vincent currently lives in Seattle, Washington. Today, he is a stay-at-home father to his adopted daughters. He continues to compose and play music.

== Discography ==
=== Green River discography ===
Year	Title	Label
1985	Come on Down	Homestead
1986	Deep Six	C/Z
1987	Dry As a Bone	Sub Pop
1988	Motor City Madness	Glitterhouse
1988	Rehab Doll	Sub Pop
1988	Sub Pop 200	Sub Pop
1989	This House is Not a Motel	Glitterhouse
1989	Sub Pop Rock City	Glitterhouse
1989	Another Pyrrhic Victory: The Only Compilation of Dead Seattle God Bands	C/Z
1990	Endangered Species	Glitterhouse
1990	Dry As a Bone/Rehab Doll	Sub Pop
1992	Afternoon Delight: Love Songs from Sub Pop	Sub Pop
1996	Hype!: The Motion Picture Soundtrack	Sub Pop
2000	Wild and Wooly: The Northwest Rock Collection	Sub Pop
2006	Sleepless in Seattle: The Birth of Grunge	Livewire

=== Ex's With Benefits discography ===
Year	Title	Label
2015	Bad Hotel	Stone Boat Records

=== Thee Deception discography ===
Year	Title	Label
2019	CAPITAL	Stone Boat Records
2020	BATTLES	Waxon Records
