= Come On Down (EP) =

1985 extended play by Green River

EP by Green River
- Released: November 1985
- Recorded: December 1984
- Studio: Crow Studios, Seattle, Washington.
- Genre: Grunge
- Length: 27:46
- Language: English
- Label: Homestead
- Producer: Green River; Chris Hanzsek

Green River chronology
Come On Down (1985)	Dry as a Bone (1987)

Professional ratings
Review scores
Source	Rating
AllMusic	3.0/5 stars

Come On Down is the debut EP by the Seattle-based alternative rock band Green River. It was released in November 1985 through Homestead Records, while the band were on their first US tour. It is considered the first grunge record because it was released several months before the Deep Six album that included them as well as five other Seattle grunge bands.

== Overview ==
In the early 1980s, the Seattle branch of the indie movement was influenced by punk rock, however it removed its speed and its structure and added elements of metal. Although Malfunkshun and Soundgarden were more popular in Seattle at this time, Green River was the first band of this movement to release a recording. Come On Down has been described as a balance between punk and metal, being similar to a mashup of 1980s metal together with early Mudhoney, and with the sound being "dirty". In audio engineering, the term "dirty" or "fuzzy" describes "the opposite of clear, clean sound. A dirty tone would have some amount of noise, distortion, or overdrive in the signal."

This record also marks Green River's only record with original guitarist Steve Turner (later of Mudhoney), other than the 2016 LP release of 1984 Demos, and the 2019 release of Live At The Tropicana. Turner left the group due to his dissatisfaction with bassist Jeff Ament and guitarist Stone Gossard's heavy metal leanings. The record was released to little fanfare, and did not sell well. AllMusic reviewer Bradley Torreano describes the EP as "a worthwhile listen but not something that points towards the bright futures that its band members would enjoy." It contains the first recording of the song "Swallow My Pride", a song describing a lover's disdain for his girlfriend's feverish American patriotism, which was later re-recorded for the band's debut album, Rehab Doll.

In mid-1985, Green River embarked on its first nationwide tour to promote Come On Down. Release of the record was delayed however, thus negating the purpose of the tour. From all accounts the experience was less than positive, though it did help cement alliances with other emerging American indie rock bands such as Sonic Youth. In 1986, the band continued to play in and around the Pacific Northwest to steadily larger crowds (most notably in Seattle).

Leighton Beezer, who played with Mark Arm and Steve Turner in the Thrown Ups, states that when he first heard Green River play Come On Down, he realized that they were playing punk rock backwards. Additionally, he noted that the augmented fifth note was used by Black Sabbath to produce an ominous feeling but it is not used in punk rock. In the 1996 grunge film documentary Hype!, Beezer demonstrated on guitar the difference between punk and grunge. First he played the riff from "Rockaway Beach" by Ramones that ascends the neck of the guitar, then Come On Down by Green River that descends the neck. The two pieces are only a few notes apart but sound completely unalike. He took the same rhythm with the same chord, however descending the neck made it sound darker, and therefore grunge.

"Your Own Best Friend" (Demo) is a bonus track on the 2018 remaster.

The album’s title track discusses the Green River murders from the murderer’s point of view. The murderer, Gary Ridgway, is the second most prolific serial killer in the U.S., and is also a source behind the band's name.

== Track listing ==
All lyrics are written by Mark Arm; all music is composed by Jeff Ament and Stone Gossard, except where noted.

No.	Title	Music	Length
1.	"Come On Down"		3:23
2.	"New God"	Alex Vincent	4:29
3.	"Swallow My Pride"	Steve Turner	3:04
4.	"Ride of Your Life"		4:16
5.	"Corner of My Eye"		5:40
6.	"Tunnel of Love"	Ament	7:27
Total length:			27:43

== Personnel ==
Green River

- Jeff Ament – bass guitar, back and sleeve designs
- Mark Arm – vocals
- Stone Gossard – guitar
- Steve Turner – guitar
- Alex Vincent – drums

Production

- Green River – production, cover concept
- Chris Hanzsek – production, engineering
- Charles Peterson – photography, cover concept
- Paul Scoles – assistance

== Bibliography ==
- Anderson, Kyle (2007). Accidental Revolution: The Story of Grunge. Macmillan. ISBN 978-0-312-35819-8.
