= RNDM =

American alternative rock band

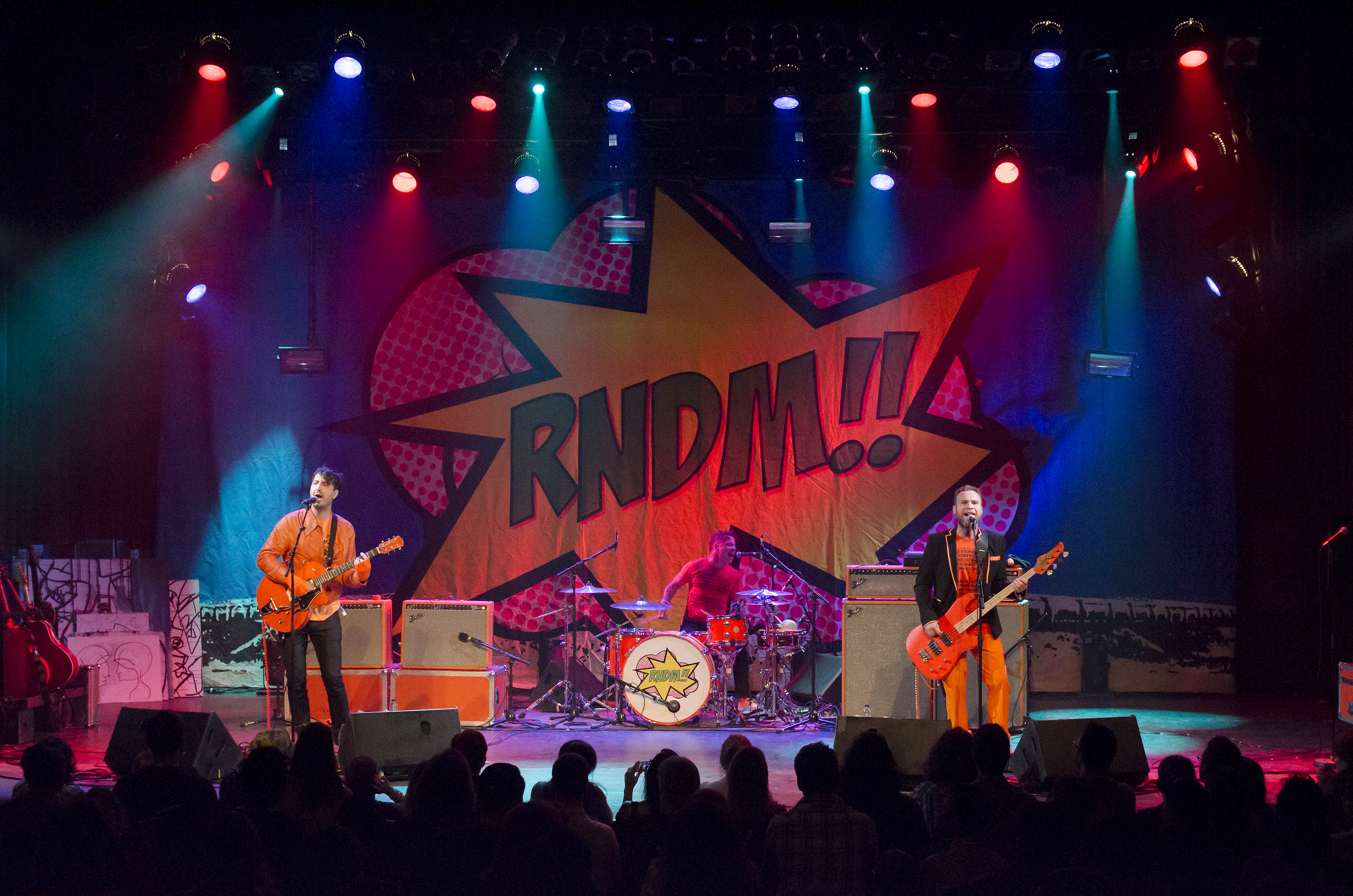
- RNDM in 2012

Background information
- Origin: United States
- Genres: Alternative rock
- Years active: 2012–present
- Labels: Dine Alone, Monkeywrench
- Members: Jeff Ament; Joseph Arthur; Richard Stuverud
- Website: http://rndmband.com/

RNDM is an American alternative rock band formed in 2012, consisting of Pearl Jam's bassist Jeff Ament, singer-songwriter Joseph Arthur and drummer Richard Stuverud. They released their first album, Acts, on 30 October 2012. Their second album, Ghost Riding, was released on March 4, 2016.

== Discography ==
- Acts (2012)
- Ghost Riding (2016)
