= Acts (album) =

Studio album by RNDM
- Released: October 30, 2012
- Genre: Hard rock Alternative rock
- Length: 45:08
- Label: Monkeywrench Records

RNDM chronology
Acts (2012)	Ghost Riding (2016)

Acts is the debut studio album by the American rock band RNDM.

== Reception ==
Professional ratings
Aggregate scores
Source	Rating
Metacritic	65/100
Review scores
Source	Rating
AllMusic	2.5/5 stars
Consequence of Sound	D
PopMatters	7/10 stars

Acts received mixed reviews from critics. On Metacritic, the album holds a score of 65/100 based on 4 reviews, indicating "generally favorable reviews".

== Track listing ==
1. Modern Times - 3:06
2. Darkness - 4:15
3. The Disappearing Ones - 3:08
4. What You Can't Control - 5:45
5. Hollow Girl - 5:37
6. Walking Through New York - 4:04
7. Look Out! - 2:53
8. New Tracks - 3:13
9. Throw You to the Pack - 1:41
10. Williamsburg - 4:14
11. Letting Go of Will - 2:35
12. Cherries in the Snow - 4:37

== Personnel ==
- Jeff Ament - bass
- Joseph Arthur - guitar, vocals
- Richard Stuverud - drums
