= Swallow My Pride =

Song by Green River

from the EP Come On Down
- Released: 1985
- Recorded: December 1984 (Come on Down version); August 1987 – January 1988 (Rehab Doll version)
- Studio: Crow Studios, Seattle Washington (Come on Down version); Reciprocal and Steve Lawson Studios, Seattle Washington (Rehab Doll version)
- Genre: Grunge
- Length: 3:04
- Label: Homestead (Come on Down version); Sub Pop (Rehab Doll version)
- Composer: Steve Turner
- Lyricist: Mark Arm
- Producers: Green River, Chris Hanzsek (Come on Down version); Bruce Calder (Rehab Doll version)

"Swallow My Pride" is a song by the Seattle, Washington-based rock band Green River. Featuring lyrics written by frontman Mark Arm and music written by guitarist Steve Turner, the song is the third track on the band's debut EP, Come On Down (1985). It was later re-recorded by Green River and appeared on the band's sole studio album, Rehab Doll (1988).

== Composition ==
"Swallow My Pride" features lyrics written by vocalist Mark Arm and music written by guitarist Steve Turner. The song's main guitar riff and two of its final verses were respectively copped from the opening riff and main chorus of Blue Öyster Cult's "This Ain't the Summer of Love" from the 1976 album, Agents of Fortune.

== Lyrics ==
"Swallow My Pride" describes a lover's disdain for his girlfriend's feverish American patriotism, characteristic of many so-called Reaganites during the time of the song's writing.

== Cover versions ==
Another Seattle rock band, Soundgarden, covered "Swallow My Pride" on the band's 1988 EP, Fopp. This version is performed with a predominantly punk-esque, simple chord style and does not include Blue Öyster Cult lyrics. Fellow Seattle rock band the Fastbacks covered this song for the 1988 compilation album, Sub Pop 200, an album that also featured Green River's song "Hangin' Tree". During a Pearl Jam concert in Las Vegas, Nevada on November 30, 1993, Jeff Ament and Stone Gossard of Pearl Jam (both previously in Green River) reunited with Turner and Arm of Mudhoney to cover the song. The performance was featured on Pearl Jam's 1995 fan club Christmas single.
