= White Light Motorcade =

New York City rock band

White Light Motorcade was a modern rock band from New York City. The band consisted of Harley Di Nardo (vocals, guitars), Mark Lewis (guitars), Steven Slingeneyer (drums), Tommy Salmorin (bass). In 2003, the band released their debut album, Thank You, Goodnight! On Octone / A&M Records, produced by Brad Jones. The album showed the band's 1960s garage rock and 1970s glam influences. Jones saw them at a NYC showcase and was impressed by the band's performance and song melodies and signed them.

In December 2003, the band created a video for "My Way", featuring Sophie Lovell Anderson and Huggy Leaver. Shandrach Lindo directed a video for the single "One In Three". Both videos featured the band's new drummer, Richard Stuverud.

Shortly after the release of Thank You, Goodnight! the band began touring with Ash, The Donnas, OK Go and were on the MTV2 / CMJ Advance Warning Tour.

== Albums ==
- Thank You, Goodnight! 2003 Octone Records
- Take me to your party 2005 Fatbone/Media Factory

== Thank You, Goodnight! tracklist ==
- Open Your Eyes
- It's Happening
- All Gone Again
- My Way
- Semi Precious
- Closest
- We Come Together
- Dream Dat
- I Could Kick Myself
- Useless
- Looking At Stars
- On Top

== Take Me To Your Party tracklist ==
- Take Me To Your Party
- Giant Hole
- One In Three
- What Are We Waiting For
- Sunshine In Your Eyes
- Worst Case Scenario
- Heard It All
- Let's Get Together
- Wish I Could Stop
- So Unsatisfied
- Beautiful Life
- Say Yes
- After Party
