= Green River (band) =

American rock band

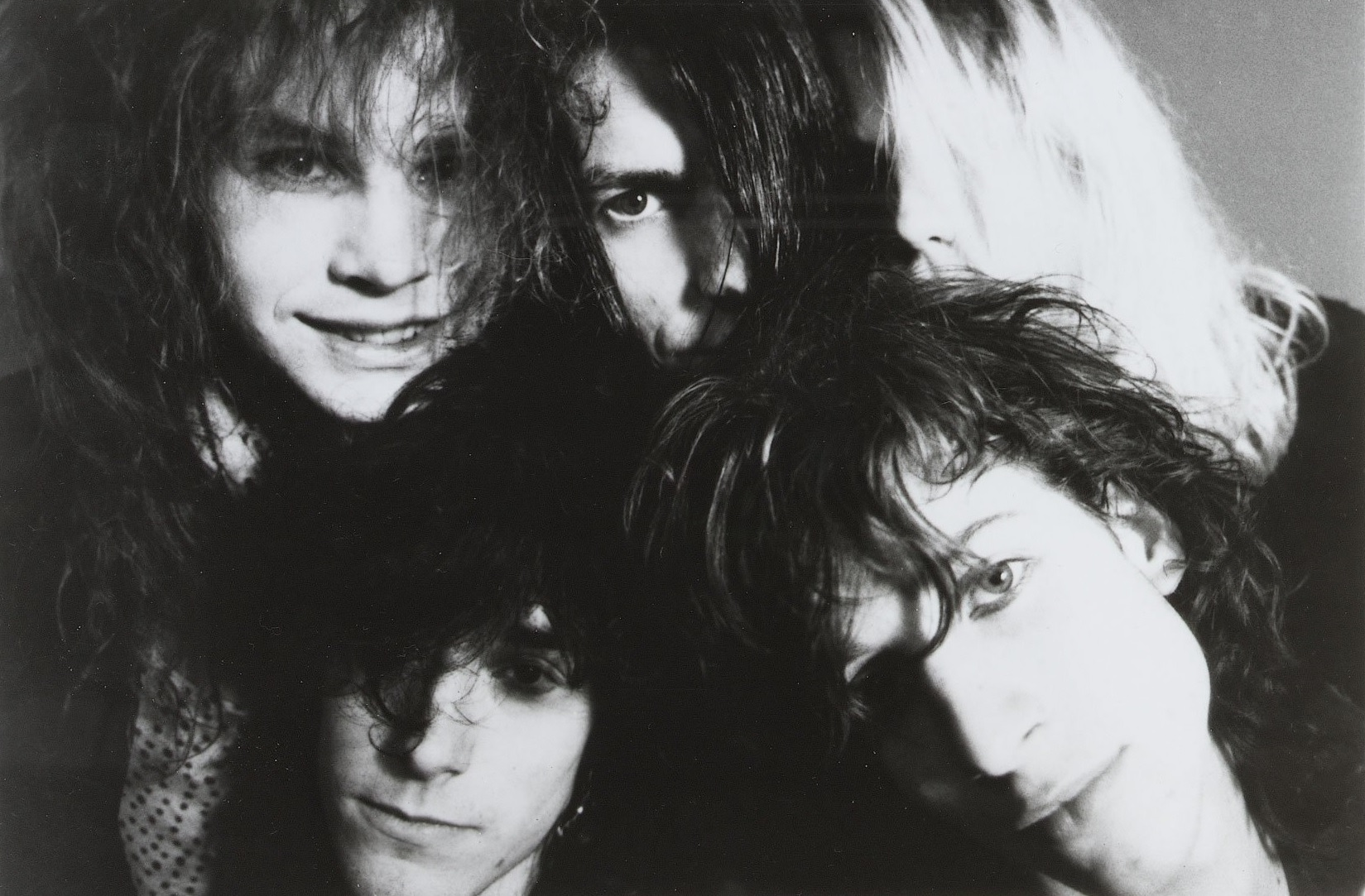
- Green River in the 1980s.

Background information
- Origin: Seattle, Washington, U.S.
- Genres: Grunge; punk rock; heavy metal; garage rock
- Years active: 1984–1988; 1993; 2008–2009
- Labels: Homestead, Sub Pop, C/Z
- Spinoffs: Mother Love Bone, Mudhoney, Love Battery, Pearl Jam, Temple of the Dog
- Past members: Jeff Ament; Mark Arm; Stone Gossard; Steve Turner; Alex Vincent; Bruce Fairweather

Green River was an American rock band formed in Seattle, Washington, in 1984. Considered one of the first grunge bands, Green River is best known for being the precursor to multiple key early 1990s rock bands, most notably Pearl Jam, Mudhoney, Mother Love Bone, Temple of the Dog, and Love Battery. Green River reunited for several live shows in 2008 and 2009.

== History ==
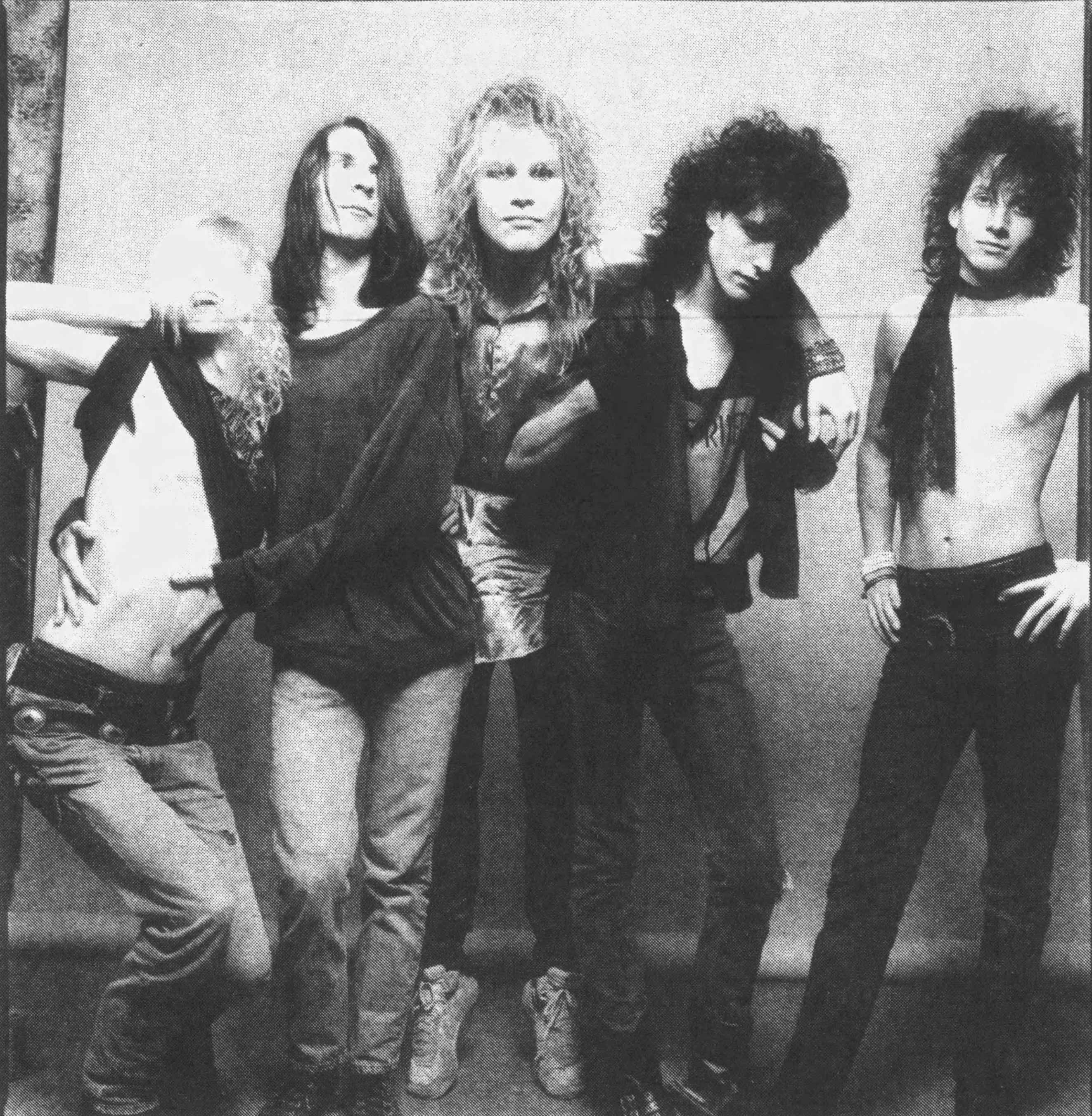
Green River in 1986. From left to right: Fairweather, Arm, Ament, Vincent, Gossard

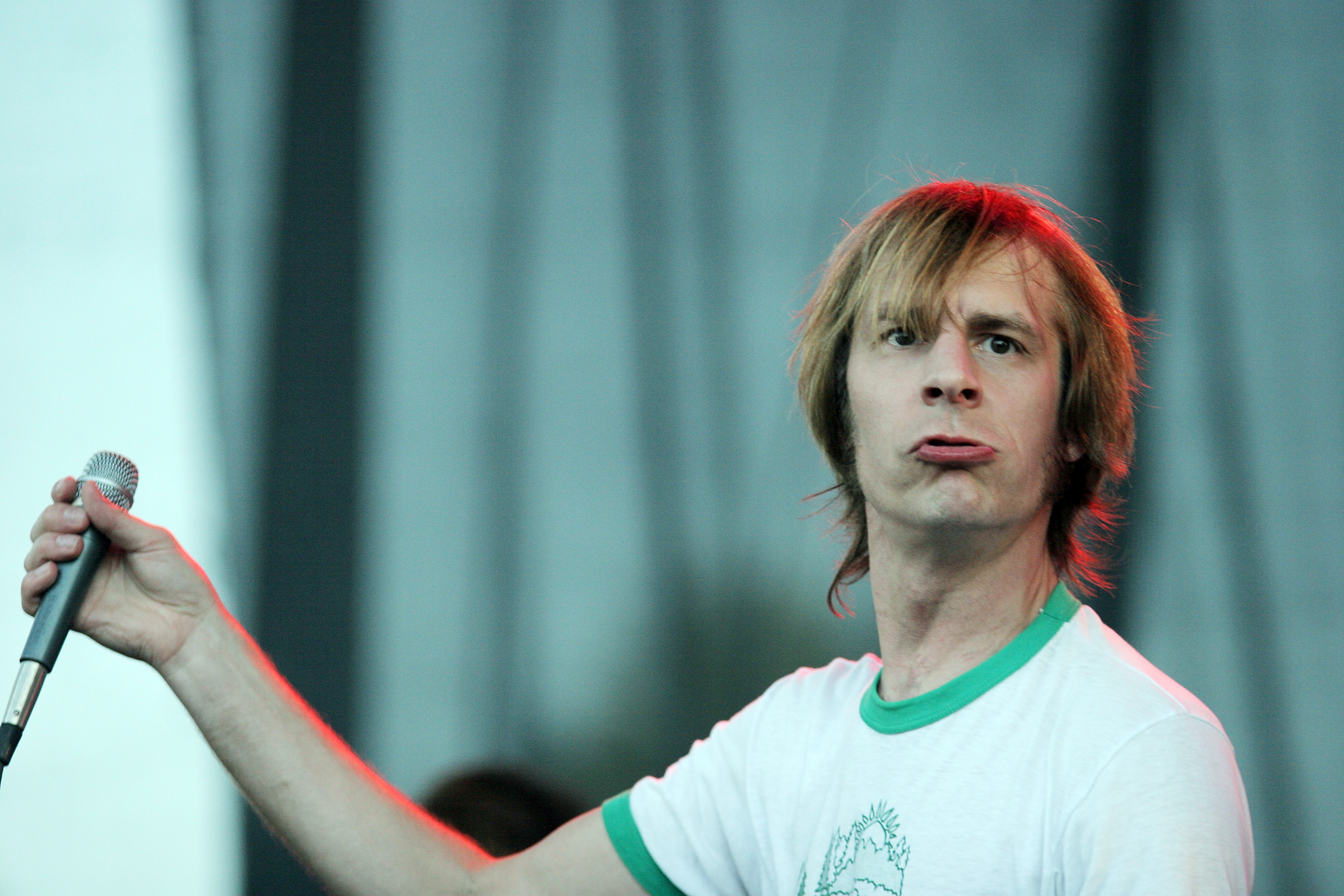
Mark Arm of Green River at their reunion concert in 2008 in Seattle.

In its first practice sessions in early 1984, Green River's members were vocalist Mark Arm, guitarist Steve Turner, drummer Alex Vincent (also known as Alex Shumway) and bassist Jeff Ament. Prior to joining Green River, they had played for a variety of rock, punk, and hardcore groups, often with overlapping lineups. Arm and Turner had played together in Mr. Epp and the Calculations and the Limp Richerds. Determined to start a new band together, they first recruited Vincent, whom Turner had briefly played with in Spluii Numa, as drummer, and then set about convincing Ament to join. He and Turner worked at the same Seattle coffeeshop, and Arm had befriended him after a DJ set by Ament at Metropolis, a local club. Ament had a low opinion of Mr. Epp, but agreed to join the new band due to Turner's persistence and Ament's frustration with Deranged Diction, his band at the time. The first Green River rehearsal was at the Turner home on Mercer Island. Stone Gossard, a high school friend of Turner and Vincent, joined as a second guitarist shortly thereafter.

The idea for the name "Green River" came to both Arm and Turner independently. Arm has cited several possible inspirations — a local community college, the 1969 Creedence Clearwater song — but the most resonant association was with the Green River Killer, an infamous Washington state serial killer who was prominent in headlines at the time. To Alice Wheeler, a band photographer, the name reflected undercurrents of depression and danger that would come to characterize grunge; Turner later came to see it as "a dumb joke."

On June 23, 1984, Green River recorded their first demos at Reciprocal Recording. They were released on vinyl in 2016. By late 1984, the band was playing shows in and around Seattle. The band began production in December 1984 on its first record, Come on Down.

By the time the band finished the record in mid-1985, Steve Turner had left the group. Turner has attributed this to his increased interest in 1960s garage rock, Billy Childish, and the Replacements, and dislike of the band's new more hard rock and heavy metal material. He was replaced by former Deranged Diction guitarist Bruce Fairweather.

In late 1985, the band embarked on its first nationwide tour to promote Come on Down. Release of the record was delayed, however, thus negating the purpose of the tour. From all accounts the experience was less than positive, though it helped cement alliances with other emerging American indie rock bands. Among them was Sonic Youth, who later quoted the song "Come on Down" on its own composition "Nevermind (What Was It Anyway)". After the tour, Come on Down was finally released by the New York-based Homestead Records. The record was released to little fanfare, and did not sell well. However it is often considered the first record to be released by a "grunge" band, as it predated both the Melvins debut EP and the Deep Six compilation album.

In 1986, the band continued to play in and around the Pacific Northwest to steadily larger crowds (especially in the band's hometown of Seattle). Early in the year, the now legendary Deep Six compilation album was released on the local C/Z Records label. Alongside two Green River songs, the compilation features the music of fellow Washington bands Malfunkshun, Melvins, Skin Yard, Soundgarden, and The U-Men. Kathleen C. Fennessy of AllMusic stated that the compilation "documents a formative period in Northwest rock history".

"This Town"
Sample of the 1986 Green River track "This Town" off Dry as a Bone. Characteristic of the band are heavy distortion and Arm's frenetic vocals.

In June 1986, the band began production on its second EP, Dry as a Bone, with local producer Jack Endino. Green River chose to record Dry as a Bone for Bruce Pavitt's new label, Sub Pop. However, Pavitt couldn't afford to release it until the following year, and, as had happened with Come on Down, the record was delayed. In the meantime the band issued the one-off "Together We'll Never" single on the local Tasque Force Records label. Dry as a Bone was finally released through Sub Pop in July 1987, a full year after it was recorded. It was the new label's first non-compilation release. Dry as a Bone was promoted by Sub Pop as "ultra-loose GRUNGE that destroyed the morals of a generation". Steve Huey of AllMusic called it Green River's "strongest individual release...perfecting their sleazy, raucous fusion of '70s hard rock and post-hardcore punk".

Almost immediately following the release of Dry as a Bone, the group re-entered the studio to begin production on its first full-length album, Rehab Doll. Band in-fighting, though, took center stage over the music. A stylistic division developed between Ament and Gossard on one side, and Arm on the other. Ament and Gossard wanted to pursue a major-label deal, while Arm wanted to remain independent, viewing the duo as being too careerist. The in-fighting came to a head following an October 1987 show in Los Angeles, California. Apparently, without informing the group, Ament had filled the show's guest list with major label representatives, instead of the band's friends; nonetheless only two of the representatives appeared. On October 31, 1987, Ament, Gossard and Fairweather stated their desire to quit the band. Although the band members agreed to complete production of Rehab Doll during the next three months, Green River had by late October 1987 ceased as a band. Rehab Doll was released in June 1988. Ned Raggett of AllMusic called it "a record that sounded caught somewhere between grunge mania and metal/corp rock folly".

=== Reunions ===
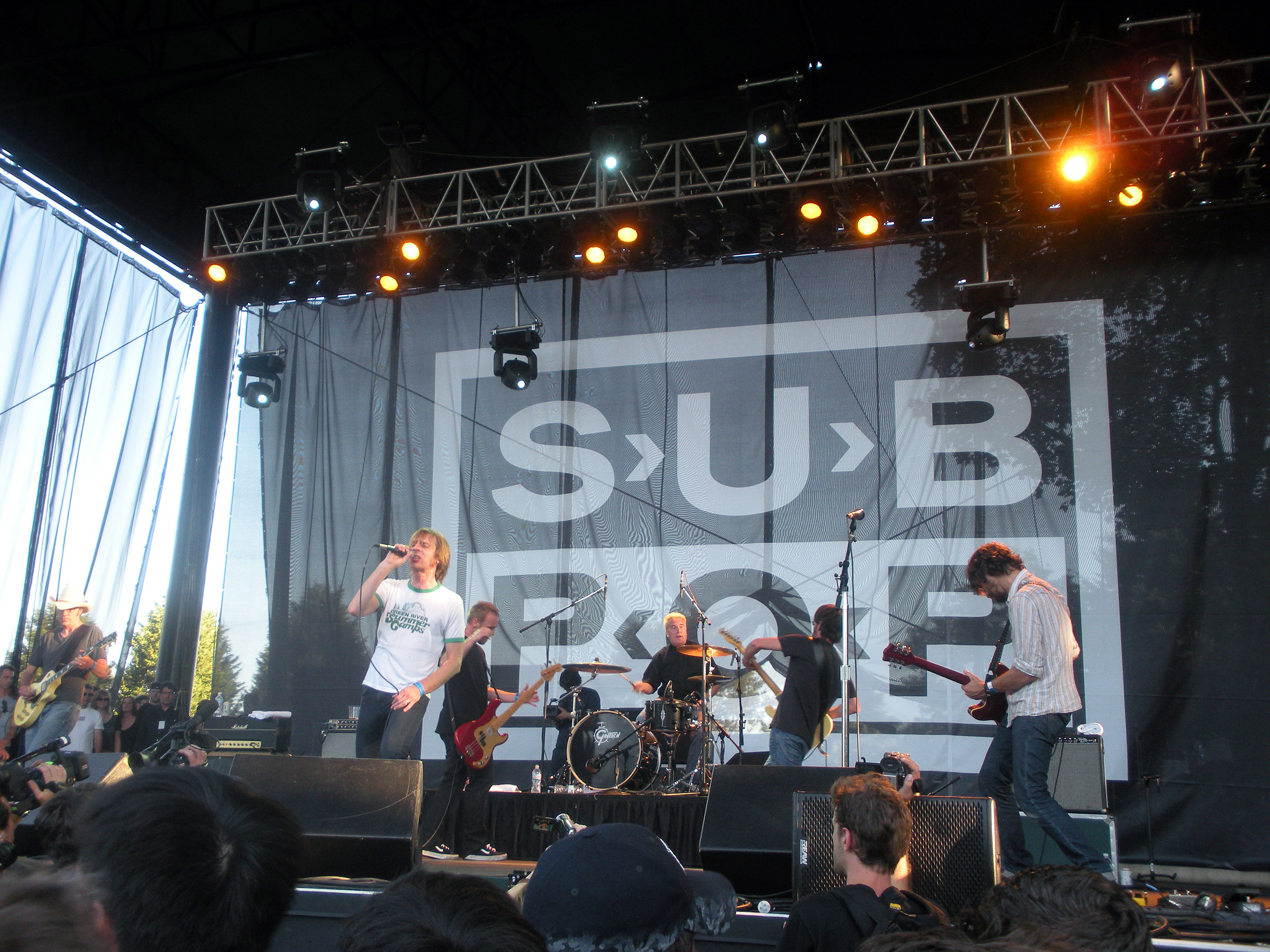
Green River reunites for a show at Sub Pop's 20th anniversary.

A Green River reunion occurred on November 30, 1993 during a Pearl Jam concert in Las Vegas, Nevada. Participating in the reunion were Arm, Turner, Gossard, Ament and Chuck Treece, who filled in on drums for Vincent, who at that time was living in Japan. The band performed the songs "Swallow My Pride" and "Ain't Nothing to Do." Green River reunited for four shows in 2008, featuring all six of its members from the 1980s. The first show was a warm-up show on July 10, 2008 at the Sunset Tavern in Seattle. The band next played on July 13, 2008 at Marymoor Park near Seattle to honor Sub Pop's 20th anniversary.

== Influences ==
They cited influences including the Stooges, the Melvins, Wipers, Black Sabbath, Led Zeppelin, Iggy Pop, the Sonics, the Birthday Party, Butthole Surfers, Scratch Acid, Big Boys, Really Red, Minor Threat, Dead Boys, New York Dolls, Aerosmith, Devo, the Clash, 999, Motörhead and Kiss.

== Band members ==
- Mark Arm – vocals (1984–1988, 1993, 2008–2009)
- Steve Turner – guitar, backing vocals (1984–1985, 1993, 2008–2009)
- Alex Vincent – drums, percussion (1984–1988, 2008–2009)
- Jeff Ament – bass, backing vocals (1984–1988, 1993, 2008–2009)
- Stone Gossard – guitar, backing vocals (1984–1988, 1993, 2008–2009)
- Bruce Fairweather – guitar, backing vocals (1985–1988, 2008–2009)

== Discography ==
=== Studio albums ===
Year	Album details
1988	Rehab Doll: Released: May 1, 1988; Label: Sub Pop (SP-15); Format: LP, Cassette

=== Live albums ===
Year	Album details
2019	Live at the Tropicana: Released: April 14, 2019; Label: Jackpot records; Format: LP

=== Demo albums ===
Year	Album details
2016	1984 Demos: Released: April 16, 2016; Label: Jackpot records; Format: LP

=== Compilations ===
Year	Album details
1990	Dry as a Bone/Rehab Doll: Released: September 13, 1990; Label: Sub Pop (SP-11b); Format: CD, cassette (CS)

=== Extended plays ===
Year	Album details
1985	Come On Down: Released: November 1985; Label: Homestead (031); Format: CD, LP, cassette (CS)
1987	Dry as a Bone: Released: July 1987; Label: Sub Pop (SP-11); Format: CD, LP

=== Singles ===
Year	Single	Album
1986	"Together We'll Never"/"Ain't Nothing to Do": Released: September 10, 1986; Label: Tasque Force (ICP-01); Format: 7"	Non-album single

=== Other appearances ===
Year	Song	Title	Label
1986	"10,000 Things" "Your Own Best Friend"	Deep Six	C/Z
1988	"Searchin' (Good Things Come)"	Motor City Madness	Glitterhouse
1988	"Hangin' Tree"	Sub Pop 200	Sub Pop
1989	"Bazaar" "Away in a Manger"	Another Pyrrhic Victory: The Only Compilation of Dead Seattle God Bands	C/Z
1990	"Ain't Nothing to Do"	Endangered Species	Glitterhouse
1996	"Swallow My Pride" (1987 demo)	Hype!: The Motion Picture Soundtrack	Sub Pop

== See also ==
- List of alternative rock artists
