= Limp Richerds =

- Origin: Seattle, Washington, United States
- Genres: Hardcore punk Noise rock Grunge
- Years active: 1981–1987
- Past members: Dave Middleton; Ross Maxwell Guffy; Charles Quain; Werner Cooke; Greg Billings; Scott Schickler; Mark Arm; Steve Turner

Limp Richerds were an American hardcore punk rock band from Federal Way, Washington which briefly featured Mark Arm and Steve Turner (later of Mudhoney and Green River) in one of their many lineups. They formed around 1981, but ceased to be a serious band in 1984, and finally split in 1987. The original lineup was Dave Middleton (vocals), Ross Guffy (percussion), Charles Quain (guitar), and Greg Billings (bass). The band was centered on the vocals and songwriting of Dave Middleton.

== Discography ==
- "Bob Hope's USO El Salvador Show 1983" on the Public Doesn't Exist cassette compilation
- "Death to Ivars" and "Non-Conformity Sox (live)" on the What Syndrome cassette compilation
- "My Dad Forgot His Rubber and I Was the Result" on the Sub Pop 9 cassette compilation
- split '7"' with A Rancid Vat (fake 7" single that came with a cassette of material by both bands)
