= Richard Stuverud =

American drummer (born 1969)

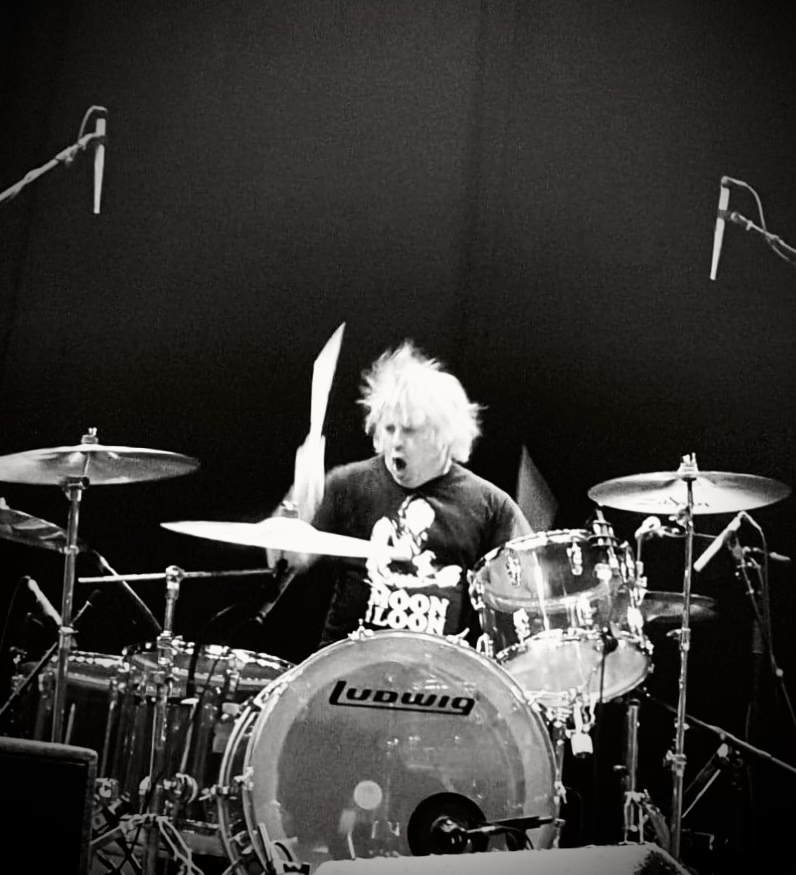
- Stuverud performing in 2022

Background information
- Born: September 26, 1969 (age 56)
- Origin: Seattle, Washington, U.S.
- Genres: Alternative rock; pop; pop rock; pop punk; Hard rock; heavy metal; World Music
- Occupations: Musician, composer, arranger, songwriter
- Instruments: Drums, percussion
- Years active: 1983–present

Richard Allen Stuverud Jr. (born September 26, 1969) is an American drummer from Seattle, Washington. He lives in Oakland, California, where he writes, arranges and produces songs. Stuverud played with Pearl Jam on several shows of the Gigaton Tour in May 2022, substituting for drummer Matt Cameron who had tested positive for COVID-19. Drumming duties during these shows were shared with Josh Klinghoffer.

== Career ==
His debut album, Memories in Kodachrome, was released in May 2020. The follow-up album, Hummingbirds was released in March, 2022. A 7" single, "Looking Back to Look Ahead", followed in March, 2023 featuring Jeff Ament on bass. The latest album, Sunset Ghosts (2024) was produced by Stuverud with additional production by Barrett Jones. Old and new friends and bandmates from Seattle and Oakland, including Ament, Kurt Bloch (Bad Scene), Tim Dijulio (Lazy Susan), and Sluggo Cawley (REQ'D, The Grannies), Neal Walter, Drew Gordon, Dave Flores, Jeff Rouse (Loaded), and Owen Adair Kelly appear.

Known for playing in several bands in the Seattle scene, his first was the punk rock band The Fastbacks. Through the mid-1990s, Stuverud played in the bands Three Fish and Tres Mts., both side projects of Pearl Jam bassist Jeff Ament. Three Fish released the albums Three Fish (1996) and The Quiet Table (1999), through Epic Records. The album Tres Mts. (Three Mountains), with Doug Pinnick of King's X and guest guitarist Mike McCready, was released in 2011. Pearl Jam's 2011 box set, Vitalogy, included the previously unreleased demo version of "Nothingman" with Stuverud on drums.

In 2012, he worked again with Jeff Ament, this time with the singer-songwriter, Joseph Arthur, to form the band, RNDM. They released their debut album, Acts (2012) and followed up with Ghost Riding (2016). Stuverud has collaborated with Ament on his solo albums, including I Should be Outside (2020), Tone (2008) and While my Heart Beats (2012). Stuverud is also on drums for Ament's third solo album, Heaven/Hell (2018).

A founding member of the Seattle band War Babies, Stuverud also played in Suicide Squad, the side project of Brad Sinsel of TKO, and for a short time, in the power metal band, Fifth Angel, appearing in the 1989 video for the song, "Time Will Tell". He played in several other bands in Seattle, including the cover band, Luv. Co (with Mother Love Bone and War Babies members) and Blind Horse, which featured Bruce Fairweather, ex-guitarist of Mother Love Bone and bass player in Love Battery. He later joined the Portland band, Pilot, which released the album, Stranger's Waltz, in 1998.

Stuverud has recorded and toured internationally with South African artist, Robbi Robb in Tribe After Tribe, Nash Kato of Urge Overkill, British artists Paul Newsome and Proud Mary, and New York City-based bands, White Light Motorcade and Queen V. His versatility on drums landed him national tours with Chicago blues man, Barkin' Bill Smith as well as Nashville's Gary Allan. Stuverud also continues to collaborate with Robbi Robb, contributing to the Tribe After Tribe albums, M.O.A.B. (2007) and Pearls Before Swine (1997) as well as Robb's 3rd Ear Experience albums, Stoned Gold (2017) and Stones of a Feather (2016). He plays drums in the Oakland-based bands, Slow Phase and REQ'D, and teaches drums, vocals and keyboards at the School of Rock in Berkeley.

== Discography ==
=== Solo ===
==== Singles ====
- Hardly Getting Over It (2025)
- When You Go (2025)
- Wait Up (2025)
- Used to Love the Rain (2025)
- The Last Song (2024)
- Longing for It (2023)
- After the Ruin (2023)
- Looking Back to Look Ahead (2023)
- This Big Love (2021)
- Empty Branches (2021)
- Nobody's Perfect (2021)
- Whole Wide World (2021)
- I'mSorryPleaseForgiveMeILoveyouThankYou (2020)
- Stargazers (2020)
- Not Afraid/Put your Guns Down Monkey Wrench Records (2017)

=== Albums ===
- Sunset Ghosts (2024)
- Hummingbirds (2022)
- Memories in Kodachrome (2020)
- The Richards (with Eric Richards) Dark Stuff Blues, Joshua Tree Records (2010)

==== with Al Bloch, Kurt Bloch ====
- Bad Scene No Threes Records (2026)

==== with Jeff Ament ====
- Heaven/Hell Monkey Wrench Records (2018)
- While My Heart Still Beats Monkey Wrench Records (2012)
- Tone Ten Club Records (2009)

==== Tres Mts ====
- Tres Mountains Monkey Wrench Records (2011)

==== RNDM ====
- Ghost Riding Dine Alone Records (2016)
- Acts, Monkey Wrench Records (2012)
- Modern Times Monkey Wrench Records (2012)

==== Three Fish ====
- Quiet Table Epic Records (1999)
- Three Fish Epic Records (1997)

==== with REQ'D ====
- Pulling Up Floorboards WonderTaker (2020)
- Fall in Love on Hate Street WonderTaker (2019)

==== with Slow Phase ====
- Slow Phase Fuzzy Mind Records (2020)

==== with Robbi Robb ====
- 3rd Ear Experience, Stoned Gold, (2017), Stones of a Feather (2016)
- Tribe after Tribe, m.o.a.b., Rodeostar Records (2008)
- Tribe after Tribe, Pearls before Swine, Intercord Records,(1997)

==== with Pilot ====
- Stranger's Waltz, Mercury Records (1997)
- When the Day has Broken TK Records (1996)

==== with War Babies ====
- VAULT, NW MetalWorx Music (2024)
- War Babies, Columbia Records (1992)

==== with The Fastbacks ====
- ...and his Orchestra PopLlama Records (1987)
- Everyday is Saturday No Threes (1985)
- Fastbacks Play Five of Their Favorites No Threes (1983)

=== on Drums ===
- Proud Mary, Dust and Diamonds (2009)
- Paul Newsome, Electric & Palms (2008)
- White Light Motorcade, Take Me to your Party, FabTone Records (2004)
- The Trouble with Sweeney, I Know you Destroy, Burnt Toast Vinyl (2003)
- Nash Kato, Debutante, Loose Groove Records (2000)
- The Returnables, The Returnables (1999)
- Lazy Susan, Sink, Warner Chapel Music (1995)
- Suicide Squad, Suicide Squad, Music for Nations (1987)
- The Bombardiers, Fight Back Green Monkey Records (1985), Search and Enjoy Option to Burn Records (1984)
