= Blue Mountain (Montana) =

Mountain in Montana, United States

Coordinates: 46°48′57″N 114°11′10″W

Blue Mountain is the western landmark of the city of Missoula and is a popular recreational destination for disc golf, hiking, mountain biking, off-road motorcycling, horse riding, shooting and hunting. In the past it was used as a military training site.

== History ==
Military use

Beginning in 1942 and ending in 1992 Blue Mountain was used as a training site for the Regular Army, Army National Guard, and Army Reserve. It was used for small arms live firing, land navigation training, and practice artillery training. In 2008 an unexploded ordnance survey was completed and found no UXO.

== Structures ==
The University of Montana Department of Physics and Astronomy maintains an observatory at the peak.

A fire lookout tower also exists at the peak.

== Notable features ==
Blue Mountain has a system of nature trails and old logging roads that cut across large portions of the mountain, an abandoned apple orchard, and the remains of some old, small, gravel pits on the back side that are part of the Blue Mountain Recreation Area. There's also an OHV trail head that allows motorcycles and other off-road vehicles access to trails on Blue Mountain.

== Flora and fauna ==
Mule deer, coyotes, black bear, grouse, wild turkeys and other wild animals can be found without much effort across the entire mountain. The black bears are typically found foraging for apples in the abandoned orchard in the fall getting fat for the winter.
