= Jeff Ament =

American bassist (born 1963)

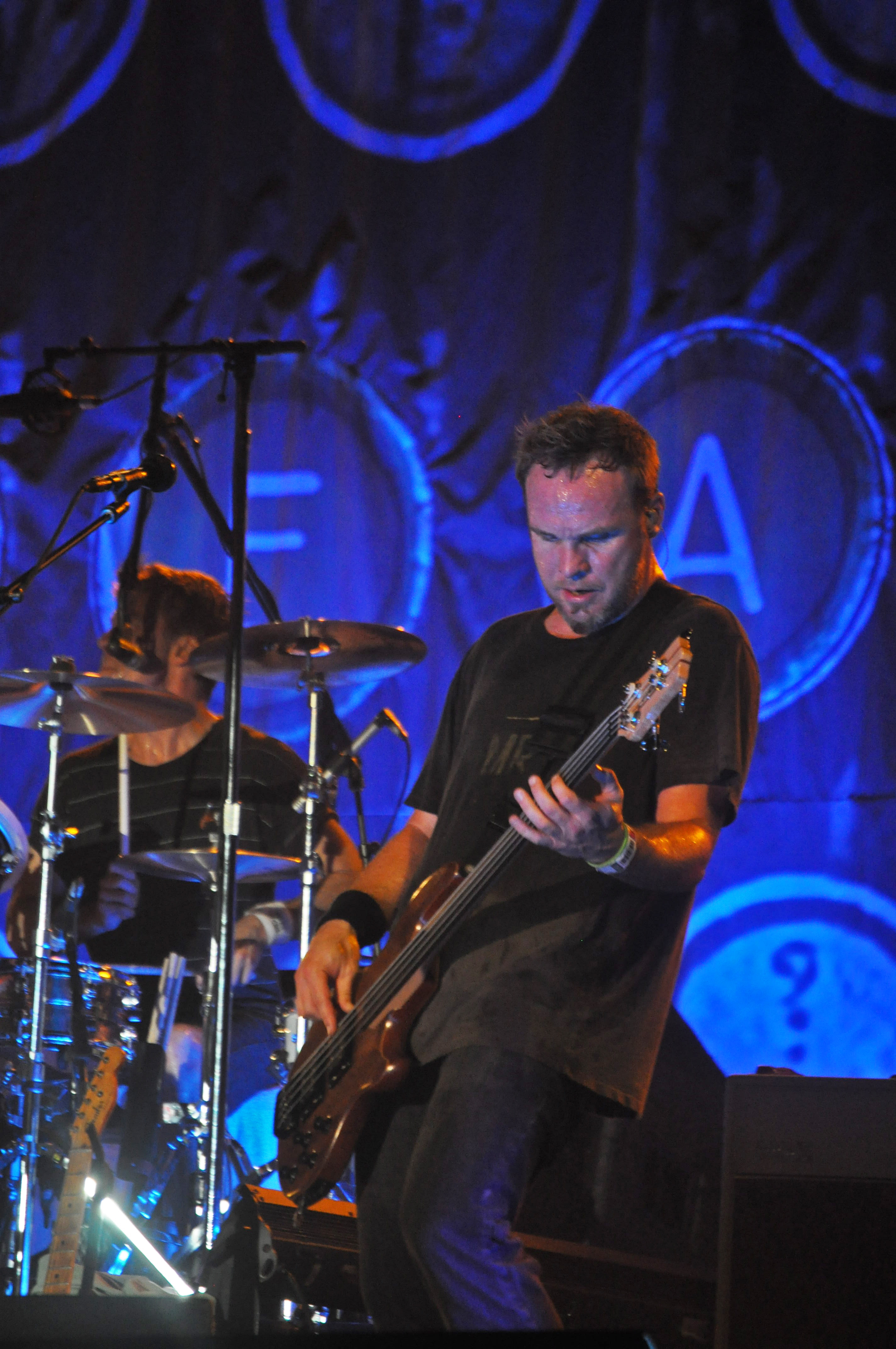
- Ament performing with Pearl Jam in 2009

Background information
- Also known as: Al Nostreet, Jeff Diction
- Born: Jeffrey Allen Ament; March 10, 1963 (age 63); Havre, Montana, U.S.
- Origin: Big Sandy, Montana, U.S.
- Genres: Alternative rock; grunge; hardcore punk; hard rock; heavy metal; experimental rock; glam metal
- Occupations: Musician; songwriter
- Instruments: Bass guitar; double bass
- Years active: 1981–present
- Labels: Monkeywrench; Homestead; Sub Pop; Stardog; Mercury; A&M; Epic; J
- Member of: Pearl Jam • RNDM
- Formerly of: Green River • Mother Love Bone • Three Fish • Temple of the Dog • War Babies • Deaf Charlie • Tres Mts. • Deranged Diction

Signature
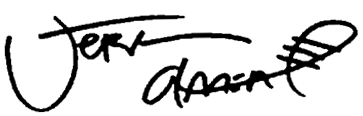

Jeffrey Allen Ament (born March 10, 1963) is an American musician best known as the bassist of rock band Pearl Jam, which he co-founded alongside Stone Gossard, Mike McCready, and Eddie Vedder. Ament wrote or co-wrote many of Pearl Jam's hits, including "Jeremy", "Oceans", "Dissident", "Nothingman" and "Nothing as It Seems".

Prior to his work with Pearl Jam, Ament was part of the 1980s Seattle-based grunge rock bands Green River, Mother Love Bone, Temple of the Dog and Three Fish. He is known particularly for playing with the fretless bass, upright bass, and twelve-string bass guitars. Ament is also a member of the band RNDM.

In 2008, Ament released his first solo album Tone. His second solo release, While My Heart Beats, followed in 2012, and his third in 2018: Heaven/Hell. Ament was inducted into the Rock and Roll Hall of Fame as a member of Pearl Jam on April 7, 2017. He was also recognized as one of the top hard rock and metal bassists of all time by Loudwire in 2016, placing at #52 on the list.

== Biography ==
=== Early life ===
The first of 12 children, Ament was born in Havre, Montana, to George and Penny Ament and grew up in the town of Big Sandy, Montana, a town with a population of less than 700 people. Ament's father George was mayor of Big Sandy for fifteen years, as well as a barber and a school bus driver. Ament described his family growing up as "pretty poor" and "hard-core Catholic."

He began playing the bass guitar as a teenager, often playing along with Ramones, The Clash, and The Police records. Ament participated in basketball, football, and track at Big Sandy High School, where he graduated in 1981. He then attended the University of Montana in Missoula, Montana, where he studied art and played basketball. Ament quit college in the middle of his second year after the university told him they were no longer going to continue its graphic design program. In 1983, Ament relocated to Seattle, Washington with his band Deranged Diction. While in Seattle, Ament got a job working at a coffee shop in Belltown.

=== Green River ===
Ament became acquainted with fellow Seattle musicians Mark Arm and Steve Turner, and he was asked to join their new band Green River in 1984. The band also included drummer Alex Vincent, with guitarist Stone Gossard eventually being added to the line-up. By the time the band finished the recording of its debut EP, Come on Down, Turner decided to leave the group, citing his distaste with Ament and Gossard's heavy metal leanings. He was replaced by Ament's former Deranged Diction bandmate, Bruce Fairweather.

The band released the EP Come on Down in 1985 and followed it up with Dry As a Bone in 1987, the first non-compilation release on Sub Pop records. The band's only full-length studio album, Rehab Doll, was released in 1988. In-fighting lead to the group's break-up during the recording of Rehab Doll. A stylistic division had developed between Ament and Gossard on one side, and Arm on the other. Ament and Gossard wanted to pursue a major-label deal, while Arm wanted to remain independent, viewing the duo as being too careerist. Regarding the accusation, Ament later said that during his time with the band he had to work at a restaurant in order to pay his rent, while the other members were supported by their parents. He said, "Did I want to play music and have my rent paid for? Hell yeah." The band achieved a considerable local reputation in Seattle and had a significant influence on the genre later known as grunge, with Green River being described as "arguably the first grunge band."

=== Mother Love Bone ===
Following Green River's dissolution, Ament established Mother Love Bone in 1988 along with former Green River members Gossard and Fairweather, former Malfunkshun frontman Andrew Wood, and former Ten Minute Warning and Skin Yard drummer Greg Gilmore. The band quickly worked on recording and performing locally and by late 1988 had become one of Seattle's more promising bands. In early 1989 the band signed to PolyGram subsidiary Mercury Records. In March of that year the group issued its debut EP, Shine.

In late 1989 the group returned to the studio to record its debut studio album, Apple. It was planned for a March 1990 release. Only days before the release of Apple, however, frontman Wood, who had a long history with drug problems, overdosed on heroin. After spending a few days in the hospital in a coma, Wood died, effectively bringing Mother Love Bone to an end. Apple was released later that year.

=== Temple of the Dog ===
Following Wood's death, Ament and Gossard almost parted company. Ament briefly spent time in the band War Babies, but he eventually got back together with Gossard and a childhood friend of Gossard's named Mike McCready. The trio were attempting to form their own band when they were invited to be part of the Temple of the Dog project founded by Soundgarden's Chris Cornell as a musical tribute to Andrew Wood. Cornell had been Wood's roommate. Ament described the collaboration as "a really good thing at the time" for him and Gossard that put them into a "band situation where we could play and make music." The band's lineup was completed by the addition of Soundgarden drummer Matt Cameron.

The band started rehearsing songs that Cornell had written on tour prior to Wood's death, as well as re-working some existing material from demos written by Gossard and Ament. This project eventually featured vocalist Eddie Vedder, who had arrived in Seattle to audition to be the singer for Ament and Gossard's next band, which later became Pearl Jam. Vedder sang a duet with Cornell on the song "Hunger Strike" and provided background vocals on several other songs. The band decided that it had enough material for an entire album and, in April 1991, Temple of the Dog was released through A&M Records.

=== Pearl Jam ===
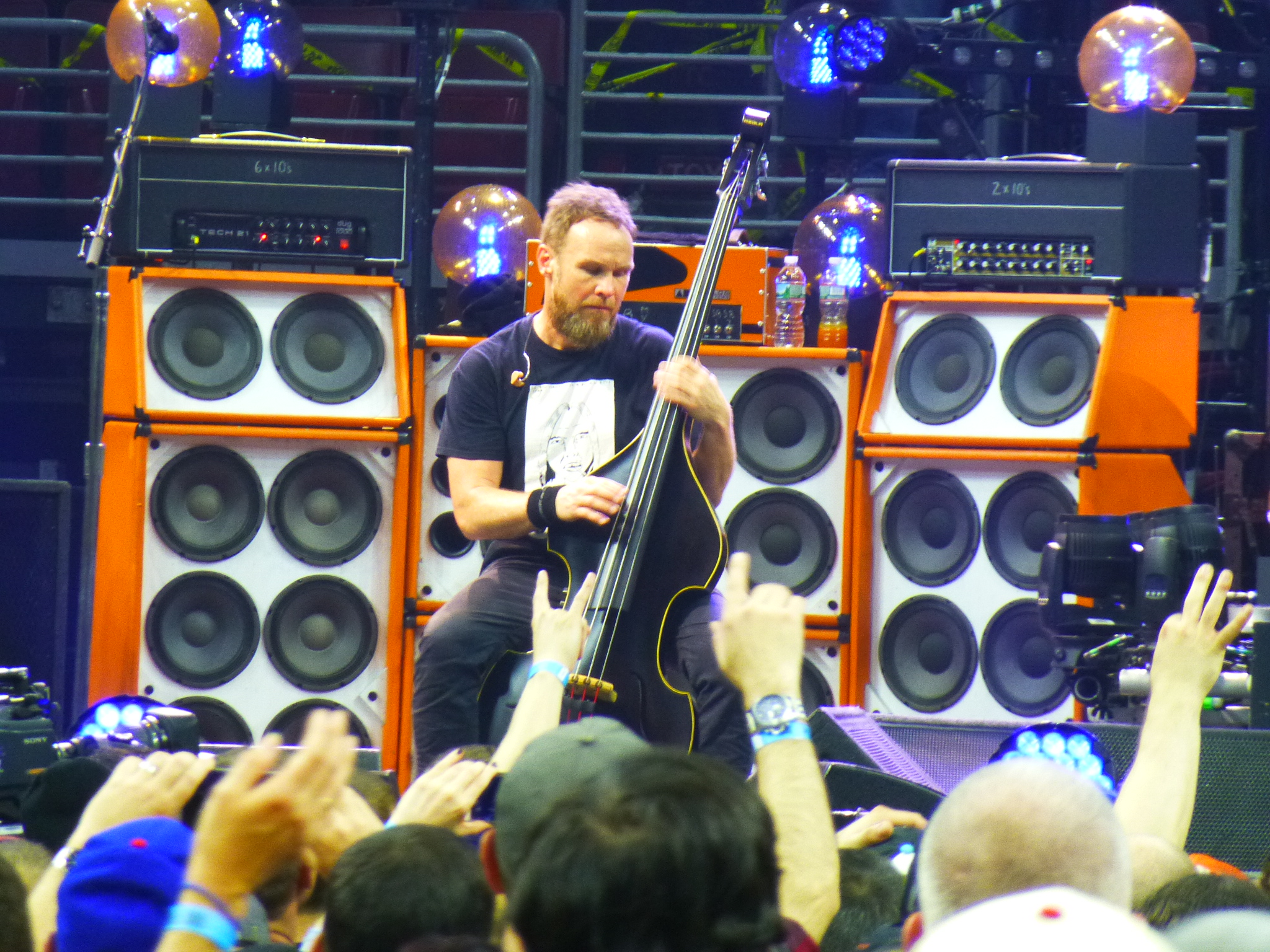
Ament performing with Pearl Jam show at the Wells Fargo Center in Philadelphia in April 2016

Pearl Jam was formed in 1990 by Ament, Gossard, and McCready, who then recruited Vedder and drummer Dave Krusen. The band originally took the name Mookie Blaylock, but was forced to change it when the band signed to Epic Records in 1991. After the recording sessions for Ten were completed, Krusen left Pearl Jam in May 1991. Krusen was replaced by Matt Chamberlain, who had previously played with Edie Brickell & New Bohemians. After playing only a handful of shows, one of which was filmed for the "Alive" video, Chamberlain left to join the Saturday Night Live band. As his replacement, Chamberlain suggested Dave Abbruzzese, who joined the group and played the rest of Pearl Jam's live shows supporting the Ten album.

Ten broke the band into the mainstream, and became one of the best selling alternative albums of the 1990s. The band found itself amidst the sudden popularity and attention given to the Seattle music scene and the genre known as grunge. The single "Jeremy" received Grammy Award nominations for Best Rock Song and Best Hard Rock Performance in 1993. Pearl Jam received four awards at the 1993 MTV Video Music Awards for its music video for "Jeremy", including Video of the Year and Best Group Video. Ten was ranked number 207 on Rolling Stone magazine's list of the 500 greatest albums of all time, and "Jeremy" was ranked number 11 on VH1's list of the 100 greatest songs of the '90s.

Following an intense touring schedule, the band went into the studio to record what would become its second studio album, Vs., released in 1993. Upon its release, Vs. set at the time the record for most copies of an album sold in a week, and spent five weeks at number one on the Billboard 200. Vs. was nominated for a Grammy Award for Best Rock Album in 1995. From Vs., the song "Daughter" received a Grammy nomination for Best Rock Performance by a Duo or Group with Vocal and the song "Go" received a Grammy nomination for Best Hard Rock Performance.

Feeling the pressures of success, the band decided to decrease the level of promotion for its albums, including refusing to release music videos. "Ten years from now," Ament said, "I don't want people to remember our songs as videos." In 1994, the band began a much-publicized boycott of Ticketmaster, which lasted for three years and limited the band's ability to tour in the United States. Ament took an active role during Pearl Jam's dispute with Ticketmaster in 1994 over prices and surcharges. Along with Gossard, Ament testified before a congressional subcommittee, arguing that Ticketmaster's practices were anti-competitive.

Later that same year the band released its third studio album, Vitalogy, which became the band's third straight album to reach multi-platinum status. The album received Grammy nominations for Album of the Year and Best Rock Album in 1996. Vitalogy was ranked number 492 on Rolling Stone magazine's list of the 500 greatest albums of all time. The lead single "Spin the Black Circle" won a Grammy Award in 1996 for Best Hard Rock Performance. Although Abbruzzese performed on the album Vitalogy, he was fired in August 1994, four months before the album was released. The band cited political differences between Abbruzzese and the other members; for example, he disagreed with the Ticketmaster boycott. He was replaced by Jack Irons, a close friend of Vedder and the former and original drummer of the Red Hot Chili Peppers.

The band subsequently released No Code in 1996 and Yield in 1998. In 1998, prior to Pearl Jam's U.S. Yield Tour, Irons left the band due to dissatisfaction with touring. Pearl Jam enlisted former Soundgarden drummer Matt Cameron as Irons' replacement on an initially temporary basis, but he soon became a permanent replacement for Irons. "Do the Evolution" (from Yield) received a Grammy nomination for Best Hard Rock Performance. In 1998, Pearl Jam recorded "Last Kiss", a cover of a 1960s ballad made famous by J. Frank Wilson and the Cavaliers. It was released on the band's 1998 fan club Christmas single; however, by popular demand, the cover was released to the public as a single in 1999. "Last Kiss" peaked at number two on the Billboard charts and became the band's highest-charting single.

In 2000, the band released its sixth studio album, Binaural, and initiated a successful and ongoing series of official bootlegs. The band released seventy-two such live albums in 2000 and 2001, and set a record for most albums to debut in the Billboard 200 at the same time. "Grievance" (from Binaural) received a Grammy nomination for Best Hard Rock Performance. The band released its seventh studio album, Riot Act, in 2002. Pearl Jam's contribution to the 2003 film, Big Fish, "Man of the Hour", was nominated for a Golden Globe Award in 2004. The band's eighth studio album, the eponymous Pearl Jam, was released in 2006. The band released its ninth studio album, Backspacer, in 2009 its tenth studio album, Lightning Bolt, in 2013 and its eleventh studio album Gigaton in 2020.

Aside from his musical contributions for the band, Ament has made significant contributions to the band's album artwork. His photography can be found throughout the majority of the band's releases. He has won two Grammy Awards for Best Recording Package for his work on the album Lightning Bolt and on Chris Cornell's self-titled compilation.

== Other musical projects ==
=== Three Fish ===
Ament had a side project band named Three Fish, which he formed in 1994 with Robbi Robb of Tribe After Tribe and Richard Stuverud of the Fastbacks. Three Fish released two albums, Three Fish (1996) and The Quiet Table (1999).

=== Mirror Ball ===
Ament performed with other members of Pearl Jam on Neil Young's 1995 album, Mirror Ball, and subsequently took part in an eleven-date tour in Europe as part of Young's backing band. This tour proved very successful with Young's manager Elliot Roberts calling it "One of the greatest tours we ever had in our whole lives."

=== Tone ===
On September 16, 2008, Ament released his first solo album, Tone, through Monkeywrench Records. The album features ten songs written over a span of 12 years. The album's songs feature a raw, experimental sound. 3,000 copies of Tone were pressed and were distributed through independent record stores across the United States as well as through Pearl Jam's official website. The album, like their others is also available via Pearl Jam's official website.

=== Tres Mts. ===
On January 24, 2011 Ament announced on Pearl Jam's official website his side project with dUg Pinnick of King's X and Richard Stuverud of the Fastbacks. The band's official Facebook page announced a March 2011 release of their album, Three Mountains, through Monkeywrench Records.

=== RNDM ===
In 2012, Ament started another band with singer-songwriter Joseph Arthur and drummer Richard Stuverud.

== Other work ==
Ament had a brief acting cameo in the 1992 movie, Singles, along with Stone Gossard and Eddie Vedder of Pearl Jam. He appeared as himself, playing bass in lead actor Matt Dillon's backing band, Citizen Dick. Most of Matt Dillon's wardrobe in the movie actually belonged to Ament. During the making of the film Ament produced a list of song titles for the fictional band. Chris Cornell took it as a challenge to write songs for the film using those titles, and "Spoonman" was one of them. The title of "Spoonman" is credited to Ament in the liner notes for Soundgarden's 1994 album, Superunknown.

With his brother Barry, Ament founded Ames Bros., an art production company that produces tour posters and album artwork for many bands, including Pearl Jam. The brothers won a Grammy Award in 2020 for "Best Recording Package" as a result of their work as art directors on the Chris Cornell posthumous compilation album titled Chris Cornell.

In 2022 Ament scored, together with Josh Klinghoffer, the FX on Hulu television series Under the Banner of Heaven, adaptation of Jon Krakauer’s best-selling book.

== Musical style and influences ==
Ament has cited the Who, Ramones, the Clash, Led Zeppelin, and Neil Young as his biggest musical influences. In an interview, Ament stated:

I have to be able to feel the bass. I've worked hard with our producers to make sure that when you play our records on your stereo, you can feel the bass. You might not necessarily be able to hear it all the time, but if you turn it up you can feel the movement in the low end—that it's moving the song. And when it's not there, it should be creating a dynamic.

Ament makes a major songwriting contribution to Pearl Jam. He wrote the music for one of the band's biggest hits, "Jeremy", as well as "Nothingman" (from Vitalogy). His contributions to Pearl Jam's songs have not been limited to music with Ament having written the lyrics for the Yield songs "Pilate" and "Low Light", the Binaural songs "Gods' Dice" and "Nothing as It Seems", "Help Help" (from Riot Act), "Other Side" (from the "Save You" single), and "Sweet Lew" (from Lost Dogs). As well as bass contributions, Ament has often provided backing vocals and has played guitar on two of the Pearl Jam songs he had written musically: "Smile" (from No Code) and "Bee Girl" (from Lost Dogs). He performs lead vocal duties on "Sweet Lew" and also on the Ramones cover "I Just Want To Have Something To Do". He plays guitar and keyboard on Dance of the Clairvoyants (from Gigaton).

In 2011, Ament endorsed luthier Mike Lull, and a signature model was produced, which is available in four different colors.

== Personal life ==
Ament is a fan of the former Seattle SuperSonics NBA basketball team, and for 10 consecutive years he held season tickets to the team at Key Arena. He also plays basketball, and he suggested NBA player Mookie Blaylock as the name of the band that is now Pearl Jam.

Ament is also an avid reader and has cited Mikhail Bulgakov and Cormac McCarthy as his favorite authors. On February 16, 2016, he married longtime partner Pandora Andre-Beatty.

Ament currently lives in Seattle, Washington and Missoula, Montana. Aside from music, Ament's interests include skateboarding, basketball, graphic design, snowboarding, and wakeboarding. Ament assisted in financing the construction of Missoula's Mobash Skatepark. In 2004, Ament and his wife Pandora Andre-Beatty climbed Africa's Mount Kilimanjaro in support of Save the Children. Since 2014, Ament and Andre-Beatty have funded and operated the Montana Pool Service Foundation, a registered 501(c)3. Ament and Montana Pool Service have helped build over 30 skate parks in the state of Montana, including many on Native American reservations.

Ament is a supporter of organic farming and former United States Senator Jon Tester. Tester grew up near Big Sandy and Ament knew of Tester before either were famous. Ament campaigned for Tester in 2006 and 2018.

Ament is credited for the album artwork and art direction for the Pearl Jam albums Ten, the album photograph for Vs., and created the concept for Yield, which was nominated for the Best Recording Package Grammy in 1999. Ament has won two Grammys for his art design for the Pearl Jam album Lightning Bolt and the posthumous compilation album Chris Cornell.

In April 2009, Ament was attacked at knifepoint by a gang of muggers. According to Rolling Stone, Ament had just pulled up outside the Southern Tracks recording studio in Atlanta, Georgia, when his rented jeep was attacked by several men, who smashed the vehicle's windows and demanded money. The magazine also reported that Ament was knocked to the ground while trying to escape the robbers. He sustained a head injury and was treated at the scene. His Blackberry, passport and cash were stolen. The incident would lead one fan, Joe Hartgrove, with the idea of a charity in Ament's name, called Jeff Ament's Army, to be formed by Hartgrove, Roger McDaniel and Joanna Traver, and with the approval of Ament, started in 2011; their work includes the promoting of skate parks in the state of Montana.

== Discography ==
=== Green River discography ===
Year	Title	Label	Track(s)
1985	Come on Down	Homestead	All
1986	Deep Six	C/Z	"10,000 Things" and "Your Own Best Friend"
1987	Dry As a Bone	Sub Pop	All
1988	Motor City Madness	Glitterhouse	"Searchin' (Good Things Come)"
1988	Rehab Doll	Sub Pop	All
1988	Sub Pop 200	Sub Pop	"Hangin' Tree"
1989	This House Is Not a Motel	Glitterhouse	"Swallow My Pride"
1989	Sub Pop Rock City	Glitterhouse	"Hangin' Tree"
1989	Another Pyrrhic Victory: The Only Compilation of Dead Seattle God Bands	C/Z	"Bazaar" and "Away in Manger"
1990	Endangered Species	Glitterhouse	"Ain't Nothing to Do"
1990	Dry As a Bone/Rehab Doll	Sub Pop	All
1992	Afternoon Delight: Love Songs from Sub Pop	Sub Pop	"Baby Takes"
1996	Hype!: The Motion Picture Soundtrack	Sub Pop	"Swallow My Pride" (1987 demo)
2000	Wild and Wooly: The Northwest Rock Collection	Sub Pop	"This Town"
2006	Sleepless in Seattle: The Birth of Grunge	Livewire	"Come on Down"
2016	1984 Demos	Jackpot Records	All

=== Mother Love Bone discography ===
Year	Title	Label	Track(s)
1989	Shine	Stardog/Mercury	All
1990	Apple	Stardog/Mercury	All
1992	Singles: Original Motion Picture Soundtrack	Epic	"Chloe Dancer/Crown of Thorns"
1992	Mother Love Bone	Stardog/Mercury	All
1993	Thrash and Burn: The Metal Alternative	Sony Music Special Products	"Capricorn Sister"
1993	The Best of Grunge Rock	Priority	"Stardog Champion"
1995	Alterno-Daze: Natural 90s Selection	MCA	"Stardog Champion"
1997	Proud to Be Loud	Debutante	"Bone China"
2001	Alternative Moments	Sony Music Media	"Chloe Dancer/Crown of Thorns"
2007	The Road Mix: Music from the Television Series One Tree Hill, Volume 3	Maverick	"Chloe Dancer/Crown of Thorns"
2016	On Earth As It Is - The Complete Works	Monkeywrench	All

=== Temple of the Dog discography ===
Year	Title	Label
1991	Temple of the Dog	A&M

=== Three Fish discography ===
Year	Title	Label
1996	Three Fish	Epic
1999	The Quiet Table	Epic

=== Solo discography ===
Year	Title	Label	Format
2008	Tone	Self-released	LP, Digital
2012	While My Heart Beats	Monkeywrench	LP, CD
2018	Heaven/Hell	Monkeywrench	LP, Digital
2021	I Should Be Outside	Monkeywrench	LP, Digital

=== Deranged Diction discography ===
Year	Title	Label
2009	Life Support/No Art, No Cowboys, No Rules	Feedback

=== Tres Mts. discography ===
Year	Title	Label
2011	Three Mountains	Monkeywrench

=== RNDM discography ===
Year	Title	Label
2012	Acts	Monkeywrench
2016	Ghost Riding	Monkeywrench

=== Contributions and collaborations ===
Year	Group	Title	Label	Track(s)
1993	M.A.C.C. (Mike McCready, Jeff Ament, Matt Cameron, and Chris Cornell)	Stone Free: A Tribute to Jimi Hendrix	Reprise/WEA	"Hey Baby (Land of the New Rising Sun)"
1995	Neil Young	Mirror Ball	Reprise	All
1997	Tribe After Tribe	Pearls Before Swine	Bulletproof	Some
1998	Clodhopper	Red's Recovery Room	My Own Planet	"Café Joli" and "900 Miles"
2004	Jack Irons	Attention Dimension	Breaching Whale	"Dunes"
2004	King's X	Live All Over the Place	Brop! Records/Metal Blade	"Manic Depression"
