= Tribe After Tribe =

South African rock band, active in the 1980s

- Origin: Johannesburg, South Africa
- Genres: Alternative rock
- Years active: 1984–2009
- Past members: Robbi Robb, Robby Whitelaw, Barry Schneider, Bruce Williams, Dino Archon, Fuzzy Marcus, Niels Jensen and Reynold Carlson, Chris Frazier

Tribe After Tribe is a South African alternative rock band, formed in Johannesburg in 1984 by Robbi Robb. Former members included Robby Whitelaw, Barry Schneider, Bruce Williams, Dino Archon, Fuzzy Marcus, Niels Jensen and Reynold Carlson.

The band relocated to Los Angeles shortly after the release of their first album.

Tribe after Tribe are listed as one of the Top 40 South African Rock Legends by the South African Rock Encyclopedia.

== Discography ==
=== Singles ===
- "As I Went Out One Morning" (EMI) (1985)

=== Albums ===
- Power (1985), EMI
- Tribe After Tribe (1991), Atlantic
- Love Under Will (1993), Megaforce
- Pearls Before Swine (1997)
- Enchanted Entrance (2002), Dreamcatcher Records
- M.O.A.B (2009)
- Burg Herzberg Festival (2009)
