= 8/12/00 – Tampa, Florida =

Live album by Pearl Jam
- Released: February 27, 2001
- Recorded: August 12, 2000, Ice Palace, Tampa, Florida, United States
- Genre: Alternative rock
- Length: 136:54
- Language: English
- Label: Epic

Pearl Jam chronology
8/10/00 – West Palm Beach, Florida (2001)	8/12/00 – Tampa, Florida (2001)	8/14/00 – New Orleans, Louisiana (2001)

Professional ratings
Review scores
Source	Rating
AllMusic	2/5 stars

8/12/00 – Tampa, Florida is a two-disc live album and the thirty-second in a series of 72 live bootlegs released by the American alternative rock band Pearl Jam from the band's 2000 Binaural Tour. It was released along with the other official bootlegs from the first North American leg of the tour on February 27, 2001.

== Overview ==
The album was recorded on August 12, 2000, in Tampa, Florida at the Ice Palace. It was selected by the band as one of 18 "Ape/Man" shows from the tour, which, according to bassist Jeff Ament, were shows the band found "really exciting." AllMusic gave it two out of a possible five stars. Allmusic staff writer Zac Johnson said, "While the quality of the show is better than any 'real' bootleg out there, in comparison with some of the other live shows in this series it's lacking." It debuted at number 181 on the Billboard 200 album chart. The song "Last Exit" was played after "Grievance", but the tape machines malfunctioned and the song was lost. A masterboard tape version of the song was added to the end of the album. "Evacuation" from this show appears on the Touring Band 2000 DVD.

== Track listing ==
=== Disc one ===
1. "Interstellar Overdrive" (Syd Barrett, Nick Mason, Roger Waters, Richard Wright) – 1:47
2. "Corduroy" (Dave Abbruzzese, Jeff Ament, Stone Gossard, Mike McCready, Eddie Vedder) – 4:42
3. "Grievance" (Vedder) – 3:06
4. "Animal" (Abbruzzese, Ament, Gossard, McCready, Vedder) – 2:43
5. "Gods' Dice" (Ament) – 2:30
6. "Tremor Christ" (Abbruzzese, Ament, Gossard, McCready, Vedder) – 5:36
7. "Nothing as It Seems" (Ament) – 5:51
8. "Jeremy" (Vedder, Ament) – 5:32
9. "Evacuation" (Matt Cameron, Vedder) – 3:11
10. "Better Man" (Vedder) – 4:28
11. "Lukin" (Vedder) – 1:02
12. "Light Years" (Gossard, McCready, Vedder) – 5:03
13. "Daughter" (Abbruzzese, Ament, Gossard, McCready, Vedder) – 8:22
14. "Even Flow" (Vedder, Gossard) – 6:26
15. "Sleight of Hand" (Ament, Vedder) – 5:39
16. "Elderly Woman Behind the Counter in a Small Town" (Abbruzzese, Ament, Gossard, McCready, Vedder) – 3:37

=== Disc two ===
1. "State of Love and Trust" (Vedder, McCready, Ament) – 3:37
2. "Insignificance" (Vedder) – 4:21
3. "Rearviewmirror" (Abbruzzese, Ament, Gossard, McCready, Vedder) – 8:00
4. "Encore Break" – 0:44
5. "Do the Evolution" (Gossard, Vedder) – 3:43
6. "Hail, Hail" (Gossard, Vedder, Ament, McCready) – 3:28
7. "Garden" (Vedder, Gossard, Ament) – 6:32
8. "Immortality" (Abbruzzese, Ament, Gossard, McCready, Vedder) – 5:56
9. "Soldier of Love (Lay Down Your Arms)" (Buzz Cason, Tony Moon) – 2:42
10. "Porch" (Vedder) – 6:04
11. "Soon Forget" (Vedder) – 6:14
12. "Indifference" (Abbruzzese, Ament, Gossard, McCready, Vedder) – 5:57
13. "Rockin' in the Free World" (Neil Young) – 7:21
14. "Last Exit" (Abbruzzese, Ament, Gossard, McCready, Vedder) – 2:40

== Personnel ==
Pearl Jam

- Jeff Ament – bass guitar, design concept
- Matt Cameron – drums
- Stone Gossard – guitars
- Mike McCready – guitars
- Eddie Vedder – vocals, guitars, ukulele

Production

- John Burton – engineering
- Brett Eliason – mixing
- Brad Klausen – design and layout

== Chart positions ==
Chart (2001)	Position
US Billboard 200	181
