= 11/3/00 – Boise, Idaho =

Live album by Pearl Jam
- Released: March 27, 2001
- Recorded: November 3, 2000, Idaho Center, Nampa, Idaho, United States
- Genre: Alternative rock
- Length: 132:00
- Language: English
- Label: Epic

Pearl Jam chronology
11/2/00 – Portland, Oregon (2001)	11/3/00 – Boise, Idaho (2001)	11/5/00 – Seattle, Washington (2001)

Professional ratings
Review scores
Source	Rating
Allmusic	2.5/5 stars

11/3/00 – Boise, Idaho is a two-disc live album and the seventieth in a series of 72 live bootlegs released by the American alternative rock band Pearl Jam from the band's 2000 Binaural Tour. It was released along with the other official bootlegs from the second North American leg of the tour on March 27, 2001.

== Overview ==
The album was recorded on November 3, 2000, in Nampa, Idaho at the Idaho Center. The show features a particularly intense version of "Better Man". The band selected it as one of 18 "Ape/Man" shows from the tour, which, according to bassist Jeff Ament, were shows the band found "really exciting." Allmusic gave it two and a half out of a possible five stars. "Go" from this show appears on the Touring Band 2000 DVD.

== Track listing ==
=== Disc one ===
1. "Of the Girl" (Gossard) – 4:58
2. "Go" (Dave Abbruzzese, Jeff Ament, Stone Gossard, Mike McCready, Eddie Vedder) – 2:47
3. "Corduroy" (Abbruzzese, Ament, Gossard, McCready, Vedder) – 4:29
4. "Grievance" (Vedder) – 3:22
5. "Last Exit" (Abbruzzese, Ament, Gossard, McCready, Vedder) – 2:37
6. "Tremor Christ" (Abbruzzese, Ament, Gossard, McCready, Vedder) – 6:17
7. "Elderly Woman Behind the Counter in a Small Town" (Abbruzzese, Ament, Gossard, McCready, Vedder) – 3:39
8. "Insignificance" (Vedder) – 4:16
9. "Animal" (Abbruzzese, Ament, Gossard, McCready, Vedder) – 3:28
10. "Nothing as It Seems" (Ament) – 5:38
11. "I Got Id" (Vedder) – 4:28
12. "Better Man" (Vedder) – 5:27
13. "Even Flow" (Vedder, Gossard) – 5:57
14. "Daughter" (Abbruzzese, Ament, Gossard, McCready, Vedder) – 7:58
15. "Light Years" (Gossard, McCready, Vedder) – 4:53

=== Disc two ===
1. "Jeremy" (Vedder, Ament) – 5:03
2. "Given to Fly" (McCready, Vedder) – 3:44
3. "Rearviewmirror" (Abbruzzese, Ament, Gossard, McCready, Vedder) – 8:14
4. "Encore Break" – 2:37
5. "Don't Be Shy" (Cat Stevens) – 3:21
6. "Black" (Vedder, Gossard) – 6:46
7. "Crazy Mary" (Victoria Williams) – 5:09
8. "Do the Evolution" (Gossard, Vedder) – 3:33
9. "Spin the Black Circle" (Abbruzzese, Ament, Gossard, McCready, Vedder) – 2:35
10. "State of Love and Trust" (Vedder, McCready, Ament) – 5:01
11. "Parting Ways" (Vedder) – 9:19
12. "Rockin' in the Free World" (Neil Young) – 6:24

== Personnel ==
Pearl Jam

- Jeff Ament – bass guitar, design concept
- Matt Cameron – drums
- Stone Gossard – guitars
- Mike McCready – guitars
- Eddie Vedder – vocals, guitars

Production

- John Burton – engineering
- Brett Eliason – mixing
- Brad Klausen – design and layout
