= 10/22/00 – Las Vegas, Nevada =

Live album by Pearl Jam
- Released: March 27, 2001
- Recorded: October 22, 2000
- Venue: MGM Grand Arena, Paradise, Nevada, United States
- Genre: Alternative rock
- Length: 130:25
- Language: English
- Label: Epic

Pearl Jam chronology
10/21/00 – Phoenix, Arizona (2001)	10/22/00 – Las Vegas, Nevada (2001)	10/24/00 – Los Angeles, California (2001)

Professional ratings
Review scores
Source	Rating
Allmusic	2.5/5 stars

10/22/00 – Las Vegas, Nevada is a two-disc live album and the sixty-second in a series of 72 live bootlegs released by the American alternative rock band Pearl Jam from the band's 2000 Binaural Tour. It was released along with the other official bootlegs from the second North American leg of the tour on March 27, 2001.

== Overview ==
The album was recorded on October 22, 2000 in Paradise, Nevada at MGM Grand Arena. Pearl Jam celebrated the 10th anniversary of its first live performance as a band at this concert. Vocalist Eddie Vedder took the opportunity to thank the many people who had helped the band come together and make it to 10 years (including Kelly Curtis, Michael Goldstone, Michele Anthony, and Brendan O'Brien). He also noted that "I would never do this accepting a Grammy or something." This concert featured Pearl Jam's first ever performance of the Mother Love Bone song "Crown of Thorns".

It was selected by the band as one of 18 "Ape/Man" shows from the tour, which, according to bassist Jeff Ament, were shows the band found "really exciting." Allmusic gave it two and a half out of a possible five stars. Allmusic staff writer Steven Jacobetz said that "more casual fans seeking the best of live Pearl Jam should seek another, more carefree night." It debuted at number 152 on the Billboard 200 album chart. "Untitled" and "MFC" from this show appear on the Touring Band 2000 DVD.

== Track listing ==
=== Disc one ===
1. "Interstellar Overdrive" (Syd Barrett, Nick Mason, Roger Waters, Richard Wright) – 1:28
2. "Corduroy" (Dave Abbruzzese, Jeff Ament, Stone Gossard, Mike McCready, Eddie Vedder) – 4:38
3. "Breakerfall" (Vedder) – 2:34
4. "Grievance" (Vedder) – 3:04
5. "Last Exit" (Abbruzzese, Ament, Gossard, McCready, Vedder) – 2:36
6. "Animal" (Abbruzzese, Ament, Gossard, McCready, Vedder) – 4:03
7. "Dissident" (Abbruzzese, Ament, Gossard, McCready, Vedder) – 3:50
8. "Nothing as It Seems" (Ament) – 5:29
9. "Given to Fly" (McCready, Vedder) – 3:40
10. "Wishlist" (Vedder) – 4:03
11. "Untitled" (Vedder) – 1:46
12. "MFC" (Vedder) – 6:49
13. "Even Flow" (Vedder, Gossard) – 5:56
14. "Jeremy" (Vedder, Ament) – 4:49
15. "Insignificance" (Vedder) – 4:21
16. "Better Man" (Vedder) – 3:57
17. "Lukin" (Vedder) – 0:56
18. "Rearviewmirror" (Abbruzzese, Ament, Gossard, McCready, Vedder) – 7:42

=== Disc two ===
1. "Do the Evolution" (Gossard, Vedder) – 4:01
2. "Once" (Vedder, Gossard) – 7:34
3. "Crown of Thorns" (Ament, Bruce Fairweather, Greg Gilmore, Gossard, Andrew Wood) – 7:16
4. "Black" (Vedder, Gossard) – 7:15
5. "Can't Help Falling in Love" (Luigi Creatore, Hugo Peretti, George David Weiss) – 2:28
6. "Elderly Woman Behind the Counter in a Small Town" (Abbruzzese, Ament, Gossard, McCready, Vedder) – 3:43
7. "Mankind" (Gossard) – 3:16
8. "Last Kiss" (Wayne Cochran) – 3:07
9. "Porch" (Vedder) – 9:32
10. "Baba O'Riley" (Pete Townshend) – 4:19
11. "Yellow Ledbetter" (Ament, McCready, Vedder) – 6:13

== Personnel ==
Pearl Jam

- Jeff Ament – bass guitar, design concept
- Matt Cameron – drums
- Stone Gossard – guitars, lead vocals (on "Mankind")
- Mike McCready – guitars
- Eddie Vedder – vocals, guitars

Production

- John Burton – engineering
- Brett Eliason – mixing
- Brad Klausen – design and layout

== Chart positions ==
Chart (2001)	Position
US Billboard 200	152
