= 10/25/00 – San Diego, California =

Live album by Pearl Jam
- Released: March 27, 2001
- Recorded: October 25, 2000, San Diego Sports Arena, San Diego, California, United States
- Genre: Alternative rock
- Length: 125:01
- Language: English
- Label: Epic

Pearl Jam chronology
10/24/00 – Los Angeles, California (2001)	10/25/00 – San Diego, California (2001)	10/27/00 – Fresno, California (2001)

Professional ratings
Review scores
Source	Rating
Allmusic	2.5/5 stars

10/25/00 – San Diego, California is a two-disc live album and the sixty-fourth in a series of 72 live bootlegs released by the American alternative rock band Pearl Jam from the band's 2000 Binaural Tour. It was released along with the other official bootlegs from the second North American leg of the tour on March 27, 2001.

== Overview ==
The album was recorded on October 25, 2000, in San Diego, California at the San Diego Sports Arena. It was selected by the band as one of 18 "Ape/Man" shows from the tour, which, according to bassist Jeff Ament, were shows the band found "really exciting." Allmusic gave it two and a half out of a possible five stars. Allmusic staff writer Steven Jacobetz called it a "flawed but psychologically revealing performance, which is absolutely essential for serious Pearl Jam collectors, or for anyone curious about the band's state of mind near the end of a hard year of touring." "Jeremy" from this show appears on the Touring Band 2000 DVD.

== Track listing ==
=== Disc one ===
1. "Long Road" (Eddie Vedder) – 6:34
2. "Breakerfall" (Vedder) – 2:37
3. "Corduroy" (Dave Abbruzzese, Jeff Ament, Stone Gossard, Mike McCready, Vedder) – 4:36
4. "Whipping" (Abbruzzese, Ament, Gossard, McCready, Vedder) – 2:45
5. "Gods' Dice" (Ament) – 2:34
6. "Animal" (Abbruzzese, Ament, Gossard, McCready, Vedder) – 3:44
7. "Given to Fly" (McCready, Vedder) – 3:45
8. "Even Flow" (Vedder, Gossard) – 6:41
9. "Wishlist" (Vedder) – 3:51
10. "Rearviewmirror" (Abbruzzese, Ament, Gossard, McCready, Vedder) – 6:24
11. "Rival" (Gossard) – 4:00
12. "Jeremy" (Vedder, Ament) – 5:02
13. "Pilate" (Ament) – 3:02
14. "MFC" (Vedder) – 2:32
15. "Daughter" (Abbruzzese, Ament, Gossard, McCready, Vedder) – 7:11
16. "Soon Forget" (Vedder) – 2:06

=== Disc two ===
1. "Immortality" (Abbruzzese, Ament, Gossard, McCready, Vedder) – 7:49
2. "Insignificance" (Vedder) – 4:37
3. "Go" (Abbruzzese, Ament, Gossard, McCready, Vedder) – 3:29
4. "Encore Break" – 2:25
5. "Don't Be Shy" (Cat Stevens) – 2:56
6. "In My Tree" (Gossard, Jack Irons, Vedder) – 3:51
7. "State of Love and Trust" (Vedder, McCready, Ament) – 3:27
8. "Once" (Vedder, Gossard) – 4:23
9. "Elderly Woman Behind the Counter in a Small Town" (Abbruzzese, Ament, Gossard, McCready, Vedder) – 3:26
10. "Black" (Vedder, Gossard) – 7:20
11. "Parting Ways" (Vedder) – 7:53
12. "Yellow Ledbetter" (Ament, McCready, Vedder) – 6:01

== Personnel ==
Pearl Jam

- Jeff Ament – bass guitar, design concept
- Matt Cameron – drums
- Stone Gossard – guitars
- Mike McCready – guitars
- Eddie Vedder – vocals, guitars, ukulele

Production

- John Burton – engineering
- Brett Eliason – mixing
- Brad Klausen – design and layout
