= 6/22/00 – Milan, Italy =

2000 live album by Pearl Jam

Live album by Pearl Jam
- Released: September 26, 2000
- Recorded: June 22, 2000; Fila Forum Arena, Milan, Italy
- Genre: Alternative rock
- Length: 145:27
- Language: English
- Label: Epic

Pearl Jam chronology
6/20/00 – Verona, Italy (2000)	6/22/00 – Milan, Italy (2000)	6/23/00 – Zurich, Switzerland (2000)

6/22/00 – Milan, Italy is a two-disc live album and the twentieth in a series of 72 live bootlegs released by the American alternative rock band Pearl Jam from the band's 2000 Binaural Tour. It was released along with the other official bootlegs from the European leg of the tour on September 26, 2000.

== Overview ==
The album was recorded on June 22, 2000 in Milan, Italy at the indoor sporting arena Fila Forum Arena. It was selected by the band as one of 18 "Ape/Man" shows from the tour, which, according to bassist Jeff Ament, were shows the band found "really exciting." Allmusic gave it three out of a possible five stars. Allmusic staff writer Shawn Haney said, "The record can be dubbed as a solid live performance in front of quite a jubilant crowd of thousands." It debuted at number 125 on the Billboard 200 album chart.

== Track listing ==
=== Disc one ===
1. "Of the Girl" (Stone Gossard) – 5:37
2. "Corduroy" (Dave Abbruzzese, Jeff Ament, Gossard, Mike McCready, Eddie Vedder) – 4:49
3. "Grievance" (Vedder) – 3:18
4. "Gods' Dice" (Ament) – 2:26
5. "Animal" (Abbruzzese, Ament, Gossard, McCready, Vedder) – 2:49
6. "Given to Fly" (McCready, Vedder) – 3:46
7. "Rival" (Gossard) – 3:30
8. "Elderly Woman Behind the Counter in a Small Town" (Abbruzzese, Ament, Gossard, McCready, Vedder) – 3:32
9. "Even Flow" (Vedder, Gossard) – 5:32
10. "Not for You" (Abbruzzese, Ament, Gossard, McCready, Vedder) – 5:58
11. "Thin Air" (Gossard) – 3:30
12. "Light Years" (Gossard, McCready, Vedder) – 6:08
13. "MFC" (Vedder) – 2:40
14. "Present Tense" (McCready, Vedder) – 6:02
15. "Daughter" (Abbruzzese, Ament, Gossard, McCready, Vedder) – 7:36
16. "Jeremy" (Vedder, Ament) – 5:26

=== Disc two ===
1. "Go" (Abbruzzese, Ament, Gossard, McCready, Vedder) – 3:33
2. "Encore Break" – 2:54
3. "Nothingman" (Vedder, Ament) – 4:54
4. "Sleight of Hand" (Ament, Vedder) – 4:37
5. "Better Man" (Vedder) – 4:00
6. "Wishlist" (Vedder) – 4:26
7. "Insignificance" (Vedder) – 4:28
8. "Rearviewmirror" (Abbruzzese, Ament, Gossard, McCready, Vedder) – 7:54
9. "Do the Evolution" (Gossard, Vedder) – 3:57
10. "Garden" (Vedder, Gossard, Ament) – 6:36
11. "State of Love and Trust" (Vedder, McCready, Ament) – 3:45
12. "Black" (Vedder, Gossard) – 10:17
13. "Smile" (Ament, Vedder) – 4:15
14. "Rockin' in the Free World" (Neil Young) – 7:12

== Personnel ==
Pearl Jam

- Jeff Ament – bass guitar, design concept
- Matt Cameron – drums
- Stone Gossard – guitars
- Mike McCready – guitars
- Eddie Vedder – vocals, guitars

Production

- John Burton – engineering
- Brett Eliason – mixing
- Brad Klausen – design and layout

== Chart positions ==
Chart (2000)	Position
US Billboard 200	125
