= 6/8/00 – Paris, France =

Live album by Pearl Jam
- Released: September 26, 2000
- Recorded: June 8, 2000, Palais Omnisports de Paris-Bercy, Paris, France
- Genre: Alternative rock
- Length: 126:48
- Language: English
- Label: Epic

Pearl Jam chronology
| 6/6/00 – Cardiff, Wales (2000) | 6/8/00 – Paris, France (2000) | 6/9/00 – Nürburg, Germany (2000) |

Professional ratings
Review scores
| Source | Rating |
|---|---|
| AllMusic | 2/5 stars |

6/8/00 – Paris, France is a two-disc live album and the tenth in a series of 72 live bootlegs released by the American alternative rock band Pearl Jam from the band's 2000 Binaural Tour. It was released along with the other official bootlegs from the European leg of the tour on September 26, 2000.

== Overview ==
The album was recorded on June 8, 2000 in Paris, France at the indoor sports arena Palais Omnisports de Paris-Bercy. It was selected by the band as one of 18 "Ape/Man" shows from the tour, which, according to bassist Jeff Ament, were shows the band found "really exciting." Allmusic gave it two out of a possible five stars. Allmusic staff writer Zac Johnson said, "Unfortunately, Vedder's troubled voice and the band's inability to fully gel slow the set down, but it still stands as a fine representation of where the band was on that particular night."

== Track listing ==
=== Disc one ===
1. "Sometimes" (Eddie Vedder) – 2:59
2. "Breakerfall" (Vedder) – 2:38
3. "Corduroy" (Dave Abbruzzese, Jeff Ament, Stone Gossard, Mike McCready, Vedder) – 4:51
4. "Gods' Dice" (Ament) – 2:34
5. "Animal" (Abbruzzese, Ament, Gossard, McCready, Vedder) – 3:11
6. "Nothing as It Seems" (Ament) – 5:46
7. "Given to Fly" (McCready, Vedder) – 3:55
8. "Evacuation" (Matt Cameron, Vedder) – 2:52
9. "Alive" (Vedder, Gossard) – 6:13
10. "Pilate" (Ament) – 3:10
11. "Better Man" (Vedder) – 4:22
12. "Insignificance" (Vedder) – 4:32
13. "Daughter" (Abbruzzese, Ament, Gossard, McCready, Vedder) – 7:28
14. "In Hiding" (Gossard, Vedder) – 5:15
15. "Wishlist" (Vedder) – 3:47
16. "Grievance" (Vedder) – 3:30

=== Disc two ===
1. "Even Flow" (Vedder, Gossard) – 5:29
2. "Rearviewmirror" (Abbruzzese, Ament, Gossard, McCready, Vedder) – 7:26
3. "Encore Break" – 4:25
4. "Hail, Hail" (Gossard, Vedder, Ament, McCready) – 3:19
5. "Go" (Abbruzzese, Ament, Gossard, McCready, Vedder) – 5:34
6. "Once" (Vedder, Gossard) – 3:34
7. "Light Years" (Gossard, McCready, Vedder) – 5:05
8. "Elderly Woman Behind the Counter in a Small Town" (Abbruzzese, Ament, Gossard, McCready, Vedder) – 3:38
9. "Black" (Vedder, Gossard) – 7:59
10. "Fuckin' Up" (Neil Young) – 5:41
11. "Yellow Ledbetter" (Ament, McCready, Vedder) – 7:35

== Personnel ==
Pearl Jam

- Jeff Ament – bass guitar, design concept
- Matt Cameron – drums
- Stone Gossard – guitars
- Mike McCready – guitars
- Eddie Vedder – vocals, guitars

Production

- John Burton – engineering
- Brett Eliason – mixing
- Brad Klausen – design and layout

== Chart positions ==
| Chart (2000) | Position |
|---|---|
| French Albums Chart | 56 |
