= 6/20/00 – Verona, Italy =

Live album by Pearl Jam
- Released: September 26, 2000
- Recorded: June 20, 2000; Arena di Verona, Verona, Italy
- Genre: Alternative rock
- Length: 132:53
- Language: English
- Label: Epic

Pearl Jam chronology
6/19/00 – Ljubljana, Slovenia (2000)	6/20/00 – Verona, Italy (2000)	6/22/00 – Milan, Italy (2000)

6/20/00 – Verona, Italy is a two-disc live album and the nineteenth in a series of 72 live bootlegs released by the American alternative rock band Pearl Jam from the band's 2000 Binaural Tour. It was released along with the other official bootlegs from the European leg of the tour on September 26, 2000.

== Overview ==
The album was recorded on June 20, 2000 in Verona, Italy at the Roman amphitheatre Arena di Verona. It was selected by the band as one of 18 "Ape/Man" shows from the tour, which, according to bassist Jeff Ament, were shows the band found "really exciting". Allmusic gave it two and a half out of a possible five stars. Allmusic staff writer Steven Jacobetz called it "one to get in Pearl Jam's official bootleg series". It debuted at number 134 on the Billboard 200 album chart.

== Track listing ==
=== Disc one ===
1. "Long Road" (Eddie Vedder) – 5:17
2. "Grievance" (Vedder) – 3:13
3. "Corduroy" (Dave Abbruzzese, Jeff Ament, Stone Gossard, Mike McCready, Vedder) – 4:42
4. "Hail, Hail" (Gossard, Vedder, Ament, McCready) – 3:30
5. "Animal" (Abbruzzese, Ament, Gossard, McCready, Vedder) – 2:59
6. "Nothing as It Seems" (Ament) – 6:25
7. "Pilate" (Ament) – 2:55
8. "Given to Fly" (McCready, Vedder) – 3:50
9. "Even Flow" (Vedder, Gossard) – 5:52
10. "MFC" (Vedder) – 2:32
11. "Habit" (Vedder) – 3:34
12. "Wishlist" (Vedder) – 3:47
13. "Daughter" (Abbruzzese, Ament, Gossard, McCready, Vedder) – 6:08
14. "State of Love and Trust" (Vedder, McCready, Ament) – 3:30
15. "Once" (Vedder, Gossard) – 3:22
16. "Lukin" (Vedder) – 1:03
17. "Immortality" (Abbruzzese, Ament, Gossard, McCready, Vedder) – 7:02

=== Disc two ===
1. "Insignificance" (Vedder) – 4:46
2. "Rearviewmirror" (Abbruzzese, Ament, Gossard, McCready, Vedder) – 6:21
3. "Encore Break" – 3:12
4. "In the Colosseum" – 1:00
5. "Black" (Vedder, Gossard) – 6:24
6. "Breakerfall" (Vedder) – 2:39
7. "Do the Evolution" (Gossard, Vedder) – 4:26
8. "Elderly Woman Behind the Counter in a Small Town" (Abbruzzese, Ament, Gossard, McCready, Vedder) – 4:06
9. "Better Man" (Vedder) – 3:54
10. "I Got You" (Neil Finn) – 4:18
11. "Alive" (Vedder, Gossard) – 6:13
12. "Last Kiss" (Wayne Cochran) – 3:41
13. "Porch" (Vedder) – 6:07
14. "Soon Forget" (Vedder) – 2:06
15. "Yellow Ledbetter" (Ament, McCready, Vedder) – 6:59

== Personnel ==
Pearl Jam

- Jeff Ament – bass guitar, design concept
- Matt Cameron – drums
- Stone Gossard – guitars
- Mike McCready – guitars
- Eddie Vedder – vocals, guitars, ukulele

Production

- John Burton – engineering
- Brett Eliason – mixing
- Brad Klausen – design and layout

== Chart positions ==
Chart (2000)	Position
Australian Albums Chart	46
US Billboard 200	134
