= 8/25/00 – Jones Beach, New York =

Live album by Pearl Jam
- Released: February 27, 2001
- Recorded: August 25, 2000, Jones Beach Amphitheater, Wantagh, New York, United States
- Genre: Alternative rock
- Length: 137:28
- Language: English
- Label: Epic

Pearl Jam chronology
8/24/00 – Jones Beach, New York (2001)	8/25/00 – Jones Beach, New York (2001)	8/27/00 – Saratoga, New York (2001)

Professional ratings
Review scores
Source	Rating
AllMusic	4.5/5 stars

8/25/00 – Jones Beach, New York is a two-disc live album and the forty-first in a series of 72 live bootlegs released by the American alternative rock band Pearl Jam from the band's 2000 Binaural Tour. It was released along with the other official bootlegs from the first North American leg of the tour on February 27, 2001.

== Overview ==
The album was recorded on August 25, 2000, in Wantagh, New York at Jones Beach Amphitheater. It was selected by the band as one of 18 "Ape/Man" shows from the tour, which, according to bassist Jeff Ament, were shows the band found "really exciting." AllMusic gave it four and a half out of a possible five stars. Allmusic staff writer Zac Johnson said, "The last show in Jones Beach proves to be one of those nights where everything falls into place: The band feeds off of the crowd's energy, and the audience pays them back in full. One of the better shows in this series by far." It debuted at number 159 on the Billboard 200 album chart.

== Track listing ==
=== Disc one ===
1. "Sometimes" (Eddie Vedder) – 3:19
2. "Grievance" (Vedder) – 3:09
3. "Corduroy" (Dave Abbruzzese, Jeff Ament, Stone Gossard, Mike McCready, Vedder) – 4:25
4. "Whipping" (Abbruzzese, Ament, Gossard, McCready, Vedder) – 2:43
5. "Do the Evolution" (Gossard, Vedder) – 3:32
6. "Animal" (Abbruzzese, Ament, Gossard, McCready, Vedder) – 2:41
7. "Evacuation" (Matt Cameron, Vedder) – 2:57
8. "Red Mosquito" (Ament, Gossard, Jack Irons, McCready, Vedder) – 5:22
9. "In Hiding" (Gossard, Vedder) – 5:16
10. "Even Flow" (Vedder, Gossard) – 5:15
11. "Mankind" (Gossard) – 3:52
12. "Untitled" (Vedder) – 2:19
13. "MFC" (Vedder) – 2:30
14. "Rearviewmirror" (Abbruzzese, Ament, Gossard, McCready, Vedder) – 7:46
15. "Present Tense" (McCready, Vedder) – 5:55
16. "Given to Fly" (McCready, Vedder) – 4:04
17. "Thin Air" (Gossard) – 3:28

=== Disc two ===
1. "Off He Goes" (Vedder) – 5:50
2. "Black" (Vedder, Gossard) – 7:08
3. "Jeremy" (Vedder, Ament) – 6:02
4. "Immortality" (Abbruzzese, Ament, Gossard, McCready, Vedder) – 7:20
5. "Encore Break" – 0:44
6. "Go" (Abbruzzese, Ament, Gossard, McCready, Vedder) – 2:54
7. "Insignificance" (Vedder) – 4:31
8. "In My Tree" (Gossard, Irons, Vedder) – 4:52
9. "Elderly Woman Behind the Counter in a Small Town" (Abbruzzese, Ament, Gossard, McCready, Vedder) – 4:32
10. "Better Man" (Vedder) – 5:54
11. "Smile" (Ament, Vedder) – 6:21
12. "Baba O'Riley" (Pete Townshend) – 6:22
13. "Yellow Ledbetter" (Ament, McCready, Vedder) – 6:25

== Personnel ==
Pearl Jam

- Jeff Ament – bass guitar, design concept
- Matt Cameron – drums
- Stone Gossard – guitars
- Mike McCready – guitars
- Eddie Vedder – vocals, guitars

Production

- John Burton – engineering
- Brett Eliason – mixing
- Brad Klausen – design and layout

== Chart positions ==
Chart (2001)	Position
US Billboard 200	159
