= 11/6/00 – Seattle, Washington =

Live album by Pearl Jam
- Released: March 27, 2001
- Recorded: November 6, 2000, KeyArena, Seattle, Washington, United States
- Genre: Alternative rock
- Length: 160:34
- Language: English
- Label: Epic

Pearl Jam chronology
| 11/5/00 – Seattle, Washington (2001) | 11/6/00 – Seattle, Washington (2001) | Riot Act (2002) |

11/6/00 – Seattle, Washington is a three-disc live album and the seventy-second and final in a long series of live bootlegs that the American alternative rock band Pearl Jam released from the band's 2000 Binaural Tour. It was released along with the other official bootlegs from the second North American leg of the tour on March 27, 2001.

== Overview ==
The album was recorded on November 6, 2000, in Seattle, Washington at KeyArena. This was the band's last show of its three-leg 2000 tour. The band performed at this show for over three hours, playing most of its hits along with selected cover songs such as "The Kids Are Alright" and "Baba O'Riley" by The Who, one of Pearl Jam's biggest musical influences. This show also featured the North American tour's first performance of "Alive", which had been purposely omitted from all shows on the tour.

This show was selected by the band as one of 18 "Ape/Man" shows from the tour, which, according to bassist Jeff Ament, were shows the band found "really exciting." Allmusic called the show an "essential live document," and gave it four and a half out of a possible five stars. Allmusic staff writer Douglas Siwek said that "by the time they hit their hometown of Seattle in November 2000, it was obvious that the band was truly in sync musically." It debuted at number 98 on the Billboard 200 album chart and was the highest charting official bootleg out of the entire series. "Leatherman", "Better Man", "Nothingman", "Nothing as It Seems", and "Rearviewmirror" from this show appear on the Touring Band 2000 DVD.

== Critical reception ==
Professional ratings
Review scores
| Source | Rating |
|---|---|
| Allmusic | 4.5/5 stars |
| The Rolling Stone Album Guide | 5/5 stars |

== Track listing ==
=== Disc one ===
1. "Release" (Jeff Ament, Stone Gossard, Dave Krusen, Mike McCready, Eddie Vedder) – 5:13
2. "Corduroy" (Dave Abbruzzese, Ament, Gossard, McCready, Vedder) – 4:28
3. "Grievance" (Vedder) – 3:07
4. "Rearviewmirror" (Abbruzzese, Ament, Gossard, McCready, Vedder) – 6:17
5. "Hail, Hail" (Gossard, Vedder, Ament, McCready) – 3:23
6. "Evacuation" (Matt Cameron, Vedder) – 2:58
7. "Dissident" (Abbruzzese, Ament, Gossard, McCready, Vedder) – 5:23
8. "Nothing as It Seems" (Ament) – 5:35
9. "In Hiding" (Gossard, Vedder) – 5:23
10. "Leatherman" (Vedder) – 5:13
11. "Better Man" (Vedder) – 5:13
12. "Nothingman" (Vedder, Ament) – 4:39

=== Disc two ===
1. "Even Flow" (Vedder, Gossard) – 6:10
2. "Jeremy" (Vedder, Ament) – 4:53
3. "Lukin" (Vedder) – 0:51
4. "Not for You" (Abbruzzese, Ament, Gossard, McCready, Vedder) – 5:47
5. "Daughter" (Abbruzzese, Ament, Gossard, McCready, Vedder) – 9:42
6. "Encore Break" – 4:07
7. "Off He Goes" (Vedder) – 5:38
8. "Light Years" (Gossard, McCready, Vedder) – 5:46
9. "Parting Ways" (Vedder) – 5:03
10. "Go" (Abbruzzese, Ament, Gossard, McCready, Vedder) – 2:47
11. "Once" (Vedder, Gossard) – 3:27

=== Disc three ===
1. "Crazy Mary" (Victoria Williams) – 5:43
2. "Immortality" (Abbruzzese, Ament, Gossard, McCready, Vedder) – 6:19
3. "Alive" (Vedder, Gossard) – 11:57
4. "Soon Forget" (Vedder) – 5:48
5. "The Kids Are Alright" (Pete Townshend) – 2:51
6. "Baba O'Riley" (Townshend) – 9:42
7. "Yellow Ledbetter" (Ament, McCready, Vedder) – 7:11

== Personnel ==
Pearl Jam

- Jeff Ament – bass guitar, design concept
- Matt Cameron – drums
- Stone Gossard – guitars
- Mike McCready – guitars
- Eddie Vedder – vocals, guitars, ukulele

Additional musicians and production

- John Burton – engineering
- April Cameron – viola
- Brett Eliason – mixing
- Justine Foy – cello
- Brad Klausen – design and layout

== Chart positions ==
| Chart (2001) | Position |
|---|---|
| Canadian Alternative Albums (Nielsen Soundscan) | 22 |
| US Billboard 200 | 98 |
