= Double album =

Audio recordings spanning two units of a medium

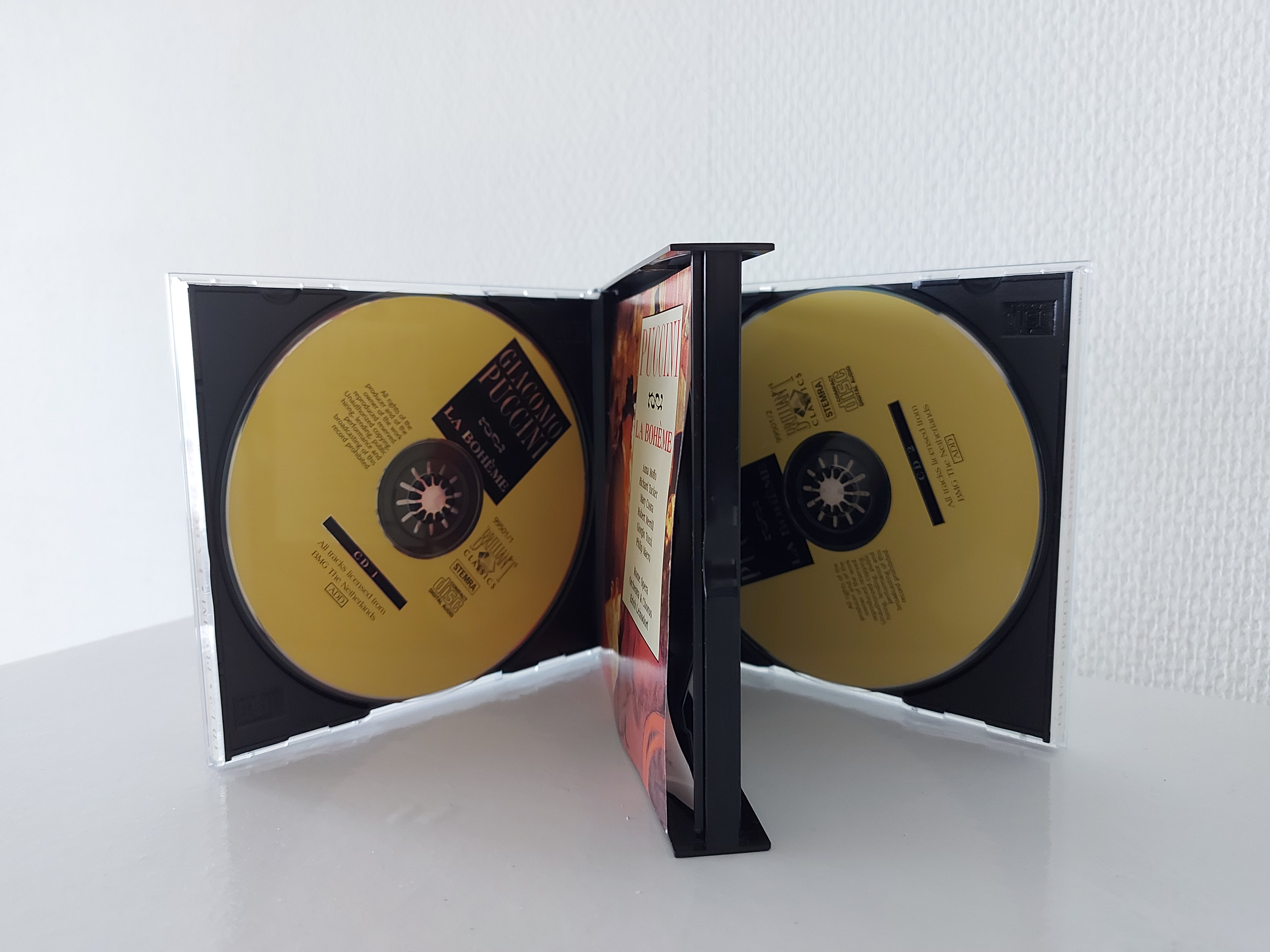
A double album on compact disc

A double album (or double record) is an audio album that spans two units of the primary medium in which it is sold, typically either records or compact disc. A double album is usually, though not always, released as such because the recording is longer than the capacity of the medium. Recording artists often think of double albums as being a single piece artistically; however, there are exceptions, such as John Lennon's Some Time in New York City (which consisted of one studio record and one live album packaged together) and OutKast's Speakerboxxx/The Love Below (effectively two solo albums, one by each member of the duo). Since the advent of the compact disc, albums are sometimes released with a bonus disc featuring additional material as a supplement to the main album, with live tracks, studio out-takes, cut songs, or older unreleased material. One innovation was the inclusion of a DVD of related material with a compact disc, such as video related to the album or DVD-Audio versions of the same recordings. Some such discs were also released on a two-sided format called DualDisc.

Depending on the media used, some releases were double albums in one format and single albums in another. For example, a gramophone record (vinyl LP) consisting of two discs of less than 80 minutes in total could be fit onto a single standard-length compact disc (CD). Other times, track order could vary between two different media by rearranging the tracks in one medium, or a more efficient use of space could be made; for example, reducing a double album in LP format to a single cassette tape.

The same principles apply to the triple album, which comprises three units. Packages with more units than three are often referred to as a box set.

== History ==
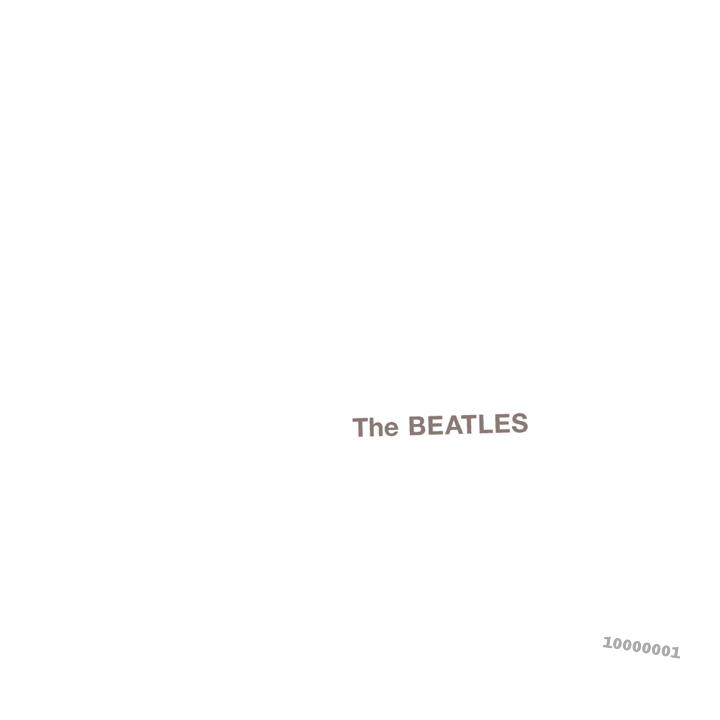
Cover for The Beatles (1968), colloquially known as The White Album, one of the best-selling double albums of all time

=== 1948 to the early 1970s: long-play records ===
The introduction of the long-play or LP record in 1948 allowed longer tracks or a greater number of tracks per record, with approximately 22 minutes of music per side, for a total of 44 minutes. Despite this, recordings of entire classical or operatic pieces were often too long for one LP disc, thus albums of two or more discs were made. As they were costly to make and sell, double albums and multi-record releases were largely limited to long works such as classical music and, later, to live recordings and compilations. One of the first live double albums, and one of the earliest double albums featuring non-classical music, was The Famous 1938 Carnegie Hall Jazz Concert by Benny Goodman, a concert recording released in 1950 on Columbia Records. Studio recordings of operas have been released as double, triple, quadruple and quintuple albums since the 1950s.

As record costs reduced over time and greater thought was given to the album as an artistic piece, double albums became more common. One of the first examples consisting of new studio recordings is 1956's Ella Fitzgerald Sings the Cole Porter Song Book. Bob Dylan's Blonde on Blonde, released on June 20, 1966, is widely mislabeled as the first double album. It was followed just a week later by the Mothers of Invention's Freak Out!, the first debut double album, which was released on June 27, 1966.

In the years following, original double albums from pop and rock artists became more common, and were often released at the height of the artists' careers. Notable examples include Jimi Hendrix's Electric Ladyland from October 1968, The Beatles' eponymous 1968 album, Elton John's Goodbye Yellow Brick Road from 1973, Led Zeppelin's Physical Graffiti from 1975, and Stevie Wonder's Songs in the Key of Life from 1976. Additionally, the rise of progressive rock at the time, which often involves complex and long tracks akin to classical music, and concept albums often made a second disc necessary. Notable examples include Yes's 4-track Tales From Topographic Oceans from 1973 and Genesis's The Lamb Lies Down on Broadway from 1974. The best-selling double album of all time is Pink Floyd's The Wall, from 1979 with over 30 million copies (60 million units) sold worldwide.

=== Late 1970s–1990s: compact cassette tapes and CDs ===
In the latter half of the 1970s, as technology advanced, the Philips corporation's compact cassette tape began to supersede LPs as the dominant pre-recorded music format. The tapes allowed for a much longer 30 to 45 minutes per side, for a total of 60 to 90 minutes total, doubling the length available for music storage. In 1982, Philips introduced the compact disc, with a continuous length of 74 minutes (later developed to have 80 minutes). Artists could put far more on one unit, rarely exceeding the runtime available on a cassette tape or CD, and double albums became uncommon. The extra space also allowed many earlier double albums to be reissued on a single disc: Blonde on Blonde, for instance, was reissued on a single cassette and a single CD.

Despite the greater length, there were some issues with the length and track order of albums, both reissues and new releases. The Beatles, originally released as a double LP, remained split across two units for both its cassette and CD reissues, with the tracks in a different order on the pair of cassettes to ensure equal tape length. Meanwhile, 1988's He's the DJ, I'm the Rapper by DJ Jazzy Jeff & The Fresh Prince was released on both vinyl and cassette. At 85 minutes, the vinyl record was released as a double album, making it the first double vinyl LP release by hip-hop artists, while its single CD release was truncated by 13 minutes. Other albums originally issued as double LPs, such as Fleetwood Mac's Tusk (1979), Prince's 1999 (1982), and The Minutemen's Double Nickels on the Dime (1984) were likewise shortened for their 74-minute CD release, though the former two were later reissued in their entirety when 80-minute CDs were available.

While not as common since the advent of these formats, particularly for studio albums, double albums continued to be released, particularly for live recordings, classical music, soundtracks, compilations, and reissues of double-LP albums that still exceeded the 80-minute CD limit. A number of popular studio albums were released as double albums on these formats at this time, such as the Smashing Pumpkins' Mellon Collie and the Infinite Sadness (1995) and Michael Jackson's HIStory: Past, Present and Future, Book I (1995) which sold over 20 million copies (40 million units) worldwide. The following year, Tupac Shakur became the first rapper to sell a double album globally with All Eyez on Me, becoming his best selling album by the time he died in 1996.

== Sequencing ==
Some double album releases through the 1970s are optimized for automatic sequencing on record changers, as both vinyl discs are initially stacked together on the record player. Thus, sides 1 and 4 are on one disc and sides 2 and 3 are on the other. This sequencing, used previously in multi-disc albums in the 78rpm era, let the listener play through the entire double album as a stack of discs, only needing to flip the stack once, compared to manual sequencing in which the listener would have to return three times to the record player. The use of automatic sequencing gradually declined during the 1970s as automatic record changers fell out of favor.

After a company decided on manual or automatic sequence, production of that title generally stayed in the same configuration indefinitely. Notable examples of albums using automatic sequence include the 1968 Reprise Records release, Electric Ladyland, by The Jimi Hendrix Experience which was still sold in automatic sequence well into the late 1980s. Other common examples include Frampton Comes Alive! by Peter Frampton, Songs in the Key of Life by Stevie Wonder, Tommy and Quadrophenia by The Who, and Bad Girls by Donna Summer.

== Triple album ==
Among the first successful triple albums (or triple records) were the live album Woodstock: Music from the Original Soundtrack and More released on August 15, 1970, and the studio album George Harrison's All Things Must Pass released on November 27, 1970. A triple album may be live, such as The Band's The Last Waltz (1978) and Led Zeppelin's How the West Was Won (2003) or a compilation of an artist's work, such as Stevie Wonder's retrospective anthology Looking Back. Yes's live album Yessongs (1972) was made a triple album owing to its inclusion of many of the band's longer compositions. With the longer time available on compact disc, many albums that spanned three vinyl discs are able to fit on two compact discs (for example, Nine Inch Nails' The Fragile (1999)).

Triple albums are released across genres, including punk with The Clash's Sandinista!; alternative rock with Pearl Jam's 11/6/00 – Seattle, Washington; and mainstream pop with Prince's Emancipation.

Frank Sinatra's Trilogy: Past Present Future was originally released as a three LP set in 1980. Compact disc pressings of the album combine the triple vinyl set onto two CDs, with "Past" and "Present" taking up the first disc.

== See also ==
- Double EP
- List of double albums
- List of triple albums
