= Touring Band 2000 =

Video by Pearl Jam
- Released: May 1, 2001
- Recorded: August 12 – November 6, 2000, various venues
- Genre: Alternative rock
- Length: 177 minutes
- Language: English
- Label: Epic

Pearl Jam chronology
Single Video Theory (1998)	Touring Band 2000 (2001)	Live at the Showbox (2003)

Professional ratings
Review scores
Source	Rating
AllMusic	4.5/5 stars

Touring Band 2000 is the second DVD release by the American alternative rock band Pearl Jam, culled from performances from the North American legs of the band's 2000 Binaural Tour. It was released on VHS and DVD on May 1, 2001.

== Overview ==
DVD extras include a montage of the band's European tour (set to "Yellow Ledbetter"), a montage of outtakes of the band (set to "Smile"), and the Matt Cam feature with which you can watch selected songs from the camera focused on drummer Matt Cameron. In addition, it has three unreleased instrumentals ("Thunderclap", "Foldback", and "Harmony") and the videos for "Do the Evolution" and "Oceans", the latter of which had never been released in the U.S. AllMusic gave it four and a half out of a possible five stars. Allmusic staff writer JT Griffith called it "one of the first truly essential music DVDs." Touring Band 2000 has been certified platinum by the RIAA.

== Track listing ==
Information taken from various sources.

1. "Long Road"
  - 10/21/00, Desert Sky Pavilion, Phoenix, Arizona
2. "Corduroy"
  - 9/4/00, Merriweather Post Pavilion, Columbia, Maryland
3. "Grievance"
  - 10/15/00, Cynthia Woods Mitchell Pavilion, The Woodlands, Texas
4. "Animal"
  - 10/28/00, Blockbuster Pavilion, Devore, California
5. "Gods' Dice"
  - 10/31/00, Shoreline Amphitheatre, Mountain View, California
6. "Evacuation"
  - 8/12/00, Ice Palace, Tampa, Florida
7. "Given to Fly"
  - 10/11/00, Riverport Amphitheater, Maryland Heights, Missouri
8. "Dissident"
  - 10/8/00, Alpine Valley Music Theatre, East Troy, Wisconsin
9. "Nothing as It Seems"
  - 11/6/00, KeyArena, Seattle
10. "Even Flow"
  - 9/1/00, Blockbuster Music Entertainment Centre, Camden, New Jersey
11. "Lukin"
  - 10/24/00, Greek Theatre, Los Angeles
12. "Not for You"
  - 10/24/00, Greek Theatre, Los Angeles
13. "Daughter"/"It's OK"
  - 8/24/00, Jones Beach Amphitheater, Wantagh, New York
14. "Untitled"
  - 10/22/00, MGM Grand Arena, Las Vegas
15. "MFC"
  - 10/22/00, MGM Grand Arena, Las Vegas
16. "Thin Air"
  - 10/21/00, Desert Sky Pavilion, Phoenix, Arizona
17. "Leatherman"
  - 11/6/00, KeyArena, Seattle
18. "Better Man"
  - 11/6/00, KeyArena, Seattle
19. "Nothingman"
  - 11/6/00, KeyArena, Seattle
20. "Insignificance"
  - 10/31/00, Shoreline Amphitheatre, Mountain View, California
21. "I Got Id"
  - 10/4/00, Molson Centre, Montreal, Quebec, Canada
22. "Rearviewmirror"
  - 11/6/00, KeyArena, Seattle
23. "Wishlist"
  - 8/15/00, Pyramid Arena, Memphis, Tennessee
24. "Jeremy"
  - 10/25/00, San Diego Sports Arena, San Diego
25. "Do the Evolution"
  - 10/28/00, Blockbuster Pavilion, Devore, California
26. "Go"
  - 11/3/00, Idaho Center, Nampa, Idaho
27. "Parting Ways"
  - 10/18/00, United Spirit Arena, Lubbock, Texas
28. "Rockin' in the Free World"
  - 10/20/00, Mesa Del Sol Amphitheatre, Albuquerque, New Mexico
- The end credits are set to "Leaving Here" taken from 6/12/00, Pinkpop, Landgraaf, Netherlands.

=== Bonus features ===
- Europe Montages
  - "The Cities" (Set to "Thunderclap")
  - "The Band" (Set to "Foldback" and "Harmony")
  - "The Fans" (Set to "Yellow Ledbetter" taken from 6/26/00, Alsterdorfer Sporthalle, Hamburg, Germany)
- "Smile" (Audio taken from 8/25/00, Jones Beach Amphitheater, Wantagh, New York, with montage of outtakes of the band)
- Bonus Videos
  - "Oceans" video (Never before released in the U.S.)
  - "Do the Evolution" video

=== Matt Cam songs ===
- "Evacuation"
  - 8/12/00, Ice Palace, Tampa, Florida
- "Even Flow"
  - 9/1/00, Blockbuster Music Entertainment Centre, Camden, New Jersey
- "In My Tree"
  - 8/30/00, Tweeter Center Boston, Mansfield, Massachusetts

== Personnel ==
Pearl Jam

- Jeff Ament – bass guitar, backing vocals (1, 5, 15, 20, 25, 28, "Leaving Here" and "In My Tree")
- Matt Cameron – drums, backing vocals (on "Evacuation", "Leatherman" and "Smile")
- Stone Gossard – guitar, backing vocals (1, 6, 15, 16, 18, 20, 22, 25, 28, "Leaving Here" and "In My Tree")
- Mike McCready – guitar
- Eddie Vedder – vocals, guitar, harmonica (on "Smile")

Production

- Liz Burns, Kevin Shuss – filming
- John Burton – engineering
- Brett Eliason – recording and mixing
- Steve Gordon – filming, editing
- Ted Jensen – mastering
- Todd McFarlane – animation on "Do the Evolution" video
- Josh Taft – direction on "Oceans" video

== Chart positions ==
Chart (2001)	Position
US Top Music Videos	1
