= 2/23/03 – Perth, Australia =

Live album by Pearl Jam
- Released: June 10, 2003
- Recorded: February 23, 2003, Burswood Dome, Perth, Western Australia
- Genre: Alternative rock
- Length: 126:39
- Language: English
- Label: Epic

Pearl Jam chronology
2/20/03 – Melbourne, Australia (2003)	2/23/03 – Perth, Australia (2003)	2/28/03 – Sendai, Japan (2003)

Professional ratings
Review scores
Source	Rating
Allmusic	2/5 stars

2/23/03 – Perth, Australia is a two-disc live album by the American alternative rock band Pearl Jam. It was released to retail stores on June 10, 2003.

== Overview ==
The album was recorded live at the Burswood Dome in Perth, Western Australia on February 23, 2003. It was the only official bootleg that Pearl Jam released in stores from the Australian leg of its Riot Act Tour, and it was one of six official bootlegs released overall to retail stores. Allmusic gave it two out of a possible five stars. Allmusic staff writer Jason Birchmeier said, "Of the couple live recordings that Pearl Jam released to retail outlets in 2003, the final show of the band's Australian tour...is probably the least interesting." A video recording of "Throw Your Arms Around Me" from this show appears as a bonus feature on the band's Live at the Garden DVD.

== Track listing ==
=== Disc one ===
1. "Long Road" (Eddie Vedder) – 5:56
2. "Save You" (Jeff Ament, Matt Cameron, Stone Gossard, Mike McCready, Vedder) – 3:55
3. "Gods' Dice" (Ament) – 2:21
4. "Corduroy" (Dave Abbruzzese, Ament, Gossard, McCready, Vedder) – 5:39
5. "Given to Fly" (McCready, Vedder) – 3:47
6. "Even Flow" (Vedder, Gossard) – 6:37
7. "Get Right" (Cameron) – 2:43
8. "Cropduster" (Cameron, Vedder) – 4:02
9. "Jeremy" (Vedder, Ament) – 5:40
10. "Elderly Woman Behind the Counter in a Small Town" (Abbruzzese, Ament, Gossard, McCready, Vedder) – 3:34
11. "I Am Mine" (Vedder) – 4:00
12. "Love Boat Captain" (Boom Gaspar, Vedder) – 5:32
13. "MFC" (Vedder) – 2:24
14. "Improv" – 2:35
15. "Habit" (Vedder) – 3:54

=== Disc two ===
1. "You Are" (Cameron, Vedder) – 4:44
2. "Wishlist" (Vedder) – 4:52
3. "1/2 Full" (Ament, Vedder) – 5:04
4. "Insignificance" (Vedder) – 4:25
5. "Go" (Abbruzzese, Ament, Gossard, McCready, Vedder) – 3:15
6. "Encore Break" – 2:23
7. "Do the Evolution" (Gossard, Vedder) – 4:02
8. "Better Man" (Vedder) – 4:25
9. "Daughter" (Abbruzzese, Ament, Gossard, McCready, Vedder) – 6:51
10. "Crazy Mary" (Victoria Williams) – 6:58
11. "Encore Break" – 1:26
12. "Throw Your Arms Around Me" (Mark Seymour) (with Mark Seymour) – 4:45
13. "Alive" (Vedder, Gossard) – 5:52
14. "Fortunate Son" (John Fogerty) (with Johnny Marr) – 4:58

== Personnel ==
Pearl Jam

- Jeff Ament – bass guitar, design concept
- Matt Cameron – drums
- Stone Gossard – guitars
- Mike McCready – guitars
- Eddie Vedder – vocals, guitars

Additional musicians and production

- Ed Brooks at RFI CD Mastering – mastering
- John Burton – engineering
- Brett Eliason – mixing
- Boom Gaspar – Hammond B3, Fender Rhodes
- Brad Klausen – design and layout
- Johnny Marr – guitar on "Fortunate Son"
- Mark Seymour – vocals and guitar on "Throw Your Arms Around Me"

== Chart positions ==
Chart (2003)	Position
Australian Albums Chart	34
