= 8/24/00 – Jones Beach, New York =

Live album by Pearl Jam
- Released: February 27, 2001
- Recorded: August 24, 2000, Jones Beach Amphitheater, Wantagh, New York, United States
- Genre: Alternative rock
- Length: 122:10
- Language: English
- Label: Epic

Pearl Jam chronology
8/23/00 – Jones Beach, New York (2001)	8/24/00 – Jones Beach, New York (2001)	8/25/00 – Jones Beach, New York (2001)

Professional ratings
Review scores
Source	Rating
AllMusic	1.5/5 stars

8/24/00 – Jones Beach, New York is a two-disc live album and the fortieth in a series of 72 live bootlegs released by the American alternative rock band Pearl Jam from the band's 2000 Binaural Tour. It was released along with the other official bootlegs from the first North American leg of the tour on February 27, 2001.

== Overview ==
The album was recorded on August 24, 2000 in Wantagh, New York at Jones Beach Amphitheater. It was selected by the band as one of 18 "Ape/Man" shows from the tour, which, according to bassist Jeff Ament, were shows the band found "really exciting." AllMusic gave it one and a half out of a possible five stars. Allmusic staff writer Zac Johnson said, "The last quarter of the show really shines, but doesn't fully make up for the mistakes made during the majority of the concert." "Daughter"/"It's OK" from this show appears on the Touring Band 2000 DVD.

== Track listing ==
=== Disc one ===
1. "Of the Girl" (Stone Gossard) – 4:57
2. "Breakerfall" (Eddie Vedder) – 2:38
3. "Corduroy" (Dave Abbruzzese, Jeff Ament, Gossard, Mike McCready, Vedder) – 4:27
4. "Grievance" (Vedder) – 3:12
5. "Last Exit" (Abbruzzese, Ament, Gossard, McCready, Vedder) – 2:35
6. "Do the Evolution" (Gossard, Vedder) – 3:43
7. "Dissident" (Abbruzzese, Ament, Gossard, McCready, Vedder) – 5:07
8. "Rival" (Gossard) – 3:18
9. "Given to Fly" (McCready, Vedder) – 3:53
10. "Nothing as It Seems" (Ament) – 5:34
11. "Light Years" (Gossard, McCready, Vedder) – 4:51
12. "Even Flow" (Vedder, Gossard) – 5:24
13. "Daughter" (Abbruzzese, Ament, Gossard, McCready, Vedder) – 7:07
14. "Lukin" (Vedder) – 0:58
15. "Insignificance" (Vedder) – 4:36
16. "Betterman" (Vedder) – 4:35
17. "Porch" (Vedder) – 4:47

=== Disc two ===
1. "Encore Break" – 0:51
2. "Spin the Black Circle" (Abbruzzese, Ament, Gossard, McCready, Vedder) – 2:40
3. "Hail, Hail" (Gossard, Vedder, Ament, McCready) – 3:29
4. "I Got Id" (Vedder) – 4:38
5. "Elderly Woman Behind the Counter in a Small Town" (Abbruzzese, Ament, Gossard, McCready, Vedder) – 4:51
6. "Crazy Mary" (Victoria Williams) – 5:00
7. "Black" (Vedder, Gossard) – 7:26
8. "Rearviewmirror" (Abbruzzese, Ament, Gossard, McCready, Vedder) – 8:58
9. "Last Kiss" (Wayne Cochran) – 5:03
10. "Yellow Ledbetter" (Ament, McCready, Vedder) – 7:32

== Personnel ==
Pearl Jam

- Jeff Ament – bass guitar, design concept
- Matt Cameron – drums
- Stone Gossard – guitars
- Mike McCready – guitars
- Eddie Vedder – vocals, guitars

Production

- John Burton – engineering
- Brett Eliason – mixing
- Brad Klausen – design and layout
