= Pearl Jam Official Bootlegs =

Ongoing live album series by Pearl Jam

Pearl Jam official bootlegs
- The cover of the first release in the collection, #1 of the 2000 series, May 23, 2000, in Lisbon, Portugal

Live album series by Pearl Jam
- Released: 2000–present
- Recorded: 2000–present
- Genres: Alternative rock, grunge

See full list in Category:Pearl Jam Official Bootlegs.

The Pearl Jam "official" bootlegs are a large, continually growing series of live albums by the American alternative rock band Pearl Jam. Pearl Jam noted the desire of fans to own a copy of the shows they attended and the popularity of bootleg recordings. They had been open in the past about allowing fans to make amateur recordings, and these "official bootlegs" were an attempt to provide a more affordable and better quality product. The official bootlegs are a complete record of almost every show the band plays, excluding club "warm-up" dates.

"The Official Bootlegs series is them working outside the system… That's revolutionary. They're geniuses, I'm telling you… I've spent way too much money on Official Bootlegs, but the [2010] Hyde Park show when we supported them is my favourite, mainly because Eddie [Vedder, singer] dedicates 'State of Love and Trust' to me… Pearl Jam are good enough to justify that many bootlegs. They vary their set pretty extremely from night to night… You get different versions of songs, compare them, see how a tour went. Maybe it started off a little rough and it got awesome in the end." – Brian Fallon, singer, The Gaslight Anthem

As of 2008, the band had sold more than 3.5 million copies of shows since launching the bootleg series in 2000.

== 2000–2001 ==
Pearl Jam's official bootleg program was begun for the band's 2000 Binaural Tour. 72 of the "bootlegs" were released to stores in three waves in late 2000 and early 2001, with the 25 European bootlegs coming first. Every show was released in a cardboard sleeve containing two CDs, with the exception of the 72nd and final show on the tour, November 6, 2000, at KeyArena in Seattle, Washington. The Seattle show was released as a triple-disc set, and was the highest-charting of the series, peaking at number 98 on the Billboard 200, and was called an "essential live document" by Allmusic. Eighteen shows from the tour were chosen by the band as "Ape/Man" shows, which, according to bassist Jeff Ament, were shows the band found "really exciting." With the release of these official bootlegs, Pearl Jam would set a record for most albums to debut in the Billboard 200 at the same time.

=== 2000 official bootlegs ===
- * Asterisk denotes Ape/Man shows

Europe Bootlegs
Released: September 26, 2000

- 1 5/23/00, Estádio do Restelo, Lisbon, Portugal
- 2 5/25/00, Palau Sant Jordi, Barcelona, Spain (Catalonia)
- 3 5/26/00, Velodromo de Anoeta, San Sebastian, Spain (Basque Country)
- 4 5/29/00, Wembley Arena, London, England
- 5 5/30/00, Wembley Arena, London, England^{[*]}
- 6 6/1/00, The Point Theatre, Dublin, Ireland
- 7 6/3/00, SECC, Glasgow, Scotland
- 8 6/4/00, Manchester Evening News Arena, Manchester, England
- 9 6/6/00, Cardiff International Arena, Cardiff, Wales^{[*]}
- 10 6/8/00, Palais Omnisports de Paris-Bercy, Paris, France^{[*]}
- 11 6/9/00, Rock am Ring, Nürburg, Germany
- 12 6/11/00, Rock im Park, Nuremberg, Germany
- 13 6/12/00, Pinkpop, Landgraaf, Netherlands
- 14 6/14/00, Paegas Arena, Prague, Czech Republic
- 15 6/15/00, Spodek, Katowice, Poland
- 16 6/16/00, Spodek, Katowice, Poland^{[*]}
- 17 6/18/00, Residenzplatz, Salzburg, Austria
- 18 6/19/00, Hala Tivoli, Ljubljana, Slovenia
- 19 6/20/00, Arena di Verona, Verona, Italy^{[*]}
- 20 6/22/00, FILA Forum Arena, Milan, Italy^{[*]}
- 21 6/23/00, Hallenstadion, Zurich, Switzerland
- 22 6/25/00, Wuhlheide, Berlin, Germany
- 23 6/26/00, Alsterdorfer Sporthalle, Hamburg, Germany
- 24 6/28/00, Sjöhistoriska Museet, Stockholm, Sweden
- 25 6/29/00, Spektrum, Oslo, Norway

North America Leg 1 Bootlegs
Released: February 27, 2001

- 26 8/3/00, GTE Virginia Beach Amphitheater, Virginia Beach, Virginia
- 27 8/4/00, Blockbuster Pavilion, Charlotte, North Carolina
- 28 8/6/00, Greensboro Coliseum, Greensboro, North Carolina
- 29 8/7/00, Philips Arena, Atlanta, Georgia^{[*]}
- 30 8/9/00, Mars Music Amphitheatre, West Palm Beach, Florida
- 31 8/10/00, Mars Music Amphitheatre, West Palm Beach, Florida
- 32 8/12/00, Ice Palace, Tampa, Florida^{[*]}
- 33 8/14/00, New Orleans Arena, New Orleans, Louisiana
- 34 8/15/00, Pyramid Arena, Memphis, Tennessee
- 35 8/17/00, AmSouth Amphitheater, Antioch, Tennessee
- 36 8/18/00, Deer Creek Music Center, Noblesville, Indiana
- 37 8/20/00, Riverbend Music Center, Cincinnati, Ohio
- 38 8/21/00, Polaris Amphitheater, Columbus, Ohio^{[*]}
- 39 8/23/00, Jones Beach Amphitheater, Wantagh, New York
- 40 8/24/00, Jones Beach Amphitheater, Wantagh, New York^{[*]}
- 41 8/25/00, Jones Beach Amphitheater, Wantagh, New York^{[*]}
- 42 8/27/00, Saratoga Performing Arts Center, Saratoga Springs, New York
- 43 8/29/00, Tweeter Center Boston, Mansfield, Massachusetts^{[*]}
- 44 8/30/00, Tweeter Center Boston, Mansfield, Massachusetts
- 45 9/1/00, Philadelphia, Pennsylvania
- 46 9/2/00, Blockbuster Music Entertainment Centre, Camden, New Jersey
- 47 9/4/00, Merriweather Post Pavilion, Columbia, Maryland
- 48 9/5/00, Post-Gazette Pavilion, Pittsburgh, Pennsylvania

North America Leg 2 Bootlegs
Released: March 27, 2001

- 49 10/4/00, Molson Centre, Montreal, Quebec, Canada
- 50 10/5/00, Air Canada Centre, Toronto, Ontario, Canada
- 51 10/7/00, The Palace of Auburn Hills, Auburn Hills, Michigan^{[*]}
- 52 10/8/00, Alpine Valley Music Theatre, East Troy, Wisconsin
- 53 10/9/00, Allstate Arena, Rosemont, Illinois^{[*]}
- 54 10/11/00, Riverport Amphitheater, Maryland Heights, Missouri
- 55 10/12/00, Sandstone Amphitheater, Bonner Springs, Kansas
- 56 10/14/00, Cynthia Woods Mitchell Pavilion, The Woodlands, Texas
- 57 10/15/00, Cynthia Woods Mitchell Pavilion, The Woodlands, Texas
- 58 10/17/00, Smirnoff Music Centre, Dallas, Texas
- 59 10/18/00, United Spirit Arena, Lubbock, Texas
- 60 10/20/00, Mesa Del Sol Amphitheatre, Albuquerque, New Mexico
- 61 10/21/00, Desert Sky Pavilion, Phoenix, Arizona
- 62 10/22/00, MGM Grand Arena, Las Vegas, Nevada^{[*]}
- 63 10/24/00, Greek Theatre, Los Angeles, California
- 64 10/25/00, San Diego Sports Arena, San Diego, California^{[*]}
- 65 10/27/00, Selland Arena, Fresno, California
- 66 10/28/00, Blockbuster Pavilion, Devore, California
- 67 10/30/00, Sacramento Valley Amphitheater, Marysville, California
- 68 10/31/00, Shoreline Amphitheatre, Mountain View, California
- 69 11/2/00, Rose Garden Arena, Portland, Oregon
- 70 11/3/00, Idaho Center, Nampa, Idaho^{[*]}
- 71 11/5/00, KeyArena, Seattle, Washington
- 72 11/6/00, KeyArena, Seattle, Washington^{[*]}

=== Chart positions ===
Year	Album	Chart positions										
Year	Album	US	AUS	AUT	BEL	FRA	IRE	NLD	NOR	SWE	SWI	UK
2000	5/29/00, Wembley Arena, London, England	—	—	—	—	—	—	—	—	—	—	140
2000	5/30/00, Wembley Arena, London, England	137	—	—	50	—	—	—	—	—	—	172
2000	6/1/00, The Point Theatre, Dublin, Ireland	—	—	—	—	—	18	—	—	—	—	—
2000	6/4/00, Manchester Evening News Arena, Manchester, England	—	—	—	—	—	—	—	—	—	—	174
2000	6/8/00, Palais Omnisports de Paris-Bercy, Paris, France	—	—	—	—	56	—	—	—	—	—	—
2000	6/12/00, Pinkpop, Landgraaf, Netherlands	—	—	—	—	—	—	63	—	—	—	—
2000	6/16/00, Spodek, Katowice, Poland	103	—	—	—	—	—	—	—	—	—	—
2000	6/18/00, Residenzplatz, Salzburg, Austria	—	—	17	—	—	—	—	—	—	—	—
2000	6/20/00, Arena di Verona, Verona, Italy	134	46	—	—	—	—	—	—	—	—	—
2000	6/22/00, FILA Forum Arena, Milan, Italy	125	—	—	—	—	—	—	—	—	—	—
2000	6/23/00, Hallenstadion, Zurich, Switzerland	—	—	—	—	—	—	—	—	—	46	—
2000	6/26/00, Alsterdorfer Sporthalle, Hamburg, Germany	175	—	—	—	—	—	—	—	—	—	—
2000	6/28/00, Vasa Museum, Stockholm, Sweden	—	—	—	—	—	—	—	—	50	—	—
2000	6/29/00, Spektrum, Oslo, Norway	—	—	—	—	—	—	—	14	—	—	—
2001	8/12/00, Ice Palace, Tampa, Florida	181	—	—	—	—	—	—	—	—	—	—
2001	8/15/00, Pyramid Arena, Memphis, Tennessee	191	—	—	—	—	—	—	—	—	—	—
2001	8/18/00, Deer Creek Music Center, Noblesville, Indiana	174	—	—	—	—	—	—	—	—	—	—
2001	8/25/00, Jones Beach Amphitheater, Wantagh, New York	159	—	—	—	—	—	—	—	—	—	—
2001	8/29/00, Tweeter Center Boston, Mansfield, Massachusetts	163	—	—	—	—	—	—	—	—	—	—
2001	9/1/00, Blockbuster Music Entertainment Centre, Camden, New Jersey	179	—	—	—	—	—	—	—	—	—	—
2001	9/5/00, Post-Gazette Pavilion, Burgettstown, Pennsylvania	176	—	—	—	—	—	—	—	—	—	—
2001	10/22/00, MGM Grand Arena, Las Vegas, Nevada	152	—	—	—	—	—	—	—	—	—	—
2001	11/6/00, KeyArena, Seattle, Washington	98	—	—	—	—	—	—	—	—	—	—

== 2003 ==
The cover of #37 in the 2003 bootleg series, May 3, 2003, in State College, Pennsylvania

The CDs continued for the 2003 Riot Act Tour, but they were not available in stores at first. They had to be ordered through the band's official website, and were mailed out. The bootlegs were made available within a week of each show date. After each leg of the tour, however, certain standout shows were released in stores: February 23, 2003, in Perth, Australia; March 3, 2003, in Tokyo, Japan; May 3, 2003, in State College, Pennsylvania; July 8, 2003, and July 9, 2003, in New York City; and July 11, 2003, in Mansfield, Massachusetts. The State College show was a three-hour, triple disc show, which vocalist Eddie Vedder vowed to make "the longest Pearl Jam show ever played." It was surpassed by the Mansfield show, from the Tweeter Center Boston, in which the band played 45 songs, including an acoustic set. The New York shows, from Madison Square Garden, were released both separately and as a boxed set. The July 8, 2003 show was also released as the Live at the Garden DVD. In 2004, Pearl Jam released Live at Benaroya Hall, and while it came in similar packaging to the bootlegs, it is not considered to be part of the series.

=== 2003 official bootlegs ===
* denotes a bootleg released to retail stores on June 10, 2003
** denotes a bootleg released to retail stores on July 15, 2003
*** denotes a bootleg released to retail stores on September 16, 2003
**** denotes a bootleg released as a special edition to retail stores only in Mexico

Note: Number 53 in the series was to have been the band's show at the Riverbend Music Center in Cincinnati, Ohio, however the show was cancelled.

Australia/Japan Bootlegs

- 1 2/8/03, Brisbane Entertainment Centre, Brisbane, Australia
- 2 2/9/03, Brisbane Entertainment Centre, Brisbane, Australia
- 3 2/11/03, Sydney Entertainment Centre, Sydney, Australia
- 4 2/13/03, Sydney Entertainment Centre, Sydney, Australia
- 5 2/14/03, Sydney Entertainment Centre, Sydney, Australia
- 6 2/16/03, Adelaide Entertainment Centre, Adelaide, Australia
- 7 2/18/03, Rod Laver Arena, Melbourne, Australia
- 8 2/19/03, Rod Laver Arena, Melbourne, Australia
- 9 2/20/03, Rod Laver Arena, Melbourne, Australia
- 10 2/23/03, Burswood Dome, Perth, Australia^{[*]}
- 11 2/28/03, Izumity 21, Sendai, Japan
- 12 3/1/03, Pacifico Yokohama, Yokohama, Japan
- 13 3/3/03, Nippon Budokan, Tokyo, Japan^{[*]}
- 14 3/4/03, Kosei Nenkin Kaika, Osaka, Japan
- 15 3/6/03, Nagoyashi Kokaido, Nagoya, Japan

North America Leg 1 Bootlegs

- 16 4/1/03, Pepsi Center, Denver, Colorado
- 17 4/3/03, Ford Center, Oklahoma City, Oklahoma
- 18 4/5/03, Verizon Wireless Amphitheater, San Antonio, Texas
- 19 4/6/03, Cynthia Woods Mitchell Pavilion, The Woodlands, Texas
- 20 4/8/03, UNO Lakefront Arena, New Orleans, Louisiana
- 21 4/9/03, Oak Mountain Amphitheater, Pelham, Alabama
- 22 4/11/03, Sound Advice Amphitheater, West Palm Beach, Florida
- 23 4/13/03, St. Pete Times Forum, Tampa, Florida
- 24 4/15/03, Alltel Pavilion at Walnut Creek, Raleigh, North Carolina
- 25 4/16/03, Verizon Wireless Amphitheater, Charlotte, North Carolina
- 26 4/18/03, AmSouth Amphitheater, Antioch, Tennessee
- 27 4/19/03, HiFi Buys Amphitheatre, Atlanta, Georgia
- 28 4/21/03, Rupp Arena, Lexington, Kentucky
- 29 4/22/03, Savvis Center, St. Louis, Missouri
- 30 4/23/03, Assembly Hall, Champaign, Illinois
- 31 4/25/03, Gund Arena, Cleveland, Ohio
- 32 4/26/03, Mellon Arena, Pittsburgh, Pennsylvania
- 33 4/28/03, First Union Spectrum, Philadelphia, Pennsylvania
- 34 4/29/03, Pepsi Arena, Albany, New York
- 35 4/30/03, Nassau Coliseum, Uniondale, New York
- 36 5/2/03, HSBC Arena, Buffalo, New York
- 37 5/3/03, Bryce Jordan Center, University Park, Pennsylvania^{[**]}

North America Leg 2 Bootlegs

- 38 5/28/03, Adams Fieldhouse, University of Montana-Missoula, Missoula, Montana
- 39 5/30/03, GM Place, Vancouver, British Columbia, Canada
- 40 6/1/03, Shoreline Amphitheatre, Mountain View, California
- 41 6/2/03, Verizon Wireless Amphitheatre, Irvine, California
- 42 6/3/03, Verizon Wireless Amphitheatre, Irvine, California
- 43 6/5/03, San Diego Sports Arena, San Diego, California
- 44 6/6/03, MGM Grand Arena, Las Vegas, Nevada
- 45 6/7/03, Cricket Pavilion, Phoenix, Arizona
- 46 6/9/03, Smirnoff Music Centre, Dallas, Texas
- 47 6/10/03, Alltel Arena, Little Rock, Arkansas
- 48 6/12/03, Verizon Wireless Amphitheater, Bonner Springs, Kansas
- 49 6/13/03, Mid-America Center, Council Bluffs, Iowa
- 50 6/15/03, Fargodome, Fargo, North Dakota
- 51 6/16/03, Xcel Energy Center, Saint Paul, Minnesota
- 52 6/18/03, United Center, Chicago, Illinois
- 54 6/21/03, Alpine Valley Music Theater, East Troy, Wisconsin
- 55 6/22/03, Verizon Wireless Music Center, Noblesville, Indiana
- 56 6/24/03, Polaris Amphitheater, Columbus, Ohio
- 57 6/25/03, DTE Energy Music Theatre, Clarkston, Michigan
- 58 6/26/03, DTE Energy Music Theatre, Clarkston, Michigan
- 59 6/28/03, Molson Amphitheatre, Toronto, Ontario, Canada
- 60 6/29/03, Bell Centre, Montreal, Quebec, Canada
- 61 7/1/03, Nissan Pavilion, Bristow, Virginia
- 62 7/2/03, Tweeter Center Boston, Mansfield, Massachusetts
- 63 7/3/03, Tweeter Center Boston, Mansfield, Massachusetts
- 64 7/5/03, Tweeter Center at the Waterfront, Camden, New Jersey
- 65 7/6/03, Tweeter Center at the Waterfront, Camden, New Jersey
- 66 7/8/03, Madison Square Garden, New York, New York^{[***]}
- 67 7/9/03, Madison Square Garden, New York, New York^{[***]}
- 68 7/11/03, Tweeter Center, Mansfield, Massachusetts^{[***]}
- 69 7/12/03, Hersheypark Stadium, Hershey, Pennsylvania
- 70 7/14/03, PNC Bank Arts Center, Holmdel, New Jersey
- 71 7/17/03, Palacio de los Deportes, Mexico City, Mexico^{[****]}
- 72 7/18/03, Palacio de los Deportes, Mexico City, Mexico
- 73 7/19/03, Palacio de los Deportes, Mexico City, Mexico

=== Chart positions ===
Year	Album	Chart positions	
Year	Album	US	AUS
2003	2/23/03, Burswood Dome, Perth, Australia	—	34
2003	3/3/03, Nippon Budokan, Tokyo, Japan	182	—
2003	5/3/03, Bryce Jordan Center, University Park, Pennsylvania	169	—

== 2005–2006 ==
Pearl Jam took a year-long touring break until the 2004 Vote for Change tour, but the band elected not to release bootlegs for the six shows from that tour. The band took yet another year off until a fall 2005 tour of Canada and South America. For the first time, the bootlegs were MP3-only, again only available through the band's official website. The music downloads were accompanied by pictures from individual shows. The MP3-only format expanded to include lossless FLAC format for the band's 2006 summer tour for its self-titled eighth album. The digital bootlegs were typically made available within 2–3 days of each show date. The bootlegs were available through the band's official download website, which has since been discontinued.

=== 2005 official bootlegs ===
North America bootlegs

- 1 9/1/05, The Gorge, George, Washington
- 2 9/2/05, General Motors Place, Vancouver, British Columbia, Canada
- 3 9/4/05, Pengrowth Saddledome, Calgary, Alberta, Canada
- 4 9/5/05, Rexall Place, Edmonton, Alberta, Canada
- 5 9/7/05, Credit Union Centre, Saskatoon, Saskatchewan, Canada
- 6 9/8/05, MTS Centre, Winnipeg, Manitoba, Canada
- 7 9/9/05, Fort William Gardens, Thunder Bay, Ontario, Canada
- 8 9/11/05, Memorial Auditorium, Kitchener, Ontario, Canada
- 9 9/12/05, John Labatt Centre, London, Ontario, Canada
- 10 9/13/05, Copps Coliseum, Hamilton, Ontario, Canada
- 11 9/15/05, Bell Centre, Montreal, Quebec, Canada
- 12 9/16/05, Corel Centre, Ottawa, Ontario, Canada
- 13 9/19/05, Air Canada Centre, Toronto, Ontario, Canada
- 14 9/20/05, Colisee Pepsi Arena, Quebec City, Quebec, Canada
- 15 9/22/05, Metro Centre, Halifax, Nova Scotia, Canada
- 16 9/24/05, Mile One Stadium, St. John's, Newfoundland, Canada
- 17 9/25/05, Mile One Stadium, St. John's, Newfoundland, Canada
- 18 9/30/05, Borgata Events Center, Atlantic City, New Jersey
- 19 10/1/05, Borgata Events Center, Atlantic City, New Jersey
- 20 10/3/05, Wachovia Center, Philadelphia, Pennsylvania

Latin America bootlegs

- 21 11/22/05, Estadio San Carlos de Apoquindo, Santiago, Chile
- 22 11/23/05, Estadio San Carlos de Apoquindo, Santiago, Chile
- 23 11/25/05, Ferrocarril Oeste Stadium, Buenos Aires, Argentina
- 24 11/26/05, Ferrocarril Oeste Stadium, Buenos Aires, Argentina
- 25 11/28/05, Gigantinho Gymnasium, Porto Alegre, Brazil
- 26 11/30/05, Pedreira Paulo Leminski, Curitiba, Brazil
- 27 12/2/05, Pacaembu, São Paulo, Brazil
- 28 12/3/05, Pacaembu, São Paulo, Brazil
- 29 12/4/05, Apoteose, Rio De Janeiro, Brazil
- 30 12/7/05, Auditorio Coca Cola, Monterrey, Mexico
- 31 12/9/05, Palacio de los Deportes, Mexico City, Mexico
- 32 12/10/05, Palacio de los Deportes, Mexico City, Mexico

=== 2006 official bootlegs ===
North America Leg 1 bootlegs

- 1 5/9/06, Air Canada Centre, Toronto, Ontario, Canada
- 2 5/10/06, Air Canada Centre, Toronto, Ontario, Canada
- 3 5/12/06, Pepsi Arena, Albany, New York
- 4 5/13/06, New England Dodge Music Arena, Hartford, Connecticut
- 5 5/16/06, United Center, Chicago, Illinois
- 6 5/17/06, United Center, Chicago, Illinois
- 7 5/19/06, Van Andel Arena, Grand Rapids, Michigan
- 8 5/20/06, Quicken Loans Arena, Cleveland, Ohio
- 9 5/22/06, Palace of Auburn Hills, Detroit, Michigan
- 10 5/24/06, TD Banknorth Garden, Boston, Massachusetts
- 11 5/25/06, TD Banknorth Garden, Boston, Massachusetts
- 12 5/27/06, Tweeter Waterfront, Camden, New Jersey
- 13 5/28/06, Tweeter Waterfront, Camden, New Jersey
- 14 5/30/06, MCI Center, Washington, D.C.
- 15 6/1/06, Continental Airlines Arena, East Rutherford, New Jersey
- 16 6/3/06, Continental Airlines Arena, East Rutherford, New Jersey

North America Leg 2 bootlegs

- 17 6/23/06, Mellon Arena, Pittsburgh, Pennsylvania
- 18 6/24/06, US Bank Arena, Cincinnati, Ohio
- 19 6/26/06, Xcel Energy Center, Saint Paul, Minnesota
- 20 6/27/06, Xcel Energy Center, Saint Paul, Minnesota
- 21 6/29/06, Marcus Amphitheatre, Milwaukee, Wisconsin
- 22 6/30/06, Marcus Amphitheatre, Milwaukee, Wisconsin
- 23 7/2/06, Pepsi Center, Denver, Colorado
- 24 7/3/06, Pepsi Center, Denver, Colorado
- 25 7/6/06, MGM Grand, Las Vegas, Nevada
- 26 7/7/06, Cox Arena, San Diego, California
- 27 7/9/06, The Forum, Inglewood, California
- 28 7/10/06, The Forum, Inglewood, California
- 29 7/13/06, Santa Barbara Bowl, Santa Barbara, California
- 30 7/15/06, Bill Graham Civic Auditorium, San Francisco, California
- 31 7/16/06, Bill Graham Civic Auditorium, San Francisco California
- 32 7/18/06, Bill Graham Civic Auditorium, San Francisco California
- 33 7/20/06, Arlene Schnitzer Concert Hall, Portland, Oregon
- 34 7/22/06, The Gorge Amphitheatre, George, Washington
- 35 7/23/06, The Gorge Amphitheatre, George, Washington

Europe bootlegs

- 36 8/23/06, The Point, Dublin, Ireland
- 37 8/25/06, Leeds Festival, Leeds, England
- 38 8/27/06, Reading Festival, Reading, England
- 39 8/29/06, Gelredome, Arnhem, Netherlands
- 40 8/30/06, Sportpaleis, Antwerp, Belgium
- 41 9/1/06, Pavello Olimpic de Badalona, Barcelona, Spain
- 42 9/2/06, Azkena Rock Festival, Vitoria, Spain
- 43 9/4/06, Pavilhao Atlantico, Lisbon, Portugal
- 44 9/5/06, Pavilhao Atlantico, Lisbon, Portugal
- 45 9/7/06, Palacio de Deportes, Madrid, Spain
- 46 9/9/06, Le Dome de Marseille, Marseille, France
- 47 9/11/06, Bercy, Paris, France
- 48 9/13/06, Bern Arena, Bern, Switzerland
- 49 9/14/06, PalaMalaguti, Bologna, Italy
- 50 9/16/06, Arena di Verona, Verona, Italy
- 51 9/17/06, Forum, Milan, Italy
- 52 9/19/06, Palaisozaki, Torino, Italy
- 53 9/20/06, Duomo Square, Pistoia, Italy
- 54 9/22/06, Sazka Arena, Prague, Czech Republic
- 55 9/23/06, Wuhlheide, Berlin, Germany
- 56 9/25/06, Stadthalle, Vienna, Austria
- 57 9/26/06, Dom Sportova, Zagreb, Croatia
- 58 9/30/06, OAKA Sports Hall, Athens, Greece

Australia/Hawaii bootlegs

- 59 11/7/06, Acer Arena, Sydney, Australia
- 60 11/8/06, Acer Arena, Sydney, Australia
- 61 11/10/06, Entertainment Center, Brisbane, Australia
- 62 11/11/06, Entertainment Center, Brisbane, Australia
- 63 11/13/06, Rod Laver Arena, Melbourne, Australia
- 64 11/14/06, Rod Laver Arena, Melbourne, Australia
- 65 11/16/06, Rod Laver Arena, Melbourne, Australia
- 66 11/18/06, Acer Arena, Sydney, Australia
- 67 11/19/06, Newcastle Entertainment Centre, Newcastle, Australia
- 68 11/21/06, Adelaide Entertainment Centre, Adelaide, Australia
- 69 11/22/06, Adelaide Entertainment Centre, Adelaide, Australia
- 70 11/25/06, Subiaco Oval, Perth, Australia
- 71 12/2/06, Blaisdell Center, Honolulu, Hawaii

=== Online archival releases ===
- 11/30/93, Aladdin Theater, Las Vegas, Nevada

== 2008–2011 ==
The digital image for #16 in the 2009 bootleg series, September 30, 2009, in Universal City, California

The band elected not to release official bootlegs for its 2007 European Tour. Official bootlegs are available for the band's 2008 U.S. Tour through the band's official website in FLAC, MP3, and CD formats. The 2008 bootlegs were released through Kufala Recordings.

Pearl Jam released bootlegs of shows from their 2009–2010 Backspacer Tour exclusively on its website. The bootlegs are available for digital download in MP3 and FLAC format as well as burn-to-order compact disc formats with the CD orders fulfilled by Kufala Records.

=== 2008 official bootlegs ===
- 1 6/11/08, Cruzan Amphitheatre, West Palm Beach, Florida
- 2 6/12/08, St. Pete Times Forum, Tampa, Florida
- 3 6/14/08, Bonnaroo, Manchester, Tennessee
- 4 6/16/08, Colonial Center, Columbia, South Carolina
- 5 6/17/08, Verizon Amphitheatre, Virginia Beach, Virginia
- 6 6/19/08, Susquehanna Bank Center, Camden, New Jersey
- 7 6/20/08, Susquehanna Bank Center, Camden, New Jersey
- 8 6/22/08, Verizon Center, Washington, D.C.
- 9 6/24/08, Madison Square Garden, New York, New York
- 10 6/25/08, Madison Square Garden, New York, New York
- 11 6/27/08, Dodge Amphitheater, Hartford, Connecticut
- 12 6/28/08, Comcast Center, Mansfield, Massachusetts
- 13 6/30/08, Comcast Center, Mansfield, Massachusetts

=== 2009 official bootlegs ===
- 1 8/8/09, Virgin Festival, Calgary, Alberta, Canada
- 2 8/11/09, Shephard’s Bush Empire, London, England
- 3 8/13/09, Sportspaleis Ahoy, Rotterdam, Netherlands
- 4 8/15/09, Wuhlheide, Berlin, Germany
- 5 8/17/09, Manchester Evening News Arena, Manchester, England
- 6 8/18/09, O2 Arena, London, England
- 7 8/21/09, Molson Amphitheatre, Toronto, Ontario, Canada
- 8 8/23/09, United Center, Chicago, Illinois
- 9 8/24/09, United Center, Chicago, Illinois
- 10 8/28/09, Outside Lands Festival, Golden Gate Park, San Francisco, California
- 11 9/21/09, KeyArena, Seattle, Washington
- 12 9/22/09, KeyArena, Seattle, Washington
- 13 9/25/09, GM Place, Vancouver, British Columbia, Canada
- 14 9/26/09, Clark County Amphitheare, Ridgefield, Washington
- 15 9/28/09, E Center, Salt Lake City, Utah
- 16 9/30/09, Gibson Amphitheater, Universal City, California
- 17 10/01/09, Gibson Amphitheater, Universal City, California
- 18 10/04/09, Austin City Limits Music Fest, Austin, Texas
- 19 10/06/09, Gibson Amphitheater, Universal City, California
- 20 10/07/09, Gibson Amphitheater, Universal City, California
- 21 10/09/09, San Diego State University, Viejas Arena, San Diego, California
- 22 10/27/09, Wachovia Spectrum, Philadelphia, Pennsylvania
- 23 10/28/09, Wachovia Spectrum, Philadelphia, Pennsylvania
- 24 10/30/09, Wachovia Spectrum, Philadelphia, Pennsylvania
- 25 10/31/09, Wachovia Spectrum, Philadelphia, Pennsylvania
- 26 11/14/09, Member Equity Stadium, Perth, Australia
- 27 11/17/09, Adelaide Oval, Adelaide, Australia
- 28 11/20/09, Etihad Stadium, Melbourne, Australia
- 29 11/22/09, Sydney Football Stadium, Sydney, Australia
- 30 11/25/09, QSAC Stadium, Brisbane, Australia
- 31 11/27/09, Mt Smart Stadium, Auckland, New Zealand
- 32 11/29/09, AMI Stadium, Christchurch, New Zealand

=== 2010 official bootlegs ===
North America Bootlegs

- 1 5/1/10, New Orleans Jazz and Heritage Festival, New Orleans, Louisiana
- 2 5/3/10, Sprint Center, Kansas City, Missouri
- 3 5/4/10, Scottrade Center, St. Louis, Missouri
- 4 5/6/10, Nationwide Arena, Columbus, Ohio
- 5 5/7/10, Verizon Wireless Amphitheatre Indiana, Noblesville, Indiana
- 6 5/9/10, Quicken Loans Arena, Cleveland, Ohio
- 7 5/10/10, HSBC Arena, Buffalo, New York
- 8 5/13/10, Jiffy Lube Live, Bristow, Virginia
- 9 5/15/10, XL Center, Hartford, Connecticut
- 10 5/17/10, TD Garden, Boston, Massachusetts
- 11 5/18/10, The Prudential Center, Newark, New Jersey
- 12 5/20/10, Madison Square Garden, New York, New York
- 13 5/21/10, Madison Square Garden, New York, New York

Europe Bootlegs

- 14 6/22/10, The 02, Dublin, Ireland
- 15 6/23/10, Odyssey Arena, Belfast, Northern Ireland
- 16 6/25/10, Hyde Park, London, England
- 17 6/27/10, Goffertpark, Nijmegen, Holland
- 18 6/30/10, Wuhlheide, Berlin, Germany
- 19 7/1/10, Heineken Open'er Festival, Gdynia, Poland
- 20 7/3/10, Town Square, Arras, France
- 21 7/4/10, Werchter Festival, Werchter, Belgium
- 22 7/6/10, Heineken Jammin' Festival, Venice, Italy
- 23 7/9/10, BBK Live Festival, Bilbao, Spain
- 24 7/10/10, Alges, Oeiras, Portugal

=== 2011 official bootlegs ===
Canada bootlegs

- 1 9/7/11, Montreal
- 2 9/11/11, Toronto
- 3 9/12/11, Toronto
- 4 9/14/11, Ottawa
- 5 9/15/11, Hamilton
- 6 9/17/11, Winnipeg
- 7 9/19/11, Saskatoon
- 8 9/21/11, Calgary
- 9 9/23/11, Edmonton
- 10 9/25/11, Vancouver

Latin America bootlegs

- 11 11/3/11, Sao Paulo, Brazil
- 12 11/4/11, Sao Paulo, Brazil
- 13 11/6/11, Rio De Janeiro, Brazil
- 14 11/9/11, Curitiba, Brazil
- 15 11/11/11, Porto Alegre, Brazil
- 16 11/13/11, Buenos Aires, Argentina
- 17 11/16/11, Santiago, Chile
- 18 11/18/11, Estadio San Marcos, Lima, Peru
- 19 11/20/11, San Jose, Costa Rica

== 2012–2018 ==
Official bootlegs for the band's 2012 Tour were available through the band's official website in MP3, FLAC, 24-bit/96 kHz FLAC formats, as well as physical compact discs. The CD orders are fulfilled by nugs.net. In addition, ALAC and 24-bit/96 kHz ALAC formats are available on the nugs.net website.

The 2012 bootlegs each premiered one week before their official release on SiriusXM Pearl Jam Radio.

Bootlegs in this format continued to be released on subsequent Pearl Jam tours from 2013 through to 2018.

=== 2012 official bootlegs ===
Europe bootlegs

- 1 6/20/12, Manchester Arena, Manchester, England
- 2 6/21/12, Manchester Arena, Manchester, England
- 3 6/23/12, Isle of Wight Festival, Isle of Wight, England
- 4 6/26/12, Ziggo Dome, Amsterdam, Netherlands
- 5 6/27/12, Ziggo Dome, Amsterdam, Netherlands
- 6 6/29/12, Rock Werchter, Werchter, Belgium
- 7 6/30/12, Main Square Festival, Arras, France
- 8 7/2/12, O2 Arena, Prague, Czech Republic
- 9 7/4/12, O2 World Berlin, Berlin, Germany
- 10 7/5/12, O2 World Berlin, Berlin, Germany
- 11 7/7/12, Ericsson Globe, Stockholm, Sweden
- 12 7/9/12, Spektrum, Oslo, Norway
- 13 7/10/12, Forum, Copenhagen, Denmark

North America bootlegs

- 14 9/21/12, Deluna Festival, Pensacola, Florida
- 15 9/22/12, Music Midtown, Atlanta, Georgia
- 16 9/30/12, Adams Center, Missoula, Montana

=== 2013 official bootlegs ===
South America bootlegs

- 1 3/31/13, Lollapalooza Brazil, Sao Paulo, Brazil
- 2 4/3/13, El Festival Mas Grande, Buenos Aires, Argentina
- 3 4/6/13, Lollapalooza Chile, Santiago, Chile

North America bootlegs

- 4 10/11/13, Consol Energy Center, Pittsburgh, Pennsylvania
- 5 10/12/13, First Niagara Center, Buffalo, New York
- 6 10/15/13, DCU Center, Worcester, Massachusetts
- 7 10/16/13, DCU Center, Worcester, Massachusetts
- 8 10/18/13, Barclays Center, Brooklyn, New York
- 9 10/19/13, Barclays Center, Brooklyn, New York
- 10 10/21/13, Wells Fargo Arena, Philadelphia, Pennsylvania
- 11 10/22/13, Wells Fargo Arena, Philadelphia, Pennsylvania
- 12 10/25/13, XL Center, Hartford, Connecticut
- 13 10/27/13, 1st Mariner Arena, Baltimore, Maryland
- 14 10/29/13, John Paul Jones Arena, Charlottesville, Virginia
- 15 10/30/13, Time Warner Cable Arena, Charlotte, North Carolina
- 16 11/1/13, Voodoo Festival, New Orleans, Louisiana
- 17 11/15/13, American Airlines Center, Dallas, Texas
- 18 11/16/13, Chesapeake Energy Arena, Oklahoma City, Oklahoma
- 19 11/19/13, Jobing.com Arena, Phoenix, Arizona
- 20 11/21/13, Viejas Arena, San Diego, California
- 21 11/23/13, LA Sports Arena, Los Angeles, California
- 22 11/24/13, LA Sports Arena, Los Angeles, California
- 23 11/26/13, Oracle Arena, Oakland, California
- 24 11/29/13, Rose Garden, Portland, Oregon
- 25 11/30/13, Spokane Arena, Spokane, Washington
- 26 12/2/13, Scotiabank Saddledome, Calgary, Alberta, Canada
- 27 12/4/13, Rogers Arena, Vancouver, British Columbia, Canada
- 28 12/6/13, Key Arena, Seattle, Washington

=== 2014 official bootlegs ===
Australia/New Zealand bootlegs

- 1 1/17/14, Big Day Out, Western Springs Stadium, Auckland, New Zealand
- 2 1/19/14, Big Day Out, Metricon Stadium, Gold Coast, Australia
- 3 1/24/14, Big Day Out, Flemington Racecourse, Melbourne, Australia
- 4 1/26/14, Big Day Out, Sydney Fairgrounds, Sydney, Australia
- 5 1/31/14, Big Day Out, Bonython Park, Adelaide, Australia
- 6 2/2/14, Big Day Out, Arena Joondalup, Perth, Australia

Europe bootlegs

- 7 6/16/14, Ziggo Dome, Amsterdam, Netherlands
- 8 6/17/14, Ziggo Dome, Amsterdam, Netherlands
- 9 6/20/14, San Siro Stadium, Milan, Italy
- 10 6/22/14, Nereo Rocco Stadium, Trieste, Italy
- 11 6/25/14, Stadthalle, Vienna, Austria
- 12 6/26/14, Wuhlheide, Berlin, Germany
- 13 6/28/14, Friends Arena, Stockholm, Sweden
- 14 6/29/14, Telenor Arena, Oslo, Norway
- 15 7/3/14, Open'er Festival, Gdynia, Poland
- 16 7/5/14, Rock Werchter Festival, Werchter, Belgium
- 17 7/8/14, First Direct Arena, Leeds, UK
- 18 7/11/14, Milton Keynes Bowl, Milton Keynes, UK

North America bootlegs

- 19 10/1/14, U.S. Bank Arena, Cincinnati, Ohio
- 20 10/3/14, Scottrade Center, St. Louis, Missouri
- 21 10/5/14, Austin City Limits Music Festival, Austin, Texas
- 22 10/8/14, BOK Center, Tulsa, Oklahoma
- 23 10/9/14, Pinnacle Bank Arena, Lincoln, Nebraska
- 24 10/12/14, Austin City Limits Music Festival, Austin, Texas
- 25 10/14/14, FedExForum, Memphis, Tennessee
- 26 10/16/14, Joe Louis Arena, Detroit, Michigan
- 27 10/17/14, iWireless Center, Moline, Illinois (No Code full album show)
- 28 10/19/14, Xcel Energy Center, St. Paul, Minnesota
- 29 10/20/14, BMO Harris Bradley Center, Milwaukee, Wisconsin (Yield full album show)
- 30 10/22/14, Pepsi Center, Denver, Colorado

=== 2015 official bootlegs ===
Latin America bootlegs

- 1 11/4/2015, Estadio Nacional, Santiago, Chile
- 2 11/7/2015, Estadio Ciudad de La Plata, La Plata, Argentine
- 3 11/11/2015, Arena do Grêmio, Porto Alegre, Brazil
- 4 11/14/2015, Estadio do Morumbi, Sao Paulo, Brazil
- 5 11/17/2015, Estádio Nacional Mané Garrincha, Brasilia, Brazil
- 6 11/20/2015, Estadio Mineirão, Belo Horizonte, Brazil
- 7 11/22/2015, Maracanã Stadium, Rio de Janeiro, Brazil
- 8 11/25/2015, Simón Bolívar Park, Bogota, Colombia
- 9 11/28/2015, Foro Sol Satdium, Mexico City, Mexico

=== 2016 official bootlegs ===
- 1 4/8/2016, Ft. Lauderdale, Florida
- 2 4/11/2016, Tampa, Florida
- 3 4/9/2016, Miami, Florida
- 4 4/13/2016, Jacksonville, Florida
- 5 4/16/2016, Greenville, South Carolina
- 6 4/18/2016, Hampton, Virginia
- 7 4/21/2016, Columbia, South Carolina
- 8 4/23/2016, New Orleans, Louisiana
- 9 4/26/2016, Lexington, Kentucky
- 10 4/28/2016, Philadelphia, Pennsylvania
- 11 4/29/2016, Philadelphia, Pennsylvania
- 12 5/1/2016, New York, New York
- 13 5/2/2016, New York, New York
- 14 5/5/2016, Quebec City, Quebec
- 15 5/8/2016, Ottawa, Ontario
- 16 5/10/2016, Toronto, Ontario
- 17 5/12/2016, Toronto Ontario
- 18 6/11/2016, Bonnaroo, Manchester, Tennessee
- 19 7/9/2016, Telluride, Colorado
- 20 7/17/2016, Pemberton, British Columbia
- 21 8/5/2016, Boston, Massachusetts
- 22 8/7/2016, Boston, Massachusetts
- 23 8/20/2016, Wrigley Field, Chicago, Illinois
- 24 8/22/2016, Wrigley Field, Chicago, Illinois

=== 2018 official bootlegs ===
Latin America bootlegs

- 1 3/13/2018, Santiago, Chile
- 2 3/16/2018, Santiago, Chile
- 3 3/21/2018, Rio de Janeiro, Brazil
- 4 3/24/2018, Sao Paulo, Brazil

Europe bootlegs

- 5 6/12/2018, Amsterdam, Netherlands
- 6 6/13/2018, Amsterdam, Netherlands
- 7 6/15/2018, Landgraaf, Netherlands
- 8 6/18/2018, London, England
- 9 6/22/2018, Milan, Italy
- 10 6/24/2018, Padova, Italy
- 11 6/26/2018, Rome, Italy
- 12 7/1/2018, Prague, Czech Republic
- 13 7/3/2018, Krakow, Poland
- 14 7/5/2018, Berlin, Germany
- 15 7/7/2018, Rock Werchter Festival, Werchter, Belgium
- 16 7/10/2018, Barcelona, Spain
- 17 7/14/2018, Lisbon, Portugal
- 18 7/12/2018, Madrid, Spain
- 19 7/17/2018, London, England

North America bootlegs

- 20 8/08/2018, Seattle, Washington
- 21 8/10/2018, Seattle, Washington
- 22 8/13/2018, Missoula, Montana
- 23 8/18/2018, Chicago, Illinois
- 24 8/20/2018, Chicago, Illinois
- 25 9/2/2018, Boston, Massachusetts
- 26 9/4/2018, Boston, Massachusetts

== 2021–2023 ==
Pearl Jam took a break from touring throughout 2019 to record their 11th studio album Gigaton. The band planned to tour throughout 2020 in support of the new album but the tour was postponed to 2022 due to the COVID-19 pandemic.

Official bootlegs for the band's 2021–2023 Tours were available through the band's official website in MP3, FLAC, 24-bit/96 kHz FLAC formats, as well as physical compact discs. The CD orders are fulfilled by nugs.net. In addition, ALAC and 24-bit/96 kHz ALAC formats are available on the nugs.net website.

The 2022 and 2023 bootlegs each premiered on the day of their official streaming broadcast release on SiriusXM Pearl Jam Radio.

=== 2021 official bootlegs ===
- 1 9/18/2021, Sea Hear Now Festival, Asbury Park, New Jersey
- 2 9/26/2021, Ohana Festival, Dana Point, California
- 3 10/01/2021, Ohana Festival, Dana Point, California
- 4 10/02/2021, Ohana Festival, Dana Point, California

=== 2022 official bootlegs ===
North America Leg 1 bootlegs

- 1 5/3/22, Viejas Arena, San Diego, California
- 2 5/6/22, The Forum, Inglewood, California
- 3 5/7/22, The Forum, Inglewood, California
- 4 5/9/22, Gila River Arena, Glendale (Phoenix), Arizona
- 5 5/12/22, Oakland Arena, Oakland, California
- 6 5/13/22, Oakland Arena, Oakland, California
- 7 5/16/22, Save Mart Center, Fresno, California

Europe bootlegs

- 8 6/18/2022, Pinkpop, Landgraaf, Netherlands
- 9 6/21/2022, Waldbühne, Berlin, Germany
- 10 6/23/2022, Hallenstadion, Zurich, Switzerland
- 11 6/25/2022, Autodromo Internazionale Enzo e Dino Ferrari, Imola, Italy
- 12 6/28/2022, Festhalle, Frankfurt, Germany
- 13 6/30/2022, Rock Werchter Festival, Werchter, Belgium
- 14 7/3/2022, Lollapalooza Stockholm, Gärdet, Stockholm, Sweden
- 15 7/5/2022, Royal Arena, Copenhagen, Denmark
- 16 7/8/2022, Hyde Park, London, England
- 17 7/9/2022, Hyde Park, London, England
- 18 7/12/2022, Papp László Sportaréna, Budapest, Hungary
- 19 7/14/2022, Tauron Arena, Kraków, Poland
- 20 7/17/2022, Lollapalooza Paris, Hippodrome de Longchamp, Paris, France
- 21 7/25/2022, Ziggo Dome, Amsterdam, Netherlands

North America Leg 2 bootlegs

- 22 9/1/2022, Videotron Centre, Quebec City, Quebec, Canada
- 23 9/3/2022, Canadian Tire Centre, Ottawa, Ontario, Canada
- 24 9/6/2022, FirstOntario Centre, Hamilton, Ontario, Canada
- 25 9/8/2022, Scotiabank Arena, Toronto, Ontario, Canada
- 26 9/11/2022, Madison Square Garden, New York City, New York
- 27 9/14/2022, Freedom Mortgage Pavilion, Camden, New Jersey
- 28 9/16/2022, Bridgestone Arena, Nashville, Tennessee
- 29 9/17/2022, Kentucky Expo Center, Louisville, Kentucky
- 30 9/18/2022, Enterprise Center, St. Louis, Missouri
- 31 9/20/2022, Paycom Center, Oklahoma City, Oklahoma
- 32 9/22/2022, Ball Arena, Denver, Colorado

=== 2023 official bootlegs ===
- 1 8/31/2023, Xcel Energy Center, St. Paul, Minnesota
- 2 9/2/2023, Xcel Energy Center, St. Paul, Minnesota
- 3 9/5/2023, United Center, Chicago, Illinois
- 4 9/7/2023, United Center, Chicago, Illinois
- 5 9/13/2023, Dickies Arena, Ft. Worth, Texas
- 6 9/15/2023, Dickies Arena, Ft. Worth, Texas
- 7 9/18/2023, Moody Center, Austin, Texas
- 8 9/19/2023, Moody Center, Austin, Texas

== 2024–2025 ==
Though initial recording sessions took place in 2021, in late 2023 Pearl Jam recorded their 12th studio album Dark Matter. On February 13 2024, Pearl Jam announced the album and coinciding tour alongside the release of the title track as the lead single. The album was released on April 19th 2024 and the tour began May 4th.

Official bootlegs for the band's 2024–2025 Tours were available through the band's official website in ALAC, ALAC-HD (24 Bit/96KHz), MP3(256 kbit/s VBR), FLAC, FLAC-HD (24 bit/96KHz) as well as physical compact discs. The CD orders are fulfilled by nugs.net.

The 2024 and 2025 bootlegs each premiered on the day of their official streaming broadcast release on SiriusXM Pearl Jam Radio.

=== 2024 official bootlegs ===
North America Leg 1 bootlegs

- 1 5/4/24, Rogers Arena, Vancouver, British Columbia, Canada
- 2 5/6/24, Rogers Arena, Vancouver, British Columbia, Canada
- 3 5/10/24, Moda Center, Portland, Oregon
- 4 5/13/24, Golden 1 Center, Sacramento, California
- 5 5/16/24, MGM Grand Garden Arena, Las Vegas, Nevada
- 6 5/18/24, MGM Grand Garden Arena, Las Vegas, Nevada
- 7 5/21/24, Kia Forum, Los Angeles, California
- 8 5/22/24, Kia Forum, Los Angeles, California
- 9 5/25/24, BottleRock Festival, Napa Valley, California
- 10 5/28/24, Climate Pledge Arena, Seattle, Washington
- 11 5/30/24, Climate Pledge Arena, Seattle, Washington

Europe bootlegs

- 12 6/22/2024, Marlay Park, Dublin, Ireland
- 13 6/25/2024, Co-Op Live Arena, Manchester, England
- 14 7/6/2024, Palau Sant Jordi, Barcelona, Spain
- 15 7/8/2024, Palau Sant Jordi, Barcelona, Spain
- 16 7/11/2024, Mad Cool Festival, Madrid, Spain
- 17 7/13/2024, Nos Alive Festival, Lisbon, Portugal

North America Leg 2 bootlegs

- 18 8/22/2024, Washington-Grizzly Stadium, Missoula, Montana
- 19 8/26/2024, Ruoff Music Center, Indianapolis, Indiana
- 20 8/29/2024, Wrigley Field, Chicago, Illinois
- 21 8/31/2024, Wrigley Field, Chicago, Illinois
- 22 9/3/2024, Madison Square Garden, New York City, New York
- 23 9/4/2024, Madison Square Garden, New York City, New York
- 24 9/7/2024, Wells Fargo Center, Philadelphia, Pennsylvania
- 25 9/9/2024, Wells Fargo Center, Philadelphia, Pennsylvania
- 26 9/12/2024, CFG Bank Arena, Baltimore, Maryland
- 27 9/15/2024, Fenway Park, Boston, Massachusetts
- 28 9/17/2024, Fenway Park, Boston, Massachusetts
- 29 9/27/2024, Ohana Festival, Dana Point, California
- 30 9/29/2024, Ohana Festival, Dana Point, California

Oceania bootlegs

- 31 11/8/2024, Go Media Stadium, Auckland, New Zealand
- 32 11/10/2024, Go Media Stadium, Auckland, New Zealand
- 33 11/13/2024, People’s First Arena, Gold Coast, Australia
- 34 11/16/2024, Marvel Stadium, Melbourne, Australia
- 35 11/18/2024, Marvel Stadium, Melbourne, Australia
- 36 11/21/2024, ENGIE Stadium, Sydney, Australia
- 37 11/23/2024, ENGIE Stadium, Sydney, Australia

=== 2025 official bootlegs ===
- 1 4/24/2025, Hard Rock Live, Hollywood, Florida
- 2 4/26/2025, Hard Rock Live, Hollywood, Florida
- 3 4/29/2025, State Farm Arena, Atlanta, Georgia
- 4 5/1/2025, State Farm Arena, Atlanta, Georgia
- 5 5/3/2025, JazzFest, New Orleans, Louisiana
- 6 5/6/2025, Bridgestone Arena, Nashville, Tennessee
- 7 5/8/2025, Bridgestone Arena, Nashville, Tennessee
- 8 5/11/2025, Lenovo Center, Raleigh, North Carolina
- 9 5/13/2025, Lenovo Center, Raleigh, North Carolina
- 10 5/16/2025, PPG Paints Arena, Pittsburgh, Pennsylvania
- 11 5/18/2025, PPG Paints Arena, Pittsburgh, Pennsylvania
