= Animal (Pearl Jam song) =

1994 single by Pearl Jam

Single by Pearl Jam

from the album Vs.
- B-side: "Animal" (live) / "Jeremy" (live)
- Released: April 4, 1994
- Genre: Grunge
- Length: 2:49
- Label: Epic
- Composers: Dave Abbruzzese; Jeff Ament; Stone Gossard; Mike McCready; Eddie Vedder
- Lyricist: Eddie Vedder
- Producers: Brendan O'Brien; Pearl Jam

Pearl Jam singles chronology
"Daughter" (1993)	"Animal" (1994)	"Dissident" (1994)

"Animal" is a song by the American rock band Pearl Jam, released in 1994 as the third single from the band's second studio album, Vs. (1993). Although credited to all members of Pearl Jam, it features lyrics written by vocalist Eddie Vedder and music primarily written by guitarist Stone Gossard. The song peaked at number 21 on Billboard's Album Rock Tracks chart. The song was included on Pearl Jam's 2004 greatest hits album, rearviewmirror (Greatest Hits 1991–2003).

== Origin and recording ==
"Animal" originated as an instrumental demo called "Weird A" that was written by guitarist Stone Gossard in 1990. Guitarist Mike McCready said about the song:

I like the lead on that. George Webb, a guy who takes care of all our guitars and amps, was sitting there and I told him I'd do a solo for him. It ended up being the one we used on the record. I did it on a Gibson 335, too. That's a fun song to play.

== Lyrics ==
The actual meaning for "Animal" has usually been confused by fans with some thinking it's about the band's hatred towards the media and others thinking it's about gang rape. In an interview with Melody Maker in 1993, vocalist Eddie Vedder stated:

I don't wanna talk about [who the anger is directed at]. It's not so much personal, it's just, some person at the record company said the other day that they wanted the vocals turned up. He wanted people to understand exactly what I was singing. So I told him what it was about and he said, 'You're right. Let's leave the vocals as they are. Maybe we don't really want people to understand it.'

Originally, Vs. was titled Five Against One, which was taken from the lyric "One, two, three, four, five against one ..." from "Animal". Concerning the original album title, Gossard said:

For me, that title represented a lot of struggles that you go through trying to make a record...Your own independence—your own soul—versus everybody else's. In this band, and I think in rock in general the art of compromise is almost as important as the art of individual expression. You might have five great artists in the band, but if they can't compromise and work together, you don't have a great band. It might mean something completely different to Eddie. But when I heard that lyric, it made a lot of sense to me.

== Release and reception ==
While the "Animal" single was released commercially to international markets in 1994, the commercial single was not released in the United States until June 27, 1995, and was only available as a more expensive import version beforehand. "Animal" peaked at number 21 on Billboard's Album Rock Tracks chart. Outside the United States, the single was released commercially in Australia, Austria, and Germany. "Animal" peaked at number 30 on the Australian Singles Chart and was a top ten success in New Zealand.

"Animal" was described as a song "of a kind of ritual passion, tapping into something truly wild" in Rolling Stone magazine's review of Vs. In AllMusic's review of the "Animal" single, it was stated that "Animal" displays "the raging Seattle grunge guitars and solid melodic sensibilities that enabled them to secure their status as one of the biggest rock bands in the world."

== Live performances ==
"Animal" was first performed live at the band's May 13, 1993, concert in San Francisco at Slim's Café. The song was performed at the MTV Video Music Awards in 1993, a rare occurrence for a song without a music video. Live performances of "Animal" can be found on the "Animal" single, the "Dissident"/Live in Atlanta box set, various official bootlegs, and the Live at the Gorge 05/06 box set. A performance of the song is also included on the DVD Touring Band 2000.

== Track listing ==
All songs written by Dave Abbruzzese, Jeff Ament, Stone Gossard, Mike McCready, and Eddie Vedder, except where noted:

CD (US, Austria, and Germany)

1. "Animal" – 2:47
2. "Animal" (live) – 3:00
3. "Jeremy" (live) (Vedder, Ament) – 5:31
- Live tracks recorded on April 3, 1994, at the Fox Theatre in Atlanta, Georgia.

CD (Australia) and Cassette (Australia)

1. "Animal" – 2:47
2. "Jeremy" (Vedder, Ament) – 5:18
3. "Oceans" (Vedder, Gossard, Ament) – 2:44
4. "Alive" (live) (Vedder, Gossard) – 4:57
  - Recorded live by VARA Radio on June 8, 1992, at Pinkpop Festival in the Netherlands.

CD (Australia) and Cassette (Australia)

1. "Animal" – 2:47
2. "Jeremy" (live) (Vedder, Ament) – 5:31
3. "Daughter" (live) – 5:07
4. "Animal" (live) – 3:00
- Live tracks recorded on April 3, 1994, at the Fox Theatre in Atlanta, Georgia.

== Charts ==
=== Weekly charts ===
Chart (1994)	Peak position
Australia (ARIA)	30
New Zealand (Recorded Music NZ)	7
US Mainstream Rock (Billboard)	21

=== Year-end charts ===
Chart (1994)	Position
Australia (ARIA)	51
