= Jeremy (song) =

1992 single by Pearl Jam

Single by Pearl Jam

from the album Ten
- B-side: "Footsteps"; "Yellow Ledbetter"
- Released: August 17, 1992
- Studio: London Bridge (Seattle, Washington)
- Genre: Grunge
- Length: 5:18 (album version); 4:46 (single edit); 5:21 (promo version)
- Label: Epic
- Composer: Jeff Ament
- Lyricist: Eddie Vedder
- Producers: Rick Parashar; Pearl Jam

Pearl Jam singles chronology
"Even Flow" (1992)	"Jeremy" (1992)	"Oceans" (1992)

Music video
- "Jeremy" on YouTube

"Jeremy" is a song by American rock band Pearl Jam, with lyrics written by vocalist Eddie Vedder and music composed by bassist Jeff Ament. "Jeremy" was released in August 1992 as the third single from Pearl Jam's debut album, Ten (1991). The song was inspired by a newspaper article Vedder read about Jeremy Wade Delle, a high school student who shot himself in front of his English class on January 8, 1991. It reached the number 5 spot on both the Album and Modern Rock Billboard charts. It did not originally chart on the regular Billboard Hot 100 singles chart since it was not released as a commercial single in the US at the time, but a re-release in July 1995 brought it up to number 79.

The song gained popularity for its music video, directed by Mark Pellington and released in 1992, which received heavy rotation by MTV and became a hit. The original music video for "Jeremy" was directed and produced by Chris Cuffaro. Epic Records and MTV later rejected the music video, and released the version directed by Pellington instead. In 1993, the "Jeremy" video was awarded four MTV Video Music Awards, including Best Video of the Year.

== Background ==
"Jeremy" is based on two different true stories. The song takes its main inspiration from a newspaper article about a 15-year-old boy named Jeremy Wade Delle from Richardson, Texas, who shot himself in front of his teacher and his second-period English class of 30 students on the morning of January 8, 1991. In a 2009 interview, Vedder said that he felt "the need to take that small article and make something of it—to give that action, to give it reaction, to give it more importance."

Delle was described by schoolmates as "real quiet" and known for "acting sad". After coming into class late that morning, Delle was ordered to report to the principal's office to go fill out a tardy slip. He left the classroom, then returned with a .357 Magnum revolver. Delle walked to the front of the classroom, announced "Miss, I got what I really went for", put the barrel of the gun in his mouth, and pulled the trigger before his teacher or classmates could react. Lisa Moore, a schoolmate, knew Jeremy from the in-school suspension program: "He and I would pass notes back and forth and he would talk about life and stuff," she said. "He signed all of his notes, 'Write back.' But on Monday he wrote, 'Later days.' I didn't know what to make of it. But I never thought this would happen."

When asked about the song, Vedder explained:

It came from a small paragraph in a paper which means you kill yourself and you make a big old sacrifice and try to get your revenge. That all you're gonna end up with is a paragraph in a newspaper. Sixty-four degrees and cloudy in a suburban neighborhood. That's the beginning of the video and that's the same thing in the end; it does nothing ... nothing changes. The world goes on and you're gone. The best revenge is to live on and prove yourself. Be stronger than those people. And then you can come back.

The second story the song is based on a student that Vedder knew from his junior high school in San Diego, California, who committed a school shooting. He elaborated further in a 1991 interview:

I actually knew somebody in junior high school, in San Diego, California, that did the same thing, just about, didn't take his life but ended up shooting up an oceanography room. I remember being in the halls and hearing it and I had actually had altercations with this kid in the past. I was kind of a rebellious fifth-grader and I think we got in fights and stuff. So it's a bit about this kid named Jeremy and it's also a bit about a kid named Brian that I knew and I don't know ... the song, I think it says a lot. I think it goes somewhere ... and a lot of people interpret it different ways and it's just been recently that I've been talking about the true meaning behind it and I hope no one's offended and believe me, I think of Jeremy when I sing it.

== Composition ==
"Jeremy" features lyrics written by vocalist Eddie Vedder and music written by bassist Jeff Ament. The song's music was written before the band went out on tour in support of Alice in Chains in February 1991.

Ament on the song:

I already had two pieces of music that I wrote on acoustic guitar ... with the idea that I would play them on a Hamer 12-string bass I had just ordered. When the bass arrived, one of [the pieces] became "Jeremy" ... I had an idea for the outro when we were recording it the second time ... I overdubbed a twelve-string bass, and we added a cello. That was big-time production, for us. ... Rick [Parashar]'s a supertalented engineer-musician ... Stone [Gossard, Pearl Jam's rhythm guitarist] was sick one day, and Ed, Rick and I conjured up the art piece that opens and closes the song. That was so fun—I wanted to make a whole record like that.

In another interview, Ament stated:

We knew it was a good song, but it was tough getting it to feel right—for the chorus to sit back and the outro to push over the top. The tune went from practically not making it on the record to being one of the best takes. I'm not sure if it's the best song on the album but I think it's the best take. On "Jeremy" I always heard this other melody in the choruses and the end, and it never sounded good on guitar or bass. So we brought in a cello player which inspired a background vocal, and those things made the song really happen. Most of the time if something doesn't work right away, I just say fuck it—but this was an instance when perseverance paid off.

== Artwork ==
The picture used for the cover was taken by Lance Mercer. The little girl who appears in the picture is Jessica Curtis, daughter of Kelly Curtis, the group's long-time manager.

== Release and reception ==
On August 17, 1992, "Jeremy" was released as a single in Australia and Europe. The following month, on September 14, it was issued in the United Kingdom. The B-sides were the previously unreleased "Footsteps" and "Yellow Ledbetter". Both of these were later included on the compilation album Lost Dogs (2003), "Footsteps" as an alternate version. "Yellow Ledbetter" can also be found on the band's rearviewmirror (Greatest Hits 1991–2003). In the United States, "Jeremy" was not released as a single until June 27, 1995; before that date, the single was only available as a more expensive import version.

"Jeremy" became the most successful song from Ten on the American rock charts. It peaked at number five on the US Billboard Album Rock Tracks and Billboard Modern Rock Tracks charts. The single has been certified gold by the Recording Industry Association of America (RIAA). "Jeremy" reached the top 40 on the Canadian Singles Chart. It also reached the UK top 20, peaked at number 93 in Germany, reached the top 40 in New Zealand, and was a top-10 success in Ireland. At the 1993 Grammy Awards, "Jeremy" received nominations for Best Rock Song and Best Hard Rock Performance.

Chris True of AllMusic said that "Jeremy" "is where Pearl Jam mania galvanized and propelled the band past the 'Seattle sound' and into rock royalty." He described it as a "classic buildup tune" and proclaimed it as "arguably Pearl Jam's most earnest work and one of their most successful singles." Stephen M. Deusner of Pitchfork said, "'Jeremy' is the most pat Freudian psychodrama on an album full of them."

== Music video ==
=== Original video ===
In July 1991, Vedder became acquainted with photographer Chris Cuffaro. Vedder suggested Cuffaro film a music video for the band. On Vedder's insistence, Epic gave Cuffaro permission to use any song off Ten. He chose "Jeremy", which was not intended to be released as a single at the time. Epic refused to fund the clip, forcing Cuffaro to finance it himself.

Cuffaro raised the money by taking out a loan and selling all of his furniture and half his guitar collection. Cuffaro and his crew spent a day filming several scenes of a young actor, Eric Schubert, playing the part of Jeremy. The scenes with Pearl Jam were filmed in a warehouse on Pico Boulevard in Los Angeles, California. A revolving platform was rigged at the center of the set, and the members of the band climbed on it individually to give the illusion of the song being performed as a crew member spun the giant turntable by hand. Vedder appeared with black gaffer's tape around his biceps as a mourning band for the real Jeremy.

=== Official video ===
By the time Cuffaro finished his music video, Epic had warmed up to the idea of releasing "Jeremy" as a single. Music video director Mark Pellington was brought in to handle the project. Pellington said that he "wasn't a huge fan of the band, but the lyrics intrigued me—I spoke to Eddie, and I really got connected to his passion." Pellington and Pearl Jam convened in Kings Cross, London, England, in June 1992 to film a new version of the "Jeremy" music video.

Working with veteran editor Bruce Ashley, Pellington's high-budget video incorporated rapid-fire editing and juxtaposition of sound, still images, graphics and text elements with live action sequences to create a collage effect. The classroom scenes were filmed at Bayonne High School in New Jersey. The video also featured many close-ups of Vedder performing the song, with the other members of Pearl Jam shown only briefly. Some of the stock imagery was similar to the original video, but when it came to the band, Pellington focused on Vedder. Vedder thus serves as the video's narrator. Ament said, "It was mostly Mark and Ed's vision. In fact, I think it would have been a better video if the rest of the band wasn't in it. I know some of us were having a hard time with the movie-type video that Mark made, because our two previous videos were made live." Jeremy was played by 12-year-old Trevor Wilson, in his only acting role. Wilson would drown in 2016, at age 36, while swimming in Puerto Rico.

The video premiered on August 1, 1992, and quickly found its way into heavy rotation on MTV. Michele Romero of Entertainment Weekly described the music video as "an Afterschool Special from hell." She stated that "when Eddie Vedder yowls the lyric 'Jeremy spoke in class today,' a chill frosts your cranium to the point of queasy enjoyment." The success of the "Jeremy" video helped catapult Pearl Jam to fame. Pellington stated, "I think that video tapped into something that has always been around and will always be around. You're always going to have peer pressure, you're always going to have adolescent rage, you're always going to have dysfunctional families."

The video won four MTV Video Music Awards in 1993, including Best Video of the Year, Best Group Video, Best Metal/Hard Rock Video, and Best Direction. Wilson appeared with Pearl Jam onstage when they won Best Video of the Year. In the entirety of Vedder's acceptance speech, he introduced Wilson to the crowd, saying, "This is Trevor. He lives." As he and Wilson raised clasped hands, Vedder patted him on the head, and the audience cheered. Vedder went on to say "No, um ... I mean, I guess you gotta say thanks ... No, the real shit is ... If it weren't for music, I think I would have shot myself in the front of the classroom, you know. It really is what kept me alive, so this is kind of full circle. So to the power of music, thanks." He then handed the award to Wilson.

==== Synopsis ====
A shot from the end of the video, depicting Jeremy's blood-spattered classmates.

Jeremy is shown at school being alienated from, and taunted by, his classmates, running shirtless through a forest, and screaming at his parents at a dinner table. Only Jeremy is shown moving in the video; all of the other characters depicted are almost always frozen in a series of stationary tableaus. Shots of words depicting others' presumed descriptions of Jeremy—such as problem, peer, harmless, and bored—frequently appear onscreen. Included are three biblical allusions: "the serpent was subtil", from Genesis 3:1, "the unclean spirit entered", a reversal of Mark 5:13, and Genesis 3:6, referencing the concept of original sin.

As the song becomes more dense and frenetic, Jeremy's behavior becomes increasingly agitated. Strobe lighting adds to the anxious atmosphere. Jeremy is shown standing, arms raised in a V (as described in the lyrics at the beginning of the song), in front of a wall of billowing flames. He is later shown staring at the camera while wrapped in an American flag, surrounded by fire. He then stands shirtless in an artificial forest, surrounded by various drawings. He becomes aggravated, breaks off a branch, and swings it at various trees in anger, all while lights flash around his body.

The final scene of the video shows Jeremy striding into class shirtless, tossing an apple to the teacher, and standing before his classmates. He reaches down and draws back his arm as he takes a gun out of his pocket. (The gun only appears onscreen in the unedited version of the video.) The edited version cuts to an extreme close-up of Jeremy's face as he puts the barrel of the gun in his mouth, closes his eyes, and pulls the trigger. After a flash of light, the screen turns black. The next shot is a pan across the classroom, showing Jeremy's blood-spattered classmates, all completely still, recoiling in horror. The video ends on a shot of a dangling blackboard, on which all the harsh terms and phrases seen earlier are scrawled.

==== Controversy ====
Pellington's original video shows Jeremy putting the gun in his mouth at the climax. However, this ran afoul of MTV restrictions on violent imagery. As such, the weapon was cropped out of the shot by zooming in on the upper part of Jeremy's face. Ironically, the ambiguity created by the gun being unseen, combined with the subsequent shot of the defensive posture of Jeremy's classmates and the large amount of blood on them, led many viewers to believe that the video ended with Jeremy shooting his classmates, not himself. In 1997, Rolling Stone described the song and video as depicting an unpopular student bringing a gun to class and shooting people. Pellington himself dismissed this interpretation of the video. He said, "Probably the greatest frustration I've ever had is that the ending is sometimes misinterpreted as that he shot his classmates. The idea is, that's his blood on them, and they're frozen at the moment of looking."

Another change that was made to the version for MTV was the shortening of the Pledge of Allegiance sequence, showing Jeremy's classmates making a gesture that could be either the American Bellamy salute or the Hitler salute.

After "Jeremy", Pearl Jam backed away from making music videos. "Ten years from now," Ament said, "I don't want people to remember our songs as videos." The band did not release another video until 1998's "Do the Evolution", which is entirely animated.

In 1996, a shooting occurred at Frontier Junior High School in Moses Lake, Washington, that left three dead and a fourth injured. The prosecutors for the case said the shooter, Barry Loukaitis, was influenced by the edited version of the music video.

MTV and VH1 have rarely broadcast the video since the Columbine High School massacre in 1999, but it still airs from time to time on MTV Classic. It can also occasionally be seen playing at Hard Rock Cafe locations. Documentaries about the era, such as I Love the '90s, tend to omit mention of the video. However, clips of it were shown during VH1's countdown "100 Greatest Songs of the '90s", which placed "Jeremy" at number 11. The video was included in MuchMusic's list of the 12 most controversial videos, due to its subject of suicide, and in light of school shootings.

The uncensored version of the video was remastered in high definition and released on Pearl Jam's official YouTube channel on June 5, 2020, to mark National Gun Violence Awareness Day. The remastered version also features a new audio track, remixed by Brendan O'Brien for the 2009 reissue of Ten. This version was shown as part of VH1 Classic's retrospective Pearl Jam Ten Revisited, which coincided with the album's rerelease.

== Live performances ==
"Jeremy" was first performed live by Pearl Jam on May 17, 1991, at the Off Ramp Café in Seattle, Washington. The band's 1992 appearance on MTV Unplugged included a performance of the song. At the 1992 MTV Video Music Awards, the band had intended to play the Dead Boys song "Sonic Reducer", but MTV insisted on "Jeremy", since the video was in heavy rotation (although it had been released after the deadline for that year's awards). At the end of the intense performance, however, Vedder managed to sneak in a reference to "Sonic Reducer" by singing that song's first line: "I don't need no ... I don't need no mom and dad."

Live performances of "Jeremy" can be found on the "Animal" single, the "Dissident"/Live in Atlanta box set, various official bootlegs, the Live at the Gorge 05/06 box set, and the Drop in the Park LP included in the Super Deluxe edition of the Ten reissue. Performances of the song are also included on the DVD Touring Band 2000 and the MTV Unplugged DVD included in the Ten reissue.

== Accolades ==
Accolades for "Jeremy"
Source	Country	Accolade	Year	Rank
Kerrang!	United Kingdom	"100 Greatest Singles of All Time"	2002	85
MTV	United States	"100 Greatest Videos Ever Made"	1999	19
Rolling Stone	United States	"The 100 Top Music Videos"	1993	36
Rolling Stone	United States	"The 100 Greatest Pop Songs Since the Beatles"	2000	48
VH1	United States	"100 Best Songs of the Past 25 Years"	2003	32
VH1	United States	"100 Greatest Songs of the '90s"	2007	11

== Track listings ==
CD (US, Australia, Austria, Brazil, and Germany) and cassette (Australia and Indonesia)

1. "Jeremy" (Eddie Vedder, Jeff Ament) – 4:49
2. "Footsteps" (Stone Gossard, Vedder) – 3:53
  - Recorded live on Rockline on May 11, 1992.
3. "Yellow Ledbetter" (Ament, Mike McCready, Vedder) – 5:04

CD (UK)

1. "Jeremy" (single version) (Vedder, Ament) – 4:46
2. "Yellow Ledbetter" (Ament, McCready, Vedder) – 5:04
3. "Alive" (live) (Vedder, Gossard) – 4:55
  - Recorded live on August 3, 1991, at RKCNDY in Seattle, Washington.

7-inch and cassette (UK)

1. "Jeremy" (single version) (Vedder, Ament) – 4:46
2. "Alive" (live) (Vedder, Gossard) – 4:55
  - Recorded live on August 3, 1991, at RKCNDY in Seattle, Washington.

7-inch (The Netherlands)

1. "Jeremy" (Vedder, Ament) – 4:49
2. "Footsteps" (Gossard, Vedder) – 3:53
  - Recorded live on Rockline on May 11, 1992.

7-inch (US)

1. "Jeremy" (single version) (Vedder, Ament) – 5:18
2. "Alive" (Vedder, Gossard) – 5:40

12-inch (UK)

1. "Jeremy" (Vedder, Ament) – 4:46
2. "Footsteps" (Gossard, Vedder) – 3:53
  - Recorded live on Rockline on May 11, 1992.
3. "Alive" (live) (Vedder, Gossard) – 4:55
  - Recorded live on August 3, 1991, at RKCNDY in Seattle, Washington.

== Personnel ==
Pearl Jam

- Eddie Vedder – vocals
- Mike McCready – lead guitar
- Stone Gossard – rhythm guitar
- Jeff Ament – twelve-string bass
- Dave Krusen – drums

Additional musicians

- Walter Gray – cello
- Rick Parashar – organ, percussion

== Charts ==
=== Weekly charts ===
Weekly chart peaks for "Jeremy"
Chart (1992–1993)	Peak position
Australia (ARIA)	68
Canada Top Singles (RPM)	32
Europe (Eurochart Hot 100)	57
Germany (GfK)	93
Ireland (IRMA)	10
Netherlands (Single Top 100)	59
New Zealand (Recorded Music NZ)	34
UK Singles (Official Charts)	15
US Alternative Airplay (Billboard)	5
US Mainstream Rock (Billboard)	5

Chart (1995)	Peak position
US Billboard Hot 100	79

=== Year-end charts ===
Year-end chart performance for "Jeremy"
Chart (1992)	Position
US Album Rock Tracks (Billboard)	38

Chart (2001)	Position
Canada (Nielsen SoundScan)	96

Chart (2002)	Position
Canada (Nielsen SoundScan)	148

== Certifications ==
Certifications and sales for "Jeremy"
Region	Certification	Certified units/sales
Brazil (Pro-Música Brasil)	Gold	30,000^{‡}
New Zealand (RMNZ)	Platinum	30,000^{‡}
United Kingdom (BPI)	Silver	200,000^{‡}
United States (RIAA)	Gold	500,000^{^}
^{^} Shipments figures based on certification alone.^{‡} Sales+streaming figures based on certification alone.

== Release history ==
Release dates and formats for "Jeremy"
Region	Date	Format(s)	Label(s)	Ref.
United States	July 21, 1992	Radio	Epic	
Australia	August 17, 1992	CD; cassette	Epic	
Europe	August 17, 1992	CD	Epic	
United Kingdom	September 14, 1992	7-inch vinyl; 12-inch vinyl; CD; cassette	Epic	
United States	June 27, 1995	CD	Epic	
