= Rearviewmirror =

Song by Pearl Jam

from the album Vs.
- Released: October 18, 1993
- Genre: Grunge
- Length: 4:44
- Label: Epic
- Composers: Dave Abbruzzese; Jeff Ament; Stone Gossard; Mike McCready; Eddie Vedder
- Lyricist: Eddie Vedder
- Producers: Brendan O'Brien; Pearl Jam

"Rearviewmirror" is a song by the American rock band Pearl Jam. The song is the eighth track on the band's second studio album, Vs. (1993). Although credited to all members of Pearl Jam, it was primarily written by vocalist Eddie Vedder. The song was included on Pearl Jam's 2004 greatest hits album, rearviewmirror (Greatest Hits 1991–2003).

== Origin and recording ==
"Rearviewmirror" was one of the first songs to feature vocalist Eddie Vedder on guitar. Vedder wrote the song. Guitarist Stone Gossard said that the band played the song "exactly like he wrote it." Guitarist Mike McCready experimented with an EBow on the song.

At the end of the studio cut drummer Dave Abbruzzese can be heard throwing his drum sticks against the wall in frustration. This was in response to the pressure that was placed on him by producer Brendan O'Brien during the recording of the track. After recording the track he punched a hole through the snare drum and threw it off the side of a cliff.

Vedder finished recording the vocals for the song on the last day of recording for Vs. Vedder had an issue with the song being too "catchy."

== Lyrics ==
Vedder about "Rearviewmirror":

We start off with the music and it kinds of propels the lyrics. It made me feel like I was in a car, leaving something, a bad situation. There's an emotion there. I remembered all the times I wanted to leave...

== Reception ==
Regarding "Rearviewmirror", David Browne of Entertainment Weekly said, "For once, those rippling guitar chords wrap themselves around a real hook, and Eddie's clenched delivery is perfect for a song about the pain of leaving behind a hopeless relationship and moving on." Paul Evans of Rolling Stone said that "when Vedder roars, 'Saw things...clearer.../Once you were in my rearviewmirror,' it seems that it's not only some personal sorrow that he's willing himself to tear beyond but the entire weight of the past itself."

== Live performances ==
"Rearviewmirror" was first performed live at the band's May 13, 1993 concert in San Francisco, California at Slim's Café. The song was performed on Saturday Night Live in April 1994 in support of Vs. Live performances of "Rearviewmirror" can be found on the "Dissident" single, various official bootlegs, the Live at the Gorge 05/06 box set, and the live album Live at Lollapalooza 2007. Performances of the song are also included on the DVDs Touring Band 2000, Live at the Showbox, and Live at the Garden.

== Personnel ==
- Eddie Vedder – vocals, rhythm guitar
- Stone Gossard – rhythm guitar
- Mike McCready – lead guitar, EBow
- Jeff Ament – bass guitar
- Dave Abbruzzese – drums

== Accolades ==
Publication	Country	Accolade	Year	Rank
Q	United Kingdom	"The Ultimate Music Collection"	2005	*

* denotes an unordered list
