= Global Inheritance =

American nonprofit organization

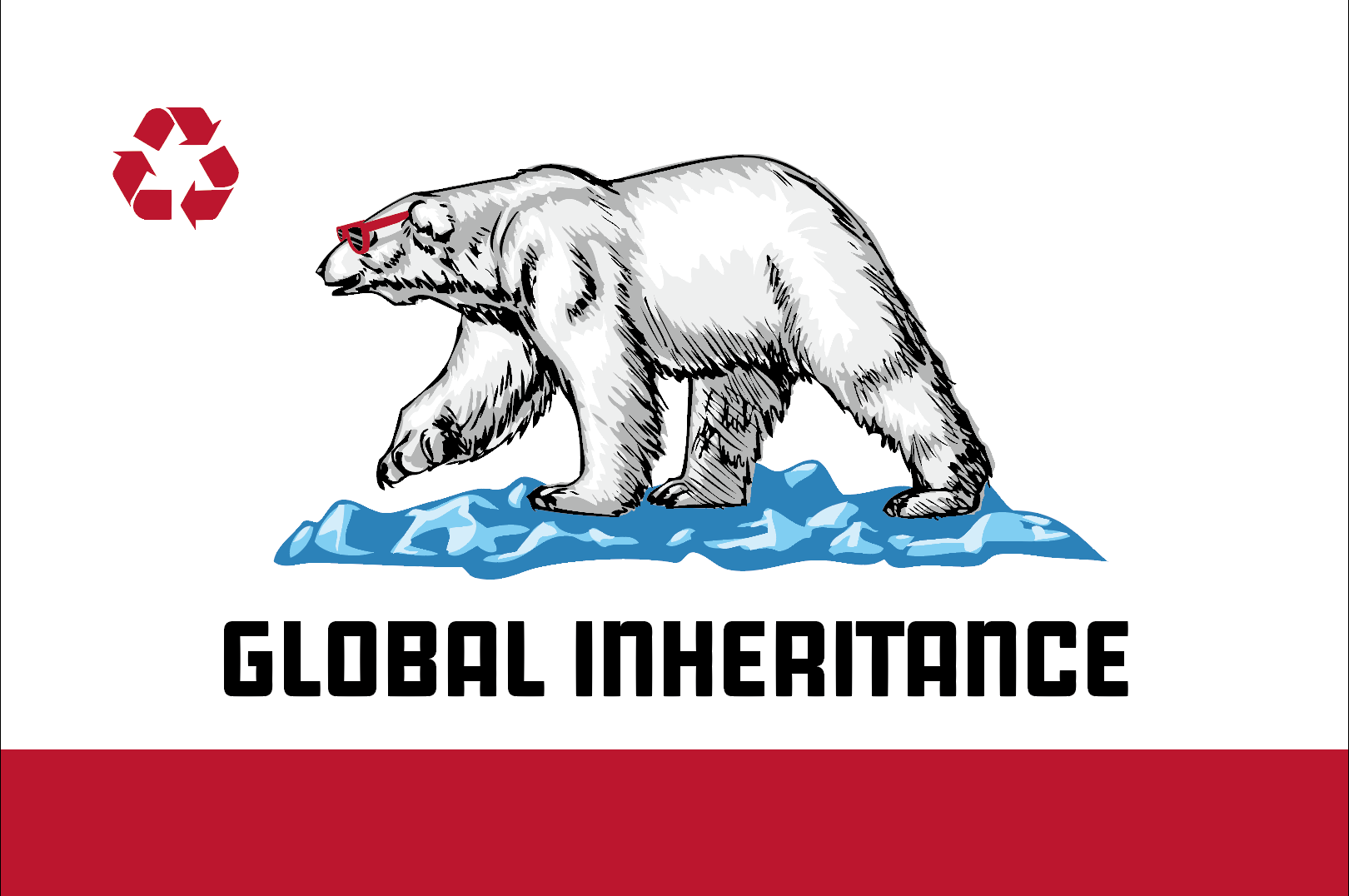
- Founded: 2002
- Founder: Eric Ritz
- Location: Los Angeles, California, U.S.
- Website: www.globalinheritance.org

Global Inheritance is an American 501(c)(3) nonprofit organization based in Los Angeles, California, founded in 2002. The organization develops interactive programs designed to engage and educate young people about social and environmental issues.

== History and origins ==
Founded as "Fashion Peace" in 2002, Global Inheritance was envisioned by Eric Ritz as "an NGO advertising agency for mother earth and the improvement of mankind." Ritz was frustrated with other environmental organizations that failed to connect with a broader audience, and wanted to create an organization that could connect with people from every walk of life. In addition, he wanted to employ the power of music and art to inspire people, rather than focusing strictly on money as he had seen others do. Ritz wanted an organization that would bridge the gap between environmental causes and everyday people, hoping to use creativity to spark an interest in the issues and inspire action.

The early organization partnered with clothing companies and designers to re-purpose old clothing into designer outfits. Although that particular program is now only one of many, the spirit of using creativity to encourage and even glamorize sustainable living remains a foundation of the organization. Early partner companies included Diesel, Levi's, Miss Sixty, and American Apparel.

Global Inheritance's first collaboration with Coachella began in 2004, when the festival allowed the organization to transform a small number of recycling bins into artist-designed pieces. Following positive reception, the initiative expanded the next year to include 120 decorated bins. Since then, Global Inheritance has introduced a variety of interactive environmental programs at Coachella, including Poltar the Great, Energy FACTory DJ Mixer, Oasis Water Bar, and Recyclosaurus Rex, while maintaining core initiatives like TRASHed Coachella: Art of Recycling, Carpoolchella, Energy Playground, and the Recycling Store.

Beyond Coachella, Global Inheritance has collaborated with various companies, cities, schools, and event producers to promote environmental awareness. The organization has partnered with companies such as Apple, Vice, HP, Amtrak, Toyota, Nike, The North Face, and Burton, as well as major cultural and sporting events, including the Super Bowl, Lollapalooza, and other large-scale festivals.

Global Inheritance now runs approximately 25–30 programs a year for a variety of festivals, events, and companies.

== Current programs ==
Energy Battle Royale is an interactive performance and activation featuring various sustainable technologies personified through energy superheroes — solar, wind, geothermal, hydrogen, biogas, nuclear, tidal, and ethanol — who perform dynamic rap battles and dance competitions. Students are given an energy power card that includes facts and statistics, encouraging them to support a power source.

Carpoolchella is an initiative designed to encourage festival-goers to carpool to Coachella with four or more people in a vehicle. Participants are invited to decorate their vehicles with Carpoolchella, with the requirement that the logo is displayed prominently on a paper of at least A4 size. The program aims to reduce gas consumption, lower costs, and minimize emissions by promoting shared rides to the festival. Throughout the event, a secret spotter monitors various parking and camping entrances. The spotter may approach carpool vehicles to verify eligibility for potential prizes, including the chance to win a VIP For Life pass. Vehicles that are easily recognizable and creatively decorated have a higher chance of being selected.

The POSTed Studio Speaker at Coachella, established in 2019, is a platform that brings together artists, scientists, politicians, and activists to discuss environmental and social issues. Attendees are invited to design unique postcards as part of a contest, with the chance for their designs to be featured. The initiative encourages participation in social and environmental advocacy through art.

The Plastic-Free Pharmacy was an educational program designed to encourage the reduction of single-use plastics at music festivals. The initiative featured a mock "doctor’s office" where attendees could consult with scientists about ways to minimize plastic consumption and lower their carbon footprint. Participants received a "prescription" outlining sustainable alternatives, which could be exchanged at the Plastic-Free Pharmacy for reusable and eco-friendly items such as bamboo toothbrushes, toothpaste tabs, shampoo bars, reusable utensils, storage bags, beeswax wraps, tote bags, and water bottles.

Meat The Beetles was a 1960s-inspired cultural and culinary program that combined environmental awareness with music and art, centered around insect-based cuisine. Led by chef Joseph Yoon, founder of Brooklyn Bugs, the initiative aimed to promote insects as a sustainable and nutrient-dense protein source. Through collaborations with universities, museums, and culinary institutions, Yoon sought to normalize insect consumption as an environmentally friendly alternative to traditional protein sources. The program featured interactive experiences such as "Taste Testing Record Stores" and food trucks offering a variety of insect-based dishes, including chocolate-covered flying ants, beetle bread, BBQ crickets, and superworm pizza.

The Saving Nature Claw Machine Experience was an interactive exhibit designed to educate participants about endangered species and conservation efforts. Visitors selected an animal they intended to "rescue," answered questions about it, and took a photo as a pledge of commitment. They then operated a claw machine to lift an animal figure to safety, earning points based on the species' level of endangerment. Higher-risk species were worth more points, which could be redeemed for Coachella experiences and merchandise. Animal experts were present to provide information on global conservation efforts and ways individuals could contribute to protecting wildlife.

Poltar the Great was an interactive exhibit featuring a fortune-telling polar bear that provided insights on topics related to life, relationships, and environmental issues. Visitors could ask questions about their future, including sustainability-related topics such as switching to electric vehicles or experiencing natural phenomena like glaciers.

Rain Supreme was a traveling art and water conservation exhibit featuring artist-designed water barrels aimed at promoting awareness of California's drought and water-saving practices. The barrels were displayed at over 30 festivals, concerts, and events, offering attendees the opportunity to learn about rainwater collection, rebate programs, and water conservation techniques. Visitors could view the collection, order rain barrels, and receive guidance from water conservation experts. After the exhibition, the barrels were auctioned to support Global Inheritance’s interactive water education programs.

Truth & Dare was an interactive environmental awareness program that engaged participants in discussions about their personal sustainability habits. Participants were connected to a polygraph machine and interviewed by a personified representation of Planet Earth, who questioned them about their environmental behaviors. Based on their responses, individuals were challenged to commit to eco-friendly actions, such as avoiding single-use plastics for a week or using public transportation for a month. Those who participated honestly were entered to win prizes, including festival passes, VIP upgrades, and band merchandise.

TRASHed Art of Recycling was an artist-driven initiative that created art pieces using everyday recycling bins. Since the 2004 Coachella Valley Music & Arts Festival, the program has partnered with over 1,000 artists to create redesigned recycling bins. The recycling bins have since been moved into galleries, other music festivals, sporting events, and public gatherings across North America, South America, and Europe. After the events, many of the bins were donated to local schools.

Launched in 2017, the POSTed Studio is an interactive design studio where individuals create poster concepts around social or environmental issues. Professional designers transform the art created by individuals to build a library of issue-based poster art available to the public. Since its founding in 2017, POSTed Studio has partnered with events and organizations such as Coachella, Camp Flog Gnaw, National Geographic, Desert Daze, Arroyo Seco, Stagecoach, among various others.

== Past programs ==
=== Tour Rider ===
Global Inheritance partnered with Bill Silva Presents and Andy Hewitt in 2005 to bring Tour Rider to the Hollywood Bowl in Los Angeles. Concertgoers who used public transportation to arrive at the venue could stop by the Tour Rider booth to receive prizes in exchange for their environmentally friendly behavior. The Metro offered several options to arrive at the Hollywood Bowl, including a direct connection to the venue. Prizes ranged from museum and event passes to eco-friendly clothing and accessories. Recent concerts that have featured the Tour Rider program included Paul McCartney, Radiohead, Roger Waters, Kings of Leon, among various others. Tour Rider rewarded concertgoers for helping the environment and decreasing traffic congestion.

=== Alternative Energy Fuel RC Racing ===
Starting in 2006 at the ESPN X Games, Global Inheritance introduced a new program that allows participants to race miniature RC cars that ran on alternative fuels and power sources. If attendees could not afford a hybrid or did not have a driver's license, they were still allowed to race an RC cart powered by ethanol, biodiesel, or solar power.

=== Environmentaland ===
Environmentaland was a theme park and environmental museum that focused on environmental issues and sustainable living through games, competitions, and exhibits. Located at the Hollywood & Highland complex (now known as Ovation Hollywood), which is also the venue of the Academy Awards, Environmentaland was the first theme park of its kind. In addition to focusing on the impact of global warming through desert miniature golf and touring the eco-planetarium, visitors could participate in the energy playground, which featured a seesaw and Tour de Energy bicycles that generated power. Environmentaland facilitated adventures in self-powered activities as well, such as milkshakes made on bike-powered blenders and a hand-crank Pearl Jam listening station. Environmentaland also featured numerous events, including The Bigger Picture, a series of documentaries that focused on environmental and social issues.

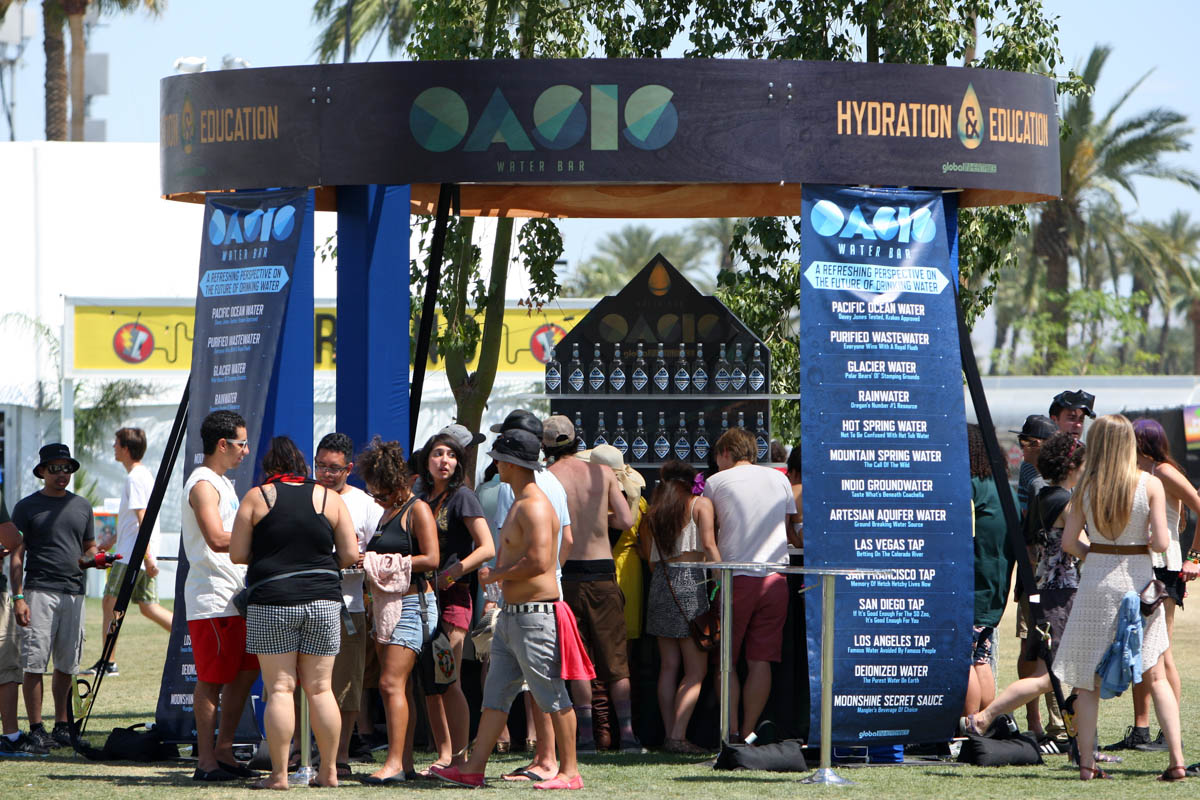
The Oasis Water Bar at Coachella (2013)

=== Global Warming Chess ===
Global Warming Chess immersed participants and players into a life-size game of chess where they are the chess pieces. The game was intended to demonstrate the volatile and unpredictable nature of the fight against global warming. Festival attendees were encouraged to watch as the two opposing sides maneuvered to eliminate each other and dominate the board. During each match, festival-goers competed against bands, a polar bear, or Halliburton's CEO. Donning costumes for each chess piece, participants were divided into sides representing the "causes" and "cures" of global warming. Costumes for the "causes" include Hummers as pawns, factories as rooks, coal as knights, lobbyists as bishops, trash as queen, and an oil derrick as king. "Cure" costumes included bicycles as pawns, recycling bins as rooks, solar panels as knights, scientists as bishops, a tree as queen, and a wind turbine as king. The Global Warming Chess program premiered in 2008 at the Virgin Music Festival in Toronto, Canada.

=== Public Displays of Affection ===
Public Displays of Affection (PDA) was launched in 2006 to recreate the way people in Los Angeles view public transportation. In another combination of environmental sustainability and the arts, Global Inheritance collaborated with various bands to reward public transportation riders. PDA took over major venues, including Los Angeles Union Station, that are easily accessible by public transportation. Anyone with an incoming Metro ticket or bus pass was admitted free of charge. The project aimed to prove that public transportation is a viable alternative to LA's car culture. Past concerts have included Ladytron at Hollywood & Highland and the Secret Machines with Shepard Fairey at Union Station.
