= Radius clause =

Form of non-compete clause used in the live music industry

A radius clause is a form of non-compete clause used in the live music industry, in which a tour promoter stipulates that a performer, for a certain length of time prior to or following an appearance at a concert or festival, must not hold concerts at other locations within a certain radius of the city where they are to perform. In essence, it gives the promoter a form of territorial exclusivity, ensuring that the performer does not book concerts with competing promoters and venues in nearby areas, which can undermine ticket sales for their main event.

Critics in favor of radius clauses have agreed with their intent to protect the investments of organizers into the production and promotion of music events, and that they are a worthwhile trade-off for acts wanting to obtain the expanded exposure that a festival performance can provide. Others have criticized the concept, arguing that they effectively discourage major acts from performing in smaller cities, and are influenced by a profit-oriented mentality in the live events industry. In 2010, the state of Illinois also launched an antitrust investigation into the use of radius clauses by Lollapalooza.

== Effects ==
Radius clauses contractually ensure that a particular act does not hold events at competing venues or festivals within a certain distance of a city in which they are scheduled to perform, for a length of time prior to and/or after the performance. For example, a band booked to perform at a venue in San Francisco may be barred from performing in cities within a 60 miles (97 km) radius of San Francisco, for 60 days, before and after the concert. These clauses intend to maximize ticket sales; as an act cannot also perform concerts in smaller, nearby markets, fans in these markets are forced to instead buy tickets for the act in the major market.

The use of radius clauses has been considered controversial by some venue owners—especially those who own small-market venues in proximity to larger markets, or those in markets with a large number of venues—as they affect their ability to book major acts. In the city of Chicago, radius clauses imposed by the city's major music festival Lollapalooza can make it difficult for venues and block parties around the city to book major acts during the lucrative summer months. Similar effects are faced by the Greater Los Angeles Area in the lead-up to the Coachella Festival, although they are not as pronounced as those of Lollapalooza because their radius clauses fall during the winter months.

Dangerbird Records founder Jeff Castelaz argued that such clauses were a "reality" in the music business, since music festival promoters have to protect their investments in securing acts and promoting their event. On the other hand, while noting that festival appearances can be a significant milestone for an up-and-coming act rather than exclusively playing clubs, talent agency head Tom Windish felt that there was a mentality in the live events industry where "if you don't have 75,000 people at your event, it's a failure."

== Notable users ==
=== Coachella ===
The Coachella Valley Music and Arts Festival uses radius clauses which, as of 2012, could prevent acts from performing in Los Angeles, the Inland Empire, or San Diego for up to three months before and after the festival. The festival has allowed some of its acts to make appearances in the region prior to the festival, but only at events and venues operated by festival parent company Anschutz Entertainment Group (AEG)—such as Jay-Z at Staples Center in 2010. That year also marked the first time Coachella had ever sold out in advance.

In 2018, the organizers of the Portland, Oregon Soul'd Out Music Festival filed an antitrust lawsuit against AEG, alleging that Coachella had enforced radius clauses much stricter than previously reported. In its original complaint, the organizers stated that the restrictions had extended to the entirety of California, as well as Arizona, Nevada, Oregon, and Washington. In an amended complaint, the organizers identified that Coachella performers are forbidden from:

- During a period that starts on the December 15 prior to Coachella and ends on the following May 1.
  - Playing any festival in North America
  - Playing any "hard ticket" concerts in Southern California
- Publicizing any tour stops in California, Arizona, Oregon, or Washington until after the Coachella lineup is announced.
- Publicizing any performances at competing festivals in California, its bordering states, and Washington, or a headlining concert in Southern California, until May 8.
- Publicizing any performances at competing festivals in the remainder of the United States (except for the New Orleans Jazz & Heritage Festival, South by Southwest, and Ultra Music Festival) until after the Coachella lineup is announced. With respect to Nevada, they can publicize appearances at Las Vegas casinos, or tour stops in other parts of Nevada, but cannot publicize Las Vegas festival appearances.

=== Other events ===
In April 2010, it was reported that Illinois Attorney General Lisa Madigan had launched an antitrust investigation into the Lollapalooza festival's use of radius clauses. It was alleged that the festival had imposed radius clauses on performers that were so strict, that some acts were barred from performing within 300 miles (480 km) of Chicago—including cities as far as Detroit, Indianapolis, and Milwaukee—for as long as six months prior to, and three months after Lollapalooza. The investigation was closed in 2012 with no action taken.

In June 2014, the Toronto festival NXNE announced that it would drop a 45-day radius clause it had implemented for its 2014 edition, following protests by fans and artists (including a Change.org petition with over 3000 signatures), with a particular emphasis on its effects on emerging artists. NXNE 2014 marked the first time that it had been held just weeks after Canadian Music Week (CMW)—which had moved to May from its traditional March date; the clause had been implemented primarily to prevent NXNE acts from performing at CMW.

In 2017, South By Southwest (SXSW) was the subject of criticism for several controversial clauses in its performance contracts, including one warning that international performers entering the United States under the Visa Waiver Program to perform at SXSW would face threats of deportation and passport revocation if they performed outside of their "official" events (a large number of parties unaffiliated with SXSW are held in Austin alongside the official festival). Managing director Roland Swenson stated that this clause was based on U.S. immigration law; performing in the country requires a work visa, but SXSW performers have typically qualified under the Visa Waiver Program because it classifies itself as an "industry showcase". Those who do perform under this clause are legally forbidden from performing any shows beyond the specific showcase they have been granted permission for. Some critics initially interpreted this statement as being a traditional radius clause.
