= Paul Tollett =

American concert promoter and entrepreneur

- Born: 1965 (age 60–61)
- Education: Cal Poly Pomona
- Occupation: Promoter
- Years active: 1986–present
- Employer: Goldenvoice
- Title: CEO and president

Paul Tollett is an American music promoter. He is the president and CEO of Goldenvoice, a Los Angeles-based concert production company, and the co-founder of the Coachella Valley Music and Arts Festival.

== Early life and education ==
Tollett was born in Ohio and grew up in Pomona, California. He and his brother, Perry, regularly attended punk and hardcore shows promoted by Goldenvoice. The Tolletts promoted their first show while in high school.

== Career ==
Tollett met Gary Tovar, Goldenvoice's owner, at a Bad Manners concert in Long Beach in 1986. He worked part time for Goldenvoice while a chemistry student at CalPoly Pomona, dropping out in his senior year to become a full time employee.

In 1991, he and Rick Van Santen, a longtime associate of Tovar's, bought Goldenvoice. Their first shows featured artists including Black Flag, Jane’s Addiction, and N.W.A. Tollett said in 2011 that Tovar taught him "everything".

In 1996, Paul and Perry Tollett converted a Thrifty drug store in Pomona into a 600-capacity live music venue, the Glass House. No Doubt was the first band that played the Glass House, which became known for its all-ages rock and punk shows. In 2007, with partners Ed and Jerry Tessier, the Tolletts purchased and renovated the historic Pomona Fox Theater.

In 1997, Tollett and Van Santen developed the concept for the Coachella Valley Music and Arts Festival, which was held for the first time in 1999. It lost approximately $750,000. Although Goldenvoice survived the loss, based in part on Tollett's history of "fair dealing with bands and venders", it was a struggle; Tollett sold his house and his car.

Goldenvoice was acquired by AEG in March 2001; by then it was one of the most prominent promoters of rock and punk shows in the United States.

The second Coachella took place as a one-day festival in 2001. In 2012 it was expanded to six days over two consecutive weekends. The 2018 festival drew an audience of approximately 250,000 people. The 2019 festival sold out in six hours.

Van Santen died in 2003. Tollett and Van Santen were "inseparable" from 1988 to the time of Van Santen's death. In a 2011 interview, he said: "We couldn't have done it without each other."
