= Lollapalooza =

American annual music festival

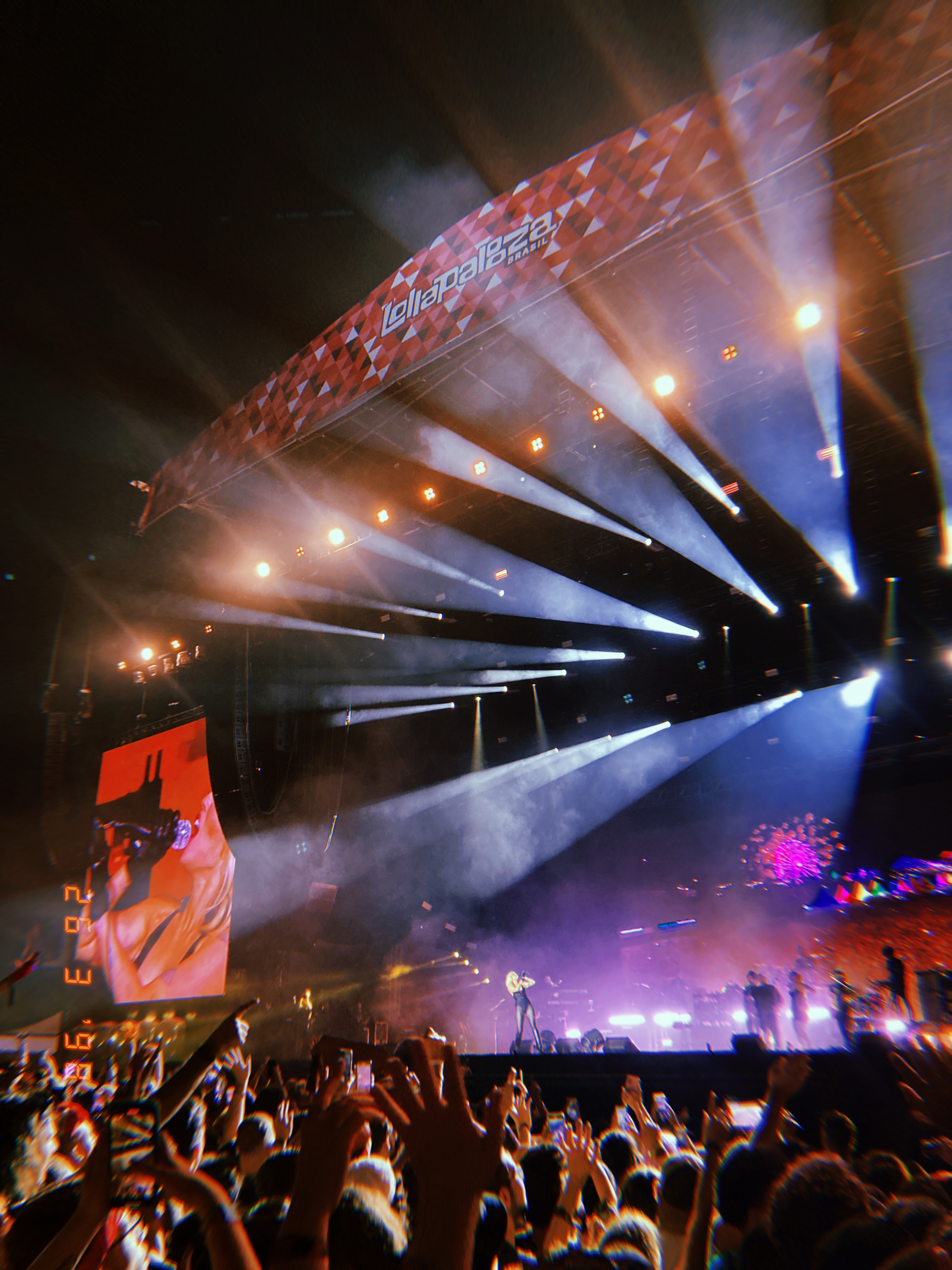
- Miley Cyrus during the Attention Tour at Lollapalooza Brasil 2022
- Genre: Alternative rock; punk rock; heavy metal; pop; hip-hop; electronic; soul
- Frequency: Annually
- Locations: Grant Park, Chicago (2005–2019, 2020 (digital), 2021–present): Touring (1991–1997, 2003); O'Higgins Park, Santiago (2011–2019; 2026); Bicentennial Park, Cerrillos (2022–2025); Hoppegarten Hippodrome, Hoppegarten (2017); Hipódromo de Cidade Jardim, São Paulo (2012–13); Autódromo José Carlos Pace, São Paulo (2014–2019, 2022–present); Hipódromo de San Isidro, Buenos Aires (2014–2019, 2022–present); Flughafen Berlin-Tempelhof, Berlin (2015); Treptower Park, Berlin (2016); Olympiapark, Berlin (2018–2019, 2022–present); Hippodrome de Longchamp, Paris (2017–2019, 2022–present); Gärdet, Stockholm (2019, 2022–2023); Mahalaxmi Racecourse, Mumbai (2023–present)
- Years active: 1991–1997, 2003, 2005–2019, 2021–present
- Inaugurated: July 18, 1991; 35 years ago
- Founders: Perry Farrell
- Most recent: January 24–25, 2026 (Mumbai); September 12–13, 2025 (Berlin); July 31 – August 3, 2025 (Chicago); July 18–20, 2025 (Paris); March 20–22, 2026 (São Paulo); March 13–15, 2026 (Santiago); March 21–23, 2025 (Buenos Aires)
- Attendance: 400,000
- Capacity: 115,000
- Website: lollapalooza.com

Lollapalooza (/ˌlɒləpəˈluːzə/) is an annual American four-day music festival held in Grant Park in Chicago. It originally started as a touring event in 1991, but settled permanently in Chicago in 2005. Music genres include alternative rock, heavy metal, punk rock, hip-hop, and electronic dance music. Lollapalooza has also featured visual arts, nonprofit organizations, and political organizations. The festival hosts an estimated 400,000 people each July and sells out annually. Lollapalooza is one of the largest music festivals in the world and one of the longest-running in the United States.

Lollapalooza was conceived and created in 1991 as a farewell tour by Perry Farrell, singer of the group Jane's Addiction. The first Lollapalooza tour had a diverse collection of bands and was a commercial success. It stopped in more than twenty cities in North America. In 2020, Spin rated the first Lollapalooza as the best concert of the preceding 35 years. Lollapalooza then ran annually until 1997, and was revived in 2003. From its inception through 1997 and its revival in 2003, the festival toured North America. In 2004, the organizers expanded the dates to two days per city but canceled the tour after poor ticket sales.

In 2005, Farrell and the William Morris Agency partnered with Austin, Texas–based company Capital Sports Entertainment (now C3 Presents) and retooled the event into its current format as an annual festival in Chicago. In 2014, Live Nation Entertainment bought a controlling interest in C3 Presents.

In 2010, it was announced that Lollapalooza would remain in Chicago, while also debuting outside the United States, with a branch of the festival staged in Santiago, Chile, on April 2–3, 2011, where it partnered with Santiago-based company Lotus. In 2011, Geo Events confirmed the Brazilian version of the event, which was held at the Jockey Club in São Paulo on April 7–8, 2012. The Argentine version started in April 2014 in Buenos Aires and in November of that year, the first European Lollapalooza was held at the former Berlin Tempelhof Airport.

== Etymology ==
The word—sometimes alternatively spelled and pronounced as lollapalootza, lalapaloosa, or lallapaloosa (P. G. Wodehouse, The Heart of a Goof)—dates from a late 19th-century/early 20th-century American idiomatic phrase meaning "an extraordinary or unusual thing, person, or event; an exceptional example or instance". Its earliest known use was in 1896. In time, the term also came to refer to a large lollipop. Farrell, searching for a name for his festival, liked the euphonious quality of the by-then-antiquated term, which he claimed he had heard in a Three Stooges short film, though a search of their catalog turned up nothing related. Paying homage to the term's double meaning, a character in the festival's original logo holds a lollipop.

== History ==
=== Creation ===
Inspired by events such as Britain's Reading Festival—which Lollapalooza cofounder Perry Farrell had been due to play in 1990—Farrell, Ted Gardner, Don Muller, and Marc Geiger conceived the festival in 1990 as a farewell for Farrell's band Jane's Addiction.

Unlike previous festivals such as Woodstock, Summer Jam at Watkins Glen, A Gathering of the Tribes, and the US Festival, which were one-time events held at single venues, Lollapalooza toured across the United States and Canada from mid-July until late August 1991. The inaugural Lollapalooza lineup was diverse and made up of artists from alternative rock (such as Siouxsie and the Banshees who were the second headliners), industrial music (such as Nine Inch Nails), and rap (Ice-T rapped and used the platform to launch Body Count, his heavy metal band). The premiere in Phoenix, Arizona, on July 18, 1991, was covered by a report on MTV, which ended by journalist Dave Kendall saying "Lollapalooza could be the tour of the summer". The tour ended at King County Fairgrounds in Enumclaw, Washington, near Seattle, on August 28, 1991.

Another key concept was the inclusion of nonmusical features. Performers such as the Jim Rose Circus Side Show, an alternative freak show, and the Shaolin monks stretched the boundaries of rock culture. There was a tent for display of art pieces, virtual reality games, and information tables for political and environmental nonprofit groups, promoting counterculture and political awareness. "Basically, I'm bored", Farrell said at the time. "I just want to see things that are unexpected and slightly bizarre. The way Barnum & Bailey perceived putting on a show...well, they had a different angle."

=== Success and decline ===
The inaugural edition in 1991 was a surprise massive success. For Dave Grohl of Nirvana, who saw it in Los Angeles, the festival helped change the mentalities in the music industry. Butthole Surfers opened the day, playing in front of a big audience, and Siouxsie and the Banshees "were like the Led Zeppelin of that scene". "It felt like something was happening, that was the beginning of it all". In an interview filmed on the opening day in Phoenix, rapper Ice-T stated: "I know it is gonna be a tour people are gonna talk about for a long time". That year, Farrell also coined the term "Alternative Nation" when talking about the festival. In 2020, when rating the first edition as the greatest US tour in 35 years, Spin wrote that it "changed the trajectory of the '90s, helping usher the alternative era into the mainstream. [...] Lollapalooza provided a common home for artists on the mainstream periphery. [...] Lolla became the template for what became the modern American festival."

The explosion of alternative rock in the early 1990s propelled Lollapalooza forward. However, MTV noted that the second edition was organized in a different way and included bands who had achieved commercial success. Journalist Kurt Loder commented: "By 1992 the music that had once been trumpeted as alternative was quickly becoming mainstream and the second Lollapalooza reflected the shift. [...] The 1992 headliners included acts such as Soundgarden and Red Hot Chili Peppers, bands that were hardly strangers to the mainstream pop charts". The 1992 and 1993 festivals also leaned heavily on grunge and alternative acts, and usually featured an additional rap artist. Crowd behaviors prominent at punk rock concerts such as mosh pits and crowd surfing became regular parts of the shows. These years also saw marked increases in the participatory nature of the event, with the inclusion of booths for open-microphone readings and oratory, television-smashing pits, and tattoo and piercing parlors. After 1991, the festival included a second stage (and in 1996, a third) for up-and-coming bands or local acts. Attendee complaints of the festival included high ticket prices as well as the high cost for food and water at the shows. The event took place at the Alpine Valley festival in East Troy, Wisconsin on August 29, 1992, and also at World Music Theater in Tinley Park, Illinois (near Chicago), where concertgoers ripped up chunks of sod and grass and threw them at each other and at the bands, resulting in tens of thousands of dollars in damages to the venue. The same summer, patrons at Great Woods in Mansfield, Massachusetts had torn up the venue's fencing and burned it in bonfires throughout the show. The tour then relocated its New England stop to the naval yard at Quonset Point for two years, until Rhode Island officials vowed to keep it out, and in 1995, the tour returned to Great Woods.

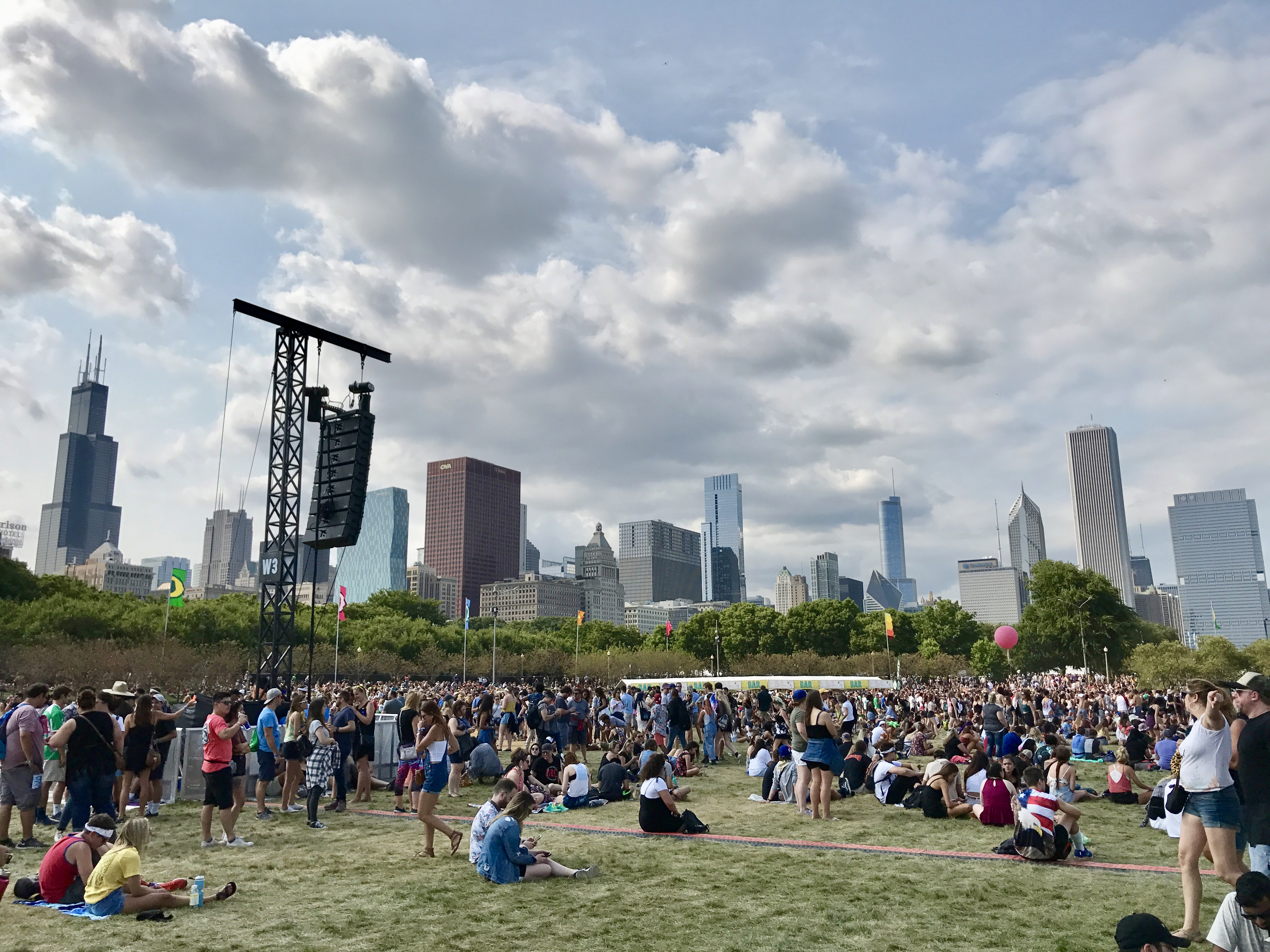
Lollapalooza with the Chicago skyline backdrop

Grunge band Nirvana was scheduled to headline at the festival in 1994, reportedly being offered nearly $10 million to do it. However, frontman Kurt Cobain turned it down, and the band officially dropped out of the festival on April 7, 1994. Cobain's body was discovered in Seattle the next day. His widow, Courtney Love, made guest appearances at several shows, including the Philadelphia show at FDR Park (usually taking time given to her by the Smashing Pumpkins vocalist/guitarist Billy Corgan), speaking to the crowds about the loss, then singing a minimum of two songs. Farrell worked with rock poster artist Jim Evans (T.A.Z.) to create a series of posters and the complete graphic decoration for the 1994 event, including two seventy-foot-tall Buddha statues that flanked the main stage.

In 1996, Farrell, who had been the soul of the festival, decided to focus his energy to produce his new festival project, ENIT, and did not participate in producing Lollapalooza. Many fans saw the addition of Metallica in 1996 as contrary to the festival's prior practice of featuring "non-mainstream" artists, and described the crowds attracted by Metallica as being singularly focused on the headliner without respect for the other performing artists. Moreover, festival cofounder Farrell felt that Metallica's macho image violated his peaceful vision for the festival, as the alternative culture of the early 1990s was generally against macho behavior. Farrell quit the tour in protest.

Responding to the controversial Metallica incident, Lollapalooza made efforts to revive its relevance to audiences. The festival booked eclectic acts such as country superstar Waylon Jennings in 1996, and emphasized heavily electronica groups such as the Orb and the Prodigy in 1997. 1997, however, would prove to be the final tour from the initial series of Lollapalooza events. The festival failed to find a suitable headliner in 1998 and therefore announced Lollapalooza's cancellation. The cancellation served as a signifier of alternative rock's declining popularity. In light of the festival's troubles that year, Spin magazine said, "Lollapalooza is as comatose as alternative rock right now."

=== Revival ===
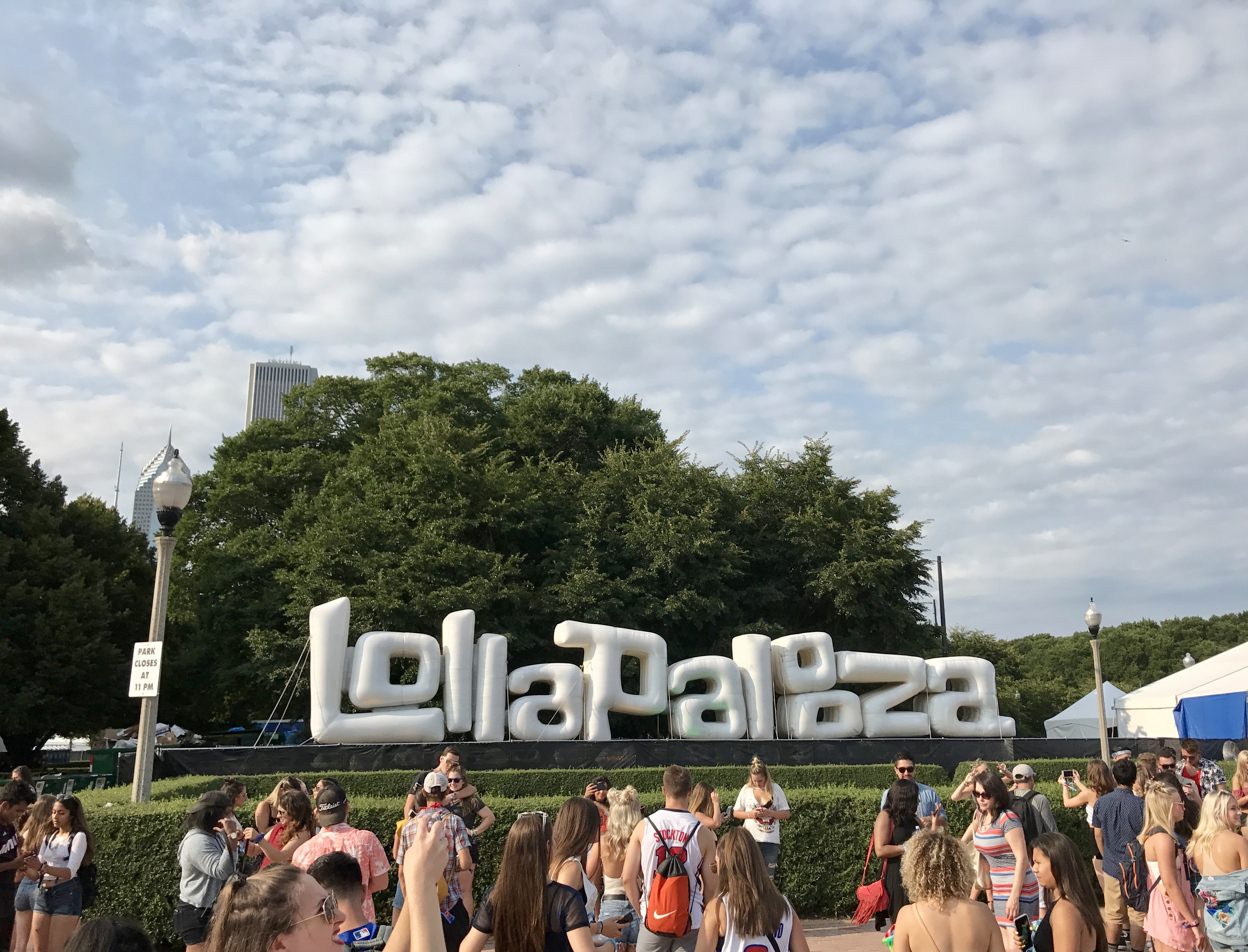
Lollapalooza welcome sign in Grant Park, Chicago

In 2003, Farrell reconvened Jane's Addiction and scheduled a new Lollapalooza tour. The festival schedule included venues in thirty cities through July and August. The 2003 tour achieved only marginal success, with many fans staying away, presumably because of high ticket prices. Another tour scheduled for 2004 was to consist of a two-day festival taking place in each city. Despite a bill with Morrissey, Sonic Youth, PJ Harvey, Pixies, and the Flaming Lips as headliners, the 2004 edition was canceled in June due to weak ticket sales across the country. In 2005, Farrell partnered with Capital Sports & Entertainment (now C3 Presents), which co-owns and produces the Austin City Limits Music Festival, to produce Lollapalooza. CSE, Farrell, and the William Morris Agency—along with Charles Attal Presents—resurrected Lollapalooza as a two-day destination festival in 2005 in Chicago's Grant Park, with an even greater variety of performers (70 acts on five stages) than that of the touring festival. The event was generally successful, attracting over 65,000 attendees, despite a 104-degree Fahrenheit Sunday (40 degrees Celsius) heat wave (two people were hospitalized for heat-related illness).

It returned to Chicago on August 4–6, 2006. On October 25, 2006, the Chicago Park District and Capital Sports & Entertainment agreed to a five-year, $5 million deal, keeping Lollapalooza at Grant Park in Chicago until 2011. Lollapalooza ran August 3–5 in 2007; August 1–3, 2008; August 7–9, 2009; August 6–8, 2010; August 5–7, 2011; August 3–5, 2012; August 2–4, 2013; and August 1–3, 2014. After a successful 2008 festival, another deal was signed to keep Lollapalooza in Chicago through 2018, guaranteeing the city $13 million.

The 2016 iteration of the event was four days long, from July 28 to 31, to celebrate the event's 25th anniversary.

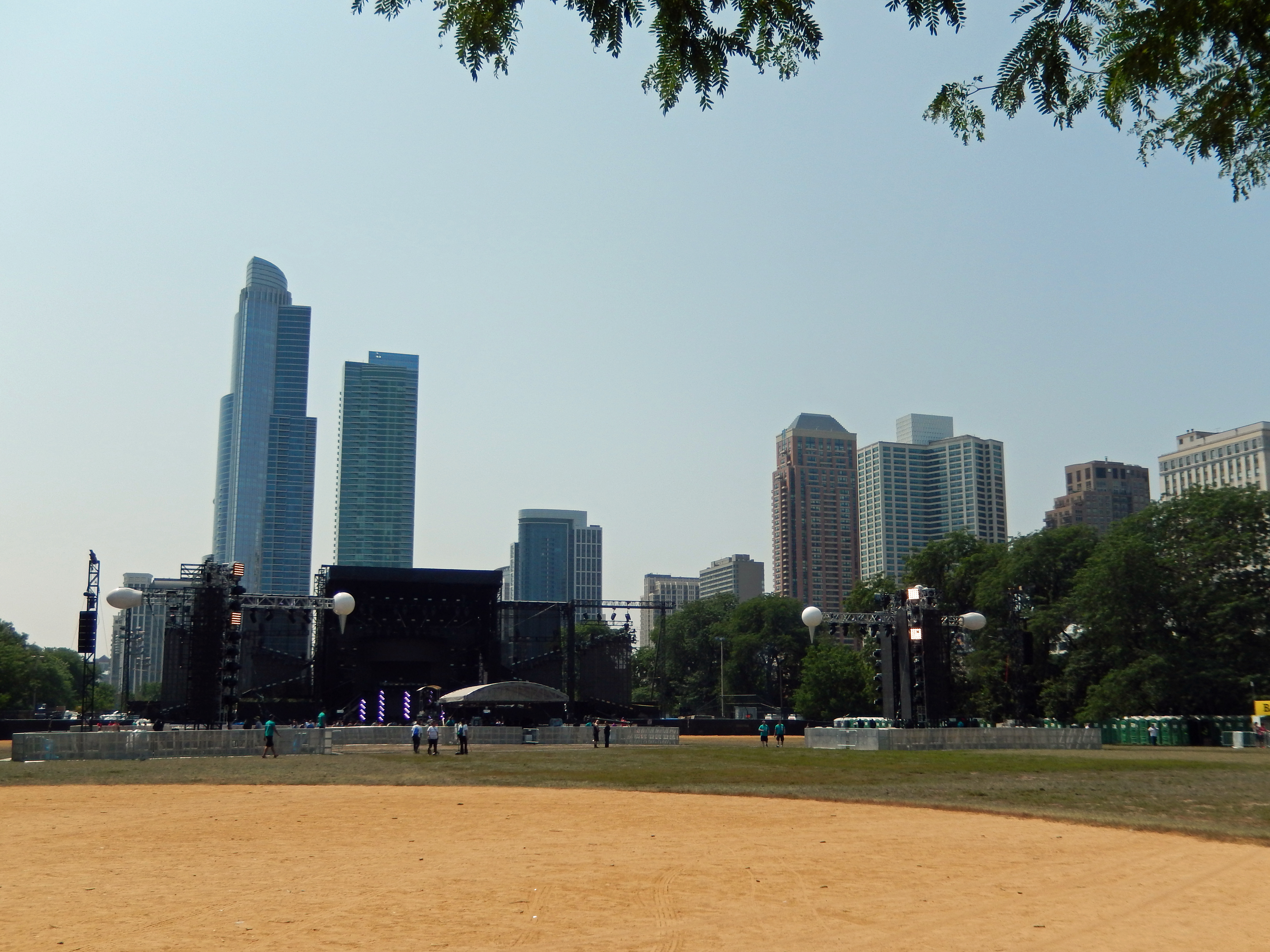
An empty Lollapalooza stage (Chicago)

The 2020 festival was initially scheduled to occur July 30 – August 2. However, due to the COVID-19 pandemic, the event was officially canceled on June 9. The festival postponed the sale of tickets in March as a precaution to the possible shutdown of live music events. In order to keep the spirit of the festival going, the city of Chicago announced that they would offer a livestreamed event occurring the same weekend as the initially planned event. The livestreamed version featured acts such as A$AP Rocky, Brockhampton, Lupe Fiasco, Outkast, and many more performing on a free YouTube broadcast.

On May 18, 2021, festival organizers and the City of Chicago announced that Lollapalooza would return at full capacity from July 29 to August 2, 2021. In May 2022, it was announced that Hulu would exclusively stream the festival, alongside Austin City Limits and Bonnaroo.

== Festival tickets and pricing ==
Tickets to the flagship and original Lollapalooza edition, in Chicago, usually sold out extremely quickly. For the 2016 event, the four-day general passes sold out in about one day after the sale began. The one-day passes sold even more quickly: they were gone less than three hours after organizers revealed the lineup for the four-day music festival. Because of this phenomenon, people who cannot buy the passes try to get them through alternatives sources such as Craigslist and StubHub. This is a common practice, although the prices tend to be significantly higher on these websites. In 2018, the festival experienced unusually slower sales, so they released the lineup about eight hours earlier.

In its earliest editions, the official passes cost $31.50. However, with its growth and prominent relevance in the music world, Lollapalooza pass prices have increased substantially over the years. Comparing the weekend passes for Lollapalooza 2016, which cost $335, with the ones for Lollapalooza 2015, at $275, the increase was more than 20%. The price for weekend passes from 2016 to 2018 remained the same. In 2020, a slight increase of five dollars was added to weekend passes, making them $340, though it was cancelled caused on pandemic grounds. As of 2026, 4-day weekend passes start at $399.

== Spin-off events ==
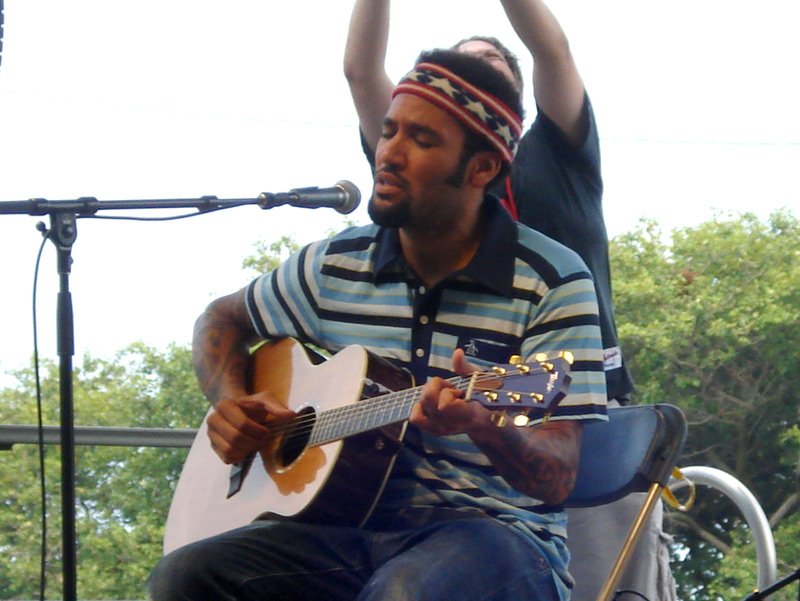
Ben Harper performing at Kidzapalooza 2007

=== Kidzapalooza ===
Originally thought of by music producer Tor Hyams, Kidzapalooza was the idea for a more child-centered experience to the adult Lollapalooza. Hyams came to Perry Farrell with the idea in 2005, and later that year the event first appeared in Chicago. Kidzapalooza has been a success and appeared alongside every Lollapalooza since its original debut in 2005. The event includes many different events for children to enjoy such as game, design, and art stations where children can express their creativity. Musical instruments are set up for children to play and experience in another station of the venue. Raffles and various other amenities are available to the children as well. Due to the COVID-19 pandemic, the 2020 installation of Kidzapalooza was canceled. Kidzapalooza has sprouted to other venues taking interest, such as the Hollywood Bowl hosting its own Kidzapalooza in 2008 as a stand-alone event.

=== PurimPalooza ===
Another play on the Lollapalooza name, PurimPalooza is a celebration of Purim, a Jewish holiday. The celebration includes traditional Purim practices such as a commemoratory meal, attendees dressing up in costume, and a public reading of the Scroll of Esther. The night is followed up by less traditional Purim practices, with the addition of live music, by primarily Jewish artists, and drinking for those of age. In 1999, Farrell himself performed at PurimPalooza, hosted by Rabbi Josef Langer, at the Great American Music Hall in San Francisco. Again in 2006, Farrell performed at PurimPalooza, hosted at the Ruby Skye in San Francisco, which featured artists such as Matisyahu and Chutzpah.

== International expansion ==
=== Chile ===
In 2010, it was announced that Lollapalooza would debut in South America, with a branch of the festival staged in Chile's capital Santiago on April 2–3, 2011.

The inaugural Lollapalooza Chile lineup included Jane's Addiction, Thirty Seconds to Mars, the National, Manny and Gil the Latin, the Drums, the Killers, Los Bunkers, Ana Tijoux, Javiera Mena, Fatboy Slim, Deftones, Los Plumabits, Cypress Hill, 311, the Flaming Lips, and many others.

The eighth edition was held on March 16–18, 2018, with Pearl Jam, Lana Del Rey, the Killers, Red Hot Chili Peppers, and LCD Soundsystem as headliners. In October 2022, the lineup for the next year's event was announced and included headliners Blink-182, Billie Eilish, Lil Nas X, Drake, Rosalía, and Tame Impala.

In August 2024, the headliners of the following year's lineup were announced: Olivia Rodrigo, Rüfüs Du Sol, Justin Timberlake, Alanis Morissette, Tool, and Shawn Mendes.

=== Brazil ===
Following the success of the Chilean events, a Brazilian version was confirmed in 2011, and had its inaugural edition at the Jockey Club in São Paulo on April 7–8, 2012. In the following year, Lollapalooza was again held at Jockey Club during Holy Week, this time expanding to three days that filled the whole Paschal Triduum—March 29–31, 2013. The third edition was moved to the Autódromo José Carlos Pace in São Paulo's borough of Interlagos, happening on April 5 and 6, 2014. Interlagos remained the festival's home ever since, starting with the following editions, on March 28–29, 2015, March 12–13, 2016, March 25–26, 2017, March 23–25, 2018, and April 5–7, 2019.

The 2020 edition was supposed to happen in April 3–5, with headliners Guns N' Roses, Travis Scott, and the Strokes, but it was canceled a week before the planned dates due to COVID-19 lockdowns. The festival was rescheduled to December 4–6 of the same year, maintaining the same headliners, but was, once again, shut down due to COVID. It was again rescheduled to September 10–12, 2021, due to continued COVID restrictions, this time not confirming its headliners or other attractions.

After two years of expectations, the festival was rescheduled for a fourth time, to March 25–27, 2022. The event finally returned in March 2022 on the scheduled dates, with headliners the Strokes and Miley Cyrus. Foo Fighters were supposed to close the festival on March 27, but their drummer, Taylor Hawkins, died two days before the event, while touring South America. The band was replaced with various Brazilian artists paying tribute to the musician.

The 2023 Brazilian version of the festival took place from March 24 to 26. Announced headliners were Billie Eilish, Blink-182, and Drake. Blink-182 cancelled a few weeks before the event due to drummer Travis Barker injuring his hand. The band was replaced by Twenty One Pilots. Drake also cancelled his performance hours before he was scheduled to go onstage, causing commotion online as he was seen at an American club the night before; he was replaced by Skrillex.

The 2024 edition happened on March 22–24, with Blink-182, SZA, Kings of Leon, Sam Smith, Arcade Fire, Limp Bizkit, and Titãs headlining. Kings of Leon were replacements for Paramore, who canceled just two months before the festival.

The 2025 edition took place on March 28–30 and was headlined by Olivia Rodrigo, Rüfüs Du Sol, Shawn Mendes, Alanis Morissette, Justin Timberlake, and Tool.

The 2026 edition was held on March 20–22, featuring 71 acts, both national and international, with headliners including Sabrina Carpenter, Tyler, the Creator, Lorde, Chappell Roan, Deftones, the Warning and Skrillex.

The 2027 edition is scheduled for March 19–21, with the headliners being Travis Scott, Charli XCX, The Killers, David Guetta, Queens Of The Stone Age, The Neighbourhood, Fontaines D.C., The Prodigy, Sombr and Mochakk.

=== Argentina ===
On September 10, 2013, it was announced that the Argentine version of the festival would be held in Buenos Aires. Since then, Lollapalooza has had an annual edition at the Hipódromo de San Isidro, usually in the last week of March.

=== Germany ===
On November 4, 2014, it was announced that the first European Lollapalooza would be held in the German capital of Berlin. It was scheduled for September 12–13, 2015, and the proposed location was the historical airport grounds of Berlin-Tempelhof. In the official press release, festival founder Perry Farrell stated that, "Berlin's energy, vibrant art, fashion and music scenes are a mirror reflection of what Lollapalooza is all about and I can't wait to share in this cultural exchange". Lollapalooza Germany was produced by the Lollapalooza U.S. team, in addition to Melt! Booking and Festival Republic, who have helped run both Reading and Leeds festivals in England. The 2016 edition of the event took place in the Treptower Park in Berlin, on September 10–11. It drew 70,000 visitors each day.

At change.org, an online petition against the festival in the Treptower Park gathered over 6,400 supporters. Citizens from the area created working groups to stop the festival taking place, due to noise and other complaints.

Since 2018 (except 2020), the festival has been held at the Olympiapark Berlin.

=== Sweden ===
The first Scandinavian edition of Lollapalooza was held in the Swedish capital of Stockholm, on June 28–30, 2019. After being canceled for two years due to the COVID-19 pandemic, Lollapalooza returned to Stockholm on July 1–3, 2022. The 2022 event was attended by over 70,000 people, making it the biggest Swedish festival of all time. In 2024, Lollapalooza Stockholm announced a cancellation of that year's festival as well as an indefinite hiatus, leaving the Berlin and Paris locations as the two remaining European Lollapalooza festivals.

=== France ===
On October 12, 2016, Lollapalooza announced that they would be hosting a festival in Paris, France. The inaugural edition of the event took place at the city's Longchamp Racecourse grounds on July 22–23, 2017. The lineup for Lollapalooza Paris 2017 was announced on January 17, 2017, and included Red Hot Chili Peppers and The Weeknd as headliners. Following that, the lineup included the likes of Imagine Dragons, Lana Del Rey, DJ Snake, London Grammar, Alt-J, The Roots, Marshmello, Liam Gallagher, Martin Solveig, Skepta, Glass Animals, Milky Chance, Don Diablo, Oliver Heldens, Crystal Fighters, Jauz, Alan Walker, and many more. Since then, the festival has taken place in France every year, except for 2020, due to the COVID-19 pandemic, and 2024, when it was canceled due to logistical, administrative, and security constraints.

=== Israel ===
On August 7, 2012, Perry Farrell announced that Lollapalooza would be debuting in Tel Aviv, Israel. Farrell described Israel as an "international music community that listens to everything we all listen to, but the artists weren't traveling there so it was an opportunity." The event was scheduled for August 20–22, 2013 in Yarkon Park, the city's largest urban park. However, the event was postponed to an unspecified date. While there was no definitive reason for the cancellation of the Israel date, various news sources reported financial challenges associated with producing a large-scale show with international artists within the political situation in the Middle East.

=== India ===
On July 27, 2022, Lollapalooza announced that they would be debuting at the Mahalaxmi Racecourse in Mumbai, India, on January 28–29, 2023. This would be Lollapalooza's first event in Asia, partnering with BookMyShow. The headliners of the two-day event were Imagine Dragons, the Strokes, and Diplo. The lineup included nearly forty artists, such as Cigarettes After Sex, Raveena, Greta Van Fleet, Japanese Breakfast, the Wombats, Jackson Wang, and AP Dhillon.

Lollapalooza India's second edition was held the following year, with Jonas Brothers and Sting being the headliners. The 2025 edition saw Green Day and Shawn Mendes headline and also featured international artists like Louis Tomlinson, Glass Animals, Aurora, Cory Wong, and Zedd and Indian musicians such as Hanumankind, Niladri Kumar, and DOT, among others.

Lollapalooza India's 2026 edition had Playboi Carti and Linkin Park as headliners.

In September 2026, the headliners for Lollapalooza India 2027 were announced, including Olivia Dean, Limp Bizkit, Katseye, Fontainers D.C., 5 Seconds of Summer, St. Vincent, Steve Angello and ¥ØU$UK€ ¥UK1MAT$U.

== Criticism ==
Recording engineer, guitarist, and journalist Steve Albini has criticized Lollapalooza for its corporatization of popularized "alternative" music. In a 1993 interview, Albini commented:

Lollapalooza is the worst example of corporate encroachment into what is supposed to be the underground. It is just a large scale marketing of bands that pretend to be alternative but are in reality just another facet of the mass cultural exploitation scheme. I have no appreciation or affection for those bands and I have no interest in that whole circle. If Lollapalooza had Jesus Lizard and the Melvins and Fugazi and Slint then you could make a case that it was actually people on the vanguard of music. What it really is is the most popular bands on MTV that are not heavy metal.

Both the Jesus Lizard and Melvins have subsequently performed at the event.

In April 2010, it was reported that Illinois Attorney General Lisa Madigan had launched an antitrust investigation into the festival for imposing radius clauses on acts, contractually stipulating that they could not perform in cities within 300 miles of Chicago—including cities as far as Detroit, Indianapolis, and Milwaukee—for up to six months prior, and three months after Lollapalooza. The investigation was closed in 2012, with no action taken.

== See also ==
- List of historic rock festivals
- "Homerpalooza", a 1996 episode of The Simpsons
- Alapalooza, a 1993 album by "Weird Al" Yankovic
