= Riot Act Tour =

2003 concert tour by Pearl Jam

- Tour by Pearl Jam
- Location: Australia; Japan; North America
- Associated album: Riot Act
- Start date: February 8, 2003
- End date: July 19, 2003
- Legs: 3
- No. of shows: 58 in North America; 10 in Australia; 5 in Japan; 73 in total

Pearl Jam concert chronology
- Binaural Tour (2000); Riot Act Tour (2003); Vote for Change (2004)

The Riot Act Tour was a concert tour by the American rock band Pearl Jam to support its seventh album, Riot Act.

== History ==
Pearl Jam promoted Riot Act with tours in Australia, Japan, and North America in 2003. The tours were the band's first with keyboardist Boom Gaspar. The two legs of the North American tour focused on the Midwestern United States, the East Coast, and the West Coast. Opening acts for the tours included Johnny Marr, Sparta, Sleater-Kinney, Buzzcocks and Idlewild.

Pearl Jam received much publicity for its energetic politically charged performances during the tour. The band gave a noteworthy performance during the encore of its February 23, 2003 show in Perth at the Burswood Dome where it was joined on stage by Hunters & Collectors frontman Mark Seymour to perform "Throw Your Arms Around Me", a personal favorite of vocalist Eddie Vedder. At many shows during the 2003 North American tour, Vedder performed Riot Act's "Bu$hleaguer", a commentary on President George W. Bush, with a rubber mask of Bush, wearing it at the beginning of the song and then hanging it on a mic stand to allow him to sing. The band made news when it was reported that several fans left after Vedder had "impaled" the Bush mask on his mic stand at the band's April 1, 2003 show in Denver, Colorado at the Pepsi Center. Following a performance of the song at Pearl Jam's April 30, 2003 show in Uniondale, New York at the Nassau Coliseum, the band was met with boos from the crowd and chants of "U-S-A." Vedder responded by defending his right to free speech and the band followed with a performance of The Clash's "Know Your Rights".

The song "Arc" was performed by Vedder at nine shows during the second North American leg of the tour as a tribute to the victims of the Roskilde disaster. On the second leg of the North American tour the band performed a three-day set of Boston shows at the Tweeter Center Boston. Pearl Jam played a completely different set list each night, spanning 105 songs from its catalog with only one repeat between the three shows, the popular concert-ending "Yellow Ledbetter". In May 2003, Pearl Jam extended its North American tour by announcing that it would be playing in Mexico for the first time. Before the first concert on July 17, 2003 in Mexico City at Palacio de los Deportes, the band gave its first press conference in almost ten years. In addition, the third concert was transmitted live on radio and television to all of Latin America for free.

The Australia, Japan, and North America tours were documented by a long series of official bootlegs, all of which were available through the band's official website. A total of six bootlegs were made available in record stores: Perth, Tokyo, State College, Pennsylvania, two shows from Madison Square Garden, and Mansfield, Massachusetts. One of the four warm-up dates was released as a DVD entitled Live at the Showbox, which was made available through the band's website. The first of two shows at Madison Square Garden was released as the Live at the Garden DVD.

== Tour dates ==
Information taken from various sources.

Date	City	Country	Venue	Opening acts	Live album
Warm-up shows
December 5, 2002	Seattle	United States	The Showbox	NEO	
December 6, 2002	Seattle	United States	The Showbox	Steve Earle	Live at the Showbox
December 8, 2002	Seattle	United States	KeyArena	Steve Earle, Brad	
December 9, 2002	Seattle	United States	KeyArena	Brad, Mudhoney	
Pacific leg
February 8, 2003	Brisbane	Australia	Brisbane Entertainment Centre	Johnny Marr	
February 9, 2003	Brisbane	Australia	Brisbane Entertainment Centre	Johnny Marr	
February 11, 2003	Sydney	Australia	Sydney Entertainment Centre	Johnny Marr, Betchadupa	
February 13, 2003	Sydney	Australia	Sydney Entertainment Centre	Johnny Marr, Betchadupa	
February 14, 2003	Sydney	Australia	Sydney Entertainment Centre	Johnny Marr, Betchadupa	
February 16, 2003	Adelaide	Australia	Adelaide Entertainment Centre	Johnny Marr	
February 18, 2003	Melbourne	Australia	Rod Laver Arena	Johnny Marr	
February 19, 2003	Melbourne	Australia	Rod Laver Arena	Johnny Marr	
February 20, 2003	Melbourne	Australia	Rod Laver Arena	Johnny Marr	
February 23, 2003	Perth	Australia	Burswood Dome	Johnny Marr	2/23/03 – Perth, Australia
February 28, 2003	Sendai	Japan	Izumity 21		
March 1, 2003	Yokohama	Japan	Pacifico Yokohama		
March 3, 2003	Tokyo	Japan	Nippon Budokan		3/3/03 – Tokyo, Japan
March 4, 2003	Osaka	Japan	Kōsei Nenkin Kaika		
March 6, 2003	Nagoya	Japan	Nagoyashi Kokaido		
North America leg 1
April 1, 2003	Denver	United States	Pepsi Center	Sleater-Kinney	
April 3, 2003	Oklahoma City	United States	Ford Center	Sleater-Kinney	
April 5, 2003	San Antonio	United States	Verizon Wireless Amphitheater	Sleater-Kinney	
April 6, 2003	The Woodlands	United States	Cynthia Woods Mitchell Pavilion	Sleater-Kinney	
April 8, 2003	New Orleans	United States	UNO Lakefront Arena	Sleater-Kinney	
April 9, 2003	Pelham	United States	Oak Mountain Amphitheater	Sleater-Kinney	
April 11, 2003	West Palm Beach	United States	Sound Advice Amphitheatre	Sleater-Kinney	
April 12, 2003	Orlando	United States	House of Blues		
April 13, 2003	Tampa	United States	St. Pete Times Forum	Sleater-Kinney	
April 15, 2003	Raleigh	United States	Alltel Pavilion at Walnut Creek	Sleater-Kinney	
April 16, 2003	Charlotte	United States	Verizon Wireless Amphitheater	Sleater-Kinney	
April 18, 2003	Antioch	United States	AmSouth Amphitheater	Sleater-Kinney	
April 19, 2003	Atlanta	United States	HiFi Buys Amphitheatre	Sparta	
April 21, 2003	Lexington	United States	Rupp Arena	Sparta	
April 22, 2003	St. Louis	United States	Savvis Center	Sparta	
April 23, 2003	Champaign	United States	Assembly Hall	Sparta	
April 25, 2003	Cleveland	United States	Gund Arena	Sparta	
April 26, 2003	Pittsburgh	United States	Mellon Arena	Sparta	
April 28, 2003	Philadelphia	United States	First Union Spectrum	Sparta	
April 29, 2003	Albany	United States	Pepsi Arena	Sparta	
April 30, 2003	Uniondale	United States	Nassau Coliseum	Sparta	
May 2, 2003	Buffalo	United States	HSBC Arena	Sparta	
May 3, 2003	University Park	United States	Bryce Jordan Center	Sparta	5/3/03 – State College, Pennsylvania
North America leg 2
May 28, 2003	Missoula	United States	Adams Fieldhouse, University of Montana	Idlewild	
May 30, 2003	Vancouver	Canada	General Motors Place	Idlewild	
June 1, 2003	Mountain View	United States	Shoreline Amphitheatre	Idlewild	
June 2, 2003	Irvine	United States	Verizon Wireless Amphitheatre	Idlewild	
June 3, 2003	Irvine	United States	Verizon Wireless Amphitheatre	Idlewild	
June 5, 2003	San Diego	United States	San Diego Sports Arena	Idlewild	
June 6, 2003	Las Vegas	United States	MGM Grand Arena	Idlewild	
June 7, 2003	Phoenix	United States	Cricket Pavilion	Idlewild	
June 9, 2003	Dallas	United States	Smirnoff Music Centre	Idlewild	
June 10, 2003	Little Rock	United States	Alltel Arena	Idlewild	
June 12, 2003	Bonner Springs	United States	Verizon Wireless Amphitheater	Idlewild	
June 13, 2003	Council Bluffs	United States	Mid-America Center	Idlewild	
June 15, 2003	Fargo	United States	Fargodome	Idlewild	
June 16, 2003	Saint Paul	United States	Xcel Energy Center	Idlewild	
June 18, 2003	Chicago	United States	United Center	Idlewild	
June 19, 2003	Cincinnati	United States	~~Riverbend Music Center~~ Cancelled		
June 21, 2003	East Troy	United States	Alpine Valley Music Theatre	Buzzcocks	
June 22, 2003	Noblesville	United States	Verizon Wireless Music Center	Buzzcocks	
June 24, 2003	Columbus	United States	Polaris Amphitheater	Buzzcocks	
June 25, 2003	Clarkston	United States	DTE Energy Music Theatre	Buzzcocks	
June 26, 2003	Clarkston	United States	DTE Energy Music Theatre	Buzzcocks	
June 28, 2003	Toronto	Canada	Molson Amphitheatre	Buzzcocks	
June 29, 2003	Montreal	Canada	Bell Centre	Buzzcocks	
July 1, 2003	Bristow	United States	Nissan Pavilion	Buzzcocks	
July 2, 2003	Mansfield	United States	Tweeter Center Boston	Buzzcocks	
July 3, 2003	Mansfield	United States	Tweeter Center Boston	Buzzcocks	
July 5, 2003	Camden	United States	Tweeter Center at the Waterfront	Buzzcocks	
July 6, 2003	Camden	United States	Tweeter Center at the Waterfront	Buzzcocks	
July 8, 2003	New York City	United States	Madison Square Garden	Buzzcocks	7/8/03 – New York, New York
July 9, 2003	New York City	United States	Madison Square Garden	Sleater-Kinney	7/9/03 – New York, New York
July 11, 2003	Mansfield	United States	Tweeter Center Boston	Sleater-Kinney	7/11/03 – Mansfield, Massachusetts
July 12, 2003	Hershey	United States	Hersheypark Stadium	Sleater-Kinney	
July 14, 2003	Holmdel	United States	PNC Bank Arts Center	Sleater-Kinney	
July 17, 2003	Mexico City	Mexico	Palacio de los Deportes	Sleater-Kinney	
July 18, 2003	Mexico City	Mexico	Palacio de los Deportes	Sleater-Kinney	
July 19, 2003	Mexico City	Mexico	Palacio de los Deportes	Sleater-Kinney	

== Band members ==
Pearl Jam

- Jeff Ament – bass guitar
- Stone Gossard – rhythm guitar
- Mike McCready – lead guitar
- Eddie Vedder – lead vocals, guitar
- Matt Cameron – drums

Additional musicians

- Boom Gaspar – Hammond B3 and keyboards

== Live albums ==
February 23, 2003 Perth Australia- released June 10, 2003

== Songs performed ==
Originals

- "1/2 Full"
- "Alive"
- "All or None"
- "All Those Yesterdays"
- "Animal"
- "Arc"
- "Better Man"
- "Black"
- "Blood"
- "Brain of J."
- "Breakerfall"
- "Breath"
- "Bu$hleaguer"
- "Can't Keep"
- "Corduroy"
- "Cropduster"
- "Daughter"
- "Dead Man"
- "Deep"
- "Dissident"
- "Do the Evolution"
- "Down"
- "Drifting"
- "Elderly Woman Behind the Counter in a Small Town"
- "Evacuation"
- "Even Flow"
- "Faithfull"
- "Footsteps"
- "Free Jazz"
- "Get Right"
- "Ghost"
- "Given to Fly"
- "Glorified G"
- "Go"
- "Gods' Dice"
- "Green Disease"
- "Grievance"
- "Habit"
- "Hail, Hail"
- "Help Help"
- "I Am Mine"
- "I Got Id"
- "Immortality"
- "In Hiding"
- "In My Tree"
- "Indifference"
- "Insignificance"
- "Jeremy"
- "Last Exit"
- "Leatherman"
- "Light Years"
- "Long Road"
- "Love Boat Captain"
- "Low Light"
- "Lukin"
- "Mankind"
- "MFC"
- "Not for You"
- "Nothing as It Seems"
- "Nothingman"
- "Oceans"
- "Of the Girl"
- "Off He Goes"
- "Once"
- "Parting Ways"
- "Porch"
- "Present Tense"
- "Rearviewmirror"
- "Red Mosquito"
- "Release"
- "Rival"
- "Satan's Bed"
- "Save You"
- "Sleight of Hand"
- "Smile"
- "Sometimes"
- "Soon Forget"
- "Spin the Black Circle"
- "State of Love and Trust"
- "Thin Air"
- "Thumbing My Way"
- "Tremor Christ"
- "U"
- "Untitled"
- "W.M.A." (snippet)
- "Wash"
- "Whipping"
- "Why Go"
- "Wishlist"
- "Yellow Ledbetter"
- "You Are"

Covers

- "Androgynous Mind" (Sonic Youth) (snippet)
- "Another Brick in the Wall" (Pink Floyd) (snippet)
- "Atomic Dog" (George Clinton) (snippet)
- "Baba O'Riley" (The Who)
- "Blitzkrieg Bop" (Ramones) (snippet)
- "Blue, Red and Grey" (The Who)
- "Crazy Mary" (Victoria Williams)
- "Crown of Thorns" (Mother Love Bone)
- "Dig Me Out" (Sleater-Kinney) (snippet)
- "Don't Be Shy" (Cat Stevens)
- "Don't Believe In Christmas" (The Sonics)
- "Driven to Tears" (The Police)
- "Everyday" (Buddy Holly)
- "Fortunate Son" (Creedence Clearwater Revival)
- "Fuckin' Up" (Neil Young)
- "Gimme Some Truth" (John Lennon)
- "Give Peace a Chance" (Plastic Ono Band) (snippet)
- "Growin' Up" (Bruce Springsteen)
- "Guantanamera" (Joseíto Fernández)
- "Happy Birthday" (traditional)
- "Highway to Hell" (AC/DC) (snippet)
- "History Never Repeats" (Split Enz)
- "Hunger Strike" (Temple of the Dog)
- "I Am a Patriot" (Steven Van Zandt)
- "I Believe in Miracles" (Ramones)
- "I See Red" (Split Enz)
- "I Won't Back Down" (Tom Petty)
- "I've Been Tired" (Pixies) (snippet)
- "Interstellar Overdrive" (Pink Floyd) (snippet)
- "Jools and Jim" (Pete Townshend) (snippet)
- "The Kids Are Alright" (The Who)
- "Know Your Rights" (The Clash)
- "La Bamba" (Ritchie Valens)
- "Last Kiss" (Wayne Cochran)
- "Leaving Here" (Edward Holland, Jr.)
- "Luck Be a Lady" (Frank Sinatra) (snippet)
- "No More Pain" (Embrace) (snippet)
- "Nobody's Fault But Mine" (Led Zeppelin) (snippet)
- "People Have the Power" (Patti Smith)
- "Rains on Me" (Tom Waits) (snippet)
- "Rockin' in the Free World" (Neil Young)
- "Save It for Later" (The Beat)
- "Should I Stay or Should I Go" (The Clash) (snippet)
- "Soldier of Love (Lay Down Your Arms)" (Arthur Alexander)
- "Song X" (Neil Young) (snippet)
- "Sonic Reducer" (The Dead Boys)
- "Start Me Up" (The Rolling Stones) (snippet)
- "Throw Your Arms Around Me" (Hunters & Collectors)
- "War" (Edwin Starr) (snippet)
- "Why Can't I Touch It?" (Buzzcocks) (snippet)
- "Wild Thing" (The Troggs) (snippet)
- "With My Own Two Hands" (Ben Harper) (snippet)
- "You've Got to Hide Your Love Away" (The Beatles)

== Gallery ==
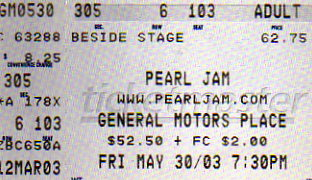
A ticket from the show in Vancouver, British Columbia, Canada on May 30, 2003.
