= 6/6/00 – Cardiff, Wales =

Live album by Pearl Jam
- Released: September 26, 2000
- Recorded: June 6, 2000, Cardiff International Arena, Cardiff, Wales
- Genre: Alternative rock
- Length: 118:44
- Language: English
- Label: Epic

Pearl Jam chronology
| 6/4/00 – Manchester, England (2000) | 6/6/00 – Cardiff, Wales (2000) | 6/8/00 – Paris, France (2000) |

Professional ratings
Review scores
| Source | Rating |
|---|---|
| Allmusic | 3/5 stars |

6/6/00 – Cardiff, Wales is a two-disc live album and the ninth in a series of 72 live bootlegs released by the American alternative rock band Pearl Jam from the band's 2000 Binaural Tour. It was released along with the other official bootlegs from the European leg of the tour on September 26, 2000.

== Overview ==
The album was recorded on June 6, 2000, in Cardiff, Wales at Cardiff International Arena. It was selected by the band as one of 18 "Ape/Man" shows from the tour, which, according to bassist Jeff Ament, were shows the band found "really exciting." Allmusic gave it three out of a possible five stars. Allmusic staff writer Steven McDonald said, "Anyone looking to pick up a representative sampling of this overwhelming anti-bootleg series should have this one on their short list."

== Track listing ==
=== Disc one ===
1. "Nothing as It Seems" (Jeff Ament) – 6:57
2. "Breakerfall" (Eddie Vedder) – 2:42
3. "Gods' Dice" (Ament) – 2:32
4. "Animal" (Dave Abbruzzese, Ament, Stone Gossard, Mike McCready, Vedder) – 3:00
5. "Red Mosquito" (Ament, Gossard, Jack Irons, McCready, Vedder) – 4:18
6. "Insignificance" (Vedder) – 4:20
7. "Corduroy" (Abbruzzese, Ament, Gossard, McCready, Vedder) – 4:36
8. "I Got Id" (Vedder) – 4:01
9. "Alive" (Vedder, Gossard) – 5:09
10. "Given to Fly" (McCready, Vedder) – 3:42
11. "Better Man" (Vedder) – 4:40
12. "Leatherman" (Vedder) – 2:35
13. "Light Years" (Gossard, McCready, Vedder) – 5:33
14. "Pilate" (Ament) – 3:11
15. "Daughter" (Abbruzzese, Ament, Gossard, McCready, Vedder) – 6:04
16. "Do the Evolution" (Gossard, Vedder) – 3:42
17. "Once" (Vedder, Gossard) – 3:42

=== Disc two ===
1. "Go" (Abbruzzese, Ament, Gossard, McCready, Vedder) – 3:51
2. "MFC" (Vedder) – 5:00
3. "Elderly Woman Behind the Counter in a Small Town" (Abbruzzese, Ament, Gossard, McCready, Vedder) – 3:49
4. "Black" (Vedder, Gossard) – 6:05
5. "Immortality" (Abbruzzese, Ament, Gossard, McCready, Vedder) – 6:20
6. "Spin the Black Circle" (Abbruzzese, Ament, Gossard, McCready, Vedder) – 5:36
7. "Even Flow" (Vedder, Gossard) – 6:06
8. "Smile" (Ament, Vedder) – 4:24
9. "Yellow Ledbetter" (Ament, McCready, Vedder) – 6:49

== Personnel ==
Pearl Jam

- Jeff Ament – bass guitar, design concept
- Matt Cameron – drums
- Stone Gossard – guitars
- Mike McCready – guitars
- Eddie Vedder – vocals, guitars

Production

- John Burton – engineering
- Brett Eliason – mixing
- Brad Klausen – design and layout
