= Give Way (album) =

2023 live album by Pearl Jam

Live album by Pearl Jam
- Released: April 22, 2023
- Recorded: March 5, 1998
- Venue: Melbourne Park, Australia
- Genre: Grunge
- Length: 74:32
- Label: Epic; Legacy

Pearl Jam chronology
Gigaton (2020)	Give Way (2023)	Dark Matter (2024)

Give Way is a live album by the American rock band Pearl Jam, released on April 22, 2023, through the Legacy Recordings division of Epic Records as part of Record Store Day 2023. It was recorded on March 5, 1998, at Melbourne Park in Melbourne, Australia, as part of the band's Yield Tour. The album was originally intended for release as a free promotion with purchases of the band's Single Video Theory documentary in 1998, but due to the label and band not clearing the promotion, 50,000 copies were destroyed by the band's label Epic the day before release. The album is an edited version of the concert's 25 songs, originally broadcast via radio and the Internet by Australian radio station Triple J. It is the only official live album by Pearl Jam containing drums by Jack Irons from his time in the band.

== Background ==
The album includes an edited version of the band's performance on March 5, 1998, at Melbourne Park in Melbourne, Australia. The concert was part of the Yield Tour, held to promote their fifth studio album Yield (1998). It was broadcast online and via radio by Australian radio station Triple J, which prompted widespread bootlegging. The album was manufactured and intended for release as a free promotion at US Best Buy stores with purchases of the band's August 1998 Single Video Theory documentary. The band and label had in fact not allowed the promotion, which led to most of the 50,000 CDs that had been pressed being destroyed. Some copies that managed to escape destruction fetched hundreds of dollars online in the years following.

The album is named for the give way sign, used in Australia instead of the yield sign.

== Commercial performance ==
The album appeared at number 27 on the midweek UK Albums Chart, debuting at number 78 on the final chart. It debuted at number 26 on the US Billboard 200 chart for the week dated May 6, 2023.

== Track listing ==
Give Way track listing
No.	Title	Length
1.	"Release"	5:08
2.	"Brain of J."	2:55
3.	"Animal"	2:49
4.	"Faithfull"	4:23
5.	"In My Tree"	4:24
6.	"I Got Id"	4:00
7.	"Corduroy"	5:20
8.	"Even Flow"	5:28
9.	"Spin the Black Circle"	3:16
10.	"Given to Fly"	4:40
11.	"Hail, Hail"	4:00
12.	"MFC"	2:45
13.	"State of Love and Trust"	3:52
14.	"Do the Evolution"	3:37
15.	"Alive"	6:12
16.	"Black"	5:16
17.	"Immortality"	6:27
Total length:		74:32

== Charts ==
Chart performance for Give Way
Chart (2023)	Peak position
Australian Albums (ARIA)	56
Dutch Albums (Album Top 100)	22
Greek Albums (IFPI)	68
Irish Albums (IRMA)	74
Italian Albums (FIMI)	74
New Zealand Albums (RMNZ)	40
Scottish Albums (OCC)	12
Spanish Albums (PROMUSICAE)	69
UK Albums (OCC)	78
UK Rock & Metal Albums (OCC)	5
US Billboard 200	26
US Top Alternative Albums (Billboard)	4
US Top Rock Albums (Billboard)	3
