= 7/9/03 – New York, New York =

Live album by Pearl Jam
- Released: September 16, 2003
- Recorded: July 9, 2003; Madison Square Garden, New York City, New York, United States
- Genre: Alternative rock
- Length: 143:50
- Language: English
- Label: Epic

Pearl Jam chronology
7/8/03 – New York, New York (2003)	7/9/03 – New York, New York (2003)	7/11/03 – Mansfield, Massachusetts (2003)

7/9/03 – New York, New York is a two-disc live album by the American alternative rock band Pearl Jam. It was released to retail stores on September 16, 2003.

== Overview ==
The album was recorded live in New York City at Madison Square Garden on July 9, 2003. It is one of three official bootlegs that Pearl Jam released in stores from the second leg of its North American Riot Act Tour, and it was one of six official bootlegs released overall to retail stores. Allmusic gave it four out of a possible five stars. Allmusic staff writer James Christopher Monger said, "Pearl Jam's second night in New York City features a lean 32-song set that more than makes up for the previous evening's mediocrity." It is also available packaged as a boxed set with the previous night, 7/8/03, also at Madison Square Garden.

== Track listing ==
=== Disc one ===
1. "Crazy Mary" (Victoria Williams) – 6:57
2. "Save You" (Jeff Ament, Matt Cameron, Stone Gossard, Mike McCready, Eddie Vedder) – 3:25
3. "Hail, Hail" (Gossard, Vedder, Ament, McCready) – 3:15
4. "Whipping" (Dave Abbruzzese, Ament, Gossard, McCready, Vedder) – 4:06
5. "Corduroy" (Abbruzzese, Ament, Gossard, McCready, Vedder) – 4:36
6. "Red Mosquito" (Ament, Gossard, Jack Irons, McCready, Vedder) – 4:15
7. "Dissident" (Abbruzzese, Ament, Gossard, McCready, Vedder) – 3:31
8. "I Am Mine" (Vedder) – 3:49
9. "Get Right" (Cameron) – 2:50
10. "Given to Fly" (McCready, Vedder) – 3:42
11. "Evacuation" (Cameron, Vedder) – 3:06
12. "Even Flow" (Vedder, Gossard) – 9:33
13. "I Believe in Miracles" (Dee Dee Ramone, Daniel Rey) – 3:23
14. "Untitled" (Vedder) – 3:08
15. "MFC" (Vedder) – 2:38
16. "Deep" (Vedder, Gossard, Ament) – 4:22
17. "Present Tense" (McCready, Vedder) – 7:13

=== Disc two ===
1. "Nothingman" (Vedder, Ament) – 4:43
2. "State of Love and Trust" (Vedder, McCready, Ament) – 3:28
3. "Porch" (Vedder) – 7:20
4. "Encore Break" – 7:22
5. "You've Got to Hide Your Love Away" (John Lennon, Paul McCartney) – 2:46
6. "Elderly Woman Behind the Counter in a Small Town" (Abbruzzese, Ament, Gossard, McCready, Vedder) – 3:58
7. "Glorified G" (Abbruzzese, Ament, Gossard, McCready, Vedder) – 3:37
8. "All or None" (Gossard, Vedder) – 5:37
9. "Do the Evolution" (Gossard, Vedder) – 3:37
10. "Alive" (Vedder, Gossard) – 6:02
11. "Encore Break" – 0:55
12. "Go" (Abbruzzese, Ament, Gossard, McCready, Vedder) – 2:56
13. "Know Your Rights" (Mick Jones, Joe Strummer) – 3:41
14. "Rockin' in the Free World" (Neil Young) – 7:13
15. "Yellow Ledbetter" (Ament, McCready, Vedder) – 6:46

== Personnel ==
Pearl Jam

- Jeff Ament – bass guitar, design concept
- Matt Cameron – drums
- Stone Gossard – guitars
- Mike McCready – guitars
- Eddie Vedder – vocals, guitars

Additional musicians and production

- Ed Brooks at RFI CD Mastering – mastering
- John Burton – engineering
- Brett Eliason – mixing
- Boom Gaspar – Hammond B3, Fender Rhodes
- Brad Klausen – design and layout

== Chart positions ==
Chart (2003)	Position
Top Internet Albums	13
