= 7/11/03 – Mansfield, Massachusetts =

Live album by Pearl Jam
- Released: September 16, 2003
- Recorded: July 11, 2003, Tweeter Center Boston, Mansfield, Massachusetts, United States
- Genre: Alternative rock
- Length: 204:47
- Language: English
- Label: Epic

Pearl Jam chronology
7/9/03 – New York, New York (2003)	7/11/03 – Mansfield, Massachusetts (2003)	7/12/03 – Hershey, Pennsylvania (2003)

Professional ratings
Review scores
Source	Rating
Allmusic	4/5 stars

7/11/03 – Mansfield, Massachusetts is a three-disc live album by the American alternative rock band Pearl Jam. It was released to retail stores on September 16, 2003.

== Overview ==
The album was recorded live in Mansfield, Massachusetts at the Tweeter Center on July 11, 2003. The show is notable because it was the last of three nights at the Tweeter Center in which the band played 82 originals and 12 covers, with the only repeat being "Yellow Ledbetter". The band's stated goal over these three nights was to play every song it had played on the entire tour so far, without repeats as noted. To this end, the first disc was an acoustic band set that Pearl Jam played before even openers Sleater-Kinney got on stage; the second and third discs are the regular set following Sleater-Kinney. This encompassing storyline accounts for otherwise mysterious stage remarks that vocalist Eddie Vedder keeps making about "getting to the task at hand." The song "Arc" off of Riot Act was played at the beginning of the second encore, right before "I Believe in Miracles", but is not included on this or any bootleg, as the song is meant as a tribute to the nine fans who died at the band's 2000 Roskilde Festival performance.

It is one of three official bootlegs that Pearl Jam released in stores from the second leg of its North American Riot Act Tour, and it was one of six official bootlegs released overall to retail stores. Allmusic gave it four out of a possible five stars. Allmusic staff writer James Christopher Monger said, "Frontman Eddie Vedder sounds tired yet incrementally possessed as the show continues." At 47 songs, in both number of songs and length of the show, this is the longest Pearl Jam show ever, surpassing the previous longest, 5/3/03 – State College, Pennsylvania.

== Track listing ==
=== Disc one ===
1. "Long Road" (Eddie Vedder) – 6:18
2. "Of the Girl" (Stone Gossard) – 5:40
3. "Sometimes" (Vedder) – 2:46
4. "Off He Goes" (Vedder) – 5:43
5. "All Those Yesterdays" (Gossard) – 4:53
6. "Driftin'" (Vedder) – 2:32
7. "Thin Air" (Gossard) – 3:54
8. "Sleight of Hand" (Jeff Ament, Vedder) – 4:42
9. "Footsteps" (Gossard, Vedder) – 5:31
10. "All or None" (Gossard, Vedder) – 5:28
11. "Parting Ways" (Vedder) – 4:42
12. "Indifference" (Dave Abbruzzese, Ament, Gossard, Mike McCready, Vedder) – 5:08

=== Disc two ===
1. "Can't Keep" (Vedder) – 4:16
2. "Breakerfall" (Vedder) – 2:33
3. "Brain of J." (McCready, Vedder) – 2:34
4. "Spin the Black Circle" (Abbruzzese, Ament, Gossard, McCready, Vedder) – 2:54
5. "Ghost" (Ament, Vedder) – 3:04
6. "Green Disease" (Vedder) – 2:44
7. "Tremor Christ" (Abbruzzese, Ament, Gossard, McCready, Vedder) – 4:16
8. "Given to Fly" (McCready, Vedder) – 4:35
9. "Nothing as It Seems" (Ament) – 5:31
10. "Cropduster" (Matt Cameron, Vedder) – 4:46
11. "Faithfull" (McCready, Vedder) – 4:48
12. "Why Go" (Vedder, Ament) – 3:18
13. "Wishlist" (Vedder) – 10:05
14. "Leatherman" (Vedder) – 2:43
15. "Nothingman" (Vedder, Ament) – 4:49
16. "Better Man" (Vedder) – 4:41
17. "1/2 Full" (Ament, Vedder) – 5:01

=== Disc three ===
1. "Untitled" (Vedder) – 2:09
2. "MFC" (Vedder) – 2:34
3. "Blood" (Abbruzzese, Ament, Gossard, McCready, Vedder) – 3:04
4. "Encore Break" – 1:00
5. "Breath" (Vedder, Gossard) – 5:29
6. "Habit" (Vedder) – 4:03
7. "Down" (Gossard, McCready, Vedder) – 6:05
8. "Mankind" (Gossard) – 3:53
9. "U" (Vedder) – 3:02
10. "Black" (Vedder, Gossard) – 8:31
11. "Jeremy" (Vedder, Ament) – 5:37
12. "Encore Break" – 3:16
13. "I Believe in Miracles" (Dee Dee Ramone, Daniel Rey) – 3:10
14. "Know Your Rights" (Mick Jones, Joe Strummer) – 4:27
15. "Fortunate Son" (John Fogerty) – 3:51
16. "Rockin' in the Free World" (Neil Young) – 6:19
17. "One Note" – 0:49
18. "Encore Break" – 1:17
19. "Yellow Ledbetter" (Ament, McCready, Vedder) – 6:16

== Personnel ==
Pearl Jam

- Jeff Ament – bass guitar, design concept
- Matt Cameron – drums
- Stone Gossard – guitars
- Mike McCready – guitars
- Eddie Vedder – vocals, guitars, ukulele

Additional musicians and production

- Ed Brooks at RFI CD Mastering – mastering
- John Burton – engineering
- Brett Eliason – mixing
- Boom Gaspar – Hammond B3, Fender Rhodes
- Brad Klausen – design and layout

== Chart positions ==
Chart (2003)	Position
Top Internet Albums	2
