= 3/3/03 – Tokyo, Japan =

Live album by Pearl Jam
- Released: June 10, 2003
- Recorded: March 3, 2003
- Venue: Nippon Budokan, Tokyo, Japan
- Genre: Alternative rock
- Length: 140:06
- Language: English
- Label: Epic

Pearl Jam chronology
3/1/03 – Yokohama, Japan (2003)	3/3/03 – Tokyo, Japan (2003)	3/4/03 – Osaka, Japan (2003)

Professional ratings
Review scores
Source	Rating
AllMusic	4/5 stars

3/3/03 – Tokyo, Japan is a two-disc live album by the American alternative rock band Pearl Jam. It was released to retail stores on June 10, 2003.

== Overview ==
The album was recorded live at the Nippon Budokan in Tokyo on March 3, 2003. It is the only Pearl Jam official bootleg they released in stores from the Japanese leg of its Riot Act Tour, and it was one of six official bootlegs released overall to retail stores. AllMusic gave it four out of a possible five stars. AllMusic staff writer Jason Birchmeier said that "the Tokyo show is a particularly noteworthy one, if not simply for its retail availability, then for its political undertones as well as its emphasis on the older songs." It debuted at number 182 on the Billboard 200 album chart. The song "Daughter" at the end contains a short cover of the Edwin Starr song "War".

== Track listing ==
=== Disc one ===
1. "Release" (Jeff Ament, Stone Gossard, Dave Krusen, Mike McCready, Eddie Vedder) – 5:57
2. "Can't Keep" (Vedder) – 3:44
3. "Even Flow" (Vedder, Gossard) – 5:58
4. "Save You" (Ament, Matt Cameron, Gossard, McCready, Vedder) – 3:39
5. "Hail, Hail" (Gossard, Vedder, Ament, McCready) – 4:26
6. "Dissident" (Dave Abbruzzese, Ament, Gossard, McCready, Vedder) – 3:44
7. "Love Boat Captain" (Boom Gaspar, Vedder) – 5:18
8. "Elderly Woman Behind the Counter in a Small Town" (Abbruzzese, Ament, Gossard, McCready, Vedder) – 3:25
9. "Given to Fly" (McCready, Vedder) – 3:50
10. "Lukin" (Vedder) – 0:57
11. "Not for You" (Abbruzzese, Ament, Gossard, McCready, Vedder) – 5:34
12. "Daughter" (Abbruzzese, Ament, Gossard, McCready, Vedder) – 7:29
13. "You Are" (Cameron, Vedder) – 6:50
14. "I Am Mine" (Vedder) – 3:34
15. "Better Man" (Vedder) – 4:32

=== Disc two ===
1. "Corduroy" (Abbruzzese, Ament, Gossard, McCready, Vedder) – 5:01
2. "Do the Evolution" (Gossard, Vedder) – 4:00
3. "Blood" (Abbruzzese, Ament, Gossard, McCready, Vedder) – 2:56
4. "Encore Break" – 0:32
5. "Bu$hleaguer" (Gossard, Vedder) – 4:47
6. "Know Your Rights" (Mick Jones, Joe Strummer) – 3:38
7. "Go" (Abbruzzese, Ament, Gossard, McCready, Vedder) – 3:11
8. "Black" (Vedder, Gossard) – 7:39
9. "U" (Vedder) – 3:32
10. "Breath" (Vedder, Gossard) – 5:06
11. "Rearviewmirror" (Abbruzzese, Ament, Gossard, McCready, Vedder) – 8:17
12. "Encore Break" – 1:02
13. "Don't Be Shy" (Cat Stevens) – 3:38
14. "Soon Forget" (Vedder) – 2:17
15. "Last Kiss" (Wayne Cochran) – 3:50
16. "Yellow Ledbetter" (Ament, McCready, Vedder) – 5:30
17. "Alive" (Vedder, Gossard) – 6:13

== Personnel ==
=== Pearl Jam ===
- Jeff Ament – bass guitar, design concept
- Matt Cameron – drums
- Stone Gossard – guitars
- Mike McCready – guitars
- Eddie Vedder – vocals, guitars, ukulele

=== Additional musicians and production ===
- Ed Brooks at RFI CD Mastering – mastering
- John Burton – engineering
- Brett Eliason – mixing
- Boom Gaspar – Hammond B3, Fender Rhodes
- Brad Klausen – design and layout

== Charts ==
Chart (2003)	Peak position
US Billboard 200	182
