= Silverlake Conservatory of Music =

Nonprofit organization

Silverlake Conservatory of Music is a nonprofit educational organization formed in California. It was founded in 2001 by the Red Hot Chili Peppers bassist, Flea, and the Chili Peppers collaborator Tree to foster music education. The chili Peppers vocalist Anthony Kiedis is also on the board.

The facility organizes an annual "Hullabaloo", one of which featured performances by Red Hot Chili Peppers, Eddie Vedder and Charlie Haden raised $1 million for the Conservatory during an August 24, 2011, performance at Club Nokia.

Flea released his debut solo EP, Helen Burns, on July 19, 2012, through Silverlake's website. The EP features an appearance by co-founder Keith Barry, Patti Smith, the former Chili Peppers drummer Jack Irons, current Chili Peppers drummer Chad Smith and the Silverlake kids' and adults' choir directed by S.J. Hasman.

On November 2, 2019, the Chili Peppers performed a charity event for the Conservatory with Eddie Vedder. This performance was the band's final show with guitarist Josh Klinghoffer.

In June 2021, the choir featured on a compilation tribute album for Andy Gill, lead guitarist of post-punk band Gang of Four who died in February 2020 performing "Not Great Men", from their first album Entertainment!. Other musicians featured on the album include IDLES, Gary Numan, La Roux, The Dandy Warhols and Killing Joke.

A group of students at the school under the name the Silverlake Conservatory of Music All-Stars released tribute singles and an EP to the Pretenders in May 2025, to Neil Young in July 2025 and to Red Hot Chili Peppers in September 2025.

A 25th anniversary benefit concert will be held on October 17, 2026 at the Hollywood Palladium and unlike previous benefits, which were private, this will be open to the public. Red Hot Chili Peppers, Dave Grohl, Vince Staples and Marc Maron along with others yet to be announced, are scheduled to appear.
