= Low light =

Low light, lowlights, or Low Light may refer to

- Another term for dimness
- Darkening strands of hair, the opposite of hair highlights
- "Low Light" (Pearl Jam song)
- "Low Light" (Idlewild song), from the album Hope Is Important
- Low-Light (G.I. Joe), a fictional character in the G.I. Joe universe
- "Low Lights", a song by Kanye West

== See also ==
- Low light level television
- Low-light photography
  - Night photography
