= Helen Burns (EP) =

EP by Flea
- Released: July 19, 2012
- Recorded: 2007
- Length: 26:07
- Label: Org Music
- Producers: Flea, Chris Warren

Flea chronology
Helen Burns (2012)	Honora (2026)

Helen Burns is the debut EP by Flea, bassist from Red Hot Chili Peppers, which was released July 19, 2012 at a "name your own price" policy through the Silverlake Conservatory of Music website. The EP was also released to all major digital download outlets on August 9, 2012. The EP marks the first solo release by Flea who has previously only released solo work on soundtracks. The EP is almost all instrumental except for an appearance by Patti Smith on the title track and a choir on the final track.

Additionally, there was a limited edition 180-gram vinyl that Flea personally signed and also includes an actual piece of a bass string that Flea used while touring. Only 900 copies were available. The vinyl can also be ordered on the Silverlake Conservatory website. Regular vinyl and CD release followed in February 2013.

== Background ==
The EP was recorded in 2007 by Flea and Chris Warren, drum technician and touring keyboard player for the Red Hot Chili Peppers. Flea said he had no plans for the album to be anything but to just record it in the back room at his house following a long Chili Peppers tour and as a way for Warren to learn how to be a sound engineer. The title of the EP, according to Flea, comes from a character in the 1847 novel Jane Eyre. Flea said "the beauty of Helen Burns is a quality I look for in all human beings. Burns is always someone who is present with me and whose highest ideals resonate in the deepest experiences of my life".

Flea commented on the release of the EP by saying “Hi people who like The Red Hot Chili Peppers! I love you a lot! Mucho! Just wanted to give you a heads up about this little record 'Helen Burns' I am putting out on the Silverlake Conservatory website. Warning! It is not a Chili Pepper record. It does not have songs that are like the Chili Peppers at all. It is a mostly instrumental, weird and arty record, the music is mostly just me creating soundscapes that are very emotional for me, but certainly not for everyone! Just me tripping out at home. I am putting it out to raise money for The Silverlake Conservatory of Music a community based non profit music school that I am an integral part of. There you have it. See you all soon I hope!"

== Track listing ==
All songs were written by Flea, except "Helen Burns" which was co-written with Patti Smith.

No.	Title	Length
1.	"333"	8:03
2.	"Pedestal of Infamy"	3:12
3.	"A Little Bit of Sanity"	1:29
4.	"Helen Burns"	3:02
5.	"333 Revisited"	7:32
6.	"Lovelovelove"	3:32
Total length:		26:50

== Personnel ==
- Flea - bass, piano, trumpet, double bass, synthesizers, drum machine, programming, organ, mellotron, melodica, percussion
- Jack Irons - snare roll (1), drums (6)
- Stella Mozgawa - drums (2,3)
- Chad Smith - drums (6)
- Patti Smith - vocals (4)
- Keith "Tree" Barry - harmonica (6)
- Silverlake Conservatory kids and adult choir directed by S.J. Hasman (6)

Production

- Clara Balzary - album artwork
- Greg Fidelman - mixing (all tracks except 5)
- Ryan Hewitt - mixing (5)
- Sara Killion - mixing (5)
- Chris Warren - sound engineer
