= Know Your Rights =

Single by the Clash

from the album Combat Rock
- B-side: "First Night Back in London"
- Released: 23 April 1982
- Genre: Rockabilly
- Length: 3:41
- Label: CBS
- Songwriters: Joe Strummer; Mick Jones
- Producer: The Clash

The Clash singles chronology
"This Is Radio Clash" (1981)	"Know Your Rights" (1982)	"Rock the Casbah" (1982)

"Know Your Rights" is a song by the English rock band the Clash, released on 23 April 1982 as the first single from their fifth studio album, Combat Rock, three weeks prior to the release of the album.

The song begins with the words "This is a public service announcement... with guitar!" The structure of the song revolves around the rights held by the poor and disenfranchised, in which the speaker of the song, presumably a villainous civil servant (whose identity is assumed in the song by vocalist Joe Strummer), names the three actual rights. At the end, the notion that more rights should be granted is rebuffed by the speaker.

The three are:

1. "The right not to be killed. Murder is a crime, unless it is done by a policeman, or an aristocrat".
2. "The right to food money, providing, of course, you don't mind a little investigation, humiliation, and if you cross your fingers, rehabilitation".
3. "The right to free speech (as long as you're not dumb enough to actually try it)".

== Cover versions ==
"Know Your Rights" has been performed live many times by Pearl Jam, most notably during their Riot Act Tour in 2003, and it also has been recorded on their live albums 7/11/03 – Mansfield, Massachusetts, 7/9/03 – New York, New York, and 3/3/03 – Tokyo, Japan.

== Track listing ==
7" vinyl

1. "Know Your Rights" (Joe Strummer/Mick Jones) – 3:35
2. "First Night Back in London" (The Clash) – 3:00

== Charts ==
Chart	Peak position
UK Singles (Official Charts)	43
