= To the Quick =

Studio album by the Buck Pets
- Released: 1993
- Studio: Oz, Baltimore
- Genre: Hard rock, punk rock, pop rock
- Label: Restless
- Producer: Ted Niceley, the Buck Pets

The Buck Pets chronology
Mercurotones (1990)	To the Quick (1993)	RARES (and unreleased) (2010)

To the Quick is the third album by the American band the Buck Pets, released in 1993. They supported it by touring with Scrawl. The first single was "Living Is the Biggest Thing". The Buck Pets broke up shortly after finishing their promotional duties.

== Production ==
Recorded at Oz Studios in Baltimore, the album was produced by Ted Niceley and the band. The drummer Tony Alba left prior to the recording sessions and was replaced by Ricky Pearson. The band wanted to return to their pre-Island Records punk sound; they were also influenced by the production on PJ Harvey's Rid of Me. The lyrics often deal with disappointment and learning to persevere. "Bargain" is a cover of the Who song.

== Critical reception ==
Professional ratings
Review scores
Source	Rating
AllMusic	3/5 stars
The Boston Phoenix	1.5/4 stars
Ox-Fanzine	2/6 stars
Rolling Stone	3/5 stars

The Washington Post called the Buck Pets "a solid band that draws both on metal and Replacements-style hard-pop-rock" but opined that the cover of "Bargain" was the best song on the album. The Sun Sentinel praised the "tight, smart songs that rock with real conviction", describing them as "swift and clever in the Soul Asylum tradition". The San Diego Union-Tribune concluded that "the Buck Pets combine the brash energy of the rockers they still are with the subtle finesse of the pros they've learned to be."

The Boston Phoenix stated that the band lacked a distinctive style of "souped-up punk pop". Rolling Stone, in its syndicated column, said that the Buck Pets "sound tougher than ever." The Tallahassee Democrat labeled them "a garage band with some savvy, playing heavily fuzzed pop music in straightforward fashion."

== Track listing ==
No.	Title	Length
1.	"Living Is the Biggest Thing"
2.	"Shave"
3.	"Walk It to the Pay Phone"
4.	"To the Quick"
5.	"Nothing's Ever Gonna Be Alright Again"
6.	"The Smiler with a Knife"
7.	"C'mon Baby"
8.	"Crutch"
9.	"Rocket to You"
10.	"Car Chase"
11.	"Worldwide Smile"
12.	"Manatee"
13.	"Bargain"
