= Sun-60 =

- Origin: Los Angeles, California
- Genres: Alternative rock
- Years active: 1987 - 1996
- Labels: Epic Records
- Past members: Joan Jones (vocals, songwriter, founder); David Russo (guitars, keyboards, vocals, songwriter, founder); Glen Holmen (bass); David Raven (drums); Craig Levitz (drums); Jack Irons (drums); Dave Navarro (guitars); Mike Lawrence (drums); Bret Jensen (guitars); Eddie Russo (bass)

Sun-60 (later Sun 60 without the hyphen) were a Los Angeles Alternative rock band from 1987 to 1996.

The band was notable for the vocals of Joan Jones, the guitar riffs of David Russo, clever song-writing, and an eclectic combination of styles, including folk, alt rock, pop, and blues.

Despite a cult following, and moderate success both as a touring live act and on record, the band split in 1996.

== History ==
Sun-60 began as an acoustic folk duo, composed of Joan Jones and David Russo playing under the name Far Cry. Gradually their sound became harder-edged, and they added various musicians to form a rock rhythm section.

They were signed by Epic Records in 1990 and released the eponymous Sun-60 in 1992. Sun-60 is a glossily-produced, high-energy folk/pop/rock album showcasing Jones' voice and hook-laden songwriting.

Only (1993) is primarily blues-based hard rock, although folk and pop influences are still audible. The album features guest performances from several notable musicians such as Dave Navarro.

Headjoy, released in 1995 is grungier.

Jones and Russo split in 1996. Russo concentrated on film scores.

Jones released the solo album Starlite Criminal in 1998. It has much the same sound as Headjoy, and might be considered "the fourth Sun-60 album". She continues to perform and to release singles and collections from her web sites as well as her additional albums "Atlanta Sessions", "Velvet Underdog" and "Brown Blonde". Joan Jones and Bret Jensen who was a guitarist in the band SUN 60 and with Joan Jones now, collaborated and sang together for the song "Heartbeat" in the recent feature film "P.S. I Love You", starring Gerard Butler from "300" and Academy Award-winning actress Hilary Swank. Jones is currently at work on a new album due out in 2009.

As of January 2009, Joan Jones is on a nationwide tour with Big Head Todd and The Monsters from February 2009 through May 2009, as their opening act for various dates with them.

== Discography ==
Title	Release date	Label
Sun-60	July 1991	Epic Records
Only	June 1, 1993	Epic Records
Headjoy	August 1, 1995	Epic Records
