= 5/3/03 – State College, Pennsylvania =

Live album by Pearl Jam
- Released: July 15, 2003
- Recorded: May 3, 2003, Bryce Jordan Center, University Park, Pennsylvania, United States
- Genre: Alternative rock
- Length: 190:22
- Language: English
- Label: Epic

Pearl Jam chronology
5/2/03 – Buffalo, New York (2003)	5/3/03 – State College, Pennsylvania (2003)	5/28/03 – Missoula, Montana (2003)

Professional ratings
Review scores
Source	Rating
Allmusic	3/5 stars

5/3/03 – State College, Pennsylvania is a three-disc live album by the American alternative rock band Pearl Jam. It was released to retail stores on July 15, 2003.

== Overview ==
The album was recorded live in University Park, Pennsylvania at the Bryce Jordan Center at Penn State University on May 3, 2003. Since this was the last show of the tour's first leg, the band decided to make it, in the words of vocalist Eddie Vedder, "the longest Pearl Jam show ever played." This has since been surpassed by the show at the Tweeter Center in Mansfield, Massachusetts on July 11, 2003.

It is the only official bootleg that Pearl Jam released in stores from the first leg of its North American Riot Act Tour, and it was one of six official bootlegs released overall to retail stores. Allmusic gave it three out of a possible five stars. Allmusic staff writer Jason Birchmeier said, "It's a fittingly spirited finale to a spirited trek across America during a spirited time by a spirited band led by an especially spirited frontman." It debuted at number 169 on the Billboard 200 album chart.

== Track listing ==
=== Disc one ===
1. "Release" (Jeff Ament, Stone Gossard, Dave Krusen, Mike McCready, Eddie Vedder) – 5:50
2. "Save You" (Ament, Matt Cameron, Gossard, McCready, Vedder) – 3:34
3. "Animal" (Dave Abbruzzese, Ament, Gossard, McCready, Vedder) – 2:37
4. "Corduroy" (Abbruzzese, Ament, Gossard, McCready, Vedder) – 6:02
5. "Cropduster" (Cameron, Vedder) – 3:51
6. "Small Town" (Abbruzzese, Ament, Gossard, McCready, Vedder) – 3:36
7. "Even Flow" (Vedder, Gossard) – 7:18
8. "Grievance" (Vedder) – 3:26
9. "I Am Mine" (Vedder) – 3:39
10. "Improv #1" – 3:08
11. "Rearviewmirror" (Abbruzzese, Ament, Gossard, McCready, Vedder) – 9:20
12. "Nothingman" (Vedder, Ament) – 4:55
13. "Daughter" (Abbruzzese, Ament, Gossard, McCready, Vedder) – 8:55

=== Disc two ===
1. "Lukin" (Vedder) – 1:16
2. "Whipping" (Abbruzzese, Ament, Gossard, McCready, Vedder) – 2:50
3. "MFC" (Vedder) – 2:33
4. "Jeremy" (Vedder, Ament) – 6:04
5. "Improv #2" – 1:59
6. "Blood" (Abbruzzese, Ament, Gossard, McCready, Vedder) – 2:55
7. "Encore Break" – 2:23
8. "You've Got to Hide Your Love Away" (John Lennon, Paul McCartney) – 4:27
9. "Gimme Some Truth" (Lennon) – 4:17
10. "Breath" (Vedder, Gossard) – 5:10
11. "Do the Evolution" (Gossard, Vedder) – 4:02
12. "Black" (Vedder, Gossard) – 8:25
13. "Alive" (Vedder, Gossard) – 6:34
14. "Encore Break" – 2:05
15. "Last Exit" (Abbruzzese, Ament, Gossard, McCready, Vedder) – 3:46
16. "Mankind" (Gossard) – 3:37

=== Disc three ===
1. "Down" (Gossard, McCready, Vedder) – 3:50
2. "Better Man" (Vedder)/"Save It for Later" (The Beat) – 10:39
3. "Satan's Bed" (Vedder, Gossard) – 3:37
4. "Leaving Here" (Brian Holland, Lamont Dozier, Edward Holland, Jr.) – 3:06
5. "Encore Break" – 1:31
6. "Crazy Mary" (Victoria Williams) – 8:29
7. "Porch" (Vedder) – 10:49
8. "Fortunate Son" (John Fogerty) – 3:08
9. "Rockin' in the Free World" (Neil Young) – 10:48
10. "Yellow Ledbetter" (Ament, McCready, Vedder) – 5:51

== Personnel ==
Pearl Jam

- Jeff Ament – bass guitar, design concept
- Matt Cameron – drums
- Stone Gossard – guitars
- Mike McCready – guitars
- Eddie Vedder – vocals, guitars

Additional musicians and production

- Ed Brooks at RFI CD Mastering – mastering
- John Burton – engineering
- Brett Eliason – mixing
- Boom Gaspar – Hammond B3, Fender Rhodes
- Brad Klausen – design and layout

== Chart positions ==
Chart (2003)	Position
Top Internet Albums	14
US Billboard 200	169
