= Mercurotones =

Studio album by the Buck Pets
- Released: 1990
- Genre: Hard rock
- Label: Island
- Producer: Michael Beinhorn, Dust Brothers

The Buck Pets chronology
The Buck Pets (1989)	Mercurotones (1990)	To the Quick (1993)

Mercurotones is the second album by the American band the Buck Pets, released in 1990. They supported it by opening for Jane's Addiction and then Neil Young on North American tours. "Libertine" peaked at No. 25 on Billboard's Modern Rock Tracks chart. The album sold around 35,000 copies in its first six months of release, which led Island Records to not renew the band's option.

== Production ==
The album was produced by Michael Beinhorn, who worked with the band to keep an unpolished sound. Its songs were written by frontmen Andy Thompson and Chris Savage. The Buck Pets were influenced primarily by the Replacements; Thompson briefly attended school with Tommy Stinson. The lyrics to most of the songs were of a personal nature, as the band wanted to be direct and relatable to their listeners. Jack Irons played drums on the majority of the tracks, as Island Records was not happy with the ability of the band's drummer, Tony Alba. They used a horn section on "Libertine", which was produced by the Dust Brothers.

== Critical reception ==
Professional ratings
Review scores
Source	Rating
AllMusic	4.5/5 stars
Calgary Herald	B+
Chicago Tribune	3/4 stars
The Daily Illini	2.875/5 stars
The Daily Tar Heel	3.5/5 stars
The Tampa Tribune	3/4 stars

The Washington Post called the album "semi-raw, semi-catchy hard rock that reveals itself on 'Ave' F Blues', the Mercurotune that most wants to be a Replacements song (and almost makes it)." The Los Angeles Times noted the "bone-crunching riffs, tunes that are actually tunes and not-a-boy-but-not-a-man lyrics that largely manage to avoid cliches", and stated that "the band relies on songs as much as sonics". The Chicago Tribune said that the album "has its share of gonzo rock: big slabs of guitar that roar and fade, bodacious drumming and lunging bass riffs", while praising the Buck Pets' decision to take musical chances on some tracks.

The Calgary Herald labeled Mercurotones "12 bloozy numbers—with a great ballad thrown in—stripped to their metalesque essentials that flounce, swagger and cajole you into believing the American garage is the quintessential birthplace of rock." The New York Times said that "the Buck Pets have honed their songs with pop concision, even when they defy pop formula."

In 2009, Spin included the Buck Pets on its list "Unsung: The 100 Greatest Bands You've (Probably) Never Heard", and said that Mercurotones was "ruggedly catchy" and "just a little slick".

== Track listing ==
No.	Title	Length
1.	"Moon Goddess (R. T. Cocaine Blues)"
2.	"Pearls"
3.	"PM – Sick of It All"
4.	"Some Hesitation"
5.	"Five O'Clock or Thursday – Up to You"
6.	"Ave F Blues – Down Through the Avenue"
7.	"Libertine"
8.	"Ready to Break – I'm So Tired"
9.	"Shameless"
10.	"Brother – Take These Dreams"
11.	"Guilty – Where's My Head"
12.	"Hey Sunshine"
