= Attention Dimension =

Studio album by Jack Irons
- Released: September 7, 2004
- Recorded: 1999–2004
- Genre: Experimental rock
- Language: English
- Label: Breaching Whale
- Producer: Jack Irons

Jack Irons chronology
Attention Dimension (2004)	No Heads Are Better Than One (2010)

Professional ratings
Review scores
Source	Rating
Allmusic	3.5/5 stars

Attention Dimension is the first solo studio album by drummer Jack Irons. It was released on September 7, 2004, through Breaching Whale.

== Overview ==
Irons started creating his first pieces of drum music in 1994, but it was not until fall 1999, about a year after he left Pearl Jam, that he seriously began recording himself for a possible solo album, taking time out to record a new Eleven album, which the band released in 2003. Attention Dimension includes collaborations from friends and former bandmates like Alain Johannes, Natasha Shneider, Flea, Eddie Vedder, Stone Gossard, Jeff Ament, and Les Claypool. Vedder contributed vocals to a cover of Pink Floyd's "Shine On You Crazy Diamond". The album was produced by Irons. The album was mixed by Johannes and Adam Kasper. Johnny Loftus of Allmusic said, "There's no frontman hooting here, no lead guitar prima donna drama. Instead, Attention Dimension is the drummer's chance to be in the bright white klieg light. Give him a chance, will ya?"

== Track listing ==
All lyrics are written by Jack Irons, except where noted; all music is composed by Irons, except where noted.

No.	Title	Lyrics	Music	Length
1.	"Jackie Groove"			2:29
2.	"Suluhiana"			7:33
3.	"Ocean's Light"			4:46
4.	"Hearing It Doubled"		Irons, Alain Johannes	3:46
5.	"Shine On You Crazy Diamond"	Roger Waters	David Gilmour, Waters, Richard Wright	5:12
6.	"Underwater Circus Music"			14:09
7.	"Dunes"			3:31
8.	"Come Running"			4:55
9.	"Water Song"			12:12
10.	"Breaking Sea"		Irons, Johannes	5:30
11.	"Aquaman's Electric Band"			4:48

== Personnel ==
- Jack Irons – drums, percussion, synthesizer, keyboard bass, organ, organ bass, horns, sounds, guitar, vocals, production, engineering, artwork

Additional musicians and production

- Jeff Ament – fretless bass
- Charles Bates – layout design, logo design
- Les Claypool – electric bass
- Flea – electric bass
- Stone Gossard – guitar
- Bernie Grundman – mastering
- Sam Hofstedt, Floyd Reitsman – engineering
- Alain Johannes – vocals, marxophone, banjo, sounds, guitar, slide guitar, electric mridangam, horns, sigfiddle, tambourine, electric santoor, sarod, flute, soprano saxophone, engineering, mixing
- Adam Kasper – mixing
- Natasha Shneider – electric bass, piano, vocals, keyboards
- Eddie Vedder – vocals
