= Who You Are (Pearl Jam song) =

1996 single by Pearl Jam

Single by Pearl Jam

from the album No Code
- B-side: "Habit"
- Released: July 30, 1996
- Genre: Alternative rock; psychedelia; raga rock
- Length: 3:50
- Label: Epic
- Songwriters: Stone Gossard; Jack Irons; Eddie Vedder
- Producers: Brendan O'Brien; Pearl Jam

Pearl Jam singles chronology
"I Got Id" (1995)	"Who You Are" (1996)	"Hail, Hail" (1996)

Audio sample
- file; help

"Who You Are" is a song by American rock band Pearl Jam. Featuring lyrics written by vocalist Eddie Vedder and music co-written by drummer Jack Irons and guitarist Stone Gossard, "Who You Are" was released on July 30, 1996, as the first single from the band's fourth studio album, No Code (1996). The song topped the US Billboard Modern Rock Tracks chart and the Canadian Alternative 30 chart. It also peaked at number 31 on the Billboard Hot 100, number two on the UK Rock Chart, and reached the top 10 in Australia, Canada, Norway, and Finland—where the song reached number two and became the band's highest-charting single.

The song was included on Pearl Jam's 2004 greatest hits album, Rearviewmirror (Greatest Hits 1991–2003). On Pearl Jam's greatest hits album, "Who You Are" has a slight lyric change—instead of "circumstance, clapping hands", the lyric is "avalanche, falling fast".

== Origin and recording ==
"Who You Are" features lyrics written by vocalist Eddie Vedder and music co-written by drummer Jack Irons and guitarist Stone Gossard. The polyrhythmic drum pattern for the song was inspired by a Max Roach drum solo that Irons heard at a drum shop when he was eight years old. Irons said, "To turn my drum music into a song is pretty challenging, but the guys have been really supportive of me doing it, and we've worked some things into a few songs." Vedder played an electric sitar on the song, giving it an Eastern-influenced sound. Regarding the song, Vedder said, "We realized that we had an opportunity to experiment."

== Release and reception ==
Vedder has admitted that the choice of "Who You Are" as the first single for No Code was a "conscious decision" intended to keep the size of the band's audience down. The single, containing the B-side "Habit" across most regions, was released in the United States on July 30, 1996. In the US, "Who You Are" peaked at number 31 on the Billboard Hot 100, number five on the Billboard Mainstream Rock Tracks chart, and number one on the Billboard Modern Rock Tracks chart. In Canada, the song reached number four on the RPM 100 chart and later appeared on the Alternative 30 chart, where it reached number one; it came in at number 17 on that chart's year-end issue.

Released in the United Kingdom on August 5, 1996, "Who You Are" reached the UK top 20, peaking at number 18 on the UK Singles Chart. Elsewhere, the single peaked at number five on the Australian Singles Chart, charted at number 26 in Sweden, and became a top-10 success in Norway and Finland; it is Pearl Jam's highest-charting single in the latter country, peaking at number two. The song was also a top-20 success in Ireland and New Zealand.

David Fricke of Rolling Stone said that the song has an "Indo-Bo Diddley glow" and called it a "buoyant electric variation on Vedder's recent collaborations with Pakistani vocal god Nusrat Fateh Ali Khan." Christopher John Farley of Time also identified an influence of Vedder's collaboration with Nusrat Fateh Ali Khan, stating, "The spiritualized, bass-heavy "Who You Are" is a solid number, but it clearly owes a lot to Pakistani singer Nusrat Fateh Ali Khan, with whom Pearl Jam frontman Eddie Vedder worked on the sound track to the film Dead Man Walking." Vedder denied that his collaboration with Nusrat Fateh Ali Khan had any influence on the song.

== Live performances ==
"Who You Are" was first performed live at the band's September 14, 1996, concert in Seattle, Washington at The Showbox. Following Irons' departure from the band in 1998 the song was dropped from set lists. After the band's March 9, 1998 concert in Sydney, Australia at the Sydney Entertainment Centre, the song was not performed live for a period of ten years. "Who You Are" finally made a return appearance at the band's June 11, 2008, concert in West Palm Beach, Florida at the Cruzan Amphitheatre. The song has since returned to Pearl Jam set lists, though its appearances are still relatively rare. Live performances of "Who You Are" can be found on various official bootlegs.

== Personnel ==
Personnel are taken from the No Code liner notes.

- Eddie Vedder – vocals, guitar
- Jeff Ament – bass guitar
- Stone Gossard – guitar, vocals
- Mike McCready – guitar
- Jack Irons – drums

== Charts ==
=== Weekly charts ===
Chart (1996)	Peak position
Australia (ARIA)	5
Canada Top Singles (RPM)	4
Canada Rock/Alternative (RPM)	1
Europe (Eurochart Hot 100)	48
Finland (Suomen virallinen lista)	2
Ireland (IRMA)	19
Netherlands (Dutch Top 40)	34
Netherlands (Single Top 100)	47
New Zealand (Recorded Music NZ)	17
Norway (VG-lista)	7
Scottish Singles Sales (Official Charts)	14
Spain Airplay (Music & Media)	7
Sweden (Sverigetopplistan)	26
UK Singles (Official Charts)	18
UK Rock & Metal (Official Charts)	2
US Billboard Hot 100	31
US Adult Alternative Airplay (Billboard)	18
US Alternative Airplay (Billboard)	1
US Mainstream Rock (Billboard)	5

=== Year-end charts ===
Chart (1996)	Position
Australia (ARIA)	84
Canada Top Singles (RPM)	47
Canada Rock/Alternative (RPM)	17
US Mainstream Rock Tracks (Billboard)	56
US Modern Rock Tracks (Billboard)	54

== Release history ==
Region	Date	Format(s)	Label(s)	Ref(s).
United States	July 30, 1996	Contemporary hit radio; CD; cassette	Epic	
United Kingdom	August 5, 1996	7-inch vinyl; CD; cassette	Epic	
Japan	August 28, 1996	CD	Sony	

== See also ==
- Number one modern rock hits of 1996
- List of RPM Rock/Alternative number-one singles
