= Single Video Theory =

Video by Pearl Jam
- Released: August 4, 1998
- Recorded: November 7–10, 1997, The Warehouse, Seattle
- Genre: Alternative rock
- Length: 45 minutes
- Language: English
- Label: Epic
- Director: Mark Pellington
- Producers: Tom Gorai, Bill Roare

Pearl Jam chronology
Single Video Theory (1998)	Touring Band 2000 (2001)

Professional ratings
Review scores
Source	Rating
AllMusic	3/5 stars

Single Video Theory is a music documentary directed by Mark Pellington that follows the making of Yield, the fifth album by the American alternative rock band Pearl Jam. It was released first on VHS on August 4, 1998, and then on DVD on November 24, 1998.

== Overview ==
The film was shot in 16mm film over three days in November 1997 in downtown Seattle. It features interviews with the band members and behind-the-scenes footage of the band's rehearsal sessions for its shows opening for The Rolling Stones. The term "single video theory" is a play on the "single-bullet theory", involving the assassination of John F. Kennedy.

The documentary illustrates how the band began to widen the songwriting responsibilities of its members, with bassist Jeff Ament credited with writing "Pilate" and "Low Light", and guitarist Mike McCready taking part in writing "Given to Fly" with vocalist Eddie Vedder. It was the first insight into the band's inner workings of its recording sessions, which had previously been shielded from the public. AllMusic gave it three out of a possible five stars. Allmusic staff writer Perry Seibert said, "The intimate musical performances will interest any fan of the band." Single Video Theory has been certified platinum by the RIAA.

== Track listing ==
1. "All Those Yesterdays"
2. "Faithfull"
3. "Brain of J."
4. "Given to Fly"
5. "No Way"
6. "MFC"
7. "Wishlist"
8. "In Hiding"
9. "Low Light"
10. "Do the Evolution"

== Personnel ==
Pearl Jam

- Jeff Ament – bass guitar
- Stone Gossard – guitar
- Jack Irons – drums
- Mike McCready – guitar
- Eddie Vedder – vocals, guitar

Production

- Cameron Crowe, Kelly Curtis – executive production
- Ellen Dux, Lisa Stewart – associate production
- Tom Gorai, Bill Roare – production
- Brendan O'Brien – song mixing
- Mark Pellington – direction
- Adam Schwartz – associate production, editing

== Chart positions ==
Chart (1998)	Position
US Top Music Videos	2
