= In Hiding =

Song by Pearl Jam

from the album Yield
- Released: February 3, 1998
- Recorded: February–June 1997; vocals recorded in September 1997
- Studio: Studio Litho, Seattle, Washington
- Genre: Alternative rock
- Length: 5:00
- Label: Epic
- Composer: Stone Gossard
- Lyricist: Eddie Vedder
- Producers: Brendan O'Brien, Pearl Jam

"In Hiding" is a song by the American rock band Pearl Jam. Featuring lyrics written by vocalist Eddie Vedder and music written by guitarist Stone Gossard, "In Hiding" is the eleventh track on the band's fifth studio album, Yield (1998). Despite the lack of a commercial single release, the song managed to reach number 13 on the Billboard Modern Rock Tracks chart and number 14 on their Mainstream Rock Tracks chart.

== Origin and recording ==
"In Hiding" features lyrics written by vocalist Eddie Vedder and music written by guitarist Stone Gossard. As shown on the DVD, Single Video Theory, Gossard brought the guitar riff for the song to the band after recording it on a microcassette recorder, while Vedder held off on writing lyrics for the song until late in the album's recording sessions. Drummer Jack Irons said, "I like "In Hiding" a lot...It's like a band track. It sounds like five guys just played a track together and I think that's pretty much what happened." Guitarist Mike McCready said, "Just something about it that strikes me. Even in the earlier demo stages when I heard it I knew it was something that had to happen."

== Lyrics ==
Vedder's lyrics for "In Hiding" were inspired by the writings of Charles Bukowski. The writer was known to stay in a room for days at a time without coming out. The lyric page for the song in the album's liner notes features a quote by Bukowski attributed to "Buk" in place of the lyrics for the song. Vedder on the origins of the song:

"In Hiding" is actually written about Bukowski. Sean Penn gave me a quote that Bukowski had said to him once, and it was written directly from that. He told Sean that sometimes he just has to check out for a few days—no people, no nothing. So he goes in hiding, then he gets back and has the will to live once again. Maybe because society takes you down. For all the good things we offer each other, sometimes we beat each other down.

When asked about the song in an interview, Vedder stated it was about "a life fast." Vedder about "In Hiding":

The song was about taking a fast from life, doing anything to get yourself back in touch with something real. Abstinence from anything is cool, because the normalcy of life is deceptive: It's enjoyable for a while, and there are good moments, but sometimes that's not enough. You start questioning what's the point. By not opening my mouth I was able to get into that state. Jack called me at the end of it; he couldn't understand what I was saying. It took a minute to get my speech back.

== Reception ==
Without being released as a single, "In Hiding" peaked at number 14 on the Billboard Mainstream Rock Tracks chart and number 13 on the Billboard Modern Rock Tracks chart in 1998. In Canada, "In Hiding" charted on the Alternative Top 30 chart where it peaked at number six and stayed there for two weeks.

"In Hiding" was featured in the Cold Case episode "The Long Blue Line" in 2009.

== Live performances ==
"In Hiding" was first performed live at the band's February 20, 1998 concert in Maui, Hawaii at the Alexander M. Baldwin Amphitheatre. Live performances of "In Hiding" can be found on various official bootlegs and the Live at the Gorge 05/06 box set. A performance of the song is also included on the DVD Single Video Theory. "In Hiding" is also featured on the 2011 official live release Live on Ten Legs.

== Chart positions ==
Chart (1998)	Position
US Modern Rock Tracks	13
US Mainstream Rock Tracks	14
Canadian RPM Alternative 30	6
