= Yield (album) =

Studio album by Pearl Jam
- Released: February 3, 1998
- Recorded: February–September 1997
- Studios: Studio Litho, Seattle, Washington; Studio X, Seattle, Washington; Doppler, Atlanta, Georgia; Southern Tracks, Atlanta, Georgia; Jack Irons' home
- Genres: Alternative rock; garage rock
- Length: 48:37
- Label: Epic
- Producers: Brendan O'Brien, Pearl Jam

Pearl Jam chronology
No Code (1996)	Yield (1998)	Binaural (2000)

Singles from Yield
- 1. "Given to Fly" Released: December 22, 1997; 2. "Wishlist" Released: May 5, 1998

Yield is the fifth studio album by American rock band Pearl Jam, released on February 3, 1998. Following a short promotional tour for its previous album, No Code (1996), Pearl Jam recorded Yield throughout 1997 at Studio Litho and Studio X in Seattle, Washington. The album was hailed as a return to the band's early, straightforward rock sound, and marked a more collaborative effort, as opposed to relying on frontman Eddie Vedder to compose the song lyrics as on the first four studio albums.

Yield received positive reviews and debuted at number two on the Billboard 200. While like No Code, the album soon began falling in the charts, Yield eventually outsold its predecessor. The band did more promotion for the album compared to No Code, including a return to full-scale touring and the release of a music video for the song "Do the Evolution". The record has been certified platinum by the RIAA in the United States. The album is Pearl Jam's last release with drummer Jack Irons, who left the band during the album's promotional tour. He was replaced by Soundgarden drummer Matt Cameron.

== Recording ==
For its fifth album, Pearl Jam again worked with producer Brendan O'Brien, whom the band had worked with on its previous three records. Yield was recorded throughout 1997 in Seattle, Washington at Studio X and Studio Litho, the latter of which is owned by guitarist Stone Gossard. They weren't able to record it entirely at Studio Litho since it was booked by Deftones, who recorded their album Around the Fur at the studio between April and June 1997. The album was then mixed by O'Brien at his mixing facility at Southern Tracks in Atlanta, Georgia. The album would be the last collaboration with O'Brien for several years, until he was brought on board in 2008 to remix the band's debut album Ten and produce 2009's Backspacer.

Compared with Vitalogy and No Code, Yield represented more of a team effort among all members of the group. Lead vocalist Eddie Vedder had made the final decisions for Vitalogy and No Code; however, at the end of the No Code recording sessions, Vedder suggested to bassist Jeff Ament that it would be better for the other members to write and bring in more complete songs so Vedder would be under less pressure to finish the songs. Ament said that "everybody took that to heart", and O'Brien added that most of the songs came to the studio finished. Ament also said that Vedder's reaction to the rest of the band's new material kept "everybody energized about their place in the band". Vedder worked with the other band members on their own material before work was started on his. Guitarist Mike McCready noticed a change in Vedder's attitude during the recording of Yield, stating, "I used to be afraid of him and not want to confront him on things ... We talk more now, and hang out ... He seems very, very centered now."

Vedder said that the band was able to "team up" and have a "partnership" while the album was being recorded. The band spent a large amount of time rehearsing the songs to get the best takes possible. Gossard commented that there was more "contouring" and "honing" of demo material than on previous records. Regarding the recording sessions, drummer Jack Irons said, "We didn't put any time limit on it. It was like, 'When this record's done, we call it a record.' We took out time to come up with ideal sounds and feel for every song, so that each had its own identity. We would cut a track and go back and listen to it and openly discuss it." Ament stated that "Yield was a superfun record to make. And so much of it was Ed kind of sitting back." He added that "everybody really got a little bit of their say on the record...because of that, everybody feels like they're an integral part of the band." The band discussed the album's production on the documentary Single Video Theory.

In a June 1997 interview, Vedder said the band had "just about finished" recording the album. However, Gossard would spend the next period of time focusing on his side project Brad, who had just released their second Epic Records album Interiors late that same month. No work on Yield occurred during July 1997, with the band commencing recording in August. In October 1997, it was confirmed that the album was completed, with a rumored Christmas release date.

=== Outtakes ===
The album's singles featured two B-sides from the Yield recording sessions that were not included on the album: "Leatherman", about the eponymous 19th century vagabond was a B-side on the "Given to Fly" single, and "U" was featured on the "Wishlist" single, being later re-recorded for the 2003 Lost Dogs collection of rarities. "Whale Song", sung by Irons, was also recorded during the Yield sessions and was eventually included on the 1999 Music for Our Mother Ocean, Vol. 3 compilation as well as Lost Dogs. "Happy When I'm Crying" was recorded around this time and was released on the band's 1997 fan club Christmas single.

== Music and lyrics ==
"Given to Fly"
A sample of "Given to Fly", the first single released from the album. The song features Vedder's distinctive baritone vocals and McCready's prominent lead guitar throughout.

"Wishlist"
A sample of "Wishlist", the second single released from the album. The lyrics for the song, written by Vedder, are about seeking fulfillment of wishes desired.

Overall, Yield resembles the straightforward rock approach of the band's early work. Gossard said "The songs were a little bit more structured. I don't know if it was poppier, but it seemed more professional." O'Brien noted that during the Yield sessions, the band made a conscious effort to create more accessible songs. Tom Sinclair of Entertainment Weekly stated that the band has "turned in an intermittently affecting album that veers between fiery garage rock and rootsy, acoustic-based ruminations. Perhaps mindful of their position as the last alt-rock ambassadors with any degree of clout, they've come up with their most cohesive album since their 1991 debut, Ten." Sinclair went on to say "Given to Fly", the album's first single, was similar to Led Zeppelin's "Going to California" from the 1971 album, Led Zeppelin IV.

Lyrically, Yield continued with the more contemplative type of writing found on No Code. Vedder said that while "in the past we got really angry and we cried out against many things in our songs," he considered that when "you become an adult you have to express your energy in a different way, more calm." This led to songs that, while not eschewing "the bad side of life", ended up "facing it from a more positive point of view, looking for a way to solve it. In the past we said: what a shit, this stinks, that sucks, everything sucks... Now it's time to say: stop, let's look for a solution, let's be positive." Several songs on the album were inspired by literary works, including Mikhail Bulgakov's novel The Master and Margarita ("Pilate"), Daniel Quinn's novel Ishmael ("Do the Evolution"), and the writings of Charles Bukowski ("In Hiding"). Gossard wrote the lyrics for the songs "No Way" and "All Those Yesterdays", and Ament, making his first lyrical contributions to a Pearl Jam album, wrote the lyrics for "Pilate" and "Low Light". Ament said, "[to] watch Eddie put his heart into singing lyrics that I wrote was an experience I can't put into words."

Gossard said "No Way" expresses the idea that people just need to live "and quit trying to prove something". According to Vedder, "Given to Fly" is about "rising above anybody's comments about what you do and still giving your love away", "Do the Evolution" is about "someone who's drunk with technology, who thinks they're the controlling living being on this planet", "MFC" takes place in a car and is about "getting the fuck out of a problem", and "In Hiding" is about "taking a fast from life". Ament said that "Pilate" concerned a question he was asking himself, dealing with a recurring dream Ament had with being old sitting with his dog on the porch, while "Low Light" was the answer, and that it deals with "a kind of gratefulness at finding that place of calm and peace at my center and getting a glimpse of the person I could choose to be." According to the San Francisco Chronicle, only two tracks show the band seeking "art-house credibility", namely "🔴", which features manipulated steel drums and falsetto vocals, and the hidden track at the end of the album, described as "a playful electric-guitar version of belly-dancing music."

== Packaging and title ==
The album's cover art shows an empty road underneath a bright blue sky with a yield sign on the right-hand side of the road. The front cover art image was taken from a photograph of Montana Highway 200 between Lincoln and Great Falls, Montana, while the inside cover depicts the yield sign in the middle of the ocean. The cover of the cassette version mirrored the image. A yield sign is hidden in every picture of the liner notes booklet. At the 1999 Grammy Awards, Yield received a nomination for Best Recording Package. Ament said that the cover came from the idea on "how cool to have a yield sign where there's nothing to yield to", and the place was a road on the way to his Montana home which he considered perfect for the photo.

The album title is rooted in the idea of "yielding to nature", a theme central to Daniel Quinn's novel Ishmael. The band members read the book while working on the album. Regarding the title, McCready said, "I think the title Yield has to do with maybe being more comfortable within ourselves, with this band....we're all a little bit older and a little more relaxed and maybe just kind of yielding to those anxieties and not trying to fight it so much...That's what it kind of feels to me – yielding, letting something else happen and going with it." Vedder said, "Let's say that hypothetically speaking, the title does mean something...You can fight so much, and then you have to think, 'What are the real battles?' 'What's really important?' You get to a certain point, and it's really hard to remember what music is and to remember what drives you."

== Release and reception ==
=== Commercial performance ===
Yield was released on February 3, 1998, on CD, vinyl, cassette and MiniDisc. Epic promoted the album more than No Code, with marketing vice-president Steve Barnett claiming it was the first time since debut album Ten that the label "had the lead time to do the job right". The album leaked on the internet in December 1997 as Syracuse, New York radio station WKRL-FM played an advance copy of the record, leading fans who taped the broadcast to release the tracks online. Two singles were released from Yield. The lead single "Given to Fly" entered the Billboard Hot 100 at number 21, reached number three on the Modern Rock charts, and spent a total of six weeks at number one on the Mainstream Rock charts. The album's other commercially released single, "Wishlist", charted on the Hot 100 at number 47. Album tracks "In Hiding" and "Do the Evolution" also charted on the rock charts. The band hired comic book artist Todd McFarlane to create an animated video for "Do the Evolution". It was the band's first music video since 1992. At the 1999 Grammy Awards, "Do the Evolution" received a nomination for Best Hard Rock Performance and its music video received a nomination for Best Music Video, Short Form.

Yield sold 358,000 copies during its first week of release, and debuted at number two on the Billboard 200 album chart. It was held off the top spot by the Titanic soundtrack. Yield became Pearl Jam's first album not to peak at number one on the Billboard charts since Ten in 1991. However, Yield has been certified platinum by the RIAA, and eventually outsold its predecessor No Code with 1.9 million copies in the United States as of 2008 according to Nielsen SoundScan.

=== Critical reception ===
Professional ratings
Review scores
Source	Rating
AllMusic	2.5/5 stars
Entertainment Weekly	B
The Guardian	4/5 stars
Los Angeles Times	4/4 stars
NME	7/10
Pitchfork	8.5/10
Rolling Stone	4/5 stars
Spin	8/10
USA Today	3.5/4 stars
The Village Voice	A−

Yield received generally favourable reviews from music critics. Rolling Stone staff writer Rob Sheffield wrote that while "before, the band's best songs were the change-of-pace ballads", Yield "marks the first time Pearl Jam have managed to sustain that mood for a whole album." He added that "Vedder is singing more frankly than ever about his life as an adult," and that the album "shows that Pearl Jam have made the most out of growing up in public." Spin's RJ Smith said that Pearl Jam had "come back with an album full of gracefully ambivalent anthems. All commodities should be this unstable, and have this much blood pumping through them." In his review for The Village Voice, critic Robert Christgau said, "Like nobody less than Nirvana... they voice the arena-rock agon more vulnerably and articulately than any Englishman standing. Rarely if ever has a Jesus complex seemed so modest." Jon Pareles of The New York Times stated that the band "applies its introspection to spiritual possibilities and its guitars to chomping, snarling, exuberant riffs." He said "the songs sound bolder and more confident, even when they invoke private crises." Tom Sinclair of Entertainment Weekly said that "the overall tone is less pretentious than in the past, reflecting a looser, even marginally whimsical, worldview." Edna Gundersen of USA Today found that the album reasserts Pearl Jam as "the only grunge force to outlive that genre, expand musical boundaries and still embody the original spirit of rock 'n' roll". NME's Simon Williams praised its musical diversity, remarking that the band "stomp across their bluesy roots, careering through various styles and pop-mongous strops."

However, AllMusic staff writer Stephen Thomas Erlewine was more critical, finding that the division of Yield "into rock and ballad sides" only "emphasizes the relative lack of exceptional material". Writing for Select in March 1998, Eddy Lawrence concluded that Yield is an abandonment of the "anthemic qualities" present in Pearl Jam's previous work, claiming, in relation to the band's grunge roots, that the album "makes you realise how '60s fans felt watching the first generation of rock heroes die". He went on to state that "Yield's retroisms represent no leap forward for the band as a whole, and the oft-times mildly diverting tunes are, ironically, less challenging than their strong-willed early output."

== Tour ==
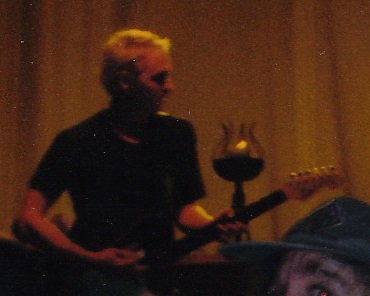
Mike McCready on stage with Pearl Jam in Columbia, Maryland on September 18, 1998.

Pearl Jam promoted the album with tours in Oceania and North America in 1998. Both were met with financial success, and the Australian shows in Melbourne sold out in just 17 minutes. After finishing the Australian concerts, Irons left the band due to dissatisfaction with touring. Pearl Jam's sound engineer Brett Eliason stated, "We went and did Hawaii and Australia with Jack. When we came back, Jack wasn't in a position to carry on. He made that decision more or less by himself. He can be a really great drummer but he had difficulty on tour putting out the energy for the length of shows they were doing. I don't know if he thought they'd put things on hold for him." He was replaced on an initially temporary basis with former Soundgarden drummer Matt Cameron. Cameron said, "I got a phone call out of the blue, from Mr. Ed Ved, Stoney and Kelly. I was ambushed. It was really short notice. He called and said 'hey what are you doing this summer?'" Cameron learned over 80 songs in two weeks. Regarding his entrance, Cameron stated that "The guys made me feel real welcome and it wasn't a struggle to get it musically, but my style was a little bit different, I think, than what they were used to. And they've been through so many different drummers, I don't even know if they knew what they wanted. So, I just kind of played the way I played and then eventually we kind of figured out what worked best for the band."

Pearl Jam's summer tour of North America marked the band's return to full-scale touring and the use of Ticketmaster, to which the band had previously protested. Pearl Jam once again began using it in order to "better accommodate concertgoers". The band still kept Ticketmaster venues at a minimum, stadiums in particular as manager Kelly Curtis joked that unlike U2, "the band doesn't have a lemon". The first leg of the tour focused on the West Coast of the United States and the Midwest, and then the band moved to the East Coast for the tour's second leg. and after it was completed the band released its first live album, Live on Two Legs, which featured select performances from the tour. McCready stated that the band released the live album due to the strength of Pearl Jam's shows on the tour.

On October 20, 2014, at the BMO Harris Bradley Center in Milwaukee, during the Lightning Bolt Tour, Pearl Jam played the entire album in order as part of their set.

== Track listing ==
All lyrics are written by Eddie Vedder, except where noted.

Yield track listing
No.	Title	Lyrics	Music	Length
1.	"Brain of J."		Mike McCready	2:59
2.	"Faithfull"		McCready	4:18
3.	"No Way"	Stone Gossard	Gossard	4:19
4.	"Given to Fly"		McCready	4:01
5.	"Wishlist"		Vedder	3:26
6.	"Pilate"	Jeff Ament	Ament	3:00
7.	"Do the Evolution"		Gossard	3:54
8.	"🔴"	Jack Irons	Irons	1:06
9.	"MFC"		Vedder	2:27
10.	"Low Light"	Ament	Ament	3:46
11.	"In Hiding"		Gossard	5:00
12.	"Push Me, Pull Me"		Ament	2:28
13.	"All Those Yesterdays"	Gossard	Gossard	7:47
Total length:				48:37

Notes:

- "🔴" is also known as "The Color Red", "Red Bar", "Red Dot", or "Untitled".
- "All Those Yesterdays" includes the hidden track "Hummus" (written by Gossard) starting at 5:04.

== Personnel ==
Pearl Jam

- Eddie Vedder – vocals, guitar
- Jeff Ament – bass (except "No Way" and "Do the Evolution"); photography, layout
- Stone Gossard – guitar, bass on "No Way" and "Do the Evolution"; credited as "Carpenter Newton" for album concept
- Mike McCready – guitar
- Jack Irons – drums; vocals on track 8

=== Production ===
- Brendan O'Brien – production; mixing (except on "Push Me, Pull Me")
- Pearl Jam – production
- Nick DiDia – mixing on "Push Me, Pull Me", recording
- Matt Bayles – additional engineering, second engineer (at Studio Litho)
- Sam Hofstedt – second engineer (at Studio X)
- Ryan Williams – second engineer (at Southern Tracks)
- Rodney Mills' Masterhouse – mastering
- Barry Ament, George Estrada, Coby Schultz – layout
- Jerry Gay, Greg Montijo – photography
- P. – Jeff Ament glacier photo

== Charts ==
=== Weekly charts ===
Weekly chart performance for Yield
Chart (1998)	Peak position
Australian Albums (ARIA)	1
Austrian Albums (Ö3 Austria)	4
Belgian Albums (Ultratop Flanders)	3
Belgian Albums (Ultratop Wallonia)	34
Canada Top Albums/CDs (RPM)	2
Danish Albums (Hitlisten)	9
Dutch Albums (Album Top 100)	4
Finnish Albums (Suomen virallinen lista)	4
French Albums (SNEP)	6
German Albums (Offizielle Top 100)	4
Hungarian Albums (MAHASZ)	8
Irish Albums (IRMA)	4
Italian Albums (FIMI)	2
Japanese Albums (Oricon)	2
New Zealand Albums (RMNZ)	1
Norwegian Albums (VG-lista)	1
Portuguese Albums (AFP)	2
Scottish Albums (Official Charts)	7
Spanish Albums (Promusicae)	4
Swedish Albums (Sverigetopplistan)	3
Swiss Albums (Schweizer Hitparade)	6
UK Albums (Official Charts)	7
UK Rock & Metal Albums (Official Charts)	1
US Billboard 200	2

=== Year-end charts ===
Year-end chart performance for Yield
Chart (1998)	Position
Australian Albums (ARIA)	28
Belgian Albums (Ultratop Flanders)	61
Dutch Albums (Album Top 100)	78
German Albums (Offizielle Top 100)	69
New Zealand Albums (RMNZ)	44
US Billboard 200	53

== Certifications ==
Certifications for Yield
Region	Certification	Certified units/sales
Australia (ARIA)	Platinum	70,000^{^}
Canada (Music Canada)	2× Platinum	200,000^{^}
Netherlands (NVPI)	Gold	50,000^{^}
New Zealand (RMNZ)	Platinum	15,000^{^}
Poland (ZPAV)	Gold	50,000^{*}
Spain (Promusicae)	Gold	50,000^{^}
United Kingdom (BPI)	Gold	100,000^{*}
United States (RIAA)	Platinum	1,000,000^{^}
^{*} Sales figures based on certification alone.^{^} Shipments figures based on certification alone.

== See also ==
- Give Way, a 2023 live album of a recording from the Yield Tour
