= Low Light (Pearl Jam song) =

Song by Pearl Jam

from the album Yield
- Length: 3:46
- Label: Epic
- Songwriter: Jeff Ament
- Producers: Brendan O'Brien; Pearl Jam

"Low Light" is a song by American rock band Pearl Jam. It was released as the tenth track on the band's fifth studio album Yield (1998). It was written by bassist Jeff Ament, one of his first two solo writing credits on a Pearl Jam album.

== Background ==
During the creation of the Yield album, lead singer Eddie Vedder advocated for more group involvement in the writing process, encouraging the other members of Pearl Jam to share ideas to a greater extent than with past albums. "Low Light", alongside fellow Yield track "Pilate", were written by Ament as part of a group of "a half dozen songs written with the motivation from 'Ed saying he wanted help and more complete ideas.'" Vedder remarked positively on the experience of first playing the song with Ament and drummer Jack Irons, stating: "I just sang it over the guitar and the drums, and I got chills. Part of it was knowing that Jeff wrote it. And it just sounded really good; I really enjoyed what he had written."

Dave Marsh opined that in comparison to the "eccentric" sound of much of Yield, "Low Light" is more similar to "the classic Pearl Jam" of the band's first two albums. Ament has suggested that its lyrics connect to those of "Pilate", with that song asking questions answered within "Low Light". AllMusic's Stephen Thomas Erlewine characterizes the track as a "folk-tinged, meditative number" while Greg M. Schwartz of PopMatters describes it as a ballad highlighted by "acoustic guitars evoking vast skies in the middle of nowhere".
