= No Code =

- One of four alternative covers to the album—all feature similar montages of Polaroid photos.

Studio album by Pearl Jam
- Released: August 27, 1996
- Recorded: July 12, 1995 – May 1996
- Studios: CRC (Chicago); Kingsway (New Orleans); Litho (Seattle)
- Genres: Art rock; garage punk
- Length: 49:30
- Label: Epic
- Producers: Brendan O'Brien, Pearl Jam

Pearl Jam chronology
Vitalogy (1994)	No Code (1996)	Yield (1998)

Singles from No Code
- 1. "Who You Are" Released: July 30, 1996; 2. "Hail, Hail" Released: October 21, 1996; 3. "Off He Goes" Released: January 11, 1997

No Code is the fourth studio album by American rock band Pearl Jam, released on August 27, 1996, through Epic Records. Following a troubled tour for its previous album, Vitalogy (1994), in which Pearl Jam engaged in a much-publicized boycott of Ticketmaster, the band went into the studio to record its follow-up. The music on the record was more diverse than what the band had recorded on previous releases, incorporating elements of garage rock and worldbeat.

Although No Code debuted at number one on the Billboard 200, making it Pearl Jam's third consecutive number one album, it left a large section of the band's fanbase unsatisfied and quickly fell down the charts. Critical reviews were also mixed, with praise to the musical variety but criticism to the album's inconsistency. The album became the first Pearl Jam album to not reach multi-platinum status, receiving a single platinum certification by the Recording Industry Association of America (RIAA) in the United States.

== Recording ==
For its fourth album, Pearl Jam again worked with producer Brendan O'Brien, with whom the band had worked on predecessors Vs. (1993) and Vitalogy (1994). No Code was the band's first album with drummer Jack Irons, who'd joined the band as Vitalogy was being completed. Following the summer U.S. leg of the band's Vitalogy Tour, the band began work on No Code at the Chicago Recording Company studios in Chicago for a week in July 1995 during the infamous Chicago heat wave. During a break in a string of make-up dates for the 1995 tour the band went into the studio for a week-long session in New Orleans, Louisiana, where the band recorded "Off He Goes". The rest of the recording took place in the first half of 1996 in Seattle at Studio Litho, owned by guitarist Stone Gossard. The album was then mixed by O'Brien at his mixing facility at Southern Tracks in Atlanta.

The sessions for the album began with strife and tension. Bassist Jeff Ament was not made aware the band was recording until three days into the sessions, and said that he "wasn't super involved with that record on any level." Guitarist Mike McCready said, "I'm sure Jeff was pissed, but it was more about separating, because if we played all together nothing would get done. We'd all just get pissed off at each other." At one point Ament even walked out of the recording sessions, and considered quitting the band due to lead vocalist Eddie Vedder's control of the creation process. Due to Pearl Jam balancing recording and touring, Irons commented that the band was "more on-the-fly during the making of No Code, and some good things happened out of that, but we were also really tired. It was difficult to tour and play these shows that were two or three hours long and then force ourselves to produce something in a studio."

McCready said that a lot of the songs were developed out of jam sessions, and said "I think we kind of rushed it a little bit." Ament said that the band members would bring in fragments of songs, and it would take hours before Vedder could have music to which he could add vocals. He added that "Ed's typically the guy who finishes off the songs...But by the end of No Code, he was so burnt, it was so much work for him." The band's mood had gotten better by the time the album was finished, and the bandmembers gave credit for this to Irons. Regarding Irons, O'Brien stated that "everybody was on their best musical behavior around him." McCready said that Irons urged the band members to discuss their problems, and called him "a big spiritual influence, if not the biggest." Vedder said, "Making No Code was all about gaining perspective." Commenting upon the sessions as a whole, O'Brien said, "It was really a transitional record. We had a good time making it."

=== Outtakes ===
Two outtakes from the recording sessions ended up as B-sides, "Black, Red, Yellow" on the "Hail, Hail" single, and "Dead Man," originally intended for the film Dead Man Walking, on "Off He Goes." Both songs were included on the 2003 Lost Dogs collection of rarities, along with four other tracks from the No Code sessions, two of which ended up on compilations – "Leaving Here," which appeared on Home Alive, and "Gremmie Out of Control," featured on Music for Our Mother Ocean Vol. 1. The other rejected songs were "All Night" and "Don't Gimme No Lip." "Olympic Platinum," written by the album's mixer Nick DiDia around the time of the 1996 Summer Olympics, was recorded by the band and released on its 1996 fan club Christmas single.

== Music and lyrics ==
"Who You Are"
A sample of "Who You Are", the first single released from the album. The song has an Eastern-influenced guitar sound and a polyrhythmic drum pattern created by Irons.

"Hail, Hail"
A sample of "Hail, Hail", the second single released from the album. The song is heavily influenced by garage rock.

While Vitalogy had shifted away from the earlier albums' accessible compositions and polished production, No Code represented a deliberate break from Ten's stadium sound, favoring experimental ballads and noisy garage rock songs. It stood out with its emphasis on subtle harmony ("Off He Goes"), Eastern influences ("Who You Are"), and spoken word ("I'm Open"). Irons lends a tribal drum sound on the songs "Who You Are" and "In My Tree". Irons stated, "To turn my drum music into a song is pretty challenging, but the guys have been really supportive of me doing it, and we've worked some things into a few songs." Vedder said, "We realized that we had an opportunity to experiment." David Browne of Entertainment Weekly stated that "No Code displays a wider range of moods and instrumentation than on any previous Pearl Jam album."

The lyrical themes on the album deal with issues of spirituality, morality, and self-examination. Vedder said, "I think there's a little self-examination in those songs, something that a lot of my friends are going through too, as they approach 30." Ament said, "In some ways, it's like the band's story. It's about growing up." The lyrics of "Hail, Hail" refer to two people in a troubled relationship struggling to hold it together. Vedder has said that he wrote the song "Off He Goes" about himself and how he is a "shit friend," adding, "I'll show up and everything's great and then all of a sudden I'm out of there..." "Lukin" is about the "pretty intense stalker problem" Vedder faced during the mid-1990s. "Around the Bend" was written by Vedder as a lullaby that Irons could sing to his son.

The lyrics to "Smile" are taken from a note that Dennis Flemion of The Frogs hid inside Vedder's notebook while he was onstage performing. The words used in the note are taken from the Frogs songs "This Is How I Feel" and "Now I Wanna Be Dead". Flemion is given credit in the vinyl, but the credit is absent from the CD version. The lyrics to "Red Mosquito" were inspired by the events surrounding Pearl Jam's June 24, 1995, concert at San Francisco's Golden Gate Park, which happened on the same day Vedder was hospitalized due to food poisoning. Vedder only made it through seven songs and the band was forced to cancel the remaining dates of the short tour that it was on. For the first time on a Pearl Jam album, a band member other than Vedder contributed lyrics, with Gossard writing the lyrics to "Mankind." Gossard also sang lead vocals on the track.

== Packaging and title ==
The album cover unfolded, creating the No Code logo

The album package consists of 156 Polaroid photos that unfold into a 2×2 square. The Polaroid photos are seemingly random. One of the photos featured on the front cover is the eyeball of Dennis Rodman, former Chicago Bulls player and friend of the band, while another photo is of Vedder's foot after he had been stung by a stingray. The pictures, when viewed from afar, blend to form the No Code triangle/eyeball logo that is the theme throughout the album. Later pressings of the CD featured a 1x4 format packaging, losing the hidden message effect. The CD and vinyl came with lyrics printed on the back of replica Polaroids. Only nine Polaroids came in a set, (with a catalog number Suffix of 'C' 'O' 'D' or 'E')leaving one to have to obtain another set to accumulate all thirteen songs.

When discussing the album's title, Vedder said "it's called No Code because it's full of code. It's misinformation." In medical terminology, a "no code" order is a medical order to withhold CPR on a patient. It is also known as a "do not resuscitate" order. In another interview, Vedder said that "if the record is a complete failure you've kind of owned up to it in a subliminal way. No Code was the same thing. For me, No Code meant 'Do Not Resuscitate'."

== Tour ==
Pearl Jam promoted the album with tours in North America and Europe in the fall of 1996. The short tour of North America focused on the East Coast of the United States. As with Vitalogy, very little touring was done in the United States to promote No Code because of the band's refusal to play in Ticketmaster's venues. The band chose to use alternate ticketing companies for the shows. A European tour followed in the fall of 1996, of which the band's November 3, 1996, show in Berlin, Germany at Deutschlandhalle was broadcast on many radio stations worldwide.

During the North American tour fans complained about the difficulty in obtaining tickets and the use of non-Ticketmaster venues, which were judged to be remote and impersonal. Gossard stated that there was "a lot of stress associated with trying to tour at that time" and that "it was growing more and more difficult to be excited about being part of the band." He added, "Ticketmaster, as monopolistic as it may be, is very efficient so we weren't playing the venues we wanted to play."

On October 17, 2014, at the iWireless Center in Moline, Illinois, during the Lightning Bolt Tour, Pearl Jam played the entire album in order as part of their set.

== Release and reception ==
=== Commercial performance ===
No Code sold 366,500 copies in its first week of release, topping the Billboard 200, but falling short of analysts' predictions of at least 535,000 copies. This was significantly less than what the band's previous two albums sold in their respective first weeks of release. It was, however, the seventh biggest-selling debut of what was a slow year for the industry. It stayed at number one for two weeks, and was Pearl Jam's last album to debut at number one on the album chart until Backspacer was released in 2009. By its sixth week, the album had sold 790,000 copies. No Code was certified platinum by the RIAA, but was the band's first album to not reach multi-platinum status. As of 2013, the album has sold 1.3 million copies in the United States according to Nielsen SoundScan.

Three singles were released from No Code. The lead single "Who You Are" peaked at number 31 on the Billboard Hot 100, and reached number one on the Modern Rock charts and number five on the Mainstream Rock charts. Neither of the album's other singles, "Hail, Hail" and "Off He Goes", charted on the Hot 100, but both placed on the Mainstream Rock and Modern Rock charts, as did album track "Red Mosquito".

"Present Tense" reached No. 1 on iTunes' Top 40 US Rock Songs chart on May 18, 2020, after being featured in the ending of the ESPN documentary series The Last Dance.

=== Critical response ===
Professional ratings
Review scores
Source	Rating
AllMusic	3.5/5 stars
Entertainment Weekly	C
The Guardian	3/5 stars
Los Angeles Times	4/4 stars
NME	7/10
Pitchfork	5.4/10
Q	4/5 stars
Rolling Stone	4/5 stars
Spin	6/10
USA Today	3/4 stars

Upon its release, No Code received a mixed to positive critical reception. Rolling Stone staff writer David Fricke gave No Code four out of five stars, saying that the album "is abrupt in its mood swings almost to the point of vertigo." He praised the album as "the kind of impulsive, quixotic, provocative ruckus that has become rare in a modern-rock mainstream" and added that "No Code basically means no rule books, no limits and, above all, no fear." Q gave the album four out of five stars. The review said that the album "constantly adds unexpected and fascinating details....A solid attraction amid intriguing oddities is the powerful array of guitar sounds." Critic Robert Christgau described the album as "slowly winning a heartwarming battle against constitutional melancholia." AllMusic staff writer Stephen Thomas Erlewine gave the album three and a half out of five stars, saying, "While a bit too incoherent, No Code is Pearl Jam's richest and most rewarding album to date as well as their most human." NME gave No Code a seven out of ten. In the review, it is stated that "Vedder is still preoccupied with his own mortality, but now he appears more quasi-mystical than miserable....for all its relative placidity, No Code is still a difficult beast."

Referring to the songs on the album, Jon Pareles of The New York Times said "about half are worth the effort." He observed that "too often, [Vedder] falls into American culture's Disney syndrome, idealizing childhood innocence above all." David Browne of Entertainment Weekly gave the album a C, saying that while No Code "cracks open their sound", it "becomes a collection of fragments that don't add up to much of anything, except a portrait of a musically disjointed band." On the change in mood compared with the band's previous releases, he said that "the album leaves you with the vaguely unsettling feeling that Pearl Jam without pain are like a pretzel without salt, or Seattle without rain." Ryan Schreiber of Pitchfork stated that "there's a ton of filler here. In fact, it's almost all filler." Time reviewer Christopher John Farley said that the album "makes it sound as if they're having a midlife crisis." Farley added that "too few of the songs on the Pearl Jam CD explore the musical possibilities they suggest in any kind of definitive or provocative manner."

== Track listing ==
All lyrics are written by Eddie Vedder, except "Mankind" by Stone Gossard.

No Code track listing
No.	Title	Music	Length
1.	"Sometimes"	Vedder	2:40
2.	"Hail, Hail"	Gossard, Jeff Ament, Mike McCready	3:41
3.	"Who You Are"	Gossard, Jack Irons	3:50
4.	"In My Tree"	Gossard, Irons, Vedder	3:59
5.	"Smile"	Ament	3:52
6.	"Off He Goes"	Vedder	6:02
7.	"Habit"	Vedder	3:35
8.	"Red Mosquito"	Ament, Gossard, Irons, McCready, Vedder	4:03
9.	"Lukin"	Vedder	1:02
10.	"Present Tense"	McCready	5:46
11.	"Mankind"	Gossard	3:28
12.	"I'm Open"	Irons, Vedder	2:57
13.	"Around the Bend"	Vedder	4:35
Total length:			49:30

== Personnel ==
Pearl Jam

- Eddie Vedder – vocals, guitar, harmonica on "Smile", Polaroids; credited as "Jerome Turner" for layout, concept of No Code
- Jeff Ament – bass guitar, guitar on "Smile", Polaroids, black-and-white photography
- Stone Gossard – guitar, vocals, lead vocals on "Mankind"
- Mike McCready – guitar, piano on "Sometimes", Polaroids
- Jack Irons – drums

Production

- Barry Ament, Chris McGann – Polaroids, layout
- Matt Bayles, Caram Costanzo, Jeff Lane – assistant engineering
- Dr. Paul J. Bubak, A. Fields – Polaroids
- Nick DiDia – mixing, recording
- Bob Ludwig – mastering
- Lance Mercer – Polaroids, black-and-white photography
- Brendan O'Brien – production, mixing, piano on "Smile", "Off He Goes" and "Around the Bend"
- Pearl Jam – production

== Chart performance ==
=== Weekly charts ===
Weekly chart performance for No Code
Chart (1996)	Peak position
Australian Albums (ARIA)	1
Austrian Albums (Ö3 Austria)	3
Belgian Albums (Ultratop Flanders)	6
Belgian Albums (Ultratop Wallonia)	5
Canadian Albums (RPM)	1
Danish Albums (Hitlisten)	1
Dutch Albums (Album Top 100)	5
European Albums (Billboard)	3
Finnish Albums (Suomen virallinen lista)	4
French Albums (SNEP)	28
German Albums (Offizielle Top 100)	6
Hungarian Albums (MAHASZ)	17
Irish Albums (IRMA)	3
Italian Albums (FIMI)	4
Japanese Albums (Oricon)	16
New Zealand (RMNZ)	1
Norwegian Albums (VG-lista)	3
Portuguese Albums (AFP)	1
Scottish Albums (Official Charts)	7
Spanish Albums (AFYVE)	11
Swedish Albums (Sverigetopplistan)	1
Swiss Albums (Schweizer Hitparade)	13
UK Albums (OCC)	3
UK Rock & Metal Albums (Official Charts)	1
US Billboard 200	1

=== Year-end charts ===
1996 year-end chart performance for No Code
Chart (1996)	Rank
Australian Albums (ARIA)	26
Canada Top Albums/CDs (RPM)	21
Dutch Albums (Album Top 100)	91
European Albums (European Top 100 Albums)	62
German Albums (Offizielle Top 100)	96
New Zealand Albums (RMNZ)	22
Swedish Albums & Compilations (Sverigetopplistan)	91
US Billboard 200	57

== Certifications ==
Certifications and sales for No Code
Region	Certification	Certified units/sales
Australia (ARIA)	2× Platinum	140,000^{^}
Canada (Music Canada)	2× Platinum	200,000^{^}
New Zealand (RMNZ)	Platinum	15,000^{^}
United Kingdom (BPI)	Gold	100,000^{*}
United States (RIAA)	Platinum	1,300,000
^{*} Sales figures based on certification alone.^{^} Shipments figures based on certification alone.
