= The Buck Pets =

American alternative rock band

- The Buck Pets (ca. 1989)

Background information
- Origin: Dallas, Texas, United States
- Genres: Alternative rock, hardcore punk
- Years active: 1986–1993, 2010
- Labels: Island, Restless
- Past members: Andy Thompson; Chris Savage; Ian Beach; Tony Alba; Chuck Smith; Ricky Pearson

The Buck Pets were an American melodic arena-garage rock band formed in the late 1980s in Dallas, Texas.

Initially they were promoted and well supported by Island, releasing The Buck Pets, and the slightly more melodic follow up Mercurotones. But on the eve of the release of Mercurotones, Island was acquired by PolyGram- the A&R staff were let go and projects were shelved while the new owners evaluated their new property and the Pets were sadly overlooked in the process.

They had a brief opening spots on tour with Neil Young for the Ragged Glory Tour - with Social Distortion (and were regularly blowing Social D (But not NY) off the stage; and then Jane's Addiction - possibly inspiring Perry Farrell's later song, Pets(?). But even if commercial success was out of reach for the band, they recorded two acclaimed pre-grunge hard rock albums.

As a coda, The Buck Pets released the more restrained, melancholy album To the Quick in 1993 on the independent label Restless.

On April 10, 2010, The Buck Pets reunited for a one night show at the club Trees in the Deep Ellum area of Dallas, Texas and released RARES (and unreleased) a collection of rare and previously unreleased material.

INFLUENCES: The Replacements, Buzzcocks and The Jesus and Mary Chain

== Members ==
- Tony Alba – drums
- Ian Beach – bass
- Ricky Pearson – drums (To the Quick)
- Chris Savage – guitar, vocals
- Chuck Smith – bass (The Sound of Deep Ellum)
- Andy Thompson – guitar, lead vocals

== Discography ==
Albums

- The Buck Pets (Island, 1989)
- Mercurotones (Island, 1990)
- To the Quick (Restless, 1993)
- RARES (and unreleased) (Self-published, 2010)

Singles

Year	Title	Chart positions	Album
Year	Title	US Modern Rock	Album
1991	"Libertine"	25	Mercurotones
