= Merkin Ball =

Two-song single by Pearl Jam

EP by Pearl Jam
- Released: December 4, 1995
- Recorded: February 1995
- Studios: Bad Animals (Seattle, Washington)
- Genres: Alternative rock; grunge
- Length: 10:52
- Label: Epic
- Producer: Brett Eliason

Pearl Jam chronology
Vitalogy (1994)	Merkin Ball (1995)	No Code (1996)

"I Got Id"

Single by Pearl Jam

from the EP Merkin Ball
- B-side: "Long Road"
- Released: December 4, 1995
- Recorded: February 1995
- Studio: Bad Animals (Seattle, Washington)
- Genre: Alternative rock
- Length: 4:53
- Label: Epic
- Songwriter: Eddie Vedder
- Producer: Brett Eliason

Pearl Jam singles chronology
"Immortality" (1995)	"I Got Id" (1995)	"Who You Are" (1996)

Merkin Ball is an extended play (EP) by American alternative rock band Pearl Jam. The EP contains two songs: A-side "I Got Id" (also known as "I Got Shit") and B-side "Long Road", both written by Pearl Jam lead singer Eddie Vedder. The EP features uncredited vocals and various instruments by Canadian-American musician Neil Young and was released on December 4, 1995, through Epic Records. Merkin Ball is a companion to Young's 1995 album Mirror Ball.

The EP became a chart hit, particularly in Australia and Scandinavia. It reached number two in Australia, number three in Finland, number five in Norway, and number 10 in Denmark. In the United States, the EP peaked at number seven on the Billboard Hot 100, number two on the Billboard Album Rock Tracks chart, and number three on the Billboard Modern Rock Tracks chart. It has been certified gold by the Recording Industry Association of America (RIAA). "I Got Id" was included on Pearl Jam's 2004 greatest hits album, rearviewmirror (Greatest Hits 1991–2003).

== Recording ==
The tracks on Merkin Ball were recorded at the tail end of the Mirror Ball sessions in February 1995. The songs were produced and mixed by Pearl Jam sound engineer Brett Eliason. Pearl Jam vocalist Eddie Vedder was not around much for the Mirror Ball recording sessions due to what he called a "pretty intense stalker problem". Vedder said that "leaving the house wasn't the easiest thing to do." He referred to the issue in the song "Lukin" from Pearl Jam's 1996 album, No Code.

Vedder wrote and performed vocals and guitar on the songs "I Got Id" and "Long Road", which were omitted from Mirror Ball. Because of legal complications between Epic Records and Reprise Records, the songs and the band name "Pearl Jam" were not allowed to be included on the full Mirror Ball album, so they were released separately as a Pearl Jam single. Neil Young contributed lead guitar to "I Got Id" and pump organ to "Long Road". Mirror Ball producer Brendan O'Brien plays bass on "I Got Id", and Pearl Jam bassist Jeff Ament plays bass on "Long Road". Pearl Jam drummer Jack Irons plays drums on both tracks. Pakistani Qawwali singer Nusrat Fateh Ali Khan contributed backing vocals to a later recording of "Long Road".

== Music and lyrics ==
Mirror Ball and Merkin Ball complement each other musically. Jonathan Cohen of AllMusic said that "I Got Id" was "an even mix of Vitalogy's raw rock and No Code's major-key majesty" and said regarding "Long Road" that "Vedder's melody is uplifting, his lyrics poignant." "I Got Id" is also known by its original title "I Got Shit" by the band and its fans. It is rumored that when Vedder proposed the idea of a single to Epic, the label made him change the title of the song. In some concert performances, Vedder has also introduced the song as "I Got I.D.". Upon introducing the song at Pearl Jam's September 19, 1998, concert in Washington, D.C. at Constitution Hall, Vedder stated, "[Neil Young] gave me a song writing lesson at a half-price rate; this is what I came up with...on my final, he gave me a B+ I think." At Pearl Jam's May 10, 2006, concert in Toronto, Ontario, Canada, at the Air Canada Centre, Vedder revealed that the song's chorus melody was inspired by the verse melody in Neil Young's "Cinnamon Girl" from the 1969 album, Everybody Knows This Is Nowhere.

At Pearl Jam's July 7, 2006, concert in San Diego at Cox Arena, Vedder revealed that he wrote "Long Road" after hearing about the death of his former high school drama teacher and mentor, Clayton E. Liggett. He added that he began to hit the opening D-chords of "Long Road" as if he was "trying to ring a bell to say that 'We lost one of the good ones,'" and after "about eight minutes", the rest of the performers on the track joined in without saying anything and began to bring the song to life.

== Release and reception ==
Professional ratings
Review scores
Source	Rating
AllMusic	2.5/5 stars
Entertainment Weekly	B+

In Australia and the United Kingdom, Epic Records released Merkin Ball on December 4, 1995. In the UK, it was released on CD and 7-inch vinyl, while in Australia, only a CD was released. In Japan, Sony Records issued a CD single two weeks later, on December 21. David Browne of Entertainment Weekly gave Merkin Ball a B+. Browne called "I Got Id" a "standard PJ chest thumper" and stated that "Long Road" "[takes] Young and Pearl Jam into a mystical zone never hinted at on [Mirror Ball]." AllMusic staff writer Jonathan Cohen gave the record two and a half out of five stars, saying, "By no means essential, but well worth a spin."

Merkin Ball debuted and peaked at number seven on the US Billboard Hot 100; it remains Pearl Jam's highest-charting original single in the United States as well as their second-highest-charting single overall, behind "Last Kiss". It also reached number two on the Billboard Album Rock Tracks charts and number three on the Billboard Modern Rock Tracks chart. Worldwide, the EP reached number two in Australia, number three in Finland, number five in Norway and number ten in Denmark. It additionally became a top-forty hit in Ireland, the Netherlands, New Zealand, Sweden and the United Kingdom. It has been certified gold by the Recording Industry Association of America (RIAA) for shipments of over 500,000.

In September 2001, Vedder and Pearl Jam guitarist Mike McCready were joined by Young to perform "Long Road" at the America: A Tribute to Heroes benefit concert. "Long Road" was also used in the films Dead Man Walking, Outsourced, and Eat Pray Love and in the episode "My Five Stages" of the sitcom Scrubs.

== Packaging ==
A wrecking ball graces the cover art of Merkin Ball. Mirror Ball and Merkin Ball complement each other in the layout and content of the packaging. The title Merkin Ball is a play on Mirror Ball. A merkin is commonly known as a pubic wig. Vedder came up with the title. In an interview, Vedder said that the title refers to an "arrowhead".

== Live performances ==
"I Got Id" was first performed live at the band's February 21, 1995, concert in Osaka, Japan, at Kosei Nenkin Kaikan. Live performances of "I Got Id" can be found on various official bootlegs. A performance of the song is also included on the DVD Touring Band 2000.

== Track listing ==
All tracks are written by Eddie Vedder.

CD single
No.	Title	Length
1.	"I Got Id" (also known as "I Got Shit")	4:53
2.	"Long Road"	5:59
Total length:		10:52

== Personnel ==
Pearl Jam

- Jeff Ament – bass guitar on "Long Road"
- Jack Irons – percussion, drums
- Eddie Vedder – guitar, vocals

Additional musicians and production

- Neil Young – guitar, pump organ, vocals
- Brendan O'Brien – bass guitar on "I Got Id"
- Joel Bernstein – portraits
- Brett Eliason – production, engineering and mixing

== Charts ==
=== Weekly charts ===
Weekly chart performance for Merkin Ball/"I Got Id"
Chart (1995–1996)	Peak position
Australia (ARIA)	2
Canada Top Singles (RPM) "I Got Id"	78
Canada Rock/Alternative (RPM) "I Got Id"	2
Denmark (Tracklisten)	10
Europe (Eurochart Hot 100)	44
Finland (Suomen virallinen lista)	3
Iceland (Íslenski Listinn Topp 40)	26
Ireland (IRMA)	29
Netherlands (Dutch Top 40)	25
Netherlands (Single Top 100)	38
New Zealand (Recorded Music NZ)	17
Norway (VG-lista)	5
Scottish Singles Sales (Official Charts)	27
Sweden (Sverigetopplistan)	14
UK Singles (Official Charts)	25
US Billboard Hot 100 "I Got Id/Long Road"	7
US Alternative Airplay (Billboard) "I Got Id"	3
US Mainstream Rock Airplay (Billboard) "I Got Id"	2

=== Year-end charts ===
1996 year-end chart performance for Merkin Ball/"I Got Id"
Chart (1996)	Position
Canada Rock/Alternative (RPM)	48
US Billboard Hot 100	96
US Mainstream Rock Tracks (Billboard)	9
US Modern Rock Tracks (Billboard)	26

2001 year-end chart performance for Merkin Ball/"I Got Id"
Chart (2001)	Position
Canada (Nielsen SoundScan) "I Got Id"	166

== Certifications ==
Certifications for Merkin Ball
Region	Certification	Certified units/sales
United States (RIAA)	Gold	500,000^{^}
^{^} Shipments figures based on certification alone.
