= Wishlist (song) =

1998 single by Pearl Jam

Single by Pearl Jam

from the album Yield
- B-side: "U"; "Brain of J." (live)
- Released: May 5, 1998
- Length: 3:26
- Label: Epic
- Songwriter: Eddie Vedder
- Producers: Brendan O'Brien; Pearl Jam

Pearl Jam singles chronology
"Given to Fly" (1997)	"Wishlist" (1998)	"Last Kiss" (1999)

Audio sample
- file; help

"Wishlist" is a song by the American rock band Pearl Jam. Written by vocalist Eddie Vedder, "Wishlist" was released on May 5, 1998, as the second single from the band's fifth studio album, Yield (1998). In the United States, the song peaked at number six on both the Billboard Mainstream Rock and Modern Rock Tracks charts. The song was included on Pearl Jam's 2004 greatest hits album, rearviewmirror (Greatest Hits 1991–2003).

== Origin and recording ==
"Wishlist" was written by vocalist Eddie Vedder. Vedder used an EBow for his guitar solo on the song. According to Vedder about the song:

It was a stream-of-consciousness exercise. McCready booked studio time in a tiny studio here with our friend Stu behind the board and another friend playing drums. We don't have the discipline to sit down and teach each other parts, so you're writing simple chord changes that someone else can follow without having to take breaks to learn them. It was probably eight minutes long originally. I listened to the tape and picked out the better wishes.

== Lyrics ==
"Wishlist" is about Vedder seeking fulfillment of wishes desired, but he resolves his wishlist with the line "I wish I was as fortunate, as fortunate as me." When asked about the song, Vedder stated, "I thought I'd lighten up." The line "I wish I was the full moon shining off your Camaro's hood" references the car that belonged to Beth Liebling, Vedder's wife at the time. When played live, the song mirrors its roots as an improv, with Vedder changing the lyrics depending on his mood.

== Release and reception ==
"Wishlist" was released as a single in 1998 with a previously unreleased B-side titled "U", of which an alternate version can also be found on the compilation album Lost Dogs (2003). The song peaked at number 47 on the Billboard Hot 100 and number six on both the Billboard Mainstream Rock Tracks and Modern Rock Tracks charts. In Canada, the song charted on the RPM Alternative Top 30 chart, reaching number one and becoming Pearl Jam's third single to top that chart. "Wishlist" placed at number 13 on the year-end Alternative Top 30 ranking for 1998. The song additionally reached the top 30 in the United Kingdom and peaked at number 48 on the Australian Singles Chart.

In his review of Yield, Rob Sheffield of Rolling Stone magazine said, "The gentle power-pop nugget 'Wishlist', a silly love song that Vedder composed solo, might be the simplest song Pearl Jam have ever done. But it's also the most moving."

== Live performances ==
"Wishlist" was first performed live at the band's November 12, 1997, concert in Santa Cruz, California, at The Catalyst. The band played this song when it appeared on the Late Show with David Letterman in May 1998 in support of Yield. Live performances of "Wishlist" can be found on various official bootlegs. Performances of the song are also included on the DVDs Single Video Theory, Touring Band 2000, and Live at the Garden. In concert, the song is often extended, softly played, with a thoughtful outro jam, and sometimes segueing into another song such as the Buzzcocks' "Why Can't I Touch It". This can be heard on Live at the Garden especially.

On September 26, 2021, during his 2021 Ohana Fest solo performance, Vedder dedicated the song to Caleb, Jared and Nathan Followill of Kings of Leon, whose mother died the night before, and were originally set to appear at the festival; as well to comedian and SNL alumn Norm Macdonald, who died a week earlier, and Vedder considered a friend.

== Track listings ==
All songs were written by Eddie Vedder except where noted.

Standard 7-inch, CD, and cassette single

1. "Wishlist" – 3:26
2. "U" – 2:48
3. "Brain of J." (live) (Mike McCready, Vedder) – 2:57
- "Brain of J." was recorded live by Triple J on March 5, 1998, at Melbourne Park in Melbourne, Australia.

European CD single

1. "Wishlist" – 3:26
2. "U" – 2:48

== Charts ==
=== Weekly charts ===
Chart (1998)	Peak position
Australia (ARIA)	48
Canada Rock/Alternative (RPM)	1
Scottish Singles Sales (Official Charts)	26
UK Singles (Official Charts)	30
UK Rock & Metal (Official Charts)	1
US Billboard Hot 100	47
US Adult Alternative Airplay (Billboard)	9
US Adult Pop Airplay (Billboard)	39
US Alternative Airplay (Billboard)	6
US Mainstream Rock (Billboard)	6

=== Year-end charts ===
Chart (1998)	Position
Canada Rock/Alternative (RPM)	13
US Mainstream Rock Tracks (Billboard)	42
US Modern Rock Tracks (Billboard)	20
US Triple-A (Billboard)	45
