= Red Mosquito =

Song by Pearl Jam

from the album No Code
- Released: August 27, 1996
- Recorded: January–February 1996 at Studio Litho, Seattle
- Genre: Country rock swamp rock
- Length: 4:03
- Label: Epic
- Songwriters: Jeff Ament, Stone Gossard, Jack Irons, Mike McCready, Eddie Vedder
- Producers: Brendan O'Brien, Pearl Jam

"Red Mosquito" is a song by the American rock band Pearl Jam. Featuring lyrics written by vocalist Eddie Vedder and music co-written by bassist Jeff Ament, guitarists Stone Gossard and Mike McCready, and drummer Jack Irons, "Red Mosquito" is the eighth track on the band's fourth studio album, No Code (1996). Despite the lack of a commercial single release, the song managed to reach number 37 on the Billboard Mainstream Rock Tracks chart.

== Origin and recording ==
"Red Mosquito" features lyrics written by vocalist Eddie Vedder and music co-written by bassist Jeff Ament, guitarists Stone Gossard and Mike McCready, and drummer Jack Irons. At Pearl Jam's July 18, 2006 concert in San Francisco at the Bill Graham Civic Auditorium, Vedder said regarding McCready's lead guitar work, "In the studio, he played that part on that record...he played it with a Zippo lighter...an old Zippo lighter. It belonged to my grandpa and afterwards he asked if he could have it, and I said, 'no.' But, I found it the other day Mike, and I wanted to tell you I found it and I might give it back to you. I think you should have it."

== Lyrics ==
The lyrics for "Red Mosquito" were inspired by the events surrounding Pearl Jam's June 24, 1995 concert in San Francisco at Golden Gate Park. When introducing the song at Pearl Jam's July 18, 2006 concert in San Francisco, California at the Bill Graham Civic Auditorium, Vedder stated, "This next song is a connection to San Francisco ‘cause it was written in a hotel room here, in the midst of having a really, really bad day." Vedder was forced to stay at a San Francisco hospital after suffering from the effects of food poisoning, the same day the band was scheduled to play at Golden Gate Park in front of 50,000 people. Vedder left the hospital to play the show, but only managed to make it through seven songs. Neil Young filled in for Vedder for the rest of the show that day. Because of Vedder's health the band was forced to cancel the remaining dates of the short tour that they were on. When introducing the song at Pearl Jam's June 16, 2008 concert in Columbia, South Carolina at the Colonial Center, Vedder stated, "Alright, this one goes back aways. It's all about…uh…being trapped in a hotel room with an insect."

Regarding the situation, Vedder stated:

That whole [Golden Gate Park] thing was a blur based on some bad food. It was really, really bad. Looking back at it, it doesn't seem as intense as it was, but it was horrible. I just felt not human and looking back I should have got through that show somehow, and I think the fact that Neil [Young] was there made me feel like I could get off the hook in some way and I did go out for a few songs. I just didn't feel good about the whole thing, I felt swallowed up by the whole deal. It was just a situation where you couldn't go to work. But I think now I'd probably get through that show.

== Reception ==
Without being released as a single, "Red Mosquito" peaked at number 37 on the Billboard Mainstream Rock Tracks chart.

== Live performances ==
"Red Mosquito" was first performed live at the band's November 1, 1995 concert in Salt Lake City at the Delta Center. Live performances of "Red Mosquito" can be found on the live album Live on Two Legs and various official bootlegs. On their 2009 tour of Australia the band performed the song with Ben Harper on guitar.

== Personnel ==
- Eddie Vedder – vocals, guitar
- Jeff Ament – bass guitar
- Stone Gossard – guitar, vocals
- Mike McCready – guitar
- Jack Irons – drums

== Chart positions ==
Chart (1996)	Position
US Mainstream Rock Tracks	37
