= Jack Irons =

American drummer (born 1962)

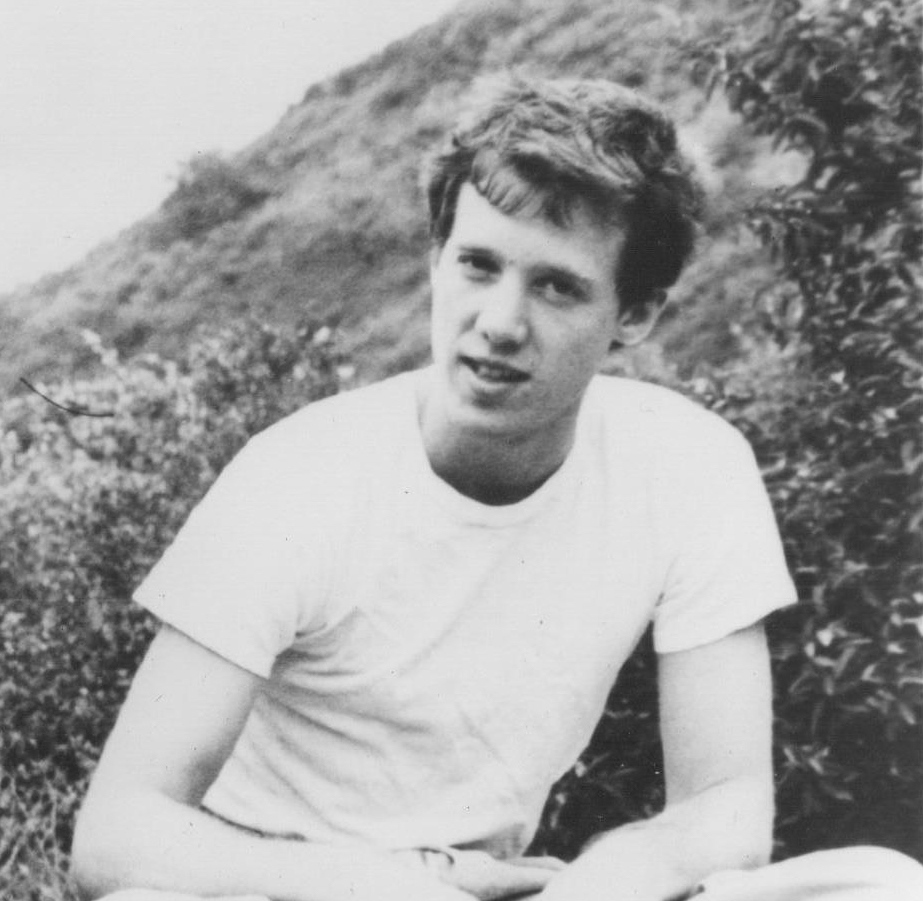
- Irons in 1984

Background information
- Born: Jack Steven Irons; July 18, 1962 (age 64); Los Angeles, California, U.S.
- Genres: Alternative rock, punk rock, art rock, funk rock, funk metal
- Occupation: Drummer
- Years active: 1976–present
- Labels: MCA, EMI, Capitol, Epic, Morgan Creek, RCA, Hollywood, Pollen, Breaching Whale, Sire
- Formerly of: Red Hot Chili Peppers, Pearl Jam, What Is This?, Eleven, Mark Lanegan Band, Spinnerette, The Latino Rockabilly War, Redd Kross, Raging Slab, The Wallflowers, The Les Claypool Frog Brigade
- Website: jackirons.com

Jack Steven Irons (born July 18, 1962) is an American drummer. He is the founding drummer of the rock band Red Hot Chili Peppers and is a former member of Pearl Jam.

Alongside his work with Red Hot Chili Peppers and Pearl Jam, Irons has been a member of Eleven, The Wallflowers and Mark Lanegan Band. He has worked with Joe Strummer, Pierce Bowers, and The Latino Rockabilly War, Redd Kross, Raging Slab, Spinnerette and The Les Claypool Frog Brigade. In 1995, Irons and the other members of Pearl Jam recorded and toured the Mirror Ball album with Neil Young. Irons has released two solo albums, Attention Dimension (2004) and No Heads Are Better Than One (2010).

Irons was inducted into the Rock and Roll Hall of Fame as a member of Red Hot Chili Peppers in 2012. Irons, along with former drummer Cliff Martinez, joined the band onstage for the first time in 24 years for a performance of their 1991 hit "Give It Away". Irons was an opening act in 2017 for Red Hot Chili Peppers on The Getaway World Tour.

== Biography ==
=== Early life ===
Jack Irons was born and raised in Los Angeles. He is from a Jewish background. Irons grew up using his family's cutlery as drumsticks, playing along to whatever was on the radio. He talked his parents into buying him a drum set, and took a drum class. Irons attended Bancroft Jr. High School in Hollywood, where he met future bandmates Michael "Flea" Balzary and Hillel Slovak. He then went on to attend Fairfax High School in Los Angeles alongside Balzary and Slovak, as well as future bandmates Anthony Kiedis and Alain Johannes. He and Slovak were both fans of Kiss, and they formed a tribute act. Irons was influenced by Jack DeJohnette, Stewart Copeland, and Keith Moon.

=== What Is This? and Red Hot Chili Peppers ===
As teenagers, Irons, Johannes, Slovak, and schoolmate Todd Strassman formed the band Chain Reaction in 1976. After its first gig, the band renamed itself Anthym. Slovak, dissatisfied with Strassman's bass playing, taught friend Michael "Flea" Balzary to play then replaced Strassman with Flea. After graduating high school, the band changed its name to What Is This? after a question often asked by people who heard the band play. Flea soon departed to play bass in the prominent Los Angeles punk band Fear. What Is This? continued, performing many shows along the California coast.

In 1983, Flea formed a "one-off" band, Tony Flow and the Miraculously Majestic Masters of Mayhem, with Kiedis, Slovak and Irons. Their performance was a hit and, after deciding to continue past the single concert, they changed their name to Red Hot Chili Peppers, quickly gaining popularity around Los Angeles. After six months, they earned a record deal with EMI and prepared to record its first album. Since What Is This? had signed a record deal two weeks earlier and Slovak and Irons considered Red Hot Chili Peppers a side project, they quit. With What Is This?, Irons recorded 1984's Squeezed (EP), 1985's 3 Out of 5 Live EP, and a full-length self-titled album that same year. The band broke up following the album's recording as Slovak became frustrated with the band and rejoined Red Hot Chili Peppers. In the meantime, Irons played on several recordings by Walk the Moon, a duo made up of Johannes and Natasha Shneider. In 1986, after learning that drummer Cliff Martinez had resigned, Irons returned to the Red Hot Chili Peppers.

Irons played drums on Red Hot Chili Peppers' first demo tape and their third album, 1987's The Uplift Mofo Party Plan. When Slovak died of a heroin overdose on June 25, 1988, Irons again quit the band because he did not want to be part of a group where his friends were dying. In 2006, Irons said Slovak's death had been such a huge shock that he had been suffering from depression ever since.

On August 12, 2012, Irons and Martinez performed "Give It Away" with Red Hot Chili Peppers at a Los Angeles concert. In 2017, Irons was an opening act for several dates on The Getaway World Tour.

=== Eleven ===
After Irons left Red Hot Chili Peppers, he went to a psychiatric hospital to receive treatment. After a brief stint with Joe Strummer's backing band the Latino Rockabilly War, Irons teamed up with Johannes and Shneider in 1990 to form Eleven. With Eleven, Irons recorded the albums Awake in a Dream (1991) and Eleven (1993). Midway through the recording of Eleven's third album, Thunk (1995), Irons left to drum with Pearl Jam, and Matt Cameron of Soundgarden played drums on the album's remaining four tracks. Irons returned to the band once again in 2002 prior to the recording of the band's fifth album, Howling Book (2003). Shneider died on July 2, 2008, following a battle with cancer. Prior to Shneider's death, the band was working on a sixth album due for release in the fall of 2008.

=== Pearl Jam ===
Bassist Jeff Ament and guitarist Stone Gossard invited Irons to join Mookie Blaylock, the band that became Pearl Jam, in 1990, when the band was first forming and still looking for a singer and a drummer. Although he did not join the band at that time because he was committed to Eleven, he did pass on a cassette of the band's work to a singer and local musician in San Diego named Eddie Vedder. Irons had formed a friendship with Vedder after meeting him through the Southern California music scene and played basketball with him. Vedder subsequently joined the band. Irons also called the Red Hot Chili Peppers in 1991 and asked the band to allow Vedder's new group to open for the band on its forthcoming Blood Sugar Sex Magik tour.

Irons became the drummer for Pearl Jam in late 1994 following the firing of drummer Dave Abbruzzese. His first recording with the band was "Hey Foxymophandlemama, That's Me" for Vitalogy (1994). Gossard said, "Jack entered the band right at the end of making Vitalogy. Jack's a breath of fresh air, a family man. Everybody had a strong sense of friendship with him immediately. He was just there to play drums and help out." Irons made his debut with the band at Neil Young's 1994 Bridge School Benefit, but he was not officially announced as the band's new drummer until its 1995 Self-Pollution satellite radio broadcast, a four-and-a-half-hour-long "pirate" broadcast out of Seattle, Washington which was available to any radio stations that wanted to carry it. Irons joined the group and played Pearl Jam's live shows supporting the Vitalogy album.

Irons performed with other members of Pearl Jam on Neil Young's 1995 album, Mirror Ball, and subsequently toured Europe as part of Young's backing band. Talking about the album, Young called drummer Irons "unbelievable." He stated that he "played his ass off on every take at every session," and added, "I can't say enough good things about him."

With Irons, Pearl Jam recorded its fourth studio album, No Code, released in 1996, for which Irons also toured. The band subsequently released Yield in 1998. "Do the Evolution" (from Yield) received a Grammy nomination for Best Hard Rock Performance. As a member of Pearl Jam, Irons brought a unique drumming style to the band, particularly in the way he played his fills and with his use of a trash can lid as a cymbal. Irons co-wrote the music for the No Code songs "Who You Are", "In My Tree", "Red Mosquito", and "I'm Open". He also wrote and sang on the Pearl Jam songs "Happy When I'm Crying" (from the 1997 fan club Christmas single), "●" (from Yield), and "Whale Song" (from the 1999 Music for Our Mother Ocean Vol. 3 compilation). He played with Pearl Jam through March 20, 1998. In 1998, prior to Pearl Jam's U.S. Yield Tour, Irons left the band due to dissatisfaction with touring. Pearl Jam's sound engineer Brett Eliason stated, "We went and did Hawaii and Australia with Jack. When we came back, Jack wasn't in a position to carry on. He made that decision more or less by himself. He can be a really great drummer but he had difficulty on tour putting out the energy for the length of shows they were doing. I don't know if he thought they'd put things on hold for him." Vedder said, "I think that him deciding that he wasn't going to be in the band really hurt." Coincidentally, Matt Cameron, from the recently split Soundgarden, replaced him again as he did four years prior on Eleven's Thunk.

== Other musical projects ==
=== Attention Dimension ===
On September 7, 2004, Irons released a solo album called Attention Dimension. Irons started creating his first pieces of drum music in 1994, but it wasn't until fall 1999, about a year after he left Pearl Jam, that he seriously began recording himself for a possible solo album. The album features appearances by former bandmates such as Alain Johannes, Flea, Eddie Vedder, Stone Gossard, Jeff Ament, and Les Claypool. Vedder contributed vocals to a cover of Pink Floyd's "Shine On You Crazy Diamond". Johnny Loftus of Allmusic said, "Attention Dimension is the drummer's chance to be in the bright white klieg light."

=== Collaborations ===
Aside from the aforementioned bands, Irons recorded and toured as a member of Joe Strummer's backing band The Latino Rockabilly War for the album Earthquake Weather (1989), and also toured with Redd Kross in support of the band's album Third Eye (1990). He appears in Redd Kross' promotional video for the song "Annie's Gone". In 1992, Raging Slab (a band notorious for having over 25 different drummers over the course of the band's 18-year career), complete with Irons on drums, began recording the follow-up to its 1989 RCA Records self-titled debut, with producer Michael Beinhorn at the helm. The entire album was recorded, mixed, and mastered; however when RCA Records executives heard the album, it was rejected. The album, titled Freeburden, remains unreleased. In 2000, Irons played as part of the initial line-up of Colonel Les Claypool's Fearless Flying Frog Brigade. Irons is featured on the track "Milky Ave" on the album Ultra Payloaded (2007) by Perry Farrell's band Satellite Party. Joining him on the album is former bandmate Flea. In 2012 he appeared on former Chili Pepper bandmate, Flea's debut solo EP Helen Burns. Aside from popular music, Irons has worked as a drumming advisor and teacher for numerous U.S. television projects. Irons appeared on five of the ten songs on To Be One With You, the debut solo album by former Red Hot Chili Peppers guitarist Josh Klinghoffer who released the album under the name Pluralone. The album was released on November 22, 2019. He then went on to record four songs on Josh's follow-up record, I Don't Feel Well released on October 16, 2020.

== Equipment ==
Irons currently endorses Masters of Maple Drums, Zildjian cymbals, and Pro-Mark drumsticks.

== Personal life ==
Irons has been diagnosed with bipolar disorder. About being diagnosed, he said "back in my twenties they said, 'When you get to your forties you might be able to turn a corner with this kind of a thing'. And I think that's very accurate. I had to learn to decipher sort of what was real and what was in my head. And that took time."

He is married and has two children. His son, Zach Irons, is founder and lead guitarist for Irontom. In September 2015, Zach Irons became lead guitarist for AWOLNATION.

== Discography ==
=== What Is This? discography ===
Year	Title	Label
1984	Squeezed	MCA
1985	What Is This?	MCA
1985	3 Out of 5 Live	MCA

=== Red Hot Chili Peppers discography ===
Year	Title	Label	Track(s)
1984	The Red Hot Chili Peppers	EMI/Capitol	Does not perform on album however co-wrote "Baby Appeal", "Get Up and Jump", "Green Heaven", "Out in L.A., and "Police Helicopter"
1985	Freaky Styley	EMI/Capitol Records	Does not perform on album however co-wrote "Nevermind" and "Sex Rap"
1987	The Uplift Mofo Party Plan	EMI/Capitol Records	All
1988	The Abbey Road E.P.	EMI/Capitol	"Fire" and "Backwoods"
1989	Mother's Milk	EMI/Capitol	"Fire"
1992	What Hits!?	EMI	"Fight Like a Brave", "Behind the Sun", "Me and My Friends", "Backwoods", and "Fire"
1994	Out in L.A.	EMI	"Behind the Sun" (Ben Grosse remix), "Get Up and Jump" (demo version), "Out in L.A." (demo version), "Green Heaven" (demo version), "Police Helicopter" (demo version), "Nevermind" (demo version), "Sex Rap" (demo version), "You Always Sing the Same", "Stranded", "Flea Fly", and "Deck The Halls"
1997	The Best of Red Hot Chili Peppers	EMI/Capitol	"Behind the Sun", "Me and My Friends", "Fire", and "Fight Like a Brave"
1998	Under the Covers: Essential Red Hot Chili Peppers	EMI/Capitol	"Fire" and "Subterranean Homesick Blues"

=== Eleven discography ===
Year	Title	Label	Track(s)
1991	Awake in a Dream	Morgan Creek	All
1993	Eleven	Hollywood/Third Rail	All
1995	Thunk	Hollywood	All except "Why", "Seasick of You", "Big Sleep", and "No Ground"
2003	Howling Book	Pollen	All
2005	Killer Queen: A Tribute to Queen	Hollywood	"Stone Cold Crazy" (with Josh Homme)

=== Pearl Jam discography ===
Year	Title	Label	Track(s)
1994	Vitalogy	Epic	"Hey Foxymophandlemama, That's Me"
1995	Merkin Ball	Epic	All
1996	Home Alive: The Art of Self Defense	Epic	"Leaving Here"
1996	M.O.M., Vol. 1: Music for Our Mother Ocean	Interscope	"Gremmie Out of Control"
1996	No Code	Epic	All
1996	Hype!: The Motion Picture Soundtrack	Sub Pop	"Not for You" (live from Self-Pollution Radio)
1997	The Bridge School Concerts, Vol. 1	Reprise	"Nothingman" (live)
1998	Yield	Epic	All
1998	Chicago Cab: Soundtrack	Loosegroove	"Who You Are"
1999	M.O.M., Vol. 3: Music for Our Mother Ocean	Hollywood	"Whale Song"
2003	Lost Dogs	Epic	"All Night", "Don't Gimme No Lip", "Black, Red, Yellow", "Leaving Here", "Gremmie Out of Control", "Whale Song", and "Dead Man"
2004	Rearviewmirror	Epic	"I Got Id", "Hail, Hail", "Do the Evolution", "Who You Are", "Off He Goes", "Given to Fly", and "Wishlist"
2007	Arctic Tale: Music from and Inspired By the Motion Picture	BulletProof	"Whale Song"
2023	Give Way	Epic	All

=== Solo discography ===
Year	Title	Label
2004	Attention Dimension	Breaching Whale
2010	No Heads Are Better Than One	The Orchard / Ten Club
2011	Blue Manatee	Kalaidoscope Groove-BMI
2022	Koi Fish in Space	Org Music

=== Spinnerette discography ===
Year	Title	Label
2008	Ghetto Love EP	Anthem
2009	Spinnerette	Anthem

=== Contributions and collaborations ===
Year	Group	Title	Label	Track(s)
1988	Joe Strummer	Permanent Record: Music from the Original Motion Picture Soundtrack	Epic/CBS	"Trash City", "Baby the Trans", "Nefertiti Rock", "Nothin' 'bout Nothin'", and "Theme from Permanent Record"
1989	Keith Levene	Keith Levene's Violent Opposition	Rykodisc	Some
1989	Joe Strummer	Earthquake Weather	Epic	"Gangsterville", "Slant Six", "Shouting Street", "Sikorsky Parts", "Jewellers and Bums", and "Ride Your Donkey"
1990	The Buck Pets	Mercurotones	Island	Majority
1991	Michelle Shocked	Arkansas Traveler	Mercury	Some
1993	Sun-60	Only	Epic	"Mary X-Mess" and "Tell Me Like You Know"
1993	The Buck Pets	To the Quick	Restless	Rocket to You (from demo sessions)
1994	Ethan Hawke	Reality Bites: Original Motion Picture Soundtrack	RCA	"I'm Nuthin'"
1995	Carole Pope	Radiate	Joan Tone Music	"Kiss the Ground'"
1995	Neil Young	Mirror Ball	Reprise	All
2007	Satellite Party	Ultra Payloaded	Columbia	"Milky Ave"
2010	Hole	Nobody's Daughter	Mercury	Some
2012	Mark Lanegan	Blues Funeral	4AD	All
2012	Flea	Helen Burns	Warner Bros	"333" and "Lovelovelove"
2019	Pluralone	To Be One With You	ORG Music	"Barreling", "Rat Bastards at Every Turn", "Was Never There", "Shade", "Mourning", "Overflowing", "Obscene" and "Nowhere I Am"
2020	Pluralone	I Don't Feel Well	ORG Music	"Red Don't Feel", "The Night Won't Scare Me", "Carry", "Plank", and "Sevens"
