= Given to Fly =

1997 single by Pearl Jam

Single by Pearl Jam

from the album Yield
- B-side: "Pilate"; "Leatherman"
- Released: December 22, 1997
- Genre: Rock
- Length: 4:01
- Label: Epic
- Composer: Mike McCready
- Lyricist: Eddie Vedder
- Producers: Brendan O'Brien; Pearl Jam

Pearl Jam singles chronology
"Off He Goes" (1996)	"Given to Fly" (1997)	"Wishlist" (1998)

Audio sample
- file; help

"Given to Fly" is a song by the American rock band Pearl Jam. Featuring lyrics written by vocalist Eddie Vedder and music written by guitarist Mike McCready, "Given to Fly" was released to radio on December 22, 1997, as the first single from the band's fifth studio album, Yield (1998).

"Given to Fly" proved to be the album's most popular single. The song topped the US Billboard Mainstream Rock Tracks chart and eventually peaked at number 21 on the Billboard Hot 100. Worldwide, the single reached number five in Finland, number six in Norway and Spain, and the top 20 in Australia, Iceland, Ireland, New Zealand, and the United Kingdom. The song was included on Pearl Jam's 2004 greatest hits album, rearviewmirror (Greatest Hits 1991–2003).

== Origin and recording ==
"Given to Fly" features lyrics written by vocalist Eddie Vedder and music written by guitarist Mike McCready, although loosely based on Led Zeppelin's "Going to California". McCready said he came up with the guitar riff after being stuck in his condo on a snowy day in Seattle. McCready on the song:

It was snowing here in Seattle, which it rarely does, and so they kind of shut down all the streets and I couldn't get my car out of the driveway. And I have a Volvo and you'd think those would be able to drive in the snow, but no, it wasn't going anywhere, so I was kind of stuck in my condo. And I wrote that riff [for "Given to Fly"] and the "Faithfull" riff that day.

== Composition ==
The main riff is written in the DADGAD alternate tuning. Regarding the song, McCready said, "I just kind of imagined ["Given to Fly"] as sort of a wave in an ocean: It starts out slow and then it gets a little larger and a little larger and then it breaks and then it comes down again. And that's metaphorically how I think of that song." Drummer Jack Irons stated that "on "Given to Fly", I play a beat that's based around the toms, but it's pretty soft. I'm not sure I would have been comfortable playing that way a few years ago."

== Lyrics ==
Vedder about "Given to Fly":

[I imagined the song as] a 20-page cardboard (children's) book with a line on each page and a picture to go with it. It's a fable, that's all. The music almost gives you this feeling of flight, and I really love singing the part at the end, which is all about rising above anybody's comments about what you do and still giving your love away. You know? Not becoming bitter and reclusive, not condemning the whole world because of the actions of a few.

== Release ==
"Given to Fly" was released to radio on December 22, 1997, and was issued as a CD and cassette single on January 6, 1998, with a previously unreleased B-side titled "Leatherman" (about the 19th century vagabond known by that name). "Given to Fly" was featured in a commercial advertising Yield which emulated the album's cover art. "Given to Fly" became the most successful song from Yield on the American rock charts. The song peaked at number 21 on the Billboard Hot 100, number one on the Billboard Mainstream Rock Tracks chart, and number three on the Billboard Modern Rock Tracks chart. The song spent a total of six weeks at number one on the Mainstream Rock Tracks chart and 10 weeks at number three on the Modern Rock Tracks chart.

In Canada, "Given to Fly" reached the top 30 on the Canadian RPM 100 Hit Tracks chart and later appeared on the RPM Alternative 30, where it reached number one and became Pearl Jam's second single to top that chart. "Given to Fly" reached the UK top 20 and peaked at number 13 on the Australian Singles Chart. It reached number 67 in Germany, the top 40 in the Netherlands and Switzerland, the top 30 in Sweden, the top 20 in Ireland and New Zealand, and the top 10 in Finland, Norway, and Spain.

== Critical reception ==
In AllMusic's review of the "Given to Fly" single, it was stated that "Given to Fly" is "a soaring epic that goes a long way in conveying Yield's majestic splendor. Frontman Eddie Vedder narrates the tale of a misunderstood, near-Messianic youth in front of hushed verses that explode into stratospheric choruses." Billboard called "Given to Fly" "a slow-building rocker that doesn't risk scaring off die-hards" in its review of the song. In addition, it was stated that "it's catchy and crisp enough to make the grade with popsters."

The guitar part and main vocal melody in the song have been noted for their similarities to Led Zeppelin's "Going to California" from the 1971 album Led Zeppelin IV. Tom Lanham of Entertainment Weekly said in his review of the song, "This latest PJ perambulator not only apes vintage Page/Plant latticework but also blatantly nicks the entire melody line from Led Zeppelin's delicate 'Going to California' ...Still, the song builds into such an emotional crescendo that it almost shakes its historical shackles. Almost." When asked about the similarities, guitarist Mike McCready stated, "It's probably some sort of rip off of it I'm sure...Whether it's conscious or unconscious but that was definitely one of the songs I was listening to for sure. Zeppelin was definitely an influence on that." At a 2005 benefit concert in Chicago for Hurricane Katrina relief, Pearl Jam performed the song in concert with Robert Plant in attendance. The band then segued "Given to Fly" into "Going to California", with Plant joining in.

== Live performances ==
"Given to Fly" was first performed live at the band's November 12, 1997, concert in Santa Cruz, California at The Catalyst. Pearl Jam performed the song in 2005 for the ReAct Now: Music & Relief benefit concert. Live performances of "Given to Fly" can be found on the live album Live on Two Legs, various official bootlegs, the Live at the Gorge 05/06 box set, and the live album Live at Lollapalooza 2007. Performances of the song are also included on the DVDs Single Video Theory and Touring Band 2000. The song was performed on September 26, 2015, at the Global Citizens Festival in Central Park, and it was dedicated to Malala Yousafzai. This version featured Eddie changing the lyrics slightly to fit her story. The song was also played at the Rock and Roll Hall of Fame April 7, 2017, where the band dedicated it to Michael J. Fox. At a concert in Philadelphia on September 7, 2024, the band dedicated a performance of the song to Johnny Gaudreau & his brother Matthew who were killed 8 days prior in nearby Oldmans Township, New Jersey

== Track listings ==
Standard 7-inch, CD, and cassette single

1. "Given to Fly" (Mike McCready, Eddie Vedder)
2. "Pilate" (Jeff Ament)
3. "Leatherman" (Vedder)

European CD single

1. "Given to Fly" (McCready, Vedder)
2. "Leatherman" (Vedder)

== Charts ==
=== Weekly charts ===
Chart (1998)	Peak position
Australia (ARIA)	13
Belgium (Ultratip Bubbling Under Flanders)	13
Canada Top Singles (RPM)	24
Canada Rock/Alternative (RPM)	1
Europe (Eurochart Hot 100)	33
Finland (Suomen virallinen lista)	5
Germany (GfK)	67
Iceland (Íslenski Listinn Topp 40)	16
Ireland (IRMA)	18
Netherlands (Dutch Top 40)	25
Netherlands (Single Top 100)	36
New Zealand (Recorded Music NZ)	12
Norway (VG-lista)	6
Scottish Singles Sales (Official Charts)	13
Spain (AFYVE)	6
Sweden (Sverigetopplistan)	29
Switzerland (Schweizer Hitparade)	39
UK Singles (Official Charts)	12
US Billboard Hot 100	21
US Alternative Airplay (Billboard)	3
US Mainstream Rock (Billboard)	1

=== Year-end charts ===
Chart (1998)	Position
Canada Rock/Alternative (RPM)	23
US Mainstream Rock Tracks (Billboard)	11
US Modern Rock Tracks (Billboard)	13

== Certifications ==
Region	Certification	Certified units/sales
Australia (ARIA)	Gold	35,000^{^}
New Zealand (RMNZ)	Gold	15,000^{‡}
^{^} Shipments figures based on certification alone.^{‡} Sales+streaming figures based on certification alone.

== Release history ==
Region	Date	Format(s)	Label(s)	Ref(s).
United States	December 22, 1997	Radio	Epic	
United States	January 6, 1998	CD; cassette	Epic	
United Kingdom	January 19, 1998	7-inch vinyl; CD; cassette	Epic	
Japan	January 28, 1998	CD	Sony	

== See also ==
- List of Billboard Mainstream Rock number-one songs of the 1990s
