= Vs. Tour =

1993–94 concert tour by Pearl Jam

- Tour by Pearl Jam
- Location: United States
- Associated album: Vs.
- Start date: October 28, 1993
- End date: April 17, 1994
- Legs: 2
- No. of shows: 52

Pearl Jam concert chronology
- 1993 European and North American Tour (1993); Vs. Tour (1993–94); Vitalogy Tour (1995)

The Vs. Tour was a concert tour by the American rock band Pearl Jam to support its second album, Vs.

== History ==
Pearl Jam promoted Vs. with tours in the United States in the fall of 1993 and the spring of 1994. The fall 1993 tour focused on the Western United States, while the spring 1994 tour focused on the Eastern United States. Industry insiders compared Pearl Jam's tour to the touring habits of Led Zeppelin, in that the band "ignored the press and took its music directly to the fans." During this tour the band set a cap on ticket prices in the attempt to thwart scalpers.

During the tour Pearl Jam concurrently worked on its third album. Several songs from the band's third album, Vitalogy, were premiered during this tour. These include "Last Exit", "Spin the Black Circle", "Not for You", "Tremor Christ", "Nothingman", "Whipping", "Corduroy", "Satan's Bed", "Better Man", and "Immortality".

On the evening of November 5, 1993, Pearl Jam partnered with Goldenvoice to put on a show in Indio, California for nearly 25,000 fans on the lawn of Empire Polo Club, a venue that had never hosted a rock festival. The show is well known among fans because halfway through the set, fans in the pit began pelting the band with shoes, provoking Vedder and the band to walk off stage, only to come out and play the rest of the set from behind a wall of speakers. Although band management had chosen this untested and under-developed site as part of a boycott of Ticketmaster and the Southern California auditoriums it controlled, the show established the polo club's suitability for large-scale events. Paul Tollett, co-founder of Goldenvoice, said the concert sowed the seeds for an eventual music festival there, which later became the Coachella Valley Music and Arts Festival.

Pearl Jam's November 30, 1993 concert in Las Vegas at the Aladdin Theatre for the Performing Arts featured a reunion by the grunge band Green River. Participating in the reunion were Pearl Jam members Jeff Ament and Stone Gossard, Mudhoney members Mark Arm and Steve Turner, and Chuck Treece, who filled in on drums for Green River drummer Alex Vincent.

Pearl Jam was outraged when it discovered after a pair of shows in Chicago in March 1994 that ticket vendor Ticketmaster had added a service charge to the tickets. The band's April 3, 1994 concert in Atlanta at the Fox Theatre was broadcast live on the radio in the United States and was also eventually released as a part of the "Dissident"/Live in Atlanta box set released in Europe. On April 8, 1994, Nirvana frontman Kurt Cobain was found dead in his home in Seattle due to an apparent suicide, which deeply affected Pearl Jam vocalist Eddie Vedder. At the band's April 8, 1994 concert in Fairfax, Virginia at the Patriot Center, Vedder proclaimed, "I don't think any of us would be in this room tonight if it weren't for Kurt Cobain." Vedder later said that "the day that we found out about Kurt...I was just spinning. I was lost and didn't know if we should play, or if we should just go home, or if we should attend the services. I still have some regrets about that, even though in the end it was probably better that we played the last two weeks of the tour. I decided I would play those next two weeks and then I'd never have to play again." This was Pearl Jam's last tour with drummer Dave Abbruzzese.

Following the tour, the band brought a lawsuit against Ticketmaster that accused them of being a monopoly whose anticompetitive practices allowed markup prices of more than 30%. The band's intention was to get ticket prices lowered for its fans. Pearl Jam's plans for a 1994 summer tour were cancelled as a result of a Ticketmaster boycott.

== Tour dates ==
Information taken from various sources.

Date	City	Country	Venue	Opening act
Warm-Up Shows
October 25, 1993	Seattle	United States	Off Ramp Café	
October 27, 1993	Santa Cruz	United States	The Catalyst	American Music Club
United States Leg 1
October 28, 1993	San Francisco	United States	Warfield Theatre	Rollins Band
October 30, 1993	San Jose	United States	SJSU Event Center	Rollins Band
October 31, 1993	Berkeley	United States	Hearst Greek Theatre	Rollins Band, American Music Club
November 2, 1993	San Diego	United States	Civic Theatre	American Music Club
November 3, 1993	San Diego	United States	Civic Theatre	American Music Club
November 4, 1993	West Hollywood	United States	Whisky a Go Go	American Music Club
November 5, 1993	Indio	United States	Empire Polo Club	American Music Club, Weapon of Choice, Eleven
November 6, 1993	Mesa	United States	Mesa Amphitheatre	Bill Miller, Butthole Surfers
November 7, 1993	Mesa	United States	Mesa Amphitheatre	Bill Miller, Butthole Surfers
November 9, 1993	Albuquerque	United States	Convention Exhibition Hall	Butthole Surfers
November 11, 1993	Denton	United States	UNT Coliseum	Butthole Surfers
November 12, 1993	Dallas	United States	Moody Coliseum	Butthole Surfers
November 16, 1993	New Orleans	United States	Lakefront Arena	Mudhoney
November 17, 1993	New Orleans	United States	Lakefront Arena	Mudhoney
November 19, 1993	New Orleans	United States	Lakefront Arena	Mudhoney
November 20, 1993	Nacogdoches	United States	William R. Johnson Coliseum	Mudhoney
November 22, 1993	Little Rock	United States	Barton Coliseum	Mudhoney
November 23, 1993	Oklahoma City	United States	T&T Center	Mudhoney
November 24, 1993	Wichita	United States	Century II	Mudhoney
November 26, 1993	Boulder	United States	Balch Fieldhouse	Urge Overkill, Mudhoney
November 27, 1993	Boulder	United States	Balch Fieldhouse	Mudhoney
November 30, 1993	Las Vegas	United States	Aladdin Theatre for the Performing Arts	Mudhoney
December 1, 1993	Las Vegas	United States	Aladdin Theatre for the Performing Arts	Mudhoney
December 2, 1993	Reno	United States	Lawlor Events Center	Urge Overkill, Mudhoney
December 7, 1993	Seattle	United States	Seattle Center Arena	Urge Overkill, Six in the Clip
December 8, 1993	Seattle	United States	Seattle Center Arena	
December 9, 1993	Seattle	United States	Seattle Center Arena	Urge Overkill, Hater
United States leg 2
March 6, 1994	Denver	United States	Paramount Theatre	The Frogs
March 7, 1994	Denver	United States	Paramount Theatre	The Frogs
March 9, 1994	Pensacola	United States	Pensacola Civic Center	L7, Follow for Now
March 10, 1994	Chicago	United States	Chicago Stadium	The Frogs, Urge Overkill
March 13, 1994	Chicago	United States	New Regal Theater	The Frogs, Magic Slim and the MGs
March 14, 1994	St. Louis	United States	Fox Theatre	The Frogs, Grant Lee Buffalo
March 15, 1994	St. Louis	United States	Fox Theatre	The Frogs
March 17, 1994	West Lafayette	United States	Elliot Hall	Grant Lee Buffalo
March 19, 1994	Detroit	United States	Detroit Masonic Temple	Grant Lee Buffalo
March 20, 1994	Ann Arbor	United States	Crisler Arena	Grant Lee Buffalo
March 22, 1994	Cleveland	United States	CSU Convocation Center	Grant Lee Buffalo
March 24, 1994	Louisville	United States	Louisville Gardens	King's X
March 25, 1994	Memphis	United States	Mid-South Coliseum	King's X
March 26, 1994	Murfreesboro	United States	Murphy Center	King's X
March 28, 1994	Miami	United States	Bayfront Amphitheater	King's X
March 29, 1994	St. Petersburg	United States	Bayfront Arena	King's X
April 2, 1994	Atlanta	United States	Fox Theatre	King's X
April 3, 1994	Atlanta	United States	Fox Theatre	King's X
April 6, 1994	Springfield	United States	Springfield Civic Center	Mudhoney
April 7, 1994	Rochester	United States	Rochester Community War Memorial	Mudhoney
April 8, 1994	Fairfax	United States	Patriot Center	Mudhoney
April 10, 1994	Boston	United States	Boston Garden	Mudhoney
April 11, 1994	Boston	United States	Boston Garden	Mudhoney
April 12, 1994	Boston	United States	Orpheum Theatre	Mudhoney
April 17, 1994	New York City	United States	Paramount Theatre	Mudhoney

Cancellations and rescheduled shows

November 28, 1993	Boulder	Balch Fieldhouse	Cancelled
November 30, 1993	Las Vegas	Sands Hotel	Moved to Aladdin Theatre
December 1, 1993	Las Vegas	Sands Hotel	Moved to Aladdin Theatre

== Band members ==
- Jeff Ament – bass guitar
- Stone Gossard – rhythm guitar
- Mike McCready – lead guitar
- Eddie Vedder – lead vocals, guitar
- Dave Abbruzzese – drums

== Songs performed ==
Originals

- "Alive"
- "Alone"
- "Angel"
- "Animal"
- "Better Man"
- "Black"
- "Blood"
- "Breath"
- "Corduroy"
- "Daughter"
- "Deep"
- "Dirty Frank"
- "Dissident"
- "Elderly Woman Behind the Counter in a Small Town"
- "Even Flow"
- "Footsteps"
- "Fuck Me in the Brain"
- "Garden"
- "Glorified G"
- "Go"
- "Hard to Imagine"
- "Immortality"
- "Indifference"
- "Jeremy"
- "Last Exit"
- "Leash"
- "Not for You"
- "Nothingman"
- "Oceans"
- "Once"
- "Out of My Mind"
- "Porch"
- "Rats"
- "Rearviewmirror"
- "Release"
- "Satan's Bed"
- "Spin the Black Circle"
- "State of Love and Trust"
- "Tremor Christ"
- "W.M.A."
- "Wash"
- "Whipping"
- "Why Go"
- "Yellow Ledbetter"

Covers

- "Across the Universe" (The Beatles) (snippet)
- "Ain't Nothing to Do" (Dead Boys)
- "American Pie" (Don McLean) (snippet)
- "Androgynous Mind" (Sonic Youth) (snippet)
- "Another Brick in the Wall" (Pink Floyd) (snippet)
- "Baba O'Riley" (The Who)
- "Beginning to See the Light" (The Velvet Underground) (snippet)
- "Crazy Mary" (Victoria Williams)
- "Fuckin' Up" (Neil Young)
- "Golden Years" (David Bowie) (snippet)
- "Happy Birthday" (traditional)
- "Happy Trails" (Dale Evans)
- "Hate the Police" (The Dicks) (snippet)
- "Hey Hey, My My (Into the Black)" (Neil Young) (snippet)
- "I Am a Patriot" (Steven Van Zandt)
- "I Won't Back Down" (Tom Petty)
- "I'm One" (The Who)
- "I've Got a Feeling" (The Beatles)
- "Instant Karma!" (John Lennon) (snippet)
- "The Kids Are Alright" (The Who)
- "Monkey Gone to Heaven" (Pixies) (snippet)
- "My Generation" (The Who)
- "The Real Me" (The Who) (snippet)
- "Rockin' in the Free World" (Neil Young)
- "Sail Away" (Neil Young) (snippet)
- "Sheraton Gibson" (Pete Townshend)
- "Shine" (Rollins Band) (snippet)
- "Sick o' Pussies" (Bad Radio) (snippet)
- "(Sittin' On) The Dock of the Bay" (Otis Redding)
- "Sonic Reducer" (Dead Boys)
- "Street Fighting Man" (The Rolling Stones)
- "Suck You Dry" (Mudhoney) (snippet)
- "Suspicious Minds" (Elvis Presley) (snippet)
- "Swallow My Pride" (Green River)
- "Sweet Emotion" (Aerosmith) (snippet)
- "Tearing" (Rollins Band) (snippet)
- "Three Little Birds" (Bob Marley and the Wailers)
- "Throw Your Arms Around Me" (Hunters & Collectors)
- "Tonight's the Night" (Neil Young) (snippet)
- "Young Man Blues" (Mose Allison) (snippet)
