= No Code Tour =

1996 concert tour by Pearl Jam

- Tour by Pearl Jam
- Location: North America; Europe
- Associated album: No Code
- Start date: September 16, 1996
- End date: November 25, 1996
- Legs: 2
- No. of shows: 19 in Europe; 14 in North America; 33 in total

Pearl Jam concert chronology
- Vitalogy Tour (1995); No Code Tour (1996); Yield Tour (1998)

The No Code Tour was a concert tour by American rock band Pearl Jam to support their fourth album, No Code.

== History ==
Pearl Jam promoted No Code with tours in North America and Europe in the fall of 1996. The short tour of North America focused on the East Coast of the United States. As with Vitalogy, very little touring was done in the United States to promote No Code because of the band's refusal to play in Ticketmaster's venue areas. The band chose to use alternate ticketing companies for the shows. Nevertheless, the band toured the United States playing shows in locations such as Downing Stadium on Randall's Island and The Meadows in Hartford, Connecticut. Chicago Bulls player Dennis Rodman attended the band's September 26, 1996 show in Augusta, Maine at the Civic Center, and during the climax of "Alive" came onstage to offer Vedder some red wine. To the excitement of the crowd, Vedder responded by hopping on Rodman's back and riding him piggyback style across the stage while singing. Rodman later received a Walkman carved with Vedder's initials containing the concert recording and cited this as one of his most thrilling experiences. A European tour followed in the fall of 1996. The band's November 3, 1996 show in Berlin, Germany at Deutschlandhalle was broadcast on many radio stations worldwide. This show is commonly called "Checkpoint Charlie" by fans.

During the North American tour fans complained about the difficulty in obtaining tickets and the use of non-Ticketmaster venues, which were judged to be out-of-the-way and impersonal. Guitarist Stone Gossard stated that there was "a lot of stress associated with trying to tour at that time" and that "it was growing more and more difficult to be excited about being part of the band." He added, "Ticketmaster, as monopolistic as it may be, is very efficient so we weren't playing the venues we wanted to play." This is their last full-date tour with Jack Irons, who later departed from the band during their 1998's Yield Tour.

== Tour dates ==
Information taken from various sources.

Date	City	Country	Venue	Opening act
North America
September 16, 1996	Seattle	United States	KeyArena	Fastbacks
September 21, 1996	Toronto	Canada	Maple Leaf Gardens	Fastbacks
September 22, 1996	Toledo	United States	Savage Hall	Fastbacks
September 24, 1996	Columbia	United States	Merriweather Post Pavilion	Fastbacks
September 26, 1996	Augusta	United States	Augusta Civic Auditorium	Fastbacks
September 28, 1996	New York City	United States	Downing Stadium	Fastbacks; Ben Harper
September 29, 1996	New York City	United States	Downing Stadium	Fastbacks; Ben Harper
October 1, 1996	Buffalo	United States	Marine Midland Arena	Fastbacks
October 2, 1996	Hartford	United States	Meadows Music Theater	Fastbacks
October 4, 1996	Charlotte	United States	American Legion Memorial Stadium	Fastbacks; Ben Harper
October 5, 1996	Charleston	United States	North Charleston Coliseum	Fastbacks
October 7, 1996	Fort Lauderdale	United States	Fort Lauderdale Stadium	Fastbacks
October 19, 1996^{[A]}	Mountain View	United States	Shoreline Amphitheatre	—N/a
October 20, 1996^{[A]}	Mountain View	United States	Shoreline Amphitheatre	—N/a
Europe
October 24, 1996	Millstreet	Ireland	Millstreet Arena	Fastbacks
October 26, 1996	Dublin	Ireland	Point Theatre	Fastbacks
October 28, 1996	London	England	Wembley Arena	Fastbacks
October 29, 1996	London	England	Wembley Arena	Fastbacks
November 1, 1996	Warsaw	Poland	Torwar Hall	Fastbacks
November 3, 1996	Berlin	Germany	Deutschlandhalle	Fastbacks
November 4, 1996	Hamburg	Germany	Alsterdorfer Sporthalle	Fastbacks
November 6, 1996	Amsterdam	Netherlands	Europahal	Fastbacks
November 7, 1996	Paris	France	Zénith de Paris	Fastbacks
November 9, 1996	Zürich	Switzerland	Hallenstadion	Fastbacks
November 12, 1996	Rome	Italy	Palazzo dello Sport	Fastbacks
November 13, 1996	Milan	Italy	Forum di Assago	Fastbacks
November 15, 1996	Prague	Czech Republic	Sportovní hala	—N/a
November 17, 1996	Budapest	Hungary	Budapest Sportcsarnok	Fastbacks
November 19, 1996	Istanbul	Turkey	Istanbul Expo Center	Fastbacks
November 21, 1996	Barcelona	Spain	Palau dels Esports de Barcelona	Fastbacks
November 22, 1996	San Sebastián	Spain	Velódromo de Anoeta	Fastbacks
November 24, 1996	Cascais	Portugal	Pavilhão Dramático	Fastbacks
November 25, 1996	Cascais	Portugal	Pavilhão Dramático	Fastbacks

Festivals and other miscellaneous performances
^{A} This concert was a part of the "Bridge School Benefit"

Cancellations and rescheduled shows

November 10, 1996	Munich, Germany	Olympiahalle	Cancelled

== Band members ==
- Jeff Ament – bass guitar
- Stone Gossard – rhythm guitar, lead guitar, vocals on "Mankind"
- Mike McCready – lead guitar
- Eddie Vedder – lead vocals, rhythm guitar, harmonica
- Jack Irons – drums

== Songs performed ==
Originals

- "Alive"
- "Animal"
- "Around the Bend"
- "Better Man"
- "Black"
- "Black, Red, Yellow"
- "Blood"
- "Corduroy"
- "Daughter"
- "Dissident"
- "Elderly Woman Behind the Counter in a Small Town"
- "Even Flow"
- "Footsteps"
- "Glorified G"
- "Go"
- "Habit"
- "Hail, Hail"
- "I Got Id"
- "Immortality"
- "In My Tree"
- "Indifference"
- "Jeremy"
- "Last Exit"
- "Long Road"
- "Lukin"
- "Mankind"
- "MFC" (snippet)
- "Not for You"
- "Nothingman"
- "Oceans"
- "Off He Goes"
- "Once"
- "Porch"
- "Present Tense"
- "Rats"
- "Rearviewmirror"
- "Red Mosquito"
- "Release"
- "Satan's Bed"
- "Smile"
- "Sometimes"
- "Spin the Black Circle"
- "State of Love and Trust"
- "Tremor Christ"
- "W.M.A." (snippet)
- "Wash"
- "Whipping"
- "Who You Are"
- "Yellow Ledbetter"

Covers

- "Androgynous Mind" (Sonic Youth) (snippet)
- "Another Brick in the Wall" (Pink Floyd) (snippet)
- "Bull in the Heather" (Sonic Youth) (snippet)
- "Cinnamon Girl" (Neil Young) (snippet)
- "Cut My Hair" (The Who) (snippet)
- "Fame" (David Bowie) (snippet)
- "Happiness Is a Warm Gun" (The Beatles) (snippet)
- "Heaven" (Talking Heads) (snippet)
- "Hunger Strike" (Temple of the Dog) (snippet)
- "I Am a Patriot" (Steven Van Zandt)
- "I Believe in Miracles" (Ramones) (snippet)
- "I Can't Explain" (The Who)
- "I'm One" (The Who) (snippet)
- "The Kids Are Alright" (The Who)
- "Leaving Here" (Edward Holland, Jr.)
- "Little Wing" (Jimi Hendrix) (snippet)
- "My Generation" (The Who)
- "No More Pain" (Embrace) (snippet)
- "The Noise of Carpet" (Stereolab) (snippet)
- "The Real Me" (The Who) (snippet)
- "Roadhouse Blues" (The Doors)
- "Rockin' in the Free World" (Neil Young)
- "Save It for Later" (The Beat) (snippet)
- "Song X" (Neil Young) (snippet)
- "Suck You Dry" (Mudhoney) (snippet)
- "Young Man Blues" (Mose Allison) (snippet)
