= Vitalogy Tour =

1995 concert tour by Pearl Jam

- Tour by Pearl Jam
- Location: Asia; Oceania; United States
- Associated album: Vitalogy
- Start date: February 18, 1995
- End date: November 7, 1995
- Legs: 3
- No. of shows: 17 in United States; 12 in Oceania; 7 in Asia; 36 in total

Pearl Jam concert chronology
- Vs. Tour (1993–94); Vitalogy Tour (1995); No Code Tour (1996)

The Vitalogy Tour was a concert tour by the American rock band Pearl Jam to support its third album, Vitalogy.

== History ==
Pearl Jam promoted Vitalogy with tours in Asia, Oceania, and the United States in 1995. The band was joined by new drummer Jack Irons. The short tour of the United States focused on the Midwest and the West Coast. The band continued its boycott against Ticketmaster during its tour of the United States, refusing to play in Ticketmaster's venue areas, but was surprised that virtually no other bands joined it in refusing to play at Ticketmaster venues. The band chose to use alternate ticketing companies for the shows.

The tour of the United States faced various troubles. Bassist Jeff Ament said that the band and its crew had to "[build] shows from the ground up, a venue everywhere we went." In June 1995, the band was scheduled to play at San Francisco's Golden Gate Park in front of 50,000 people. Before the concert vocalist Eddie Vedder was forced to stay at a hospital after suffering from the effects of food poisoning. Vedder left the hospital to play the show; however, he was not able to finish and ended up performing just seven out of twenty-one songs with the band. Neil Young filled in for Vedder for the rest of the show that day. Vedder said, "That whole [Golden Gate Park] thing was a blur based on some bad food. It was really, really bad. Looking back at it, it doesn't seem as intense as it was, but it was horrible. I just felt not human and looking back I should have got through that show somehow, and I think the fact that Neil [Young] was there made me feel like I could get off the hook in some way and I did go out for a few songs." Because of Vedder's health the band was forced to cancel the remaining dates of its tour of the United States. The Milwaukee dates at the Marcus Amphitheater and the Chicago date at Soldier Field were eventually reinstated and the rest of the dates were rescheduled for the fall.

About cancelling the dates, Vedder said, "I think we all agreed that it had gotten insane, that it was no longer about the music." Ament later said, "We were so hardheaded about the 1995 tour. Had to prove we could tour on our own, and it pretty much killed us, killed our career." A concert video of the Australian tour was planned, but later scrapped.

A professionally shot and edited video bootleg of the Pacific Leg tour has been circulating among fans for years, but was never officially released. Several scenes from this video can be seen in Pearl Jam Twenty, which was released in 2011.

== Tour dates ==
Information taken from various sources.

Date	City	Country	Venue	Opening act
Warm-up shows
February 5, 1995	Seattle	United States	Moore Theatre	
February 6, 1995	Seattle	United States	Moore Theatre	Magnog
February 8, 1995	Missoula	United States	Adams Fieldhouse	Shangri-La Speedway
Pacific leg
February 18, 1995	Sendai	Japan	Izumity 21	
February 20, 1995	Tokyo	Japan	Nippon Budokan	
February 21, 1995	Osaka	Japan	Kōsei Nenkin Kaikan	
February 24, 1995	Taipei	Taiwan	Taipei World Trade Center	Mudhoney
February 26, 1995	Pasay	Philippines	Folk Arts Theater	Mudhoney
February 28, 1995	Bangkok	Thailand	Indoor Stadium Huamark	Mudhoney
March 3, 1995	Singapore		The Indoor Stadium	Mudhoney
March 6, 1995	Perth	Australia	Perth Entertainment Centre	The Meanies
March 8, 1995	Adelaide	Australia	Memorial Drive Tennis Centre	The Meanies
March 10, 1995	Sydney	Australia	Sydney Entertainment Centre	The Meanies
March 11, 1995	Sydney	Australia	Eastern Creek Raceway	The Meanies
March 14, 1995	Canberra	Australia	Exhibition Park in Canberra	The Meanies, Cosmic Psychos
March 16, 1995	Melbourne	Australia	Flinders Park Tennis Centre	The Meanies
March 17, 1995	Melbourne	Australia	Flinders Park Tennis Centre	The Meanies
March 18, 1995	Melbourne	Australia	Sidney Myer Music Bowl	The Meanies
March 21, 1995	Brisbane	Australia	Brisbane Entertainment Centre	The Meanies
March 22, 1995	Brisbane	Australia	Brisbane Entertainment Centre	The Meanies
March 24, 1995	Auckland	New Zealand	Mt. Smart Super Top	The Dead Flowers
March 25, 1995	Auckland	New Zealand	Mt. Smart Super Top	The Dead Flowers
United States Leg 1
June 16, 1995	Casper	United States	Casper Events Center	Scollywags, Bad Religion
June 19, 1995	Morrison	United States	Red Rocks Amphitheatre	
June 20, 1995	Morrison	United States	Red Rocks Amphitheatre	
June 22, 1995	Sacramento	United States	Cal Expo Amphitheatre	
June 24, 1995	San Francisco	United States	Golden Gate Park	Bad Religion, Crash and Brittany
July 8, 1995	Milwaukee	United States	Summerfest, Marcus Amphitheater	Bad Religion, The Frogs
July 9, 1995	Milwaukee	United States	Summerfest, Marcus Amphitheater	Bad Religion, The Frogs
July 11, 1995	Chicago	United States	Soldier Field	Bad Religion, Otis Rush
United States Leg 2
September 13, 1995	Phoenix	United States	Veterans Memorial Coliseum	Ramones
September 14, 1995	Las Cruces	United States	Pan American Center	Ramones
September 16, 1995	Austin	United States	South Park Meadows	Ramones
September 17, 1995	New Orleans	United States	Tad Gormley Stadium	Ramones
November 1, 1995	Salt Lake City	United States	Delta Center	Fastbacks
November 2, 1995	Salt Lake City	United States	Delta Center	Fastbacks
November 4, 1995	San Jose	United States	Spartan Stadium	Fastbacks, Ben Harper
November 6, 1995	San Diego	United States	San Diego Sports Arena	Ramones
November 7, 1995	San Diego	United States	San Diego Sports Arena	Ramones

Cancellations and rescheduled shows

February 20, 1995	Kobe, Japan	Kokusai Kaikan	Cancelled
June 16, 1995	Boise	BSU Pavilion	Moved to Casper Events Center
June 17, 1995	Salt Lake City	Wolf Mountain Amphitheater	Rescheduled for November 1 and November 2, 1995 and moved to Delta Center
June 22, 1995	Lake Tahoe	Boreal Ridge Ski Resort	Moved to Cal Expo Amphitheatre
June 26, 1995	San Diego	Del Mar Fairgrounds	Rescheduled for November 6, 1995 and moved to San Diego Sports Arena
June 27, 1995	San Diego	Del Mar Fairgrounds	Rescheduled for November 7, 1995 and moved to San Diego Sports Arena
June 29, 1995	Phoenix	Veterans Memorial Coliseum	Rescheduled for September 13, 1995
June 30, 1995	Las Cruces	Pan American Center	Rescheduled for September 14, 1995
July 2, 1995	Austin	South Park Meadows	Rescheduled for September 16, 1995
July 4, 1995	New Orleans	Tad Gormley Stadium	Rescheduled for September 17, 1995

== Band members ==
- Jeff Ament – bass guitar
- Stone Gossard – rhythm guitar
- Mike McCready – lead guitar
- Eddie Vedder – lead vocals, guitar
- Jack Irons – drums

== Songs performed ==
Originals

- "Alive"
- "Animal"
- "Better Man"
- "Black"
- "Blood"
- "Brain of J."
- "Corduroy"
- "Daughter"
- "Dead Man"
- "Deep"
- "Dissident"
- "Elderly Woman Behind the Counter in a Small Town"
- "Even Flow"
- "Falling Down"
- "Footsteps"
- "Garden"
- "Glorified G"
- "Go"
- "I Got Id"
- "Habit"
- "Hey Foxymophandlemama, That's Me" (snippet)
- "Immortality"
- "Indifference"
- "Jeremy"
- "Last Exit"
- "Leash"
- "Long Road"
- "Lukin"
- "Not for You"
- "Oceans"
- "Once"
- "Porch"
- "Rats"
- "Rearviewmirror"
- "Red Mosquito"
- "Release"
- "Satan's Bed"
- "Spin the Black Circle"
- "State of Love and Trust"
- "Tremor Christ"
- "W.M.A."
- "Whipping"
- "Why Go"
- "Yellow Ledbetter"

Covers

- "Act of Love" (Neil Young)
- "Against the 70's" (Mike Watt)
- "Another Brick in the Wall" (Pink Floyd) (snippet)
- "Baba O'Riley" (The Who)
- "Catholic Boy" (Jim Carroll) (snippet)
- "Everyday People" (Sly & the Family Stone)
- "Forever in Blue Jeans" (Neil Diamond)
- "Happy Birthday" (traditional)
- "Hey Hey, My My (Into the Black)" (Neil Young) (snippet)
- "History Never Repeats" (Split Enz)
- "I Believe in Miracles" (Ramones) (snippet)
- "I Can't Explain" (The Who)
- "I Got You" (Split Enz)
- "I Only Play 4 Money" (The Frogs)
- "I Want You to Want Me" (Cheap Trick) (snippet)
- "(I'm Not Your) Steppin' Stone" (The Monkees) (snippet)
- "I'm One" (The Who) (snippet)
- "I've Just Seen a Face" (The Beatles)
- "Is There Anybody Out There?" (Pink Floyd) (snippet)
- "The Kids Are Alright" (The Who)
- "Leaving Here" (Edward Holland, Jr.)
- "Let My Love Open the Door" (Pete Townshend)
- "Little Wing" (Jimi Hendrix)
- "Maggot Brain" (Funkadelic)
- "The Needle and the Damage Done" (Neil Young)
- "Pulled Up" (Talking Heads) (snippet)
- "The Real Me" (The Who) (snippet)
- "Redemption Song" (Bob Marley & The Wailers)
- "Rockin' in the Free World" (Neil Young)
- "The Ship Song" (Nick Cave)
- "Sick o' Pussies" (Bad Radio) (snippet)
- "So You Want to Be a Rock 'n' Roll Star" (The Byrds)
- "Sonic Reducer" (The Dead Boys)
- "Starboy" (The Frogs)
- "Stuff and Nonsense" (Split Enz) (snippet)
- "Suggestion" (Fugazi) (snippet)
- "Talk About the Passion" (R.E.M.)
- "this boy." (that dog.)
- "Throw Your Arms Around Me" (Hunters & Collectors)
- "Touch of Grey" (Grateful Dead) (snippet)
- "Voodoo Chile" (The Jimi Hendrix Experience) (snippet)
- "Young Man Blues" (Mose Allison) (snippet)
