= Yield Tour =

1998 concert tour by Pearl Jam

- Tour by Pearl Jam
- Location: North America; Oceania
- Associated album: Yield
- Start date: February 20, 1998
- End date: September 23, 1998
- Legs: 3
- No. of shows: 49 in North America; 13 in Oceania; 62 in total

Pearl Jam concert chronology
- No Code Tour (1996); Yield Tour (1998); Binaural Tour (2000)

The Yield Tour was a concert tour by the American rock band Pearl Jam to support its fifth album, Yield. A live album of the third Melbourne date on March 5, 1998, Give Way, was released in April 2023 after its intended release in August 1998.

== History ==
Pearl Jam promoted Yield with tours in Oceania, and North America in 1998. Following the tour of Australia and before its summer tour of North America began, drummer Jack Irons left the band due to dissatisfaction with touring, marked his last tour with the band. Pearl Jam's sound engineer Brett Eliason stated, "We went and did Hawaii and Australia with Jack. When we came back, Jack wasn't in a position to carry on. He made that decision more or less by himself. He can be a really great drummer but he had difficulty on tour putting out the energy for the length of shows they were doing. I don't know if he thought they'd put things on hold for him." He was replaced on an initially temporary basis with former Soundgarden drummer Matt Cameron. Cameron said, "I got a phone call out of the blue, from Mr. Ed Ved, Stoney and Kelly. I was ambushed. It was really short notice. He called and said 'hey what are you doing this summer?'" Cameron learned over 80 songs in two weeks.

Pearl Jam's summer tour of North America marked the band's return to full-scale touring and the use of Ticketmaster, when previously the band had protested against the use of Ticketmaster. For this tour and future tours, Pearl Jam once again began using it in order to "better accommodate concertgoers." The first leg of the tour focused on the West Coast of the United States and the Midwest, and then the band moved to the East Coast for the tour's second leg. Cameron stated, "The guys made me feel real welcome and it wasn't a struggle to get it musically, but my style was a little bit different, I think, than what they were used to. And they've been through so many different drummers, I don't even know if they knew what they wanted. So, I just kind of played the way I played and then eventually we kind of figured out what worked best for the band." During the tour an organized fan campaign dubbed the "Breath Campaign" was started in which fans brought signs to shows requesting the song "Breath". After a four-year absence, "Breath" finally made a return appearance at the band's September 11, 1998 show in New York City at Madison Square Garden. The North American summer tour was a big success, and after it was completed the band released its first live album, Live on Two Legs, which featured select performances from the tour. Guitarist Mike McCready stated that the band released the live album due to the strength of Pearl Jam's shows on the tour.

== Tour dates ==
Information taken from various sources.

Date	City	Country	Venue	Opening act	Supporting
Warm-up shows
November 12, 1997	Santa Cruz	United States	The Catalyst	Odd Numbers	
November 14, 1997	Oakland	United States	Oakland Stadium		The Rolling Stones
November 15, 1997	Oakland	United States	Oakland Stadium		The Rolling Stones
November 18, 1997	Oakland	United States	Oakland Stadium		The Rolling Stones
November 19, 1997	Oakland	United States	Oakland Stadium		The Rolling Stones
South Pacific leg
February 20, 1998	Maui	United States	Alexander M. Baldwin Amphitheatre	Mudhoney	
February 21, 1998	Maui	United States	Alexander M. Baldwin Amphitheatre	Mudhoney	
February 26, 1998	Wellington	New Zealand	Queen's Wharf Events Centre	Shudder to Think	
February 28, 1998	Auckland	New Zealand	Ericsson Stadium	Shudder to Think	
March 2, 1998	Melbourne	Australia	Melbourne Park	Shudder to Think	
March 3, 1998	Melbourne	Australia	Melbourne Park	Shudder to Think	
March 5, 1998	Melbourne	Australia	Melbourne Park	Shudder to Think	
March 7, 1998	Adelaide	Australia	Thebarton Oval	Shudder to Think	
March 9, 1998	Sydney	Australia	Sydney Entertainment Centre	Shudder to Think	
March 11, 1998	Sydney	Australia	Sydney Entertainment Centre	Shudder to Think	
March 12, 1998	Sydney	Australia	Sydney Entertainment Centre	Shudder to Think	
March 14, 1998	Brisbane	Australia	Brisbane Entertainment Centre	Shudder to Think	
March 15, 1998	Brisbane	Australia	Brisbane Entertainment Centre	Shudder to Think	
March 19, 1998	Perth	Australia	Perth Entertainment Centre	Shudder to Think	
March 20, 1998	Perth	Australia	Perth Entertainment Centre	Shudder to Think	
North America leg 1
June 20, 1998	Missoula	United States	Washington–Grizzly Stadium	Goodness	
June 21, 1998	Park City	United States	The Canyons	Goodness	
June 23, 1998	Greenwood Village	United States	Fiddler's Green Amphitheatre	Frank Black	
June 24, 1998	Rapid City	United States	Rushmore Civic Center Arena	Frank Black	
June 26, 1998	East Troy	United States	Alpine Valley Music Theatre	Frank Black	
June 27, 1998	East Troy	United States	Alpine Valley Music Theatre	Frank Black	
June 29, 1998	Chicago	United States	United Center	Frank Black	
June 30, 1998	Minneapolis	United States	Target Center	Frank Black	
July 2, 1998	Maryland Heights	United States	Riverport Amphitheater	The Murder City Devils	
July 3, 1998	Bonner Springs	United States	Sandstone Amphitheater	The Murder City Devils	
July 5, 1998	Dallas	United States	Reunion Arena	The Murder City Devils	
July 7, 1998	Albuquerque	United States	Tingley Coliseum	Spacehog	
July 8, 1998	Phoenix	United States	Arizona Veterans Memorial Coliseum	Spacehog	
July 10, 1998	San Diego	United States	Cox Arena	Spacehog	
July 11, 1998	Las Vegas	United States	Thomas & Mack Center	Zeke, X	
July 13, 1998	Inglewood	United States	Great Western Forum	X, Tenacious D	
July 14, 1998	Inglewood	United States	Great Western Forum	X, Tenacious D	
July 16, 1998	Sacramento	United States	ARCO Arena	X	
July 18, 1998	Portland	United States	Rose Garden Arena	Frank Black	
July 19, 1998	Vancouver	Canada	Pacific Coliseum	Frank Black	
July 21, 1998	Seattle	United States	Memorial Stadium	Zeke, The Wallflowers	
July 22, 1998	Seattle	United States	Memorial Stadium	The Wallflowers, Sean Lennon	
North America leg 2
August 17, 1998	Noblesville	United States	Deer Creek Music Center	Iggy Pop	
August 18, 1998	East Lansing	United States	Breslin Student Events Center	Iggy Pop	
August 20, 1998	Montreal	Canada	Molson Centre	Cheap Trick	
August 22, 1998	Barrie	Canada	Molson Park	Cheap Trick, All Systems Go!, Hayden, Cracker, Matthew Good Band	
August 23, 1998	Auburn Hills	United States	The Palace of Auburn Hills	Cheap Trick	
August 25, 1998	Burgettstown	United States	Star Lake Amphitheatre	Iggy Pop	
August 26, 1998	Cuyahoga Falls	United States	Blossom Music Center	Iggy Pop	
August 28, 1998	Camden	United States	Blockbuster Music Entertainment Centre	Iggy Pop, Mudhoney	
August 29, 1998	Camden	United States	Blockbuster Music Entertainment Centre	Iggy Pop, Mudhoney	
August 31, 1998	Raleigh	United States	Hardee's Walnut Creek Amphitheatre	Mudhoney	
September 1, 1998	Atlanta	United States	Lakewood Amphitheater	Mudhoney	
September 3, 1998	Birmingham	United States	Birmingham-Jefferson Coliseum	Mudhoney	
September 4, 1998	Greenville	United States	BI-LO Center	Mudhoney	
September 6, 1998	Knoxville	United States	Thompson–Boling Arena	Mudhoney	
September 7, 1998	Virginia Beach	United States	GTE Virginia Beach Amphitheater	Mudhoney	
September 8, 1998	East Rutherford	United States	Continental Airlines Arena	Ben Harper	
September 10, 1998	New York City	United States	Madison Square Garden	Ben Harper	
September 11, 1998	New York City	United States	Madison Square Garden	Ben Harper	
September 13, 1998	Hartford	United States	Meadows Music Theater	Ben Harper	
September 15, 1998	Mansfield	United States	Great Woods	Ben Harper	
September 16, 1998	Mansfield	United States	Great Woods	Ben Harper	
September 18, 1998	Columbia	United States	Merriweather Post Pavilion	Ben Harper	
September 19, 1998	Washington, D.C.	United States	DAR Constitution Hall	Hovercraft	
September 22, 1998	West Palm Beach	United States	Coral Sky Amphitheatre	Rancid	
September 23, 1998	West Palm Beach	United States	Coral Sky Amphitheatre	Rancid	

== Band members ==
- Jeff Ament – bass guitar
- Stone Gossard – rhythm and lead guitar
- Mike McCready – lead guitar
- Eddie Vedder – lead vocals, guitar
- Jack Irons – drums (warm-up shows and South Pacific leg)
- Matt Cameron – drums (North America legs 1 and 2)

== Songs performed ==
Originals

- "Alive"
- "All Those Yesterdays"
- "Animal"
- "Around the Bend"
- "Better Man"
- "Black"
- "Blood"
- "Brain of J."
- "Breath"
- "Corduroy"
- "Daughter"
- "Dead Man"
- "Dissident"
- "Do the Evolution"
- "Elderly Woman Behind the Counter in a Small Town"
- "Even Flow"
- "Faithfull"
- "Footsteps"
- "Given to Fly"
- "Go"
- "Habit"
- "Hail, Hail"
- "Hard to Imagine"
- "I Got Id"
- "I'm Open" (snippet)
- "Immortality"
- "In Hiding"
- "In My Tree"
- "Indifference"
- "Jeremy"
- "Last Exit"
- "Leatherman"
- "Long Road"
- "Lukin"
- "Mankind"
- "MFC"
- "No Way"
- "Not for You"
- "Nothingman"
- "Oceans"
- "Off He Goes"
- "Once"
- "Pilate"
- "Porch"
- "Present Tense"
- "Push Me, Pull Me"
- "Rats"
- "Rearviewmirror"
- "Red Mosquito"
- "Release"
- "Smile"
- "Sometimes"
- "Spin the Black Circle"
- "State of Love and Trust"
- "Tremor Christ"
- "Untitled"
- "W.M.A." (snippet)
- "Whipping"
- "Who You Are"
- "Wishlist"
- "Yellow Ledbetter"

Covers

- "Act of Love" (Neil Young)
- "Androgynous Mind" (Sonic Youth) (snippet)
- "Angie" (The Rolling Stones) (snippet)
- "Another Brick in the Wall" (Pink Floyd) (snippet)
- "Baba O'Riley" (The Who)
- "Beast of Burden" (The Rolling Stones)
- "Beginning to See the Light" (The Velvet Underground) (snippet)
- "Candle in the Wind" (Elton John) (snippet)
- "Cinnamon Girl" (Neil Young) (snippet)
- "Come Together" (The Beatles) (snippet)
- "Crazy Mary" (Victoria Williams)
- "Don't Let the Sun Catch You Crying" (Gerry & the Pacemakers) (snippet)
- "Dueling Banjos" (Eric Weissberg and Steve Mandel) (snippet)
- "Fuckin' Up" (Neil Young)
- "Happy Birthday" (traditional)
- "Hey Hey, My My (Into the Black)" (Neil Young) (snippet)
- "Hunger Strike" (Temple of the Dog) (snippet)
- "I Am a Patriot" (Steven Van Zandt) (snippet)
- "I Believe in Miracles" (Ramones) (snippet)
- "I Got You" (Split Enz) (snippet)
- "I Hope I Never" (Split Enz) (snippet)
- "I Must Not Think Bad Thoughts" (X) (snippet)
- "I Wanna Live" (Iggy Pop) (snippet)
- "I Want You to Want Me" (Cheap Trick) (snippet)
- "I've Been Tired" (Pixies) (snippet)
- "Institutionalized" (Suicidal Tendencies) (snippet)
- "Interstellar Overdrive" (Pink Floyd) (snippet)
- "Jersey Girl" (Tom Waits) (snippet)
- "The KKK Took My Baby Away" (Ramones)
- "Last Kiss" (Wayne Cochran)
- "Leaving Here" (Edward Holland, Jr.)
- "Magic Bus" (The Who) (snippet)
- "MLK" (U2) (snippet)
- "Monkey Gone to Heaven" (Pixies) (snippet)
- "Mother" (John Lennon with the Plastic Ono Band) (snippet)
- "My City Was Gone" (The Pretenders) (snippet)
- "My Generation Blues" (The Who)
- "My Heart Will Go On" (Celine Dion) (snippet)
- "The Noise of Carpet" (Stereolab) (snippet)
- "Outshined" (Soundgarden) (snippet)
- "Pebbles" (Shudder to Think) (snippet)
- "Philadelphia Freedom" (Elton John) (snippet)
- "Rain" (The Beatles) (snippet)
- "Ray of Light" (Madonna) (snippet)
- "The Real Me" (The Who) (snippet)
- "Roam" (The B-52's) (snippet)
- "Rockin' in the Free World" (Neil Young)
- "Save It for Later" (The Beat) (snippet)
- "Soldier of Love (Lay Down Your Arms)" (Arthur Alexander)
- "Sonic Reducer" (The Dead Boys)
- "Stuff and Nonsense" (Split Enz) (snippet)
- "Suck You Dry" (Mudhoney) (snippet)
- "Surrender" (Cheap Trick) (snippet)
- "Sweet Home Alabama" (Lynyrd Skynyrd) (snippet)
- "Talk About the Passion" (R.E.M.) (snippet)
- "Three Little Birds" (Bob Marley & The Wailers) (snippet)
- "Throw Your Arms Around Me" (Hunters & Collectors)
- "Time Bomb" (Rancid) (snippet)
- "Trouble" (Cat Stevens)
- "White Girl" (X) (snippet)
- "The Whole of the Moon" (The Waterboys) (snippet)
- "The Wrong Child" (R.E.M.) (snippet)
- "Yeastie Girls Song" (Yeastie Girls) (snippet)

== Gallery ==
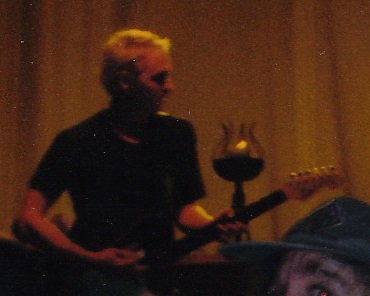
Mike McCready on stage with Pearl Jam in Columbia, Maryland on September 18, 1998.
