= Pearl Jam 1993 European and North American Tour =

1993 concert tour by Pearl Jam

1993 European/North American Tour
- Tour by Pearl Jam
- Location: Europe; North America
- Associated album: Vs.
- Start date: June 26, 1993
- End date: September 6, 1993
- Legs: 2
- No. of shows: 15 in Europe; 11 in North America; 26 in total

Pearl Jam concert chronology
- Lollapalooza 1992 (1992); 1993 European/North American Tour (1993); Vs. Tour (1993–94)

The Pearl Jam 1993 European/North American Tour was a concert tour by American rock band Pearl Jam.

== History ==
Pearl Jam embarked on this tour after completing the recording sessions for its second album, Vs. The Europe leg included a few shows in which the band opened for U2 on the band's Zoo TV Tour, while both legs included several shows in which the band opened for Neil Young on his Harvest Moon tour. Guitarist Mike McCready said that when the band opened for U2 in Europe the crowds hated Pearl Jam. The short tour of North America focused on Canada and the West Coast of the United States. When the band opened for Neil Young, Young often brought the band out for encores to perform "Rockin' in the Free World". Bassist Jeff Ament said that playing with Neil Young was "the most inspiring thing that we've ever been involved in."

== Tour dates ==
Information taken from various sources.

Date	City	Country	Venue	Opening act	Supporting
Warm-Up Shows
June 16, 1993	Missoula	United States	University Theatre, University of Montana	Orgone Box	
June 17, 1993	Spokane	United States	The Met	Lazy Susan	
Europe
June 26, 1993	Oslo	Norway	Sentrum Scene		
June 27, 1993	Oslo	Norway	Isle of Calf Festival (Kalvoya)		Neil Young
June 28, 1993	Stockholm	Sweden	Sjöhistoriska Museet	Red Fun	Neil Young
June 30, 1993	Helsinki	Finland	Jäähalli		Neil Young
July 2, 1993	Verona	Italy	Stadio Bentegodi		U2
July 3, 1993	Verona	Italy	Stadio Bentegodi		U2
July 6, 1993	Rome	Italy	Stadio Flaminio		U2
July 7, 1993	Rome	Italy	Stadio Flaminio		U2
July 10, 1993	Slane	Ireland	Slane Concert		Van Morrison, Neil Young
July 11, 1993	London	England	Finsbury Park	James, Teenage Fanclub, 4 Non Blondes	Neil Young
July 13, 1993	London	England	Brixton Academy	Tribe After Tribe	
July 14, 1993	London	England	Brixton Academy	Tribe After Tribe	
July 16, 1993	Rotterdam	Netherlands	Sportspaleis Ahoy	Tribe After Tribe	
July 17, 1993	Rotterdam	Netherlands	Sportspaleis Ahoy	Tribe After Tribe	
July 18, 1993	Amsterdam	Netherlands	Paradiso	Tribe After Tribe	
North America Leg
August 11, 1993	Calgary	Canada	Max Bell Arena	Cadillac Tramps	
August 12, 1993	Edmonton	Canada	Convention Center	Cadillac Tramps	
August 14, 1993	Gimli	Canada	Gimli Motorsport Park		
August 17, 1993	Hull	Canada	Robert Guertin Arena	Doughboys	
August 18, 1993	Toronto	Canada	Canadian National Exhibition Stadium	Blues Traveler, Soundgarden	Neil Young
August 19, 1993	Montreal	Canada	Verdun Auditorium	Doughboys	
September 2, 1993	Los Angeles	United States	The Viper Room	The Darling Buds	
September 4, 1993	Vancouver	Canada	BC Place Stadium		Neil Young
September 4, 1993	Seattle	United States	Rendezvous Club		
September 5, 1993	George	United States	The Gorge Amphitheatre	Blind Melon	Neil Young
September 6, 1993	Portland	United States	Portland Meadows	Blind Melon	Neil Young

== Band members ==
- Jeff Ament – bass guitar
- Stone Gossard – rhythm guitar
- Mike McCready – lead guitar
- Eddie Vedder – lead vocals, guitar
- Dave Abbruzzese – drums

== Songs performed ==
Originals

- "Alive"
- "Animal"
- "Black"
- "Blood"
- "Daughter"
- "Deep"
- "Dirty Frank" (snippet)
- "Dissident"
- "Elderly Woman Behind the Counter in a Small Town"
- "Even Flow"
- "Footsteps"
- "Garden"
- "Glorified G"
- "Go"
- "Hard to Imagine" (snippet)
- "Indifference"
- "Jeremy"
- "Leash"
- "Oceans"
- "Once"
- "Porch"
- "Rats"
- "Rearviewmirror"
- "Release"
- "State of Love and Trust"
- "W.M.A."
- "Whipping"
- "Why Go"

Covers

- "Across the Universe" (The Beatles) (snippet)
- "Angie" (The Rolling Stones) (snippet)
- "Baba O'Riley" (The Who)
- "Beast of Burden" (The Rolling Stones) (snippet)
- "Crazy Mary" (Victoria Williams)
- "Fuckin' Up" (Neil Young)
- "Gimme Shelter" (The Rolling Stones) (snippet)
- "The Kids Are Alright" (The Who)
- "MLK" (U2) (snippet)
- "Owner of a Lonely Heart" (Yes)
- "Pulled Up" (Talking Heads) (snippet)
- "The Real Me" (The Who) (snippet)
- "Rockin' in the Free World" (Neil Young)
- "Ruby Tuesday" (The Rolling Stones) (snippet)
- "Sonic Reducer" (The Dead Boys)
- "Suck You Dry" (Mudhoney) (snippet)
- "Sympathy for the Devil" (The Rolling Stones) (snippet)
- "Tearing" (Rollins Band) (snippet)
- "Tonight's the Night" (Neil Young) (snippet)
