= 11/30/93 – Las Vegas, Nevada =

Live album by Pearl Jam
- Released: 2006
- Recorded: November 30, 1993
- Venues: Aladdin Theatre for the Performing Arts, Paradise, Nevada, United States
- Genre: Grunge
- Length: 80:56
- Language: English
- Label: Ten Club

Pearl Jam live albums chronology
Live at Easy Street (2006)	11/30/93 – Las Vegas, Nevada (2006)	Live at the Gorge 05/06 (2007)

11/30/93 – Las Vegas, Nevada is a live album and the first in a series of archival official bootleg releases by the American alternative rock band Pearl Jam, made available in MP3 format at the band's official download website in 2006. The bootleg was recorded at the first of two nights at the Aladdin Theatre for the Performing Arts in Paradise, Nevada.

== Overview ==
The show, which took place on November 30, 1993, at the Aladdin Theatre for the Performing Arts in Paradise, Nevada, is from the first leg of the band's tour for its second album, Vs., but also features some material off of the band's third album, Vitalogy, including the live premiere of "Tremor Christ". The second encore featured two songs by the band Green River, guested on by former members Mark Arm and Steve Turner, both now of Mudhoney. Guitarist Stone Gossard and bassist Jeff Ament are both former members of Green River. Chuck Treece filled in on drums for Green River drummer Alex Vincent. The band performed the songs "Swallow My Pride" and "Ain't Nothing to Do" before leaving the stage. The bootleg does not include the version of "My Way", performed with Elvis impersonator Terry Presley, which had previously been released on the band's 1995 fan club Christmas single. The version of "Swallow My Pride" from this show appears on the same fan club single.

== Track listing ==
1. "Even Flow" (Eddie Vedder, Stone Gossard) – 5:02
2. "Once" (Vedder, Gossard) – 3:17
3. "Deep" (Vedder, Gossard, Jeff Ament) – 4:23
4. "Jeremy" (Vedder, Ament) – 6:27
5. "Dissident" (Dave Abbruzzese, Ament, Gossard, Mike McCready, Vedder) – 3:35 then Across the Universe
6. "Daughter" (Abbruzzese, Ament, Gossard, McCready, Vedder) – 5:26 then into Instant Karma
7. "Go" (Abbruzzese, Ament, Gossard, McCready, Vedder) – 3:01
8. "Animal" (Abbruzzese, Ament, Gossard, McCready, Vedder) – 2:49
9. "State of Love and Trust" (Vedder, McCready, Ament) – 3:39
10. "Tremor Christ" (Abbruzzese, Ament, Gossard, McCready, Vedder) – 3:56
11. "Black" (Vedder, Gossard) – 5:36
12. "Blood" (Abbruzzese, Ament, Gossard, McCready, Vedder) – 2:38
13. "Alive" (Vedder, Gossard) – 5:16
14. "Rearviewmirror" (Abbruzzese, Ament, Gossard, McCready, Vedder) – 5:02
15. "Whipping" (Abbruzzese, Ament, Gossard, McCready, Vedder) – 2:39
16. "Leash" (Abbruzzese, Ament, Gossard, McCready, Vedder) – 3:09
17. "Porch" (Vedder) – 6:55
18. "Swallow My Pride" (Mark Arm, Steve Turner) (with Mark Arm and Steve Turner of Mudhoney, and Chuck Treece) – 3:55
19. "Ain't Nothing to Do" (Stiv Bators, Cheetah Chrome) (with Mark Arm and Steve Turner of Mudhoney, and Chuck Treece) – 4:11

== Personnel ==
Pearl Jam

- Dave Abbruzzese – drums
- Jeff Ament – bass guitar
- Stone Gossard – guitars
- Mike McCready – guitars
- Eddie Vedder – vocals, guitars

Additional musicians

- Mark Arm – vocals on "Swallow My Pride" and "Ain't Nothing to Do"
- Chuck Treece – drums on "Swallow My Pride" and "Ain't Nothing to Do"
- Steve Turner – guitar on "Swallow My Pride" and "Ain't Nothing to Do"
