= Vitalogy =

Studio album by Pearl Jam
- Released: November 22, 1994
- Recorded: November 1993 – October 1994
- Venue: Fox Theatre (Atlanta)
- Studios: Bad Animals (Seattle); Southern Tracks (Atlanta); Doppler (Atlanta); Kingsway (New Orleans)
- Genres: Punk rock; grunge; art rock; hard rock
- Length: 55:09
- Label: Epic
- Producers: Brendan O'Brien; Pearl Jam

Pearl Jam chronology
Vs. (1993)	Vitalogy (1994)	No Code (1996)

Singles from Vitalogy
- 1. "Spin the Black Circle" / "Tremor Christ" Released: November 7, 1994; 2. "Not for You" Released: February 13, 1995; 3. "Immortality" Released: June 6, 1995

Vitalogy is the third studio album by American rock band Pearl Jam, released on November 22, 1994, through Epic Records. Pearl Jam wrote and recorded Vitalogy while touring in support of their previous album Vs. (1993). Vitalogy is generally considered to be a departure for the band, incorporating a more diverse range of influences than prior releases; the album features a number of experimental tracks, subdued ballads and punk-influenced hard rock songs.

The album was first released on vinyl, followed by a release on CD and cassette two weeks later on December 6, 1994. The LP sold 34,000 copies in its first week of release, and until Jack White's 2014 album Lazaretto it held the record for most vinyl sales in one week since SoundScan began tracking sales in 1991. Upon its CD release, Vitalogy became the second-fastest selling album in history, behind only the band's previous release Vs., selling 877,000 copies in its first week and quickly going multi-platinum. The album received critical acclaim and has been certified 5× platinum by the Recording Industry Association of America (RIAA) for sales of at least five million copies in the United States. The album was included on Rolling Stone's 2003 and 2012 "500 Greatest Albums of All Time" lists at number 485, but was dropped from the 2020 edition. It is Pearl Jam's second and last album to feature drummer Dave Abbruzzese, who was fired from the band before recording was finished. He was initially replaced by session drummers and later officially replaced by former Red Hot Chili Peppers' drummer Jack Irons, who completed the recording of the album.

== Recording ==
For the band's third album, Pearl Jam again worked with producer Brendan O'Brien. The band wrote many of the songs during soundchecks on its Vs. Tour, and the majority of the album's tracks were recorded during breaks on the tour. The first session took place late in 1993 in New Orleans, Louisiana, where the band recorded "Tremor Christ" and "Nothingman". The rest of the material was written and recorded in 1994 in sessions in Seattle, Washington and Atlanta, Georgia, with the band finishing the album at Bad Animals Studio in Seattle after the tour's completion. "Immortality" was written in April 1994 when the band was on tour in Atlanta. Sources state that most of the album was completed by early 1994, but it was not released until November due to either a forced delay by Epic or the band's battle with ticket vendor Ticketmaster.

Tensions within the band had dramatically increased by the time they were working on Vitalogy. Producer Brendan O'Brien said: "Vitalogy was a little strained. I'm being polite—there was some imploding going on." Bassist Jeff Ament said that "communication was at an all-time low". Drummer Dave Abbruzzese stated that the communication problems started once guitarist Stone Gossard stopped acting as the band's mediator. According to Gossard, Vitalogy was the first album for which lead vocalist Eddie Vedder made the final decisions. At the time, Gossard thought of quitting the band. Gossard said the band was having trouble collaborating, so most of the songs were developed out of jam sessions. He added that "80 percent of the songs were written 20 minutes before they were recorded." During the production of Vitalogy, lead guitarist Mike McCready went into rehabilitation to receive treatment for alcohol and cocaine abuse.

Months after finishing the initial recording sessions for Vitalogy, Abbruzzese was fired in August 1994 due to personality conflicts with other band members. Gossard said: "It was the nature of how the politics worked in our band: It was up to me to say, 'Hey, we tried, it's not working; time to move on.' On a superficial level, it was a political struggle: For whatever reason, his ability to communicate with Ed and Jeff was very stifled. I certainly don't think it was all Dave Abbruzzese's fault that it was stifled." Jack Irons, the original drummer for Red Hot Chili Peppers and Abbruzzese's successor, plays drums on "Hey Foxymophandlemama, That's Me". Gossard said: "Jack entered the band right at the end of making Vitalogy. Jack's a breath of fresh air, a family man. Everybody had a strong sense of friendship with him immediately. He was just there to play drums and help out."

== Music and lyrics ==
"Better Man"
A sample of "Better Man", from Vitalogy. Considered a "blatantly great pop song" by producer Brendan O'Brien, Pearl Jam was reluctant to record it and rejected it from the band's previous album Vs. due to its accessibility. The lyrics for the song, written by Vedder, are about an abusive relationship.

"Immortality"
A sample of "Immortality", the third single released from the album. The lyrics for the song have been claimed by some to be about Kurt Cobain; however, Vedder has denied this, suggesting instead that it is about "the pressures on someone who is on a parallel train".

Overall, Vitalogy has been identified as a punk rock album by both critics and members of Pearl Jam, departing the grunge sound of the band's previous work. Despite this, some publications have labeled the album as grunge.

In a 1995 interview, Guitar World writer Jeff Gilbert described Vitalogy as "strange" and "very eclectic". McCready agreed, saying: "There is some weird stuff on there." McCready attributed the album's sound to the group recording it on tour. During this period Vedder began to contribute in a large capacity as a guitarist. Gossard said: "Vitalogy is the first one where Ed plays guitar and he wrote three to four songs. I remember thinking, 'This is so different. Is anyone going to like this?'...It had a more punk feel to it. Simple songs recorded really quickly." The album has a notable lack of guitar solos compared with the band's first two albums. McCready said: "Vitalogy is not really a 'solo' album. I don't think the songs demanded solos; it was more of a rhythmic album."

Stephen Thomas Erlewine of AllMusic said that "thanks to its stripped-down, lean production, Vitalogy stands as Pearl Jam's most original and uncompromising album." He added that "in between the straight rock numbers and the searching slow songs, Pearl Jam contribute their strangest music—the mantrafunk of 'Aye Davanita', the sub-Tom Waits accordion romp of 'Bugs', and the chilling sonic collage 'Hey Foxymophandlemama, That's Me'." "Bugs" features Vedder playing an accordion that he found at a thrift shop, while "Hey Foxymophandlemama, That's Me" was created using looped recordings of real patients from a psychiatric hospital. Tim Coffman of WhatCulture considers Vitalogy to be a delve into art rock, commenting that the band "[threw] every outlandish idea into the mix."

Many of the songs on the album address the pressures of fame and dealing with the resulting loss of privacy. These include "Not for You", "Pry, To", "Corduroy", "Bugs", "Satan's Bed" and "Immortality". Vedder said: "I'm just totally vulnerable. I'm way too fucking soft for this whole business, this whole trip. I don't have any shell. There's a contradiction there, because that's probably why I can write songs that mean something to someone and express some of these things that other people can't necessarily express." The lyrics of "Not for You" express anger at the bureaucracy of the music industry and "how youth is being sold and exploited", while Vedder said "Corduroy" is about "one person's relationship with a million people." In "Pry, To" the phrase "P-r-i-v-a-c-y is priceless to me" is repeated. Many think that the lyrics of "Immortality" may be about Nirvana frontman Kurt Cobain's suicide, although Vedder has denied this, suggesting instead that it is about "the pressures on someone who is on a parallel train." The lyrics that appeared in the first live version of "Immortality" were altered before the song was released as part of the album. Vedder said, regarding "Nothingman", that "if you love someone and they love you, don't fuck up...'cause you are left with less than nothing." "Better Man" is a song about an abusive relationship. Vedder wrote the song when he was in high school and performed it with his previous band, Bad Radio. Considered a "blatantly great pop song" by producer Brendan O'Brien, Pearl Jam was reluctant to record it and had initially rejected it from Vs. due to its accessibility.

=== Outtakes ===
"Hard to Imagine", a song previously rejected from Vs., was also recorded during the Vitalogy sessions. This version found its way on to the soundtrack for the 1998 film Chicago Cab. "Hard to Imagine" is also included on the 2003 rarities compilation Lost Dogs, though that version is the one from the Vs. sessions. According to Gossard, "Hard to Imagine" was cut from Vitalogy because it did not fit with the other songs the band was writing at the time.

"Out of My Mind", which is featured as a B-side on the "Not for You" single, was premiered on the band's 1994 spring tour of the United States and was played twice. According to Vedder, the song was just a live improv.

== Title and packaging ==
The original title for the album was Life. The first single, "Spin the Black Circle", was released before the album was released, and on the back of the single it states: "From the Epic album Life".

The title Vitalogy, which literally means "the study of life", came from an early 20th-century medical book that Vedder found at a garage sale. This book was also the inspiration for the album's cover art and liner notes. Ament stated: "Ed brought in that book, and we said man that would make a great album cover." After explaining that, from Vs. onward, the band tried to take different approaches to packaging its records, he said: "We tried really hard, to make it like a book, kind of tipped it so it opened horizontally, which pissed off record stores: they had to put it in sideways." Packaging the album in this way cost an extra 50 cents per copy. When the band discovered that later versions of the medical book were still under copyright, they had to confer with their lawyers as they worked out which material they wanted to utilize in the final version of the artwork.

The booklet contains outdated discussions of health and well-being, as well as other notes, dealing with life and death reflections, which seem to be more personal, like a message typed on the "Immortality" page that seems to be referring to the loss of a loved one ("I waited all day. You waited all day...but you left before sunset...and I just wanted to tell you the moment was beautiful. Just wanted to dance to bad music...drive bad cars...watch bad TV...should have stayed for the sunset... if not for me."). It also includes some poems or original sayings that do not belong to the songs' lyrics, but can be interpreted as commentary on the songs or, again, as a reflection on how life should or should not be lived. An example is the poem typed on the "Aye Davanita" page. The song's subtitle is listed as "The song without words", as it is an instrumental track, but the page also displays a sort of poem about the wasted life of a young girl. Another episode of "intruder words" is on the "Not for You" page. After the second refrain, instead of the actual lyrics, the typed words give a hint about the Sisyphus myth ("Call me Sisyphus love. Yeh, I move the rock. I just don't want to talk about moving the rock. Get pictures taken of me while moving the rock. Anything that distracts me from moving the rock."). The lyrics to "Whipping" are written on a copy of a petition to Bill Clinton against "pro-life" killings of abortion doctors. An X-ray of Vedder's teeth was pictured instead of lyrics on the page for "Corduroy".

== Release and reception ==
Professional ratings
Review scores
Source	Rating
AllMusic	4.5/5 stars
Chicago Sun-Times	3/4 stars
Entertainment Weekly	B+
Los Angeles Times	4/4 stars
Pitchfork	8.3/10
Q	4/5 stars
Rolling Stone	4/5 stars
The Rolling Stone Album Guide	4.5/5 stars
USA Today	3.5/4 stars
The Village Voice	A−

Vitalogy was released first on vinyl on November 22, 1994, two weeks before its CD and cassette release, and debuted at number 55 on the Billboard 200 album chart. The LP sold 34,000 copies in its first week of release, and, until Jack White's Lazaretto in 2014, it held the record for most vinyl sales in one week on Soundscan. It was also the first album to chart on the Billboard 200 due to vinyl sales alone since the CD became the dominant format for album sales. When Vitalogy was released on CD and cassette on December 6, 1994, it went to number one on the Billboard 200 album chart, selling more than 877,000 copies in its first week. It was the second-fastest selling album in history, behind only the band's previous release Vs. Vitalogy has been certified five times platinum by the Recording Industry Association of America (RIAA), and, as of July 2013, has sold 6.9 million copies in the United States, according to Nielsen SoundScan. In July 2013, Rolling Stone ranked Vitalogy second in a reader's poll of Pearl Jam's best albums.

Rolling Stone staff writer Al Weisel gave Vitalogy a positive four out of five stars, describing the album as "a wildly uneven and difficult record, sometimes maddening, sometimes ridiculous, often powerful." While Weisel praised several songs, saying that " Vitalogy has a number of gripping songs that match the soaring anthems of Ten, the extended grooves of Vs. or the poetry of either record", he somewhat criticized some of the more experimental songs as "throwaways and strange experiments that don't always work". Jon Pareles of The New York Times praised the album's diversity compared to the band's previous records, commenting that the band incorporated "fast but brutal punk, fuzz-toned psychedelia and judicious folk-rock, all of it sounding more spontaneous than before." He felt the band continued to be "unremittingly glum", and described the majority of the songs as "tortured first-person proclamations", commenting that "Vedder sounds more alone than ever." Time reviewer Christopher John Farley singled out "Bugs" as one of the album's "share of stinkers", but added "that's one admirably experimental failure on a largely successful album." Despite writing negatively of the album's "shapeless high-energy riff-rockers", Newsday staff writer Ira Robbins lauded Vitalogy's sound and called it a "compelling triumph of surface over substance". In a mixed review of the album, Mark Jenkins of The Washington Post perceived a lack of subject matter or lyrical substance as Vitalogy's weakness.

Q magazine gave the album four out of five stars, stating: "It speaks volumes for Pearl Jam's continuing creative acumen that they can respond so confidently to a new punk scene that has sprung up." Robert Christgau of The Village Voice gave the album an A− rating, writing that "Three or four of these songs are faster and riffier than anything else in P. Jam's book, token experiments like "Bugs" are genuinely weird, and in an era of compulsory irony [Vedder's] sincerity is something like a relief—a Kurtlike relief at that." David Browne of Entertainment Weekly gave the album a B+, saying that "Vitalogy marks the first time it's possible to respect the band's music as much as its stance", but "despite its musical advances, Vitalogy leaves an odd, unsettling aftertaste. You walk away from it energized, but wondering what price Eddie Vedder, and Pearl Jam, will ultimately pay for it." Chicago Sun-Times writer Jim DeRogatis gave that album three out of four stars and commended Pearl Jam for their earnest songwriting. However, DeRogatis also wrote that the album "leaves you wishing that they'd just lighten up". USA Today's Edna Gundersen gave Vitalogy three and a half out of four stars and stated that it "delivers the band's most compelling, inventive and confident music to date", while calling it "the rebel yell of a band that is maturing without mellowing". Los Angeles Times critic Robert Hilburn gave Vitalogy four out of four stars and viewed its music as an improvement over Pearl Jam's previous work, writing: "This isn't just the best Pearl Jam album but a better album than the band once even seemed capable of making". AllMusic staff writer Stephen Thomas Erlewine gave the album four and a half out of five stars, saying: "Pearl Jam are at their best when they're fighting, whether it's Ticketmaster, fame, or their own personal demons." According to The New Rolling Stone Album Guide (2004): "By Vitalogy PJ hit their apex … the band's creative zenith, finding them doing a Led Zeppelin III on acoustic tracks like 'Corduroy' and turning in a Tom Waits-like weird attack on 'Bugs'."

Three singles were released from Vitalogy. The lead single, "Spin the Black Circle" (backed with B-side "Tremor Christ", also from the album), was the band's first to enter the Billboard Hot 100, reaching number 18. At the 1996 Grammy Awards, "Spin the Black Circle" won the band its first Grammy Award, receiving the award for Best Hard Rock Performance. Neither of the album's other commercially released singles, "Not for You" and "Immortality", charted on the Hot 100, but both placed on the Album Rock and Modern Rock charts. Album tracks "Better Man" and "Corduroy" also charted. "Better Man" was the most successful song from Vitalogy on the rock charts, spending a total of eight weeks at number one on the Album Rock chart and reaching number two on the Modern Rock chart. At the 1996 Grammy Awards, Vitalogy received nominations for Album of the Year and Best Rock Album. In 2003, the album was ranked number 492 on Rolling Stone magazine's list of the 500 greatest albums of all time. The magazine listed the album at number 485 on its revised list in 2012, saying it showed the band's "mastery of rock's past and future". In May 2014, Loudwire placed Vitalogy at number ten on its "10 Best Hard Rock Albums of 1994" list. In July 2014, Guitar World placed the album on its "Superunknown: 50 Iconic Albums That Defined 1994" list.

In 2011, Pearl Jam released a remastered Vitalogy, along with Vs., in three formats: an Expanded Version, a three-CD Deluxe Edition, and a Limited Edition Collector's Boxed Set. The Expanded Version features three bonus tracks: the previously unreleased guitar/organ-only mix of "Better Man"; a previously unreleased alternate take of "Corduroy" from the Vitalogy sessions (recorded by Brendan O'Brien); and a previously unreleased demo version of "Nothingman", taken from the original DAT (recorded at John and Stu's in Seattle on October 14, 1993, featuring Richard Stuverud on drums). The three-CD Deluxe Edition features both the Legacy Versions of Vitalogy and Vs. with their bonus tracks and a copy of Live at the Orpheum Theater, Boston, April 12, 1994.

== Tour ==
Pearl Jam promoted the album with tours in Asia, Oceania, and the United States in 1995. The band was joined by new drummer Jack Irons. The short tour of the United States focused on the Midwest and the West Coast. The band continued its boycott against Ticketmaster during its tour of the United States, refusing to play in Ticketmaster's venue areas, but was surprised that virtually no other bands joined it in refusing to play at Ticketmaster venues. The band chose to use alternate ticketing companies for the shows.

The tour of the United States faced various troubles. Ament said the band and its crew had to "[build] shows from the ground up, a venue everywhere we went". In June 1995, the band was scheduled to play at San Francisco, California's Golden Gate Park in front of 50,000 people. Before the concert, Vedder was forced to stay at a hospital after suffering from the effects of food poisoning. He left the hospital to play the show, but he was not able to finish and ended up performing just seven out of 21 songs with the band. Neil Young filled in for Vedder for the rest of the show that day. Vedder said: "That whole [Golden Gate Park] thing was a blur based on some bad food. It was really, really bad. Looking back at it, it doesn't seem as intense as it was, but it was horrible. I just felt not human and looking back I should have got through that show somehow, and I think the fact that Neil [Young] was there made me feel like I could get off the hook in some way and I did go out for a few songs." Because of Vedder's health, the band was forced to cancel the remaining dates of its tour of the United States. Some dates were later reinstated, while the rest were rescheduled for the fall. About canceling the dates, Vedder said: "I think we all agreed that it had gotten insane, that it was no longer about the music." Ament later said: "We were so hardheaded about the 1995 tour. Had to prove we could tour on our own, and it pretty much killed us, killed our career."

== Track listing ==
All lyrics are written by Eddie Vedder; all music is composed by Pearl Jam (Dave Abbruzzese, Jeff Ament, Stone Gossard, Mike McCready, Vedder) except as noted.

Division one
No.	Title	Music	Length
1.	"Last Exit"		2:54
2.	"Spin the Black Circle"		2:48
3.	"Not for You"		5:52
4.	"Tremor Christ"		4:12
5.	"Nothingman"	Ament	4:35
6.	"Whipping"		2:34

Division two
No.	Title	Music	Length
7.	"Pry, To"		1:03
8.	"Corduroy"		4:37
9.	"Bugs"		2:44
10.	"Satan's Bed"	Gossard	3:30
11.	"Better Man"	Vedder	4:28
12.	"Aye Davanita"		2:57
13.	"Immortality"		5:28
14.	"Hey Foxymophandlemama, That's Me" a.k.a. "Stupid Mop"	Ament, Gossard, Jack Irons, McCready, Vedder	7:28
Total length:			55:09

Reissue bonus tracks
No.	Title	Music	Length
15.	"Better Man" (guitar and organ only mix)	Vedder	3:55
16.	"Corduroy" (alternate take)		4:44
17.	"Nothingman" (1993 demo featuring Richard Stuverud on drums)	Ament	4:36

== Personnel ==
Pearl Jam

- Eddie Vedder – vocals, guitar, accordion on "Bugs"; credited as "e.v." for book concept, theory of Vitalogy, typist
- Jeff Ament – bass guitar, standup bass, backing vocals, black-and-white photography
- Stone Gossard – guitar, Mellotron, backing vocals
- Mike McCready – guitar, slide guitar, backing vocals
- Dave Abbruzzese – drums (except on "Hey Foxymophandlemama, That's Me")

Additional musicians and production

- Jack Irons – drums on "Hey Foxymophandlemama, That's Me"
- Barry Ament – layout
- John Burton, Caram Costanzo, Karl Heilbron, Adam Kasper, Kevin Scott, Trina Shoemaker – assistance
- Nick DiDia – engineering
- Brett Eliason – recording/mixing on "Hey Foxymophandlemama, That's Me"
- Lance Mercer – 8-Baby photo
- Brendan O'Brien – production, recording, pump organ, Hammond organ, Crumar bass pedals, piano
- Pearl Jam – production
- Bob Ludwig – mastering
- Joel Zimmerman – art direction

== Charts ==
=== Weekly charts ===
Weekly chart performance for Vitalogy
Chart (1994)	Peak position
Australian Albums (ARIA)	1
Austrian Albums (Ö3 Austria)	7
Danish Albums (Hitlisten)	4
Dutch Albums (Album Top 100)	7
Finnish Albums (Suomen virallinen lista)	3
French Albums (SNEP)	22
German Albums (Offizielle Top 100)	8
Irish Albums (IRMA)	1
Japanese Albums (Oricon)	28
New Zealand (RMNZ)	1
Norwegian Albums (VG-lista)	7
Portuguese Albums (AFP)	4
Scottish Albums (Official Charts)	5
Spanish Albums (PROMUSICAE)	11
Swedish Albums (Sverigetopplistan)	1
Swiss Albums (Schweizer Hitparade)	17
UK Albums (OCC)	4
US Billboard 200	1

1995 weekly chart performance for Vitalogy
Chart (1995)	Peak position
Canadian Albums (RPM)	2

=== Year-end charts ===
1994 year-end chart performance for Vitalogy
Chart (1994)	Position
Australian Albums (ARIA)	12
Dutch Albums (Album Top 100)	64
UK Albums (OCC)	73

1995 year-end chart performance for Vitalogy
Chart (1995)	Position
Australian Albums (ARIA)	31
German Albums (Offizielle Top 100)	67
New Zealand Albums (RMNZ)	20
US Billboard 200	6

=== Decade-end charts ===
Decade-end chart performance for Vitalogy
Chart (1990–1999)	Position
US Billboard 200	76

== Certifications ==
Certifications for Vitalogy
Region	Certification	Certified units/sales
Australia (ARIA)	4× Platinum	280,000^{^}
Canada (Music Canada)	5× Platinum	500,000^{^}
Netherlands (NVPI)	Gold	50,000^{^}
New Zealand (RMNZ)	Platinum	15,000^{^}
Poland (ZPAV)	Gold	50,000^{*}
Spain (Promusicae)	Gold	50,000^{^}
United Kingdom (BPI)	Gold	100,000^{^}
United States (RIAA)	5× Platinum	5,000,000^{^}
^{*} Sales figures based on certification alone.^{^} Shipments figures based on certification alone.
