= Nothingman =

Song by Pearl Jam

Song by Pearl Jam

from the album Vitalogy
- Released: November 22, 1994
- Recorded: November 1993, February 1994 (vocals)
- Studio: Kingsway Studio, New Orleans, Louisiana; Bad Animals, Seattle, Washington (vocals)
- Genre: Grunge, folk rock
- Length: 4:35
- Label: Epic
- Composer(s): Jeff Ament
- Lyricist(s): Eddie Vedder
- Producer(s): Brendan O'Brien, Pearl Jam

"Nothingman" is a song by the American rock band Pearl Jam. Featuring lyrics written by vocalist Eddie Vedder and music by bassist Jeff Ament, "Nothingman" is the fifth track on the band's third studio album, Vitalogy (1994). The song was included on Pearl Jam's 2004 greatest hits album, Rearviewmirror (Greatest Hits 1991–2003).

== Origin and recording ==
Guitarist Stone Gossard said "Tremor Christ" and "Nothingman", which Jeff wrote, were recorded a day apart. They were very spontaneous, but with a simple yet indescribably beautiful vibe to them."

In another interview, Gossard elaborated further:

Jeff Ament wrote it, Dave Abbruzzese plays great drums on it. Jeff had the chord changes; him and Ed maybe worked it out before. Real Jeff Ament style, his approach to strumming. It has his character trademarks but at the same time really super simple, Ed connects so well with it that anyone who hears it will wanna sing along.

Vedder on the song:

"Nothingman" was written in an hour, and so I like listening to that 'cause it just happened and somehow captured a mood there, at least for me in the vocal. Any time I can nail down a song, a thought, in a half hour, that feels really good.

== Lyrics ==
When asked about "Nothingman" in an interview, Vedder stated, "The idea is about if you love someone and they love you, don't fuck up...'cause you are left with less than nothing." Discussing his attitude toward his first wife, Vedder commented, "But I just know that without her, I'd be a kite without a string, a nothing man."

== Reception ==
In Canada, "Nothingman" charted on the Alternative Top 30 chart where it peaked at number 19.

"Nothingman" was featured in the Californication episode "In Utero" in 2008. The song was also featured in the Cold Case episode "Into the Blue" in 2009.

== Live performances ==
"Nothingman" was first performed live at the band's March 20, 1994 concert in Ann Arbor, Michigan at Crisler Arena. The song is also a part of the so-called "Man" trio ("Better Man", "Nothingman", "Leatherman") played occasionally at concerts. There is no connection between the three songs beyond the word "man" being in each of their titles. Live performances of "Nothingman" can be found on the compilation album The Bridge School Concerts, Vol. 1, the live album Live on Two Legs, and various official bootlegs. A performance of the song is also included on the DVD Touring Band 2000. The version of the song on The Bridge School Concerts, Vol. 1 is an acoustic performance recorded live at the Bridge School Benefit.

Nothingman is usually performed at a slightly, though perceptibly, faster tempo in concert compared to the studio version, as is Pearl Jam tradition with many live songs.

== Chart positions ==
Chart (1995)	Position
Canadian Alternative Top 30	19
