= Paramount Theatre (Denver) =

- U.S. National Register of Historic Places
- Colorado State Register of Historic Properties
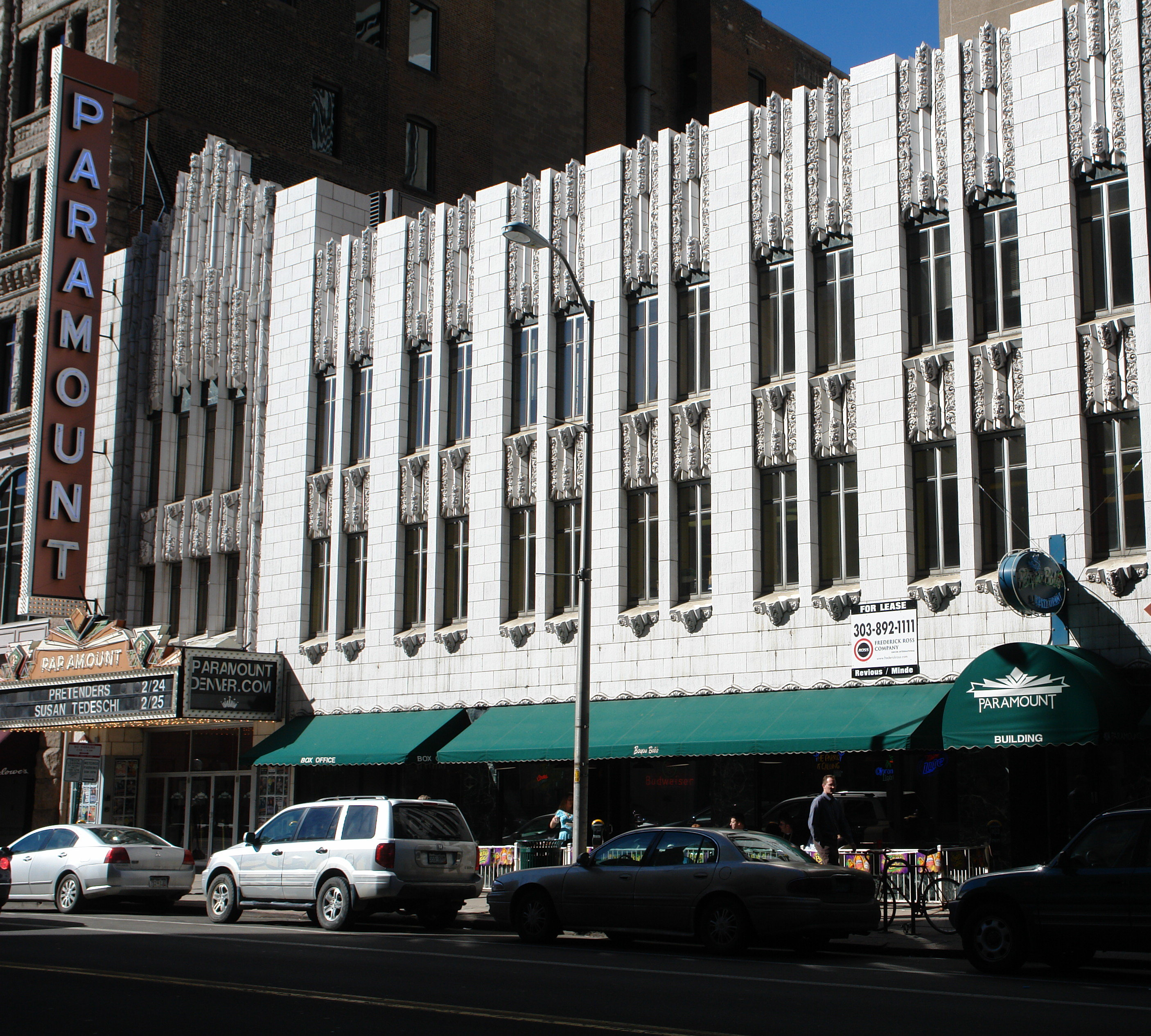
- Location: 1621 Glenarm Place; Denver, Colorado
- Coordinates: 39°44′39.91″N 104°59′24.75″W
- Built: 1930
- Architect: Temple H. Buell
- Architectural style: Art Deco
- NRHP reference No.: 80000893
- CSRHP No.: 5DV.190
- Added to NRHP: November 21, 1980

The Paramount Theatre is a concert venue in Denver, Colorado, located at 1621 Glenarm Place, adjacent to Denver's famous 16th Street Mall. The venue has a seating capacity of 1,870 but is a popular destination for large acts looking for a smaller concert setting. With spelling as Paramount Theater, the building was listed on the National Register of Historic Places in 1980.

== History ==
The Paramount opened in 1930 as a movie theatre, part of the Paramount-Publix Theatre Circuit, the exhibition arm of Paramount Pictures. The theatre itself was designed by the Chicago architectural firm of Rapp and Rapp, with decorations by designer Vincent Mondo, murals by Louis Grell of Chicago. The original main entry to the theatre was at 519 16th Street, where an entrance lobby was cut through an existing commercial and office building.

The three-story office and commercial building featuring what was then the theatre's secondary entrance on Glenarm Place, now the main entrance, was designed by the local architect Temple H. Buell. Buell's design is a modernized, art deco interpretation of the Gothic style, executed largely in cast concrete and white terra cotta.

For several decades the Paramount enjoyed success as one of the premier movie houses in the Rocky Mountain region. Then, like other large movie theatres, its patronage declined as population and commerce dispersed into new suburban areas. By 1978, it was the last movie palace left in Denver, and started hosting opera with a production of Madama Butterfly in October 1978 by the Denver Opera Company. The venue has survived and evolved, and now plays host to numerous concert and performance acts. The theatre was placed on the National Register of Historic Places in 1980, and the city of Denver recognized it as a historic landmark in 1988. Eight years later, Sinbad performed his HBO comedy special "Son of a Preacher Man" here.

In 2002 the Paramount and the building next door was purchased by what is now Kroenke Sports & Entertainment.

== Wurlitzer organ ==
The Paramount also hosts one of two remaining twin-console Wurlitzer theatre organs in the United States. (The other one is located in New York City, at Radio City Music Hall.) With four manuals and twenty ranks, and over 1600 pipes, the Paramount's instrument is one of the largest ever installed in the Rocky Mountain region. It is opus 2122 of the Publix#1 style Wurlitzer, a type designed by the theatre organist Jesse Crawford. It was installed in the theatre on July 23, 1930. The Wurlitzer organ is featured on many of Denver's cultural tours. At some point soon after its original installation, it was determined that it required an English Post Horn more than the original Vox Humana in the Solo Chamber, so the Vox was removed to storage in the building and a Post Horn purchased and installed on the old Vox Humana chest. Recently, Bill Brown, the original owner of the Phoenix Organ Stop pizza parlors, learned of the “homeless” Vox pipes at the Denver Paramount, and donated an additional pipe chest to Rocky Mountain chapter of the American Theatre Organ Society, who maintain the instrument, to be used for the “silent” Vox rank. Installation is now complete (as of 2012), and the second Vox is once again playing from its original stop tabs on the console. Consequently, the organ now contains twenty-one ranks. The second, slave console is actually a Wurlitzer three-manual shell, thus being slightly smaller than the main console.
