= Glorified G =

Song by Pearl Jam

from the album Vs.
- Released: October 19, 1993
- Recorded: March–May 1993
- Studio: The Site, Nicasio, California
- Genre: Alternative rock
- Length: 3:26
- Label: Epic
- Composers: Dave Abbruzzese; Jeff Ament; Stone Gossard; Mike McCready; Eddie Vedder
- Lyricist: Eddie Vedder
- Producers: Brendan O'Brien; Pearl Jam

"Glorified G" is a song by the American rock band Pearl Jam. The song is the fourth track on the band's second studio album, Vs. (1993). The song features lyrics written by vocalist Eddie Vedder and music written by the band's members. Despite the lack of a commercial single release, the song managed to reach number 39 on the Billboard Mainstream Rock Tracks chart.

== Origin and recording ==
Bassist Jeff Ament plays upright bass on "Glorified G". Guitarist Stone Gossard on the song:

"Glorified G" was one that went through a series of changes, and barely held together the whole time. We all knew there were melodies and riffs in it we liked. But even listening to the song right up to the mixing stage I was going, "Does this work at all?!" Here was Mike playing a very up, country guitar line while I'm playing this choppy down riff on the opposite end of the groove spectrum. Meanwhile, Jeff's got this totally other bass line going that's not really steady, and he's going off in a melodic direction, too. So there's not really anybody holding it down, and Dave's got to decide either to play it more the country way or play it the funky way. There was this precarious balance, and then suddenly the bridge comes in from out of the blue, which, if Eddie doesn't sing it just right, sounds sort of foreign. Finally, it never goes back to the chorus at the end, it turns into something else.

Guitarist Mike McCready on the song:

I wrote part of that one. I had this Gretsch Country Gentleman and I started jamming on this little thing in D (sings riff); the riff just came out of that. Stone came up with his weird part. There are all these strange, disjointed parts that kind of turned into a song. Stone's doing something weird, Jeff's doing something weird and offbeat, but for some reason it works, I really don't know why.

== Composition ==
The music for "Glorified G" is made up of a combination of a country-influenced guitar riff written by McCready and a discordant guitar riff written by Gossard. Gossard said, "It’s trying to be country and funky at the same time, which is really bizarre."

== Lyrics ==
"Glorified G" is an anti-gun song with lyrics mocking gun enthusiasts. The song was inspired by an incident in which drummer Dave Abbruzzese told the band he had just bought two guns, which sparked a conversation about guns within the band. Vocalist Eddie Vedder said about "Glorified G":

I didn't actually write that song... I was at a band rehearsal and just started writing down these things the guys were talking about. The band were having this conversation and I just took down the dialogue. One of the band members had just bought a gun. It was the drummer, actually. Ask him about it.

Abbruzzese about "Glorified G":

I told our manager that I just bought a coupla guns and he told Jeff, and at rehearsal Jeff kinda blurted it out. And Eddie went, 'Whaaaat, you bought a GUN?' And I said, 'In fact, I bought two,' which ended up as the opening line of the song. I think it's fair to say Eddie was pretty outraged.

== Reception ==
Without being released as a single, "Glorified G" peaked at number 39 on the Billboard Mainstream Rock Tracks chart in 1994.

== Live performances ==
"Glorified G" was first performed live at the band's June 16, 1993 concert in Missoula, Montana at the University of Montana-Missoula's University Theatre. The song was played live from its debut in 1993 up until 1996 when it was dropped from set lists. After the band's November 17, 1996 concert in Budapest, Hungary at the Sports Hall, the song was not performed live for a period of over six years. “Glorified G" finally made a return appearance at the band's April 11, 2003 concert in West Palm Beach, Florida at the Sound Advice Amphitheatre. The song has since returned to Pearl Jam set lists. Live performances of "Glorified G" can be found on the "Dissident"/Live in Atlanta box set and various official bootlegs.

== Chart positions ==
Chart (1994)	Position
US Mainstream Rock Tracks	39
