= Bad Radio =

American funk rock band

- Origin: San Diego, California, U.S.
- Genres: Alternative rock, funk rock
- Years active: 1986–1991
- Past members: Dave George; Joey Ponchetti; Dave Silva; Keith Wood; Petey Bates; Eddie Vedder; Dawn Richardson

Bad Radio was a four-piece, American funk rock band that formed in San Diego, California, in 1986. The band is most notable for having featured future Pearl Jam vocalist Eddie Vedder as its lead singer from 1988 to 1990. The band was a popular live band in Southern California, but never released a record on a label.

== History ==
Bad Radio was formed in 1986 by vocalist Keith Wood, guitarist Dave George, bassist Dave Silva, and drummer Joey Ponchetti. The music of the original incarnation of the band was influenced by Duran Duran. Between 1988 and 1990, future Pearl Jam lead singer Eddie Vedder was the vocalist. After Vedder joined Bad Radio, the band moved on to a more alternative rock sound influenced by the Red Hot Chili Peppers. During his time with the band he premiered the song "Better Man", which would later be recorded with Pearl Jam.

In 1989, the band released a 4-song demo tape which has been dubbed the Tower Records Demo due to it being sold locally in San Diego Tower Records stores for about a year. Later that year the band released another demo tape titled What the Funk. The demo tape was funded after winning a battle of the bands contest held by San Diego radio station 91X. The demo tape included recordings of songs titled, "I'm Alive", "Homeless", "What the Funk", and "Believe You Me".

Vedder's last show with the band was February 11, 1990. After Vedder left, original band vocalist Keith Wood replaced him, and the band relocated to Hollywood, where the band was joined by a new drummer, Dawn Richardson. Richardson would later join the 4 Non Blondes.

== Band members ==
- Dave George – guitar (1986–1991)
- Joey Ponchetti – drums (1986–1990)
- Dave Silva – bass (1986–1991)
- Keith Wood – vocals (1986–1988, 1990-1991)
- Petey Bates - Keyboards (1986-1988)
- Eddie Vedder – vocals (1988–1990)
- Dawn Richardson – drums (1990-1991)

== See also ==
- List of alternative rock artists
