= Tremor Christ =

Song by Pearl Jam

from the album Vitalogy
- Released: November 22, 1994
- Recorded: November 1993 at Kingsway Studio, New Orleans, Louisiana
- Genre: Punk rock, grunge
- Length: 4:12
- Label: Epic
- Composers: Dave Abbruzzese; Jeff Ament; Stone Gossard; Mike McCready; Eddie Vedder
- Lyricist: Eddie Vedder
- Producers: Brendan O'Brien, Pearl Jam

"Tremor Christ" is a song by the American rock band Pearl Jam. The song is the fourth track on the band's third studio album, Vitalogy (1994). Although credited to all members of Pearl Jam, it features lyrics written by vocalist Eddie Vedder and music primarily written by guitarist Mike McCready and bass player Jeff Ament. Besides Vitalogy, the song was also featured as the B-side of the single, "Spin the Black Circle". The song managed to reach number 16 on both the Mainstream Rock and Modern Rock Billboard charts.

== Origin and recording ==
"Tremor Christ" was recorded in New Orleans, Louisiana. Vocalist Eddie Vedder on the song:

We recorded "Tremor Christ" in a very short period, one night in New Orleans, and I remember what that night was like. I can see how the lights were turned down low. I can see the room. And so I like listening to that.

Guitarist Stone Gossard on the song:

"Tremor Christ" seemed to write itself. It was just a riff-and-a-half, basically. On a muggy, beautiful New Orleans afternoon we came into a very cool studio and it poured out. That and "Nothingman", which Jeff wrote, were recorded a day apart. They were very spontaneous, but with a simple yet indescribably beautiful vibe to them.

Guitarist Mike McCready on the song:

I wrote part of that one. It's kind of an odd, marching Beatles tune. It's just a strange song. It was written in New Orleans. The groove reconciles itself after you get into it.

== Composition ==
"Tremor Christ" features a marching rhythm similar to that of many songs by the Beatles. Jon Pareles of The New York Times compared the song to "I Am the Walrus" from the 1967 album Magical Mystery Tour.

== Reception ==
Despite not being released as a single, "Tremor Christ" managed to reach number 16 on both the Mainstream Rock and Modern Rock Billboard charts in 1994. In Canada, the song reached number 67 on the Canadian Singles Chart. "Tremor Christ" was omitted from the band's greatest hits album, while tracks such as "Nothingman" (which never charted but is arguably better known), were included. "Tremor Christ" has since largely disappeared from rock radio.

== Live performances ==
"Tremor Christ" was first performed live at the band's November 30, 1993 concert in Las Vegas, Nevada at the Aladdin Theatre for the Performing Arts. In recent years, "Tremor Christ" has rarely been included in the band's set lists. Live performances of "Tremor Christ" can be found on various official bootlegs.

== Chart positions ==
Chart (1994)	Position
US Billboard Hot 100 Airplay	69
US Mainstream Rock Tracks	16
US Modern Rock Tracks	16
Chart (1995)	Position
Canadian RPM Singles Chart	67
