= Spin the Black Circle =

1994 single by Pearl Jam

Single by Pearl Jam

from the album Vitalogy
- B-side: "Tremor Christ"
- Released: November 7, 1994
- Studio: Bad Animals (Seattle, Washington)
- Genre: Hardcore punk
- Length: 2:48
- Label: Epic
- Composers: Dave Abbruzzese; Jeff Ament; Stone Gossard; Mike McCready; Eddie Vedder
- Lyricist: Eddie Vedder
- Producers: Brendan O'Brien, Pearl Jam

Pearl Jam singles chronology
"Dissident" (1994)	"Spin the Black Circle" (1994)	"Not for You" (1995)

"Spin the Black Circle" is a song by American rock band Pearl Jam, released on November 7, 1994, as the first single from the band's third studio album, Vitalogy (1994). Although credited to all members of Pearl Jam, it features lyrics written by vocalist Eddie Vedder and music primarily written by guitarist Stone Gossard. The song peaked at number 11 on the Billboard Modern Rock Tracks chart and at number 18 on the Billboard Hot 100. It additionally charted at number 10 in the UK Singles Chart, giving them their only top-10 hit in that country. The song was later included on Pearl Jam's 2004 greatest-hits album, rearviewmirror (Greatest Hits 1991–2003).

== Origin and recording ==
Guitarist Stone Gossard originally wrote the guitar riff for "Spin the Black Circle" much slower, but vocalist Eddie Vedder asked him to speed it up. Vedder on the song:

I remember wanting everything to be faster...Stone gave me a tape with this riff [hums it at slow speed]. I had a speed control on my machine. I speeded it up, came back and said, "Can we do it this way?"

Guitarist Mike McCready on the song:

That's me trying to do Johnny Thunders leads. I actually overdubbed those leads, but when I do it live, that riff is so hectic and frantic, I have to be warmed up or it sounds really shitty.

Bassist Jeff Ament has admitted that he was unhappy at the time with the punk rock direction that the song took. He said that "when we wrote 'Spin the Black Circle'...I was like, 'Ugh!'. I can play the entire Dead Kennedys back catalog! I didn't really want to make music like that at that time."

== Composition ==
"Spin the Black Circle" begins with one guitar playing fast power chords, and then the second guitar kicks in and Vedder begins singing aggressively through the rest of the song.

== Lyrics ==
According to Vedder, "Spin the Black Circle" is about his and the band's love for vinyl records. At the band's July 1, 2003, show in Bristow, Virginia at the Nissan Pavilion, Vedder proclaimed "This song is about old records, old records, anyone remember old records?" The lyrics play on the similarities between drug addiction and addiction to records and music, as many of the lyrics may be interpreted either way. It is unclear to what extent this is intended to be a serious comparison of different types of addiction and to what extent it is just intended to make the lyrics interesting. Jon Pareles of The New York Times referred to "Spin the Black Circle" as "one of the few songs from Seattle in which a needle has nothing to do with heroin."

== Release and chart performance ==
"Spin the Black Circle" was released on November 7, 1994, with the B-side "Tremor Christ". The single peaked at number 18 on the Billboard Hot 100, number 16 on the Billboard Album Rock Tracks chart, and number 11 on the Billboard Modern Rock Tracks chart. "Spin the Black Circle" was the band's first single to enter the Billboard Hot 100. Because of the Hot 100's tracking methods, this high position reflects the single's sales preceding the album's delayed release on compact disc.

Outside the United States, "Spin the Black Circle" reached the top 10 in Australia, Denmark, Finland, Ireland, New Zealand, Norway, and the United Kingdom. It also reached the top 20 in Sweden, the top 30 in the Netherlands, and charted at number 92 in Germany. The song remains the band's highest-charting single in the United Kingdom and their only top-10 hit there. It is also their highest-charting single in New Zealand, along with "Go" (1993).

== Critical reception ==
Al Weisel of Rolling Stone called the song a "revvedup thrash tribute to vinyl." David Browne of Entertainment Weekly said that it sounds "a little flabby, like dinosaur rockers trying to prove they're into Green Day." At the 1996 Grammy Awards, "Spin the Black Circle" received the award for Best Hard Rock Performance; it was the first Grammy Award Pearl Jam had ever won. During the band's acceptance speech, Vedder famously said, "I don't know what this means. I don't think it means anything. [...] Thanks, I guess."

== Live performances ==
"Spin the Black Circle" was first performed live at the band's March 6, 1994, concert in Denver, Colorado at the Paramount Theatre. Live performances of "Spin the Black Circle" can be found on various official bootlegs and the Live at the Gorge 05/06 box set. A performance of the song is also included on the DVD Live at the Garden.

== Charts ==
=== Weekly charts ===
Chart (1994)	Peak position
Australia (ARIA)	3
Belgium (Ultratop 50 Flanders)	22
Denmark (IFPI)	10
Europe (Eurochart Hot 100)	16
Finland (Suomen virallinen lista)	9
Germany (GfK)	92
Ireland (IRMA)	6
Netherlands (Dutch Top 40)	22
Netherlands (Single Top 100)	21
New Zealand (Recorded Music NZ)	2
Norway (VG-lista)	5
Scottish Singles Sales (Official Charts)	11
Sweden (Sverigetopplistan)	16
UK Singles (Official Charts)	10
UK Rock & Metal (Official Charts)	8
US Billboard Hot 100 with "Tremor Christ"	18
US Alternative Airplay (Billboard)	11
US Mainstream Rock Airplay (Billboard)	16
US Cash Box Top 100	64

=== Year-end charts ===
Chart (1994)	Position
Australia (ARIA)	96

== Release history ==
Region	Date	Format(s)	Label(s)	Ref.
Australia	November 7, 1994	CD; cassette	Epic	
United States	November 8, 1994	Vinyl; CD	Epic	
United Kingdom	November 14, 1994	7-inch vinyl; CD; cassette	Epic	
