= Not for You =

1995 single by Pearl Jam

Single by Pearl Jam

from the album Vitalogy
- B-side: "Out of My Mind" (live)
- Released: February 13, 1995
- Studio: Bad Animals (Seattle, Washington)
- Genre: Punk rock; grunge
- Length: 5:52
- Label: Epic
- Composers: Dave Abbruzzese; Jeff Ament; Stone Gossard; Mike McCready; Eddie Vedder
- Lyricist: Eddie Vedder
- Producers: Brendan O'Brien, Pearl Jam

Pearl Jam singles chronology
"Spin the Black Circle" (1994)	"Not for You" (1995)	"Immortality" (1995)

Audio
- "Not for You" on YouTube

"Not for You" is a song by the American rock band Pearl Jam, released in February 1995 as the second single from the band's third studio album, Vitalogy (1994). Although credited to all members of Pearl Jam, it was primarily written by vocalist Eddie Vedder. The song peaked at number 12 on the US Billboard Album Rock Tracks chart and became the band's fourth top-10 single in New Zealand. It was later included on Pearl Jam's 2004 greatest hits album, rearviewmirror (Greatest Hits 1991–2003).

== Origin and recording ==
Guitarist Mike McCready on "Not for You":

Tom Petty sent me this amazing 12-string Rickenbacker, and "Not for You" was the first time I used it. It was like a Christmas present. One day it just showed up at my door. I called him up and thanked him. But it's a cool song—an Eddie song.

== Lyrics ==
Vocalist Eddie Vedder about "Not for You":

I believe...that there is something sacred about youth, and the song is about how youth is being sold and exploited. I think I felt like I had become part of that too. Maybe that's why sometimes I have a hard time with the TV end of music and much of the media and the magazines. When I pick up a magazine, I just count how many pages of ads before the first article starts. You go one, two...up to fifteen to twenty or more. And then in the back you have phone sex ads. So I've pretty much had it. I don't want to be the traveling medicine show where we go out and do the song and dance and someone else drops the back of the wagon and starts selling crap. I don't want our music to sell anything—or anyone else use it. There are a lot of middlemen, somewhere between the band and the audience. I know you need some people to help facilitate things for the live show, and I'm not saying that I don't appreciate these people but...In the last ten or fifteen years, there have been a lot of changes in music, and somehow the percentages being charged [by the concert industry] got out of hand. We also don't want to be part of all the marketing tools or whatever, but believe me, we have been. [That happened] on the first album and that's probably why we are where we are now, but it was hell and I feel awful about it and I'm not going to do it anymore.

In another interview, Vedder stated:

These attitudes out there...that it's the industry's music... And it's not. It's mine. And it's yours. Whoever's listening to it. It's mine and it's yours. And everybody in between, they're the distributors. I think that something like a music channel can be very powerful. Sometimes they think they're the ones who decide what's heard. I think that's a dangerous situation. And, I think, what's more dangerous is that they think it belongs to them. That's probably what "Not for You" is about.

== Release and reception ==
"Not for You" was released as a single on February 13, 1995, in Australia and the United Kingdom. The release contains a previously unreleased B-side titled "Out of My Mind". The song peaked at number 12 on the Billboard Album Rock Tracks chart and number 38 on the Billboard Modern Rock Tracks chart. Outside the United States, "Not for You" reached the top 40 in the UK and peaked at number 29 on the Australian Singles Chart. "Not for You" reached the top 30 in Ireland and the top 10 in New Zealand.

== Live performances ==
"Not for You" was first performed live at the band's March 7, 1994, concert in Denver, Colorado at the Paramount Theatre. The song was performed on Saturday Night Live - without the explicit lyrics - in April 1994, almost eight months before the release of Vitalogy. Live performances of "Not for You" can be found on the Hype! soundtrack, various official bootlegs, the Live at the Gorge 05/06 box set, and the live album Live at Lollapalooza 2007. A performance of the song is also included on the DVD Touring Band 2000. The version of the song on the Hype! soundtrack was recorded live on Pearl Jam's 1995 Self-Pollution satellite radio broadcast, a four-and-a-half-hour-long pirate broadcast out of Seattle which was available to any radio stations that wanted to carry it.

== Track listing ==
All songs were written by Dave Abbruzzese, Jeff Ament, Stone Gossard, Mike McCready, and Eddie Vedder.

1. "Not for You" – 5:51
2. "Out of My Mind" (live) – 4:41
  - Improv recorded live on April 2, 1994, at the Fox Theatre in Atlanta, Georgia.

== Charts ==
Chart (1995)	Peak position
Australia (ARIA)	29
Europe (Eurochart Hot 100)	95
Ireland (IRMA)	26
New Zealand (Recorded Music NZ)	10
Scotland Singles (OCC)	28
UK Singles (OCC)	34
US Alternative Airplay (Billboard)	38
US Mainstream Rock (Billboard)	12
