= Suck You Dry =

1992 single by Mudhoney

Single by Mudhoney

from the album Piece of Cake
- B-side: "Deception Pass"
- Released: October 12, 1992
- Recorded: 1991–1992
- Genre: Grunge
- Length: 2:34
- Label: Reprise
- Songwriters: Mark Arm; Steve Turner; Dan Peters; Matt Lukin
- Producers: Conrad Uno; Mudhoney

Mudhoney singles chronology
"Let It Slide" (1991)	"Suck You Dry" (1992)	"Blinding Sun" (1993)

"Suck You Dry" is a song by the American rock band Mudhoney from their third studio album, Piece of Cake (1992). It was released on October 12, 1992, by Warner Records as the first single from the album.

== Track listing ==
All tracks are written by Mudhoney, except where noted.

7"
No.	Title	Length
1.	"Suck You Dry"	2:30
2.	"Deception Pass"	2:53

12" / CD
No.	Title	Writer(s)	Length
1.	"Suck You Dry"		2:30
2.	"Deception Pass"		2:53
3.	"Over the Top"	Ian Kilmister, Phil Taylor, Eddie Clarke	2:35
4.	"Underide"		2:05

Cassette
No.	Title	Length
1.	"Suck You Dry"	2:30
2.	"Deception Pass"	2:53
3.	"Suck You Dry"	2:30
4.	"Deception Pass"	2:53

- Plays same both sides.

== Charts ==
Chart performance for "Suck You Dry"
Chart (1992)	Peak position
Australia Alternative (ARIA)	6
UK Singles (Official Charts)	65
US Alternative Airplay (Billboard)	23

== Release history ==
Release dates and formats for "Suck You Dry"
Region	Date	Format(s)	Label(s)	Ref.
United Kingdom	October 12, 1992	7-inch vinyl; 12-inch vinyl; CD; cassette	Warner	
Australia	October 26, 1992	CD	Warner	
