= Dave Abbruzzese =

American musician

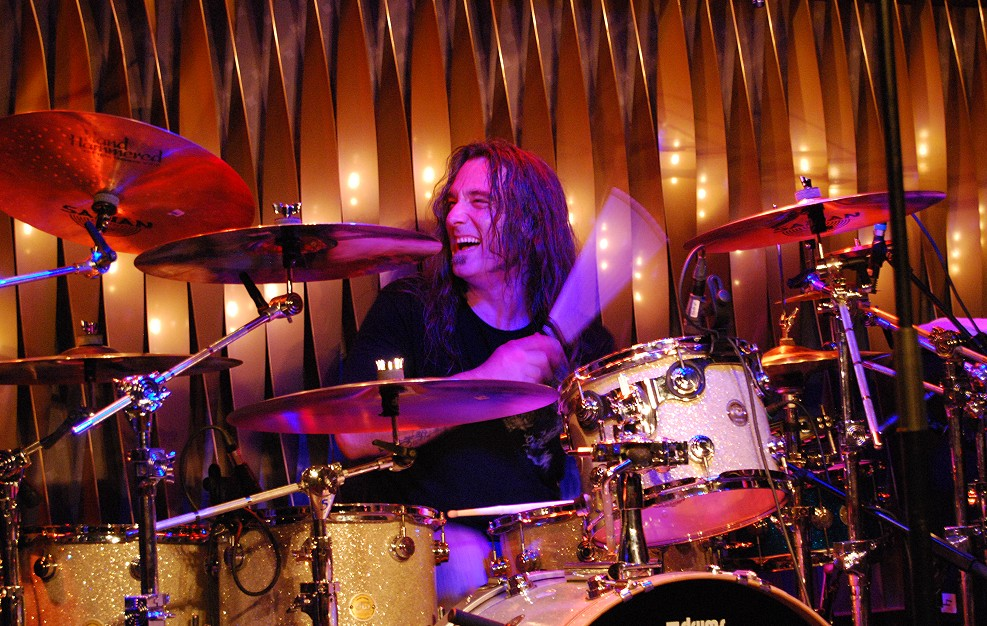
- Abbruzzese performing in 2009

Background information
- Born: David James Abbruzzese; May 17, 1968 (age 58); Stamford, Connecticut, U.S.
- Genres: Grunge, alternative rock, hard rock
- Occupation: Musician
- Instrument: Drums
- Formerly of: Pearl Jam

David James Abbruzzese (Italian pronunciation: [abbrutˈtseːze, -eːse]; born May 17, 1968) is an American musician who was the drummer for the American rock band Pearl Jam from 1991 to 1994. He replaced drummer Matt Chamberlain in 1991, shortly before the release of the band's debut album, Ten. Abbruzzese played on the band's following records, Vs. and Vitalogy.

== Biography ==
=== Early life ===
Dave Abbruzzese was born in Stamford, Connecticut, and grew up in Mesquite, Texas, where he attended Vanston Jr. High. Abbruzzese grew up drumming on his dad's tackle boxes. While living at home the only thing in his bedroom (besides a bed) was his drum set. Abbruzzese dropped out of North Mesquite High School and focused on performing music. He started playing in various Texas-based bands including Segueway, Flaming Hemorrhoids, and Course of Empire. Abbruzzese also formed a band called Dr. Tongue, a three-piece, funk-influenced band that gigged in the Dallas and Denton area.

=== Pearl Jam ===
In 1991, Abbruzzese got a call from drummer and friend Matt Chamberlain, whom Abbruzzese knew through the Texas music scene, in regard to filling in for him in the band Pearl Jam when he left. Chamberlain had his eyes set on G. E. Smith's band on Saturday Night Live. Abbruzzese left for Seattle, Washington to meet and become acquainted with the members of Pearl Jam. Although his musical tastes were far different from the other members, Abbruzzese chose to join Pearl Jam, playing his first show on August 23, 1991. Initially, Abbruzzese was reluctant to join the band full-time. Then after his second show with Pearl Jam, Abbruzzese went straight down to his local tattoo parlor and had bassist Jeff Ament's stick figure drawing from the sleeve of the "Alive" single tattooed onto his left shoulder. Abbruzzese joined the group and played the rest of Pearl Jam's live shows supporting the Ten album. Abbruzzese toured extensively for Ten and performed on MTV Unplugged and a Saturday Night Live appearance. Abbruzzese made his studio debut with Pearl Jam when the band released the single "Even Flow" in April 1992. They re-recorded the song for its single release with Abbruzzese on drums instead of original drummer Dave Krusen. Two songs for the Singles Soundtrack and the b-side "Dirty Frank" also came from the same recording session. The band found itself amidst the sudden popularity and attention given to the Seattle music scene and the genre known as grunge.

With Abbruzzese, the band recorded its second studio album, Vs., released in 1993. Upon its release, Vs. set at the time the record for most copies of an album sold in a week, and spent five weeks at number one on the Billboard 200. Vs. was nominated for a Grammy Award for Best Rock Album in 1995. From Vs., the song "Daughter" received a Grammy nomination for Best Rock Performance by a Duo or Group with Vocal and the song "Go" received a Grammy nomination for Best Hard Rock Performance. Abbruzzese toured extensively for Vs. and performed on a Saturday Night Live appearance. Abbruzzese was the primary songwriter for the music in the band's songs "Go", "Last Exit" and "Angel" (from the 1993 fan club Christmas single). He played with Pearl Jam through April 17, 1994. In 1994, the band began a much-publicized boycott of Ticketmaster.

Abbruzzese performed on the band's third studio album Vitalogy. However, he was fired in August 1994 due to personality conflicts with the band members, four months before the album was released. Ament stated, "Dave was a different egg for sure. There were a lot of things, personality wise, where I didn't see eye to eye with him. He was more comfortable being a rock star than the rest of us. Partying, girls, cars. I don't know if anyone was in the same space." Guitarist Stone Gossard said, "It was the nature of how the politics worked in our band: It was up to me to say, 'Hey, we tried, it's not working; time to move on.' On a superficial level, it was a political struggle: For whatever reason his ability to communicate with Ed and Jeff was very stifled. I certainly don't think it was all Dave Abbruzzese's fault that it was stifled." Abbruzzese stated, "I didn't really agree with what was going on. I didn't agree with the Ticketmaster stuff at all. But I don't blame anyone or harbor any hard feelings. I'd be lying if I said I wasn't furious and hurt for a long time. But now I just wish there was more music from the band I was a part of."

On October 18, 2016, Pearl Jam was named among the 2017 class of nominees for induction in the Rock and Roll Hall of Fame. The only former member of Pearl Jam to be inducted was the group's original drummer, Dave Krusen, which led Abbruzzese to criticize his omission. "The members of Pearl Jam have got to know what's the right thing to do," he wrote, in a social media post. "They can't justify ignoring my contributions. Like me or not. If there is still a part of that band that remembers how hard we worked, how much blood and how much sweat ... They will do the right thing." He added, "That band and its management have never been ones to shy away when an injustice is done. Let’s see if they still have the courage to fight the good fight!"

Pearl Jam later responded with an open letter on Facebook inviting all of the band's former drummers to the induction.

== Other musical projects ==
On September 30, 1997, Abbruzzese's newly formed band, the Green Romance Orchestra, released Play Parts I & V. The album saw Abbruzzese bring his own songs to the drawing board, as well as play the role of a producer. Play Parts I & V is a release of Free Association Records, which was formed by Abbruzzese in 1996. In 1997, Abbruzzese rehearsed with Axl Rose during the making of Guns N' Roses' 2008 album, Chinese Democracy. However, none of the material from the sessions ended up on the album.

Afterward, Abbruzzese worked with HairyApesBMX. He mixed, produced, and engineered the band's 2000 album, Out Demons. Abbruzzese also lent the band a hand behind his drum kit on its Midwestern tour. Abbruzzese drummed on the IMF tour with Jara Harris, Stevie Salas, and Bernard Fowler in early 2016. Abbruzzese has also collaborated with Shawn Smith of Brad and Satchel. They released their song "Like the Child of The Water I Am" for online download on December 26, 2015, and stated that their collaboration is ongoing and more music would be released in 2016.

Dave Abbruzzese is also part of the Indian multi-city grunge outfit Pseutopia, featuring Laji George on Vocals, Shyam Narayan on Bass, and Mithun Raju (from Thaikkudam Bridge) on Guitars. His first track with Pseutopia was a tribute to Chris Cornell's track "Seasons" that was released on YouTube on December 18, 2018. Since then Pseutopia has released their second track "Brother" on May 12, 2022.

== Musical style and influences ==
Abbruzzese has cited John Bonham, Sly & the Family Stone, and the Red Hot Chili Peppers as influences. Abbruzzese's trademarks include heavy use of splash cymbals, the double-stroke roll, and a fast right foot. Abbruzzese refused to use two bass drums or a double-kick pedal, instead concentrating on playing the best he could with a single pedal. Abbruzzese is also known to be a particularly hard hitter, which may be reflected in him having suffered from carpal tunnel syndrome at one time.

== Equipment ==
On his earlier, pre-Vs. Pearl Jam recordings, such as the tracks recorded for Singles: Original Motion Picture Soundtrack and the video version of "Even Flow", Abbruzzese is known to have used Ludwig drums. As of the Vs. record, he endorsed and used Drum Workshop drums, Sabian cymbals, and seemed to favor an 8x12 Brady snare drum. Abbruzzese also had his own line of signature drumsticks, manufactured and marketed by Pro-Mark, but the model bearing his name appears to have been discontinued.

== Personal life ==
Abbruzzese married Laura Whisman, on September 2, 2006; they later separated.

== Discography ==
=== Pearl Jam discography ===
Year	Title	Label	Track(s)
1992	Singles: Original Motion Picture Soundtrack	Epic	"Breath" and "State of Love and Trust"
1993	Sweet Relief: A Benefit for Victoria Williams	Thirsty Ear/Chaos	"Crazy Mary" (with Victoria Williams)
1993	Judgment Night: Music from the Motion Picture	Epic	"Real Thing" (with Cypress Hill)
1993	Vs.	Epic	All
1994	Vitalogy	Epic	All except "Hey Foxymophandlemama, That's Me"
1998	Chicago Cab: Soundtrack	Loosegroove	"Hard to Imagine"
1999	Movie Music: The Definitive Performances (Also part of the box set, Sony Music 100 Years: Soundtrack for a Century.)	Columbia/Epic/Legacy	"State of Love and Trust"
2000	Wild and Wooly: The Northwest Rock Collection	Sub Pop	"Even Flow" (live)
2003	Lost Dogs	Epic	"Hard to Imagine" and "Dirty Frank"
2004	Riding Giants: Music from the Motion Picture	Milan	"Go"
2004	rearviewmirror	Epic	"Even Flow", "State of Love and Trust", "Animal", "Go", "Dissident", "Rearviewmirror", "Spin the Black Circle", "Corduroy", "Not for You", "Breath", "Daughter", "Elderly Woman Behind the Counter in a Small Town", "Immortality", "Better Man", and "Nothingman"
2019	MTV Unplugged	Legacy	All

=== Green Romance Orchestra discography ===
Year	Title	Label
1997	Play Parts I & V	Free Association Records

=== Contributions and collaborations ===
Year	Group	Title	Label	Track(s)
1992	Course of Empire	Course of Empire	Volcano	"God's Jig"
1995	Corey Glover, Eric Schenkman, Billy Cox, and Dave Abbruzzese	In From the Storm: Jimi Hendrix Tribute	RCA	"In From the Storm"
1995	Doug Pinnick, Eric Schenkman, Noel Redding, and Dave Abbruzzese	In From the Storm: Jimi Hendrix Tribute	RCA	"Burning of the Midnight Lamp"
1996	Nicklebag	12 Hits and a Bump	Iguana	"Sweet Thang"
1997	Stevie Salas	Alter Native Gold	Pony Canyon	All
1997	Nicklebag	Mas Feedback	Lizard Group	"Sweet Thang"
1998	Stevie Salas	The Sometimes Almost Never Was	Pony Canyon	Some
2000	HairyApesBMX	Out Demons	Free Association/We Sell Soul	Some
2006	Bernard Fowler	Friends with Privileges	Peregrine	"Pop That Thang"
2006	Stevie Salas	Be What It Is	R&C Ltd.	Some
2007	Stevie Salas	The Sun and the Earth, Vol. 1	Arbor	Some
2015	208 Talks of Angels	Made in Hell	208 Talks of angels	Angle of View
2021	Strange Sense of Comfort	Music to Blow Your Head Off	Underground Records	
