= Better Man (Pearl Jam song) =

1994 song by Pearl Jam

Song by Pearl Jam

from the album Vitalogy
- Released: November 22, 1994
- Venue: Fox Theatre (Atlanta, Georgia)
- Genre: Alternative rock; grunge; pop rock
- Length: 4:28
- Label: Epic
- Songwriter: Eddie Vedder
- Producers: Brendan O'Brien; Pearl Jam

Audio sample
- file; help

"Better Man" is a song by the American rock band Pearl Jam. It is the eleventh track on the band's third studio album, Vitalogy (1994). The song was written by vocalist Eddie Vedder. Despite the lack of a commercial single release, "Better Man" topped the US Billboard Album Rock Tracks chart, spending eight weeks at number one. The song was included on Pearl Jam's 2004 greatest hits album, rearviewmirror (Greatest Hits 1991–2003).

== Origin and recording ==
The song was written by vocalist Eddie Vedder when he was in high school. He said, "I wrote 'Better Man' before I could drink—legally—on a four-track in my old apartment." In another interview, Vedder stated, "Sometimes I think of how far I've come from the teenager sitting on the bed in San Diego writing 'Better Man' and wondering if anyone would ever even hear it."

He first performed it with a San Diego, California–based group called Bad Radio, with slightly faster tempo but altogether quite similar to the Vitalogy rendition. Vedder later recorded it with Pearl Jam, although his bandmates were initially reluctant to record it and had initially rejected it from Vs. because it had a more mainstream, pop-oriented sound than their usual material.

Producer Brendan O'Brien said of the song:

There's a great song we recorded for Vs., "Better Man," which ended up on Vitalogy. One of the first rehearsals we did they played it and I said "Man, that song's a hit." Eddie just went "uhhh". I immediately knew I'd just said the wrong thing. We cut it once for Vs., he wanted to give it away to this Greenpeace benefit record, the idea was that the band was going to play and some other singer was going to sing it. I remember saying to the engineer, Nick [DiDia], "This is one of their best songs and they're going to give it away! Can't happen!" And we went to record it and I'm not going to say we didn't try very hard, but it didn't end up sounding very good. I may have even sabotaged that version but I won't admit to that. It took us to the next record, recording it two more times, before he became comfortable with it because it was such a blatantly great pop song.

The version of the song released on Vitalogy consisted of several different recordings. The introduction was originally recorded for another song, while the majority of the track were recorded during the live performance of the song on April 3, 1994, at The Fox Theatre (Atlanta) and overdubbed with studio recordings.

== Lyrics ==
Al Weisel of Rolling Stone called the song a "haunting ballad about a woman trapped in a bad relationship." When Pearl Jam performed "Better Man" on VH1 Storytellers in 2006, Vedder introduced it as a song about "abusive relationships." Before a performance of the song at Pearl Jam's show on April 3, 1994, in Atlanta at the Fox Theatre, Vedder clearly said "it's dedicated to the bastard that married my Momma." He was referring to his stepfather, Peter Mueller, a California attorney whom Vedder had long believed to be his biological father and who divorced his mother in the early 1980s.

== Reception ==
Although never released as a single, "Better Man" nonetheless became one of Pearl Jam's most-played songs on the radio in the U.S. "Better Man" became the most successful song from Vitalogy on the American rock charts. At the 13th annual Pop Music Awards of the American Society of Composers, Authors and Publishers, "Better Man" was cited as one of the most-performed ASCAP songs of 1995. Chris True of AllMusic proclaimed it as "arguably the stand out track on 1994's Vitalogy—and equally arguably—[one of] the band's better songs in the whole of their career." He added, "Vitalogy was, admittedly, the end of Pearl Jam's reign as top rock act and it's because of songs like "Better Man" that they were able to stay there without succumbing to all the traps of stardom and shameless marketing."

In 2021, American Songwriter and Kerrang each ranked the song number six on their lists of the greatest Pearl Jam songs.

== Live performances ==
Pearl Jam first performed "Better Man" live at a concert on May 13, 1993, in San Francisco at Slim's Café, almost six months before the release of Vs.. At the time, the song had more of an up-tempo beat attached to it. The band often performs the song live as a medley with the English Beat's "Save It for Later". Vedder has acknowledged that the song's chord progression is largely derived from "Save It for Later" and the two songs are very similar.

Throughout Pearl Jam's Binaural Tour (2000), Vedder often performed the song "Romanza" as an intro to "Better Man", with it being played most recently in 2005. At the last Vote for Change concert on October 13, 2004, in East Rutherford, New Jersey at Continental Airlines Arena, Vedder made a guest appearance with Bruce Springsteen and the E Street Band and sang "Better Man" upon Springsteen's request; the audience sang along. Pearl Jam performed the song for its appearance on VH1 Storytellers in 2006. At Pearl Jam's August 29, 2006, concert in Arnhem, Netherlands at the Gelredome, Vedder sang Bob Marley's "No Woman, No Cry" at the beginning of "Better Man".

== Personnel ==
Personnel are taken from the Vitalogy liner notes, except where noted.

Pearl Jam

- Eddie Vedder – vocals, guitar
- Stone Gossard – guitar
- Mike McCready – guitar
- Jeff Ament – bass guitar
- Dave Abbruzzese – drums

Additional musician

- Brendan O'Brien – Hammond organ, pump organ, Crumar bass pedals

== Charts ==
=== Weekly charts ===
Weekly chart performance for "Better Man"
Chart (1995)	Peak position
Canada Top Singles (RPM)	9
Iceland (Íslenski Listinn Topp 40)	5
US Radio Songs (Billboard)	13
US Alternative Airplay (Billboard)	2
US Mainstream Rock (Billboard)	1
US Pop Airplay (Billboard)	13

=== Year-end charts ===
Year-end chart performance for "Better Man"
Chart (1995)	Position
Canada Top Singles (RPM)	71
US Hot 100 Airplay (Billboard)	26
US Album Rock Tracks (Billboard)	3
US Modern Rock Tracks (Billboard)	21
US Top 40/Mainstream (Billboard)	39

== Certifications ==
Region	Certification	Certified units/sales
New Zealand (RMNZ)	2× Platinum	60,000^{‡}
^{‡} Sales+streaming figures based on certification alone.
