= Vs. (Pearl Jam album) =

1993 studio album by Pearl Jam

- CD edition cover art

Studio album by Pearl Jam
- Released: October 11, 1993
- Recorded: February–May 1993
- Studios: The Site (Nicasio); Potatohead (Seattle)
- Genres: Grunge; alternative rock; hard rock
- Length: 46:11
- Label: Epic
- Producers: Brendan O'Brien; Pearl Jam

Pearl Jam chronology
Ten (1991)	Vs. (1993)	Vitalogy (1994)

Alternative cover
- Vinyl edition cover art

Singles from Vs.
- 1. "Go" Released: October 11, 1993; 2. "Daughter" Released: December 20, 1993; 3. "Animal" Released: April 4, 1994; 4. "Dissident" Released: May 16, 1994

Vs. (pronounced versus) is the second studio album by American rock band Pearl Jam, released on October 11, 1993 in the United Kingdom and on October 19 in the US. The album was their first collaboration with producer Brendan O'Brien, who would work with the band regularly in the future, and also their first album to feature drummer Dave Abbruzzese. Vs. had a deliberately more abrasive sound than their debut album.

The band scaled back its promotional efforts for Vs., declining to produce music videos for any of the album's singles. Upon its release, the album sold 950,378 copies in its first five days on sale, which set the record for most copies of an album sold during its first week since SoundScan began tracking sales data in 1991, a record it held for five years. It occupied the No. 1 spot on the Billboard 200 chart for five weeks, the longest duration for a Pearl Jam album. Vs. received critical acclaim and has been certified 7× platinum by the Recording Industry Association of America (RIAA) for sales of at least seven million copies in the United States.

== Recording ==
For its second album, Pearl Jam felt the pressure of trying to match the success of its debut album, Ten. In a 2002 interview, the guitarist Mike McCready said, "The band was blown up pretty big and everything was pretty crazy." Vs. was the first Pearl Jam album to have production duties handled by Brendan O'Brien. It was also the band's first album with the drummer Dave Abbruzzese, who had joined the band in August 1991 and toured for the album Ten. Rehearsals for Vs. began in February 1993 at Potatohead Studio in Seattle. The band then moved to The Site in Nicasio, California, in March 1993 to begin recording. Abbruzzese called the tranquil recording site "paradise" while the singer Eddie Vedder said, "I fucking hate it here ... I've had a hard time ... How do you make a rock record here?"

The band took the approach of recording one song at a time, and agreed with O'Brien to mix the songs as each one was finished. O'Brien had the band members set up much as they do live, and most of the songs were developed out of jam sessions. The guitarist Stone Gossard said, "I think we allowed things to develop in a more natural, band-oriented sort of way, rather than me bringing in a bunch of stuff that was already arranged." Gossard added that most of the songs were arranged once Vedder joined in and started singing, elaborating, "You could tell when the music wanted to change just by the way he was singing." In a 2009 interview, Gossard stated, "[Vs.] was probably where it felt better recording-wise. I saw how it could change and evolve which gave me a lot of inspiration to go we can do ballads, we can do fast stuff, we can do slow stuff, we can do punk stuff. That was where I realized there were going to be a lot of places to go with Ed."

The first week of recording produced "Go", "Blood", "Rats", and "Leash" before the band hit a lull. In order to keep up his intensity, Vedder traveled into San Francisco and began sleeping in his truck, as well as the sauna at the recording studio. The bassist Jeff Ament said, "Recording Vs., there was a lot more pressure on Ed. The whole follow-up. I thought we were playing so well as a band that it would take care of itself ... He was having a hard time finishing up the songs; the pressure, and not being comfortable being in such a nice place." Ament added that "toward the end it got fairly intense" and that the band "tried to make it as uncomfortable for [Vedder] as we could." Eventually the band was able to get "back on track" according to Ament as Vedder was allowed "to get in the space of his songs". The album was finished in May 1993. Vedder later said, "The second record, that was the one I enjoyed making the least ... I just didn't feel comfortable in the place we were at because it was very comfortable. I didn't like that at all."

== Music and lyrics ==
"Go"
A sample of "Go", the first single released from the album. The song's main guitar riff was written by Abbruzzese.

"Daughter"
A sample of "Daughter", the second single released from the album. The song has an acoustic sound and lyrics written by Vedder about a child who is abused by her parents because they do not understand her learning disability. The song became a hit and helped solidify the group's success following Ten.

The album featured a much looser and rawer sound compared to the band's debut album, Ten. Ament said, "When we made Vs., our second record, I remember thinking, 'Man, I wish our first record sounded like this.' I thought it was more direct, more powerful." Besides the heavier songs, the album features two acoustic ballads in "Daughter" and "Elderly Woman Behind the Counter in a Small Town". A few songs incorporate elements of funk, including "Animal", "Blood", and "Rats". McCready stated that it was not that the band "sat down and decided to be funky", but rather it came from the band "exploring different directions and combining our influences". Paul Evans of Rolling Stone said "'Animal', 'Daughter' and 'Blood' ... are songs of a kind of ritual passion, tapping into something truly wild." In a 2002 interview, Gossard said, "We got our heavyosity out on that record."

The songs on the album tackle personal as well as social and political concerns. Vedder said that "you write what comes to you ... You try to reflect the mood of the songs." Topics on the album include child abuse ("Daughter"), gun culture ("Glorified G"), police racism ("W.M.A."), and the media ("Blood"). "Daughter", "Dissident", and "Elderly Woman Behind the Counter in a Small Town" are three storytelling songs. "Daughter" tells the story of a child who is abused by her parents because they do not understand her learning disability; "Dissident" tells the story of a woman who takes in a political fugitive; and "Elderly Woman Behind the Counter in a Small Town" tells the story of an old lady who has been stuck in a small town her whole life.

"Glorified G", a song mocking gun enthusiasts, was inspired by an incident that involved Abbruzzese telling the band he had just bought two guns, which sparked a conversation about guns within the band. "W.M.A." was inspired by an incident that happened outside Pearl Jam's rehearsal studio in which Vedder got into an altercation with a group of police officers who hassled a black friend of his but ignored him. Vedder said that "Rearviewmirror" is about being "in a car, leaving ... a bad situation". Vedder stated that "Rats" is about the idea that "rats are probably a hell of a lot more admirable" than humans. "Leash" was written about the same girl that the Ten song "Why Go" is about. Regarding "Indifference", Vedder said it is about "[trying to] do something to make some other peoples' lives better than they are, even if it means going through hell. Three Faces of Me."

== Release and reception ==
Professional ratings
Review scores
Source	Rating
AllMusic	4/5 stars
Chicago Sun-Times	3.5/4 stars
Entertainment Weekly	B−
Los Angeles Times	3/4 stars
NME	4/10
Orlando Sentinel	4/5 stars
Pitchfork	7.6/10
Rolling Stone	4.5/5 stars
The Sydney Morning Herald	4/4 stars
USA Today	4/4 stars

Vs. was released in the United States on October 19, 1993. The album sold 950,378 copies in its first five days of release, which set a record for the most copies of an album sold in its first week of release since SoundScan began tracking sales data in 1991, surpassing the record held by Use Your Illusion II by Guns N' Roses in 1991, as well as the second-highest single week sales, behind the 1.06 million copies sold by The Bodyguard soundtrack over Christmas 1992. It outperformed all other entries in the Billboard Top 10 that week combined. Vs. held the first week sales record for five years until it was broken by Garth Brooks' 1998 album, Double Live, which sold 1.08 million copies in its first week. While Double Live officially beat Vs. in first week sales, Vs. still holds an unbreakable record in that SoundScan only counted the first five days of an album's release in its first week sales until 1998. The album has been certified 7× platinum by the Recording Industry Association of America (RIAA), and, as of July 2013, has sold 7,400,000 copies in the United States according to Nielsen SoundScan.

In the UK the album was released on October 11, 1993, it charted in second place behind the new album Everything Changes by Take That, and would remain in the chart for 33 weeks.

Rolling Stone staff writer Paul Evans gave Vs. a favorable review, saying, "Few American bands have arrived more clearly talented than this one did with Ten; and Vs. tops even that debut." He added, "Like Jim Morrison and Pete Townshend, Vedder makes a forte of his psychological-mythic explorations ... As guitarists Stone Gossard and Mike McCready paint dense and slashing backdrops, he invites us into a drama of experiment and strife." Jon Pareles of The New York Times stated that "Pearl Jam uses its new album ... to broaden its music," and added that "most of the album ... projects individual misery as public catharsis." AllMusic staff writer Steve Huey gave the album four out of five stars, saying "Vs. may not reach the majestic heights of Ten, but at least half the record stands with Pearl Jam's best work."

David Browne of Entertainment Weekly gave the album a B−. He said, "Vs. is not a carbon copy of Ten; for that alone, [Pearl Jam] get points." However, he countered by saying that "Vs. confirms once and for all that there's nothing underground or alternative about [Pearl Jam]." Village Voice critic Robert Christgau gave the album a "dud" rating.

Pearl Jam made a conscious decision beginning with the release of Vs. to scale back its commercial efforts. "We pulled back after the second record pretty hard," Ament stated. "A lot of it had to do with being in the eye of the storm and not being able to think straight." The band declined to produce music videos after the very successful "Jeremy", and opted to give fewer interviews as well as make fewer television appearances. "Ten years from now," Ament said, "I don't want people to remember our songs as videos."

Vs. included the singles "Go", "Daughter", "Animal", and "Dissident", all of which placed on the Album Rock and Modern Rock charts. "Daughter" was the most successful song from Vs. on the rock charts, reaching the number one spot on both the Album Rock and Modern Rock charts and spending a total of eight weeks at number one on the former. Album tracks "Glorified G" and "Elderly Woman Behind the Counter in a Small Town" also charted. At the 1995 Grammy Awards, "Daughter" received a nomination for Best Rock Performance by a Duo or Group with Vocal and "Go" received a nomination for Best Hard Rock Performance. Vs. received a nomination for Best Rock Album.

In 2011, Pearl Jam released a remastered Vs., along with Vitalogy, in three formats: an Expanded Version, a three-CD Deluxe Edition and a Limited Edition Collector's Boxed Set. The Expanded Version features three bonus tracks recorded by Brendan O'Brien at The Site studio during the Vs. sessions: a previously unreleased acoustic version of "Hold On", "Cready Stomp" - a previously unreleased studio outtake, and the band's cover of Victoria Williams' "Crazy Mary" featuring Williams on backing vocals and guitar, which had previously been issued on the 1993 tribute album, Sweet Relief: A Benefit for Victoria Williams. The three-CD Deluxe Edition features both the Legacy Versions of Vs. and Vitalogy with their bonus tracks and a copy of Live at the Orpheum Theater, Boston, April 12, 1994.

== Packaging ==
The album's cover art, photographed by Ament, features a black-and-white picture of an angora goat behind a fence in Lifeline Farm in Victor, Montana. According to Ament, the cover was a representation of how the band felt at the time, with Ament stating "we were slaves". The album booklet contains additional drawings and writings by Vedder, including one page apparently doodled at a business meeting that says "I will never trust anybody again." The lyric page for "W.M.A." features a portion of a news story concerning Malice Green, a victim of police brutality.

Originally, the album was titled Five Against One (The song "Animal" features the lyric "One, two, three, four, five against one ..."). Concerning the original album title, Gossard said, "For me, that title represented a lot of struggles that you go through trying to make a record ... Your own independence—your own soul—versus everybody else's." The album title was changed at the last minute, first to a self-titled album and then to Vs., a nod to the general theme of conflict present in most of the songs on the album. Regarding the title Vs., Vedder said, "They were writing all these articles ... Our band against somebody else's band. What the hell are they talking about? You know, don't try to separate the powers that be. We're all in this together."

The decision to change the album's name at the last minute resulted in a few different versions of the album. There are also different versions of the album that are unrelated to the title. Regarding the different versions of the album, some of the first pressings of the cassette still contained Five Against One printed on the cassette itself, the first couple of pressings of the cassette do not contain the title printed on the artwork at all, and the lyrics to "Indifference" are included in the cassette version. The first couple of pressings of the CD do not contain the title printed on the artwork at all, and the initial versions of the CD came in an Ecopak, which was a variation on the traditional CD-sized Digipak. While not rare, they went out of print quickly and are now hard to find. The song titles are not printed on the back cover of this version, but the artwork remains the same. The vinyl version has never had the title printed on it, and the cover art on the vinyl copies is different from the CD and cassette. For all versions, the picture of the "elderly woman" changed at some point after the first pressings. Allegedly, the original woman never gave permission for her picture to be used, so Pearl Jam changed the picture to another woman. The difference is easy to spot, as "the new and improved woman behind the counter" is printed below the picture.

== Tour ==
Pearl Jam promoted the album with tours in the United States in the fall of 1993 and the spring of 1994. The fall 1993 tour focused on the Western United States, while the spring 1994 tour focused on the Eastern United States. Industry insiders compared Pearl Jam's tour to the touring habits of Led Zeppelin, in that the band "ignored the press and took its music directly to the fans". During this tour the band set a cap on ticket prices in the attempt to thwart scalpers.

Several songs from the band's third album, Vitalogy, were premiered during this tour. The band's April 3, 1994, concert in Atlanta at the Fox Theatre was broadcast live on the radio in the United States. A few days later, the body of Nirvana frontman Kurt Cobain was found in his home in Seattle due to an apparent suicide, which deeply affected Vedder. At the band's April 8, 1994, concert in Fairfax, Virginia, at the Patriot Center, Vedder proclaimed, "I don't think any of us would be in this room tonight if it weren't for Kurt Cobain." Vedder later said that "the day that we found out about Kurt ... I was just spinning. I was lost and didn't know if we should play, or if we should just go home, or if we should attend the services. I still have some regrets about that, even though in the end it was probably better that we played the last two weeks of the tour. I decided I would play those next two weeks and then I'd never have to play again."

Pearl Jam was outraged when it discovered after a pair of shows in Chicago in March 1994 that ticket vendor Ticketmaster had added a service charge to the tickets. Following the tour, the band brought a lawsuit against Ticketmaster that accused them of being a monopoly whose anticompetitive practices allowed markup prices of more than 30%. The band's intention was to get ticket prices lowered for its fans. Pearl Jam's plans for a 1994 summer tour were cancelled as a result of a Ticketmaster boycott.

On April 16, 2016, at the Bon Secours Wellness Arena in Greenville, South Carolina, Pearl Jam played the entire album in order as part of the band's set.

== Track listing ==
All lyrics are written by Eddie Vedder, except as noted. All music is written by Pearl Jam (Stone Gossard, Jeff Ament, Mike McCready, Vedder, Dave Abbruzzese), except as noted.

No.	Title	Length
1.	"Go"	3:12
2.	"Animal"	2:49
3.	"Daughter"	3:55
4.	"Glorified G"	3:26
5.	"Dissident"	3:35
6.	"W.M.A."	5:59
7.	"Blood"	2:50
8.	"Rearviewmirror"	4:44
9.	"Rats"	4:15
10.	"Elderly Woman Behind the Counter in a Small Town"	3:15
11.	"Leash"	3:09
12.	"Indifference"	5:02
Total length:		46:11

Reissue bonus tracks
No.	Title	Lyrics	Music	Length
13.	"Hold On" (acoustic demo)		Stone Gossard	4:40
14.	"Cready Stomp"	(Instrumental)	Mike McCready	3:23
15.	"Crazy Mary"	Victoria Williams	Victoria Williams	5:39
Total length:				59:53

=== Reissue bonus material ===
==== Vs. Tour bonus live CD ====
Performed April 12, 1994, at the Orpheum Theater, Boston, MA. The penultimate show of the Vs. tour, this concert featured some songs from the upcoming follow-up album Vitalogy. The CD omits eight songs from the original performance: "State of Love and Trust", "Hard to Imagine", "Go", "Animal", "Alone", "Better Man", "Yellow Ledbetter", "I've Got a Feeling" (The Beatles cover).

1. "Oceans" (music: Vedder, Gossard, Ament)
2. "Even Flow" (music: Gossard)
3. "Sonic Reducer" (Dead Boys cover; guest performance: Mark Arm)
4. "Immortality"
5. "Glorified G"
6. "Daughter"
7. "Not for You"
8. "Rats"
9. "Blood"
10. "Release" (music: Vedder, Gossard, Ament, McCready, Dave Krusen)
11. "Tremor Christ"
12. "Once" (music: Gossard)
13. "Fuckin' Up" (Neil Young cover)
14. "Dirty Frank"
15. "Rearviewmirror"
16. "Elderly Woman Behind the Counter in a Small Town"

== Outtakes ==
Two songs recorded during the sessions but left off the album later appeared on the band's follow-up Vitalogy: "Whipping" and "Better Man". Both songs made their live debuts at the band's May 13, 1993, concert in San Francisco at Slim's Café, where the band premiered most of the newly recorded songs for Vs. "Better Man" was said to have been rejected because Vedder was not comfortable with the song's accessibility. Another song recorded during the sessions is "Hard to Imagine", which later appeared on the soundtrack for the 1998 film, Chicago Cab; however, that version was recorded during sessions for Vitalogy. The version recorded for Vs. appears on the 2003 rarities compilation, Lost Dogs. According to Gossard, "Hard to Imagine" was cut from Vs. because the band already had enough mellow songs for the album. Pearl Jam's cover of the Victoria Williams song "Crazy Mary" (to which Williams herself contributed background vocals and guitar) was also recorded during these sessions. "Crazy Mary" appeared on the 1993 tribute album, Sweet Relief: A Benefit for Victoria Williams, and later on the 2011 Vs. reissue, as a bonus track. The Pearl Jam/Cypress Hill collaboration "Real Thing" was also recorded around this time. "Real Thing" appeared on the 1993 Judgment Night soundtrack.

== Personnel ==
Pearl Jam

- Dave Abbruzzese – drums, percussion
- Jeff Ament – bass, upright bass
- Stone Gossard – rhythm guitar, lead guitar on "Rats"
- Mike McCready – lead guitar, rhythm guitar on "Rats", EBow on "Rearviewmirror"
- Eddie Vedder – vocals, rhythm guitar on "Rearviewmirror" and "Elderly Woman Behind the Counter in a Small Town"

Production

- Brendan O'Brien – production, keyboard on "Elderly Woman Behind the Counter in a Small Town"
- Pearl Jam – production
- Nick DiDia – recording
- Adam Kasper – assistance
- Kevin Scott – assistance
- Ames – artwork, black-and-white photography
- Lance Mercer – inside color photography
- Bob Ludwig – mastering
- Joel Zimmerman – art direction

== Charts ==
=== Weekly charts ===
Chart (1993–94)	Peak position
Australian Albums (ARIA)	1
Austrian Albums (Ö3 Austria)	7
Canada Top Albums/CDs (RPM)	1
Dutch Albums (Album Top 100)	1
Finnish Albums (Suomen virallinen lista)	3
French Albums (SNEP)	12
German Albums (Offizielle Top 100)	8
Greek Albums (Pop & Rock)	17
Hungarian Albums (MAHASZ)	34
Irish Albums (IFPI)	1
Japanese Albums (Oricon)	42
New Zealand Albums (RMNZ)	1
Norwegian Albums (VG-lista)	1
Spanish Albums (PROMUSICAE)	31
Scottish Albums (Official Charts)	70
Swedish Albums (Sverigetopplistan)	1
Swiss Albums (Schweizer Hitparade)	9
UK Albums (Official Charts)	2
US Billboard 200	1
Chart (2010)	Peak position
Italian Albums (FIMI)	84
Chart (2021)	Peak position
Portuguese Albums (AFP)	28

=== Year-end charts ===
Chart (1993)	Position
Australian Albums (ARIA)	39
Canada Top Albums/CDs (RPM)	17
Dutch Albums (Album Top 100)	51
New Zealand Albums (RMNZ)	29
UK Albums (OCC)	57
US Billboard 200	15
Chart (1994)	Position
Australian Albums (ARIA)	24
Canada Top Albums/CDs (RPM)	26
German Albums (Offizielle Top 100)	95
New Zealand Albums (RMNZ)	8
UK Albums (OCC)	126
US Billboard 200	6

=== Decade-end charts ===
Chart (1990s)	Position
US Billboard 200	46

== Certifications ==
Region	Certification	Certified units/sales
Argentina (CAPIF)	Gold	30,000^{^}
Australia (ARIA)	4× Platinum	280,000^{^}
Canada (Music Canada)	6× Platinum	600,000^{‡}
France	—	29,000
Germany	—	176,000
Japan	—	37,000
Netherlands (NVPI)	Gold	50,000^{^}
New Zealand (RMNZ)	Platinum	15,000^{^}
Norway (IFPI Norway)	Gold	25,000^{*}
Spain (Promusicae)	Gold	50,000^{^}
United Kingdom (BPI)	Gold	192,000
United States (RIAA)	7× Platinum	7,000,000^{^}
^{*} Sales figures based on certification alone.^{^} Shipments figures based on certification alone.^{‡} Sales+streaming figures based on certification alone.

== Accolades ==
Publication	Country	Accolade	Year	Rank
Entertainment Weekly	United States	"100 Best Albums from 1983 to 2008"	2008	78
Pause & Play	United States	"The 90s Top 100 Essential Albums"	1999	11
Visions	Germany	"The Most Important Albums of the 90s"	1999	46
Juice	Australia	"The 100 (+34) Greatest Albums of the 90s"	1999	14
The Movement	New Zealand	"The 101 Best Albums of the 90s"	2004	37
Loudwire	US	The Best Hard Rock Album of Each Year Since 1970	2024	1
