= 2009 in downloadable songs for the Rock Band series =

- Songs released: 435
- Packs released: 65
- Albums released: 5

The Rock Band series of music video games supports downloadable songs for the Xbox 360, PlayStation 3, and Wii versions through the consoles' respective online services. Users can download songs on a track-by-track basis, with many of the tracks also offered as part of a "song pack" or complete album at a discounted rate. These packs are available for the Wii only on Rock Band 3. Most downloadable songs are playable within every game mode, including the Band World Tour career mode. All downloadable songs released before October 26, 2010 are cross-compatible between Rock Band, Rock Band 2 and Rock Band 3, while those after only work with Rock Band 3. Certain songs deemed "suitable for all ages" by Harmonix are also available for use in Lego Rock Band.

The Wii version of Rock Band does not support downloadable content, but Rock Band 2 and Rock Band 3 do, with DLC first made available in January 2009. Songs from the back catalogue of downloadable content were released for the Wii weekly in an effort by Harmonix to provide Wii players with every previously available song.

Following the release of Rock Band 4 for the PlayStation 4 and Xbox One, all previously purchased downloadable content for Rock Band 3 and earlier is forward compatible (with the exception of any downloadable content purchased for The Beatles: Rock Band) within the same system family at no additional cost.

== List of songs released in 2009 ==
The following table lists the available songs for the Rock Band series released in 2009. All songs available in packs are also available as individual song downloads on the same date, unless otherwise noted. New songs are released on Tuesdays for Xbox Live and Thursdays for PSN, unless otherwise noted. Dates listed are the initial release of songs on Xbox Live. Starting May 20, 2008, all downloadable songs are available in both the North American and European markets, unless noted.

Some songs released before Rock Band 3 have been retrofitted to include Rock Band 3 features, including backing vocals, and the ability to buy an additional pack for Pro Guitar/Bass charts without having to buy the "RB3 Version" of the song. Certain songs have been marked "family friendly" by Harmonix; such songs released before Rock Band 3's launch on October 26, 2010, can be played in Lego Rock Band.

Starting October 26 (with The Doors), all new songs are only playable in Rock Band 3, due to a change in the file format. All songs released via downloadable content are playable in Rock Band 3, and support its new Pro Drum mode. Most songs released for Rock Band 3 include core features for keyboards, Pro Keyboards, and backing vocals in the core song, where they are appropriate. Additionally, some of these songs features charts for Pro Guitar and Bass that can also be purchased.

As of October 2009, over 800 songs have been made available as downloadable content (DLC). As of October 19, 2009, over 60 million downloadable song purchases have been made by players. The following is a list of the songs that have been released in 2009.

Song title	Artist	Year	Genre	Single / Pack name	Release date	Family Friendly	Additional Rock Band 3 Features
"Claudette" (Note: Song is no longer available for purchase.)	Roy Orbison	1965	Classic Rock	Roy Orbison 01	Jan 6, 2009	Yes	None
"In Dreams"	Roy Orbison	1963	Classic Rock	Roy Orbison 01	Jan 6, 2009	Yes	None
"Mean Woman Blues"	Roy Orbison	1963	Classic Rock	Roy Orbison 01	Jan 6, 2009	Yes	None
"Oh, Pretty Woman"	Roy Orbison	1964	Classic Rock	Roy Orbison 01	Jan 6, 2009	Yes	None
"Ooby Dooby"	Roy Orbison	1956	Classic Rock	Roy Orbison 01	Jan 6, 2009	Yes	None
"You Got It"	Roy Orbison	1989	Classic Rock	Roy Orbison 01	Jan 6, 2009	Yes	None
"Are You Gonna Go My Way"	Lenny Kravitz	1993	Rock	Lenny Kravitz 01	Jan 13, 2009	Yes	None
"Freedom Train"	Lenny Kravitz	1989	Rock	Lenny Kravitz 01	Jan 13, 2009	Yes	None
"Let Love Rule"	Lenny Kravitz	1989	Rock	Lenny Kravitz 01	Jan 13, 2009	Yes	None
"Mr. Cab Driver"	Lenny Kravitz	1989	Rock	Lenny Kravitz 01	Jan 13, 2009	Yes	None
"Megasus" (Note: Song costs US$0.99 (80 MSP/100 Wii Points).)	Megasus	2009	Metal	Single	Jan 13, 2009	No	None
"Entangled"	Honest Bob and the Factory-to-Dealer Incentives	2008	Indie Rock	Single	Jan 13, 2009	Yes	None
"Space Cowboy"	Steve Miller Band	1969	Classic Rock	Steve Miller Band 01	Jan 20, 2009	Yes	None
"Take the Money and Run"	Steve Miller Band	1976	Classic Rock	Steve Miller Band 01	Jan 20, 2009	No	None
"The Joker"	Steve Miller Band	1973	Classic Rock	Steve Miller Band 01	Jan 20, 2009	No	None
"I Stand Alone"	Godsmack	2003	Nu-Metal	Single	Jan 20, 2009	Yes	None
"Feed the Tree"	Belly	1993	Alternative	Single	Jan 20, 2009	Yes	None
"Wind Me Up"	Ghost Hounds	2008	Rock	Single	Jan 20, 2009	Yes	None
"Typical"	Mutemath	2006	Alternative	Single	Jan 20, 2009	Yes	None
"War Zone"	Rob Zombie	2008	Nu-Metal	Single	Jan 20, 2009	No	None
"Cold Rain and Snow"	Grateful Dead	1967	Classic Rock	Grateful Dead 02	Jan 27, 2009	Yes	None
"Doin' That Rag"	Grateful Dead	1969	Classic Rock	Grateful Dead 02	Jan 27, 2009	No	None
"Don't Ease Me In"	Grateful Dead	1980	Classic Rock	Grateful Dead 02	Jan 27, 2009	No	None
"Fire on the Mountain"	Grateful Dead	1978	Classic Rock	Grateful Dead 02	Jan 27, 2009	Yes	None
"Hell in a Bucket"	Grateful Dead	1987	Classic Rock	Grateful Dead 02	Jan 27, 2009	No	None
"Uncle John's Band"	Grateful Dead	1970	Classic Rock	Grateful Dead 02	Jan 27, 2009	Yes	None
"The Boys Are Back in Town" (Live)	Thin Lizzy	1977	Classic Rock	Thin Lizzy 01	Feb 3, 2009	No	None
"Cowboy Song" (Live)	Thin Lizzy	1977	Classic Rock	Thin Lizzy 01	Feb 3, 2009	Yes	None
"Jailbreak" (Live)	Thin Lizzy	1977	Classic Rock	Thin Lizzy 01	Feb 3, 2009	No	None
"Precious"	The Pretenders	1980	New Wave	Single	Feb 3, 2009	No	None
"Hit Me With Your Best Shot"	Pat Benatar	1980	Classic Rock	Single	Feb 3, 2009	Yes	None
"Break My Heart" (Note: Song is also available through a special promotion.)	Nikko	2009	Pop-Rock	Single	Feb 3, 2009	Yes	None
"Don't Tell Me"	Nikko	2009	Pop-Rock	Single	Feb 3, 2009	Yes	None
"Creepin' Up the Backstairs"	The Fratellis	2006	Alternative	The Fratellis 01	Feb 10, 2009	No	None
"Flathead"	The Fratellis	2006	Alternative	The Fratellis 01	Feb 10, 2009	No	None
"Henrietta"	The Fratellis	2006	Alternative	The Fratellis 01	Feb 10, 2009	No	None
"More Human than Human"	White Zombie	1995	Metal	Single	Feb 17, 2009	No	None
"Black Sunshine"	White Zombie	1992	Metal	Single	Feb 17, 2009	No	None
"Wasted Again"	Turbonegro	2005	Punk	Single	Feb 17, 2009	No	None
"3 Dimes Down"	Drive-By Truckers	2008	Country	Alt-Country 01	Feb 24, 2009	No	None
"Can't Let Go"	Lucinda Williams	1998	Country	Alt-Country 01	Feb 24, 2009	Yes	None
"People Got a Lotta Nerve"	Neko Case	2009	Country	Alt-Country 01	Feb 24, 2009	No	None
"Time Bomb" (Live)	Old 97's	2005	Country	Alt-Country 01	Feb 24, 2009	No	None
"Satellite Radio"	Steve Earle	2007	Country	Alt-Country 01	Feb 24, 2009	Yes	None
"Futures"	Jimmy Eat World	2004	Pop-Rock	Jimmy Eat World 01	Feb 24, 2009	Yes	None
"Lucky Denver Mint"	Jimmy Eat World	1999	Pop-Rock	Jimmy Eat World 01	Feb 24, 2009	Yes	None
"Sweetness"	Jimmy Eat World	2001	Pop-Rock	Jimmy Eat World 01	Feb 24, 2009	Yes	None
"New"	No Doubt	1999	Pop-Rock	Single	Mar 3, 2009	Yes	None
"Love Struck Baby"	Stevie Ray Vaughan and Double Trouble	1983	Blues	Texas Flood	Mar 3, 2009	Yes	None
"Pride and Joy"	Stevie Ray Vaughan and Double Trouble	1983	Blues	Texas Flood	Mar 3, 2009	Yes	Pro Guitar/Bass
"Texas Flood"	Stevie Ray Vaughan and Double Trouble	1983	Blues	Texas Flood	Mar 3, 2009	Yes	None
"Tell Me"	Stevie Ray Vaughan and Double Trouble	1983	Blues	Texas Flood	Mar 3, 2009	Yes	None
"Testify"	Stevie Ray Vaughan and Double Trouble	1983	Blues	Texas Flood	Mar 3, 2009	Yes	None
"Rude Mood"	Stevie Ray Vaughan and Double Trouble	1983	Blues	Texas Flood	Mar 3, 2009	Yes	None
"Mary Had a Little Lamb"	Stevie Ray Vaughan and Double Trouble	1983	Blues	Texas Flood	Mar 3, 2009	Yes	None
"Dirty Pool"	Stevie Ray Vaughan and Double Trouble	1983	Blues	Texas Flood	Mar 3, 2009	Yes	None
"I'm Cryin'"	Stevie Ray Vaughan and Double Trouble	1983	Blues	Texas Flood	Mar 3, 2009	Yes	None
"Lenny"	Stevie Ray Vaughan and Double Trouble	1983	Blues	Texas Flood	Mar 3, 2009	Yes	None
"All I Want"	The Offspring	1997	Punk	Single	Mar 10, 2009	Yes	None
"The Kids Aren't Alright"	The Offspring	1998	Punk	Single	Mar 10, 2009	No	None
"Losing My Religion"	R.E.M.	1991	Alternative	Single	Mar 10, 2009	Yes	None
"The Way That It Shows"	Richard Thompson	1994	Rock	Single	Mar 10, 2009	Yes	None
"Pick Up the Pieces"	Average White Band	1974	R&B/Soul/Funk	Get the Funk Out 01	Mar 17, 2009	Yes	None
"Shining Star"	Earth, Wind & Fire	1975	R&B/Soul/Funk	Get the Funk Out 01	Mar 17, 2009	Yes	None
"Get Up (I Feel Like Being a) Sex Machine - Pt 1"	James Brown	1970	R&B/Soul/Funk	Get the Funk Out 01	Mar 17, 2009	No	None
"Thrash Unreal"	Against Me!	2007	Punk	Single	Mar 17, 2009	No	None
"All the Things That Go to Make Heaven and Earth"	The New Pornographers	2007	Indie Rock	Single	Mar 17, 2009	No	None
"Use It"	The New Pornographers	2005	Indie Rock	Single	Mar 17, 2009	No	None
"Last Resort"	Papa Roach	2000	Nu-Metal	Single	Mar 17, 2009	No	None
"Lifeline"	Papa Roach	2009	Nu-Metal	Single	Mar 17, 2009	Yes	None
"Once"	Pearl Jam	1991	Grunge	Ten	Mar 24, 2009	No	None
"Even Flow"	Pearl Jam	1991	Grunge	Ten	Mar 24, 2009	Yes	Backing vocals & Pro Guitar/Bass
"Why Go"	Pearl Jam	1991	Grunge	Ten	Mar 24, 2009	Yes	Backing vocals
"Black"	Pearl Jam	1991	Grunge	Ten	Mar 24, 2009	No	Backing vocals
"Jeremy"	Pearl Jam	1991	Grunge	Ten	Mar 24, 2009	No	Backing vocals
"Oceans"	Pearl Jam	1991	Grunge	Ten	Mar 24, 2009	Yes	Backing vocals
"Porch"	Pearl Jam	1991	Grunge	Ten	Mar 24, 2009	Yes	None
"Garden"	Pearl Jam	1991	Grunge	Ten	Mar 24, 2009	Yes	Backing vocals
"Deep"	Pearl Jam	1991	Grunge	Ten	Mar 24, 2009	No	Backing vocals
"Release"	Pearl Jam	1991	Grunge	Ten	Mar 24, 2009	Yes	None
"Master/Slave"	Pearl Jam	1991	Grunge	Ten	Mar 24, 2009	Yes	None
"Don't Stop Believing"	Journey	1981	Classic Rock	Single	Mar 31, 2009	No	None
"Heartbreaker"	Pat Benatar	1979	Classic Rock	Single	Mar 31, 2009	Yes	None
"Geraldine"	Glasvegas	2008	Alternative	Single	Mar 31, 2009	Yes	None
"C'mon C'mon"	The Von Bondies	2004	Alternative	Single	Mar 31, 2009	No	None
"I Can't Keep My Eyes Off of You"	SpongeBob SquarePants	2009	Novelty	SpongeBob SquarePants 01	Mar 31, 2009	Yes	None
"The Best Day Ever"	SpongeBob SquarePants	2009	Novelty	SpongeBob SquarePants 01	Mar 31, 2009	Yes	None
"Where's Gary?"	SpongeBob SquarePants	2009	Novelty	SpongeBob SquarePants 01	Mar 31, 2009	Yes	None
"New Slang"	The Shins	2001	Indie Rock	Single	Apr 7, 2009	No	None
"Warriors of Time"	Black Tide	2008	Metal	Single	Apr 7, 2009	Yes	None
"Waking the Demon"	Bullet for My Valentine	2008	Metal	Single	Apr 7, 2009	No	None
"Beer for My Horses"	Toby Keith	2002	Country	Toby Keith 01	Apr 7, 2009	No	None
"I Love This Bar"	Toby Keith	2003	Country	Toby Keith 01	Apr 7, 2009	No	None
"She's a Hottie"	Toby Keith	2008	Country	Toby Keith 01	Apr 7, 2009	No	None
"Should've Been a Cowboy"	Toby Keith	1993	Country	Toby Keith 01	Apr 7, 2009	Yes	None
"Who's Your Daddy?"	Toby Keith	2002	Country	Toby Keith 01	Apr 7, 2009	Yes	None
"How Do You Like Me Now?!"	Toby Keith	1999	Country	Toby Keith 01	Apr 7, 2009	Yes	None
"Chinese Democracy"	Guns N' Roses	2008	Rock	Chinese Democracy	Apr 14, 2009	No	None
"Better"	Guns N' Roses	2008	Rock	Chinese Democracy	Apr 14, 2009	Yes	None
"Street of Dreams"	Guns N' Roses	2008	Rock	Chinese Democracy	Apr 14, 2009	No	None
"If the World"	Guns N' Roses	2008	Rock	Chinese Democracy	Apr 14, 2009	Yes	None
"There Was a Time"	Guns N' Roses	2008	Rock	Chinese Democracy	Apr 14, 2009	No	None
"Catcher in the Rye"	Guns N' Roses	2008	Rock	Chinese Democracy	Apr 14, 2009	Yes	None
"Scraped"	Guns N' Roses	2008	Rock	Chinese Democracy	Apr 14, 2009	Yes	None
"Riad N' the Bedouins"	Guns N' Roses	2008	Rock	Chinese Democracy	Apr 14, 2009	Yes	None
"Sorry"	Guns N' Roses	2008	Rock	Chinese Democracy	Apr 14, 2009	No	None
"I.R.S."	Guns N' Roses	2008	Rock	Chinese Democracy	Apr 14, 2009	No	None
"Madagascar"	Guns N' Roses	2008	Rock	Chinese Democracy	Apr 14, 2009	No	None
"This I Love"	Guns N' Roses	2008	Rock	Chinese Democracy	Apr 14, 2009	No	None
"Prostitute"	Guns N' Roses	2008	Rock	Chinese Democracy	Apr 14, 2009	No	None
"Ridin' the Storm Out"	REO Speedwagon	1973	Classic Rock	REO Speedwagon / Styx Tour '09	Apr 21, 2009	No	None
"Roll with the Changes"	REO Speedwagon	1978	Classic Rock	REO Speedwagon / Styx Tour '09	Apr 21, 2009	Yes	None
"Take It on the Run"	REO Speedwagon	1988	Classic Rock	REO Speedwagon / Styx Tour '09	Apr 21, 2009	No	None
"Blue Collar Man (Long Nights) (Rock Band Re-Record)"	Styx	1978	Classic Rock	REO Speedwagon / Styx Tour '09	Apr 21, 2009	Yes	None
"Renegade (Rock Band Re-Record)"	Styx	1978	Classic Rock	REO Speedwagon / Styx Tour '09	Apr 21, 2009	Yes	None
"Too Much Time on My Hands (Rock Band Re-Record)"	Styx	1981	Classic Rock	REO Speedwagon / Styx Tour '09	Apr 21, 2009	No	None
"Can't Stop Rockin'"	Styx/REO Speedwagon	2009	Classic Rock	REO Speedwagon / Styx Tour '09	Apr 21, 2009	Yes	None
"Alone in My Head"	Hautewerk	2006	Indie Rock	Hautewerk 01	Apr 21, 2009	Yes	None
"I Know Where You Came From"	Hautewerk	2006	Indie Rock	Hautewerk 01	Apr 21, 2009	Yes	None
"Stop Start Again"	Hautewerk	2006	Indie Rock	Hautewerk 01	Apr 21, 2009	Yes	None
"Up the Beach"	Jane's Addiction	1988	Alternative	Nothing's Shocking	Apr 28, 2009	Yes	None
"Ocean Size"	Jane's Addiction	1988	Alternative	Nothing's Shocking	Apr 28, 2009	Yes	None
"Had a Dad"	Jane's Addiction	1988	Alternative	Nothing's Shocking	Apr 28, 2009	No	None
"Ted, Just Admit It..."	Jane's Addiction	1988	Alternative	Nothing's Shocking	Apr 28, 2009	No	None
"Standing in the Shower... Thinking"	Jane's Addiction	1988	Alternative	Nothing's Shocking	Apr 28, 2009	No	None
"Summertime Rolls"	Jane's Addiction	1988	Alternative	Nothing's Shocking	Apr 28, 2009	No	None
"Idiots Rule"	Jane's Addiction	1988	Alternative	Nothing's Shocking	Apr 28, 2009	No	None
"Jane Says"	Jane's Addiction	1988	Alternative	Nothing's Shocking	Apr 28, 2009	No	Pro Guitar/Bass
"Thank You Boys"	Jane's Addiction	1988	Alternative	Nothing's Shocking	Apr 28, 2009	Yes	None
"Pigs in Zen"	Jane's Addiction	1988	Alternative	Nothing's Shocking	Apr 28, 2009	No	None
"Take Me Out"	Franz Ferdinand	2004	Alternative	Franz Ferdinand 01	May 5, 2009	Yes	None
"Lucid Dreams"	Franz Ferdinand	2009	Alternative	Franz Ferdinand 01	May 5, 2009	Yes	None
"Do You Want To"	Franz Ferdinand	2005	Alternative	Franz Ferdinand 01	May 5, 2009	Yes	None
"Smooth Criminal"	Alien Ant Farm	2001	Rock	Single	May 5, 2009	No	None
"Blue Sky"	The Allman Brothers Band	1972	Southern Rock	Single	May 5, 2009	Yes	None
"Midnight Rider"	The Allman Brothers Band	1970	Southern Rock	Single	May 5, 2009	Yes	None
"Drain the Blood"	The Distillers	2003	Punk	Single	May 5, 2009	No	None
"Naked Eye"	Luscious Jackson	1996	Alternative	Single	May 5, 2009	No	None
"Idealistic Types"	Prong	2007	Metal	Single	May 5, 2009	No	None
"The Banishment"	Prong	2007	Metal	Single	May 5, 2009	No	None
"Bad Luck"	Social Distortion	1992	Punk	Social Distortion 01	May 12, 2009	No	None
"Ring of Fire"	Social Distortion	1990	Punk	Social Distortion 01	May 12, 2009	Yes	None
"Story of My Life"	Social Distortion	1990	Punk	Social Distortion 01	May 12, 2009	Yes	None
"Stricken"	Disturbed	2005	Nu-Metal	Single	May 12, 2009	No	None
"Stupify"	Disturbed	2000	Nu-Metal	Single	May 12, 2009	No	None
"Black Friday"	Steely Dan	1975	Classic Rock	Single	May 12, 2009	Yes	None
"My Old School"	Steely Dan	1973	Classic Rock	Single	May 12, 2009	No	None
"Radio Radio"	Elvis Costello	1978	Rock	Single	May 12, 2009	Yes	None
"School's Out" (Live)	Alice Cooper	1995	Rock	Alice Cooper 01	May 19, 2009	Yes	None
"I'm Eighteen" (Live)	Alice Cooper	1995	Rock	Alice Cooper 01	May 19, 2009	Yes	None
"Billion Dollar Babies" (Live)	Alice Cooper	1995	Rock	Alice Cooper 01	May 19, 2009	No	None
"Poison"	Alice Cooper	1989	Rock	Alice Cooper 01	May 19, 2009	No	None
"Under My Wheels" (Live)	Alice Cooper	1995	Rock	Alice Cooper 01	May 19, 2009	Yes	None
"Vengeance is Mine"	Alice Cooper	2008	Rock	Alice Cooper 01	May 19, 2009	No	None
"Liar (It Takes One to Know One)"	Taking Back Sunday	2006	Emo	Taking Back Sunday 01	May 19, 2009	Yes	None
"MakeDamnSure"	Taking Back Sunday	2006	Emo	Taking Back Sunday 01	May 19, 2009	No	None
"What's It Feel Like to Be a Ghost?"	Taking Back Sunday	2006	Emo	Taking Back Sunday 01	May 19, 2009	No	None
"Kids Don't Follow"	The Replacements	1982	Punk	Single	May 19, 2009	No	None
"Cuz U R Next"	Ministry	2008	Metal	Ministry 01	May 26, 2009	No	None
"LiesLiesLies"	Ministry	2006	Metal	Ministry 01	May 26, 2009	No	None
"The Great Satan"	Ministry	2006	Metal	Ministry 01	May 26, 2009	No	None
"She's Not There"	The Zombies	1965	Classic Rock	Single	May 26, 2009	Yes	None
"Tell Her No"	The Zombies	1965	Classic Rock	Single	May 26, 2009	Yes	None
"Linger"	The Cranberries	1993	Alternative	Single	May 26, 2009	Yes	None
"Shimmer & Shine"	Ben Harper and Relentless7	2009	Alternative	Bonnaroo 01	Jun 2, 2009	Yes	None
"A Favor House Atlantic"	Coheed and Cambria	2004	Prog	Bonnaroo 01	Jun 2, 2009	Yes	None
"The Running Free"	Coheed and Cambria	2007	Prog	Bonnaroo 01	Jun 2, 2009	No	None
"Wilson" (Live)	Phish	1995	Rock	Bonnaroo 01	Jun 2, 2009	Yes	None
"Steady at the Wheel"	Shooter Jennings	2005	Country	Bonnaroo 01	Jun 2, 2009	Yes	None
"Wolf Like Me"	TV on the Radio	2006	Indie Rock	Bonnaroo 01	Jun 2, 2009	No	None
"Aces High" (Live)	Iron Maiden	2008	Metal	Iron Maiden 01	Jun 9, 2009	Yes	None
"2 Minutes to Midnight"	Iron Maiden	1984	Metal	Iron Maiden 01	Jun 9, 2009	No	None
"The Trooper"	Iron Maiden	1983	Metal	Iron Maiden 01	Jun 9, 2009	No	None
"Wasted Years"	Iron Maiden	1986	Metal	Iron Maiden 01	Jun 9, 2009	Yes	None
"The Number of the Beast" [Original Version]	Iron Maiden	1982	Metal	Iron Maiden 01	Jun 9, 2009	No	None
"Run to the Hills" [Original Version]	Iron Maiden	1982	Metal	Iron Maiden 01	Jun 9, 2009	No	None
"Can I Play with Madness"	Iron Maiden	1988	Metal	Iron Maiden 01	Jun 9, 2009	No	None
"The Clairvoyant"	Iron Maiden	1988	Metal	Iron Maiden 01	Jun 9, 2009	No	None
"Powerslave"	Iron Maiden	1984	Metal	Iron Maiden 01	Jun 9, 2009	No	None
"Fear of the Dark" (Live)	Iron Maiden	2008	Metal	Iron Maiden 01	Jun 9, 2009	Yes	None
"Hallowed Be Thy Name" (Live)	Iron Maiden	2008	Metal	Iron Maiden 01	Jun 9, 2009	No	None
"Iron Maiden" (Live)	Iron Maiden	2008	Metal	Iron Maiden 01	Jun 9, 2009	No	None
"Bring Me to Life"	Evanescence	2003	Nu-Metal	Evanescence 01	Jun 16, 2009	Yes	None
"Call Me When You're Sober"	Evanescence	2006	Nu-Metal	Evanescence 01	Jun 16, 2009	No	None
"Weight of the World"	Evanescence	2006	Nu-Metal	Evanescence 01	Jun 16, 2009	No	None
"Back from the Dead"	Spinal Tap	2009	Metal	Spinal Tap 01	Jun 16, 2009	No	None
"Rock 'n' Roll Nightmare"	Spinal Tap	2009	Metal	Spinal Tap 01	Jun 16, 2009	No	None
"Saucy Jack"	Spinal Tap	2009	Metal	Spinal Tap 01	Jun 16, 2009	No	None
"Warmer Than Hell"	Spinal Tap	2009	Metal	Spinal Tap 01	Jun 16, 2009	No	None
"The Downfall of Us All"	A Day to Remember	2009	Punk	Warped Tour 2009 01	Jun 23, 2009	Yes	None
"21st Century (Digital Boy)"	Bad Religion	1990	Punk	Warped Tour 2009 01	Jun 23, 2009	No	None
"I Didn't Say I Was Powerful, I Said I Was a Wizard"	Chiodos	2007	Emo	Warped Tour 2009 01	Jun 23, 2009	No	None
"The Flood"	Escape the Fate	2008	Emo	Warped Tour 2009 01	Jun 23, 2009	Yes	None
"Reinventing Your Exit"	Underoath	2004	Emo	Warped Tour 2009 01	Jun 23, 2009	Yes	None
"Little of Your Time"	Maroon 5	2007	Pop-Rock	Maroon 5 01	Jun 23, 2009	No	None
"Makes Me Wonder"	Maroon 5	2007	Pop-Rock	Maroon 5 01	Jun 23, 2009	No	None
"Wake Up Call"	Maroon 5	2007	Pop-Rock	Maroon 5 01	Jun 23, 2009	No	None
"Brother"	Pearl Jam	2009	Grunge	Ten Bonus Pack	Jun 23, 2009	No	Backing vocals
"Alive" (Live: Drop in the Park)	Pearl Jam	2009	Grunge	Ten Bonus Pack	Jun 23, 2009	No	None
"State of Love and Trust" (Live: Drop in the Park)	Pearl Jam	2009	Grunge	Ten Bonus Pack	Jun 23, 2009	No	None
"Blue Morning, Blue Day"	Foreigner	1978	Classic Rock	Foreigner 01	Jun 30, 2009	Yes	None
"Feels Like the First Time"	Foreigner	1979	Classic Rock	Foreigner 01	Jun 30, 2009	Yes	None
"Headknocker"	Foreigner	1977	Classic Rock	Foreigner 01	Jun 30, 2009	Yes	None
"Weapon of Choice"	Black Rebel Motorcycle Club	2007	Alternative	Single	Jun 30, 2009	Yes	None
"Sweet Talk"	Dear and the Headlights	2007	Indie Rock	Warped Tour 2009 02	Jun 30, 2009	Yes	None
"Hey John, What's Your Name Again?"	The Devil Wears Prada	2007	Metal	Warped Tour 2009 02	Jun 30, 2009	No	None
"Image of the Invisible"	Thrice	2005	Rock	Warped Tour 2009 02	Jun 30, 2009	Yes	None
"21 Guns" (Note: Song is also available as part of "21st Century Breakdown" (released Nov. 13, 2012).)	Green Day	2009	Rock	Green Day 01	Jul 7, 2009	No	Backing vocals
"East Jesus Nowhere"	Green Day	2009	Rock	Green Day 01	Jul 7, 2009	No	Backing vocals
"Know Your Enemy"	Green Day	2009	Rock	Green Day 01	Jul 7, 2009	No	Backing vocals
"Conquer All"	Behemoth	2004	Metal	Mayhem Tour 2009	Jul 7, 2009	No	None
"What a Horrible Night to Have a Curse"	The Black Dahlia Murder	2007	Metal	Mayhem Tour 2009	Jul 7, 2009	No	None
"Hammer Smashed Face"	Cannibal Corpse	1992	Metal	Mayhem Tour 2009	Jul 7, 2009	No	None
"Empire of the Gun"	God Forbid	2009	Metal	Mayhem Tour 2009	Jul 7, 2009	No	None
"Embedded"	Job for a Cowboy	2007	Metal	Mayhem Tour 2009	Jul 7, 2009	No	None
"Disposable Teens"	Marilyn Manson	2000	Metal	Mayhem Tour 2009	Jul 7, 2009	No	None
"Black Magic"	Slayer	1983	Metal	Mayhem Tour 2009	Jul 7, 2009	No	None
"This Is Exile"	Whitechapel	2008	Metal	Mayhem Tour 2009	Jul 7, 2009	No	None
"All Going Out Together"	Big Dipper	1987	Indie Rock	Big Dipper 01	Jul 14, 2009	Yes	None
"She's Fetching"	Big Dipper	1987	Indie Rock	Big Dipper 01	Jul 14, 2009	Yes	None
"Younger Bums"	Big Dipper	1987	Indie Rock	Big Dipper 01	Jul 14, 2009	No	None
"Dissident Aggressor" (Live)	Judas Priest	2009	Metal	Judas Priest 01	Jul 14, 2009	No	None
"Eat Me Alive" (Live)	Judas Priest	2009	Metal	Judas Priest 01	Jul 14, 2009	No	None
"Prophecy" (Live)	Judas Priest	2009	Metal	Judas Priest 01	Jul 14, 2009	No	None
"Hang You from the Heavens"	The Dead Weather	2009	Alternative	The Dead Weather 01	Jul 14, 2009	No	None
"No Hassle Night"	The Dead Weather	2009	Alternative	The Dead Weather 01	Jul 14, 2009	Yes	None
"Treat Me Like Your Mother"	The Dead Weather	2009	Alternative	The Dead Weather 01	Jul 14, 2009	Yes	None
"Crawl"	Kings of Leon	2008	Rock	Kings of Leon 01	Jul 21, 2009	No	None
"Molly's Chambers"	Kings of Leon	2003	Rock	Kings of Leon 01	Jul 21, 2009	No	None
"Sex on Fire"	Kings of Leon	2008	Rock	Kings of Leon 01	Jul 21, 2009	No	None
"Last One to Die"	Rancid	2009	Punk	Rancid 01	Jul 21, 2009	No	None
"Ruby Soho"	Rancid	1995	Punk	Rancid 01	Jul 21, 2009	Yes	None
"Time Bomb"	Rancid	1995	Punk	Rancid 01	Jul 21, 2009	No	None
"Prayer of the Refugee"	Rise Against	2006	Punk	Rise Against 01	Jul 21, 2009	Yes	None
"Re-Education (Through Labor)"	Rise Against	2008	Punk	Rise Against 01	Jul 21, 2009	Yes	None
"Savior"	Rise Against	2008	Punk	Rise Against 01	Jul 21, 2009	Yes	None
"Sweetness & Light"	Lush	1990	Alternative	Single	Jul 21, 2009	Yes	None
"Down"	Blink-182	2003	Punk	Blink-182 01	Jul 28, 2009	Yes	None
"Feeling This"	Blink-182	2003	Punk	Blink-182 01	Jul 28, 2009	No	None
"The Rock Show"	Blink-182	2001	Punk	Blink-182 01	Jul 28, 2009	No	None
"100,000 Years" (Live)	Kiss	1975	Classic Rock	Kiss 01	Jul 28, 2009	No	None
"Deuce" (Live)	Kiss	1975	Classic Rock	Kiss 01	Jul 28, 2009	No	None
"Parasite" (Live)	Kiss	1975	Classic Rock	Kiss 01	Jul 28, 2009	Yes	None
"My Name Is Jonas"	Weezer	1994	Alternative	Weezer 02	Jul 28, 2009	Yes	None
"Pork and Beans"	Weezer	2008	Alternative	Weezer 02	Jul 28, 2009	Yes	None
"Undone - The Sweater Song"	Weezer	1994	Alternative	Weezer 02	Jul 28, 2009	No	None
"Out Here All Night"	Damone	2006	Rock	Single	Jul 28, 2009	Yes	None
"(Funky) Sex Farm"	Spinal Tap	2009	Metal	Spinal Tap's Tap Ten	Aug 4, 2009	No	None
"(Listen to the) Flower People (Reggae Stylee)"	Spinal Tap	2009	Metal	Spinal Tap's Tap Ten	Aug 4, 2009	Yes	None
"America"	Spinal Tap	2009	Metal	Spinal Tap's Tap Ten	Aug 4, 2009	No	None
"Big Bottom"	Spinal Tap	2009	Metal	Spinal Tap's Tap Ten	Aug 4, 2009	No	None
"Cups and Cakes"	Spinal Tap	2009	Metal	Spinal Tap's Tap Ten	Aug 4, 2009	Yes	None
"Gimme Some Money"	Spinal Tap	2009	Metal	Spinal Tap's Tap Ten	Aug 4, 2009	No	None
"Heavy Duty"	Spinal Tap	2009	Metal	Spinal Tap's Tap Ten	Aug 4, 2009	Yes	None
"Hell Hole"	Spinal Tap	2009	Metal	Spinal Tap's Tap Ten	Aug 4, 2009	No	None
"Rock 'n' Roll Creation"	Spinal Tap	2009	Metal	Spinal Tap's Tap Ten	Aug 4, 2009	Yes	None
"Stonehenge"	Spinal Tap	2009	Metal	Spinal Tap's Tap Ten	Aug 4, 2009	No	None
"Tonight I'm Gonna Rock You Tonight"	Spinal Tap	2009	Metal	Spinal Tap's Tap Ten	Aug 4, 2009	No	None
"Clint Eastwood"	Gorillaz	2001	Hip-Hop/Rap	Gorillaz 01	Aug 11, 2009	No	None
"Feel Good Inc."	Gorillaz	2005	Hip-Hop/Rap	Gorillaz 01	Aug 11, 2009	No	None
"Re-Hash"	Gorillaz	2001	Hip-Hop/Rap	Gorillaz 01	Aug 11, 2009	No	None
"Piece of My Heart"	Janis Joplin	1968	Classic Rock	Single	Aug 11, 2009	Yes	None
"Chest Fever" (Live)	The Band	1972	Classic Rock	Single	Aug 11, 2009	No	None
"White Rabbit"	Jefferson Airplane	1967	Classic Rock	Single	Aug 11, 2009	No	None
"Magic Bus" (Live at Leeds)	The Who	1970	Classic Rock	Single	Aug 11, 2009	No	None
"No Rain"	Blind Melon	1992	Alternative	Single	Aug 18, 2009	No	None
"There's No Other Way"	Blur	1991	Alternative	Single	Aug 18, 2009	No	None
"I'm Shipping Up to Boston"	Dropkick Murphys	2005	Punk	Single	Aug 18, 2009	No	None
"Inside Out"	Eve 6	1998	Alternative	Single	Aug 18, 2009	No	Pro Guitar/Bass
"I Predict a Riot"	Kaiser Chiefs	2005	Indie Rock	Single	Aug 18, 2009	No	None
"All My Life"	Foo Fighters	2002	Alternative	Foo Fighters 02	Aug 18, 2009	No	None
"I'll Stick Around"	Foo Fighters	1995	Alternative	Foo Fighters 02	Aug 18, 2009	No	None
"Lonely as You"	Foo Fighters	2002	Alternative	Foo Fighters 02	Aug 18, 2009	No	None
"Mony Mony"	Billy Idol	1981	Rock	Single	Aug 25, 2009	No	None
"Rebel Yell"	Billy Idol	1983	Rock	Single	Aug 25, 2009	No	None
"Don't Stop"	Fleetwood Mac	1977	Classic Rock	Single	Aug 25, 2009	Yes	None
"World Turning"	Fleetwood Mac	1975	Classic Rock	Single	Aug 25, 2009	Yes	None
"She's a Genius"	Jet	2009	Rock	Single	Aug 25, 2009	No	None
"I Won't Back Down"	Tom Petty	1989	Rock	Single	Aug 25, 2009	Yes	None
"Runnin' Down a Dream"	Tom Petty	1989	Rock	Single	Aug 25, 2009	Yes	None
"Bat Country"	Avenged Sevenfold	2005	Metal	Single	Sep 1, 2009	No	None
"Town Called Malice"	The Jam	1982	New Wave	Single	Sep 1, 2009	No	None
"Going Underground"	The Jam	1980	New Wave	Single	Sep 1, 2009	Yes	None
"Supersonic" (Live)	Oasis	1994	Rock	Single	Sep 1, 2009	No	None
"Guerrilla Radio"	Rage Against the Machine	1999	Alternative	Single	Sep 1, 2009	No	None
"And She Was"	Talking Heads	1985	New Wave	Talking Heads 01	Sep 1, 2009	Yes	None
"Crosseyed and Painless"	Talking Heads	1980	New Wave	Talking Heads 01	Sep 1, 2009	Yes	None
"Girlfriend Is Better"	Talking Heads	1983	New Wave	Talking Heads 01	Sep 1, 2009	Yes	None
"Once in a Lifetime"	Talking Heads	1980	New Wave	Talking Heads 01	Sep 1, 2009	No	None
"Take Me to the River"	Talking Heads	1978	New Wave	Talking Heads 01	Sep 1, 2009	No	None
"Less Talk More Rokk"	Freezepop	2007	Pop/Dance/Electronic	Freezepop 01	Sep 8, 2009	No	None
"Get Ready 2 Rokk"	Freezepop	2000	Pop/Dance/Electronic	Freezepop 01	Sep 8, 2009	Yes	None
"Science Genius Girl"	Freezepop	2000	Pop/Dance/Electronic	Freezepop 01	Sep 8, 2009	Yes	None
"Re: Your Brains"	Jonathan Coulton	2006	Pop-Rock	The PAX 2009 Collection	Sep 8, 2009	No	None
"Origin of Species"	MC Frontalot	2007	Hip-Hop/Rap	The PAX 2009 Collection	Sep 8, 2009	No	None
"Opening Band"	Paul and Storm	2005	Pop-Rock	The PAX 2009 Collection	Sep 8, 2009	No	None
"Kryptonite"	3 Doors Down	2000	Rock	Single	Sep 8, 2009	Yes	None
"Miss Murder"	AFI	2006	Emo	Single	Sep 8, 2009	No	None
"Gasoline"	Audioslave	2002	Rock	Single	Sep 8, 2009	No	None
"ABC"	Jackson 5	1970	Pop-Rock	Single	Sep 8, 2009	Yes	None
"666" (Rock Band Re-Record)	Anvil	1982	Metal	Anvil 01	Sep 15, 2009	No	None
"Metal on Metal" (Rock Band Re-Record)	Anvil	1982	Metal	Anvil 01	Sep 15, 2009	No	None
"This is Thirteen"	Anvil	2007	Metal	Anvil 01	Sep 15, 2009	No	None
"Pick Me Up"	Dinosaur Jr.	2007	Alternative	Single	Sep 15, 2009	Yes	None
"The Wagon"	Dinosaur Jr.	1991	Alternative	Single	Sep 15, 2009	No	None
"Hand Me Down World"	The Guess Who	1970	Classic Rock	Single	Sep 15, 2009	Yes	None
"No Time"	The Guess Who	1970	Classic Rock	Single	Sep 15, 2009	Yes	None
"Rock Your Socks"	Tenacious D	2001	Rock	Single	Sep 15, 2009	No	None
"Tribute"	Tenacious D	2001	Rock	Single	Sep 15, 2009	No	None
"Gonna See My Friend"	Pearl Jam	2009	Grunge	Backspacer	Sep 20, 2009	No	Backing vocals
"Got Some"	Pearl Jam	2009	Grunge	Backspacer	Sep 20, 2009	No	Backing vocals
"The Fixer"	Pearl Jam	2009	Grunge	Backspacer	Sep 20, 2009	Yes	Backing vocals
"Johnny Guitar"	Pearl Jam	2009	Grunge	Backspacer	Sep 20, 2009	No	Backing vocals
"Just Breathe"	Pearl Jam	2009	Grunge	Backspacer	Sep 20, 2009	No	Backing vocals
"Amongst the Waves"	Pearl Jam	2009	Grunge	Backspacer	Sep 20, 2009	No	None
"Unthought Known"	Pearl Jam	2009	Grunge	Backspacer	Sep 20, 2009	Yes	Backing vocals
"Supersonic"	Pearl Jam	2009	Grunge	Backspacer	Sep 20, 2009	No	Backing vocals
"Speed of Sound"	Pearl Jam	2009	Grunge	Backspacer	Sep 20, 2009	Yes	Backing vocals
"Force of Nature"	Pearl Jam	2009	Grunge	Backspacer	Sep 20, 2009	No	None
"The End"	Pearl Jam	2009	Grunge	Backspacer	Sep 20, 2009	No	None
"A Looking in View"	Alice in Chains	2009	Grunge	Alice in Chains 01	Sep 29, 2009	No	None
"Check My Brain"	Alice in Chains	2009	Grunge	Alice in Chains 01	Sep 29, 2009	Yes	None
"No Excuses"	Alice in Chains	1994	Grunge	Alice in Chains 01	Sep 29, 2009	Yes	None
"Rooster"	Alice in Chains	1992	Grunge	Alice in Chains 01	Sep 29, 2009	No	Pro Guitar/Bass
"Would?"	Alice in Chains	1992	Grunge	Alice in Chains 01	Sep 29, 2009	No	None
"I Will Not Bow"	Breaking Benjamin	2009	Rock	Breaking Benjamin 01	Sep 29, 2009	No	None
"So Cold"	Breaking Benjamin	2004	Rock	Breaking Benjamin 01	Sep 29, 2009	No	None
"The Diary of Jane"	Breaking Benjamin	2006	Rock	Breaking Benjamin 01	Sep 29, 2009	Yes	None
"U Suck"	Just Kait	2009	Rock	Single	Sep 29, 2009	No	None
"Hey Dude"	Kula Shaker	1996	Alternative	Single	Sep 29, 2009	No	None
"Knight on the Town"	Kula Shaker	1996	Alternative	Single	Sep 29, 2009	Yes	None
"Many Shades of Black"	The Raconteurs	2008	Rock	The Raconteurs 01	Oct 6, 2009	Yes	None
"Salute Your Solution"	The Raconteurs	2008	Rock	The Raconteurs 01	Oct 6, 2009	Yes	None
"Steady, As She Goes"	The Raconteurs	2006	Rock	The Raconteurs 01	Oct 6, 2009	Yes	None
"Dance Epidemic"	Electric Six	2006	Rock	Electric Six 01	Oct 6, 2009	No	None
"Gay Bar"	Electric Six	2003	Rock	Electric Six 01	Oct 6, 2009	No	None
"I Don't Like You"	Electric Six	2007	Rock	Electric Six 01	Oct 6, 2009	Yes	None
"Head Over Feet"	Alanis Morissette	1995	Alternative	Single	Oct 6, 2009	Yes	None
"Ironic"	Alanis Morissette	1995	Alternative	Single	Oct 6, 2009	No	None
"Handlebars"	Flobots	2008	Hip-Hop/Rap	Single	Oct 6, 2009	No	None
"(We Are) The Road Crew '08"	Motörhead	1980	Metal	Brütal Legend	Oct 13, 2009	No	None
"The Metal"	Tenacious D	2006	Rock	Brütal Legend	Oct 13, 2009	Yes	None
"More Than Meets the Eye"	Testament	2008	Metal	Brütal Legend	Oct 13, 2009	No	None
"Show Me the Way"	Black Tide	2008	Metal	Single	Oct 13, 2009	Yes	None
"What's My Age Again?"	Blink-182	1999	Punk	Single	Oct 13, 2009	No	None
"Satch Boogie"	Joe Satriani	1987	Rock	Single	Oct 13, 2009	Yes	None
"Surfing with the Alien"	Joe Satriani	1987	Rock	Single	Oct 13, 2009	Yes	None
"Icarus - Borne on Wings of Steel" (Live)	Kansas	1978	Prog	Single	Oct 13, 2009	Yes	None
"Point of Know Return" (Live)	Kansas	1978	Prog	Single	Oct 13, 2009	Yes	None
"Andres"	L7	1994	Grunge	Single	Oct 13, 2009	No	None
"Another One Bites the Dust"	Queen	1980	Classic Rock	Queen 01	Oct 20, 2009	No	None
"Crazy Little Thing Called Love"	Queen	1980	Classic Rock	Queen 01	Oct 20, 2009	Yes	None
"One Vision"	Queen	1986	Classic Rock	Queen 01	Oct 20, 2009	No	Pro Guitar/Bass
"Fat Bottomed Girls"	Queen	1978	Classic Rock	Queen 01	Oct 20, 2009	Yes	None
"I Want It All"	Queen	1989	Classic Rock	Queen 01	Oct 20, 2009	Yes	Pro Guitar/Bass
"I Want to Break Free"	Queen	1984	Classic Rock	Queen 01	Oct 20, 2009	No	Pro Guitar/Bass
"Killer Queen"	Queen	1974	Classic Rock	Queen 01	Oct 20, 2009	No	Pro Guitar/Bass
"Somebody to Love"	Queen	1976	Classic Rock	Queen 01	Oct 20, 2009	No	Pro Guitar/Bass
"Tie Your Mother Down"	Queen	1976	Classic Rock	Queen 01	Oct 20, 2009	No	None
"Under Pressure"	Queen	1983	Classic Rock	Queen 01	Oct 20, 2009	Yes	Pro Guitar/Bass
"Dragula"	Rob Zombie	1998	Nu-Metal	Rob Zombie 01	Oct 27, 2009	No	None
"Burn"	Rob Zombie	2009	Nu-Metal	Rob Zombie 01	Oct 27, 2009	No	None
"Superbeast"	Rob Zombie	1998	Nu-Metal	Rob Zombie 01	Oct 27, 2009	No	None
"White Unicorn"	Wolfmother	2005	Rock	Wolfmother 01	Oct 27, 2009	No	None
"New Moon Rising"	Wolfmother	2009	Rock	Wolfmother 01	Oct 27, 2009	Yes	None
"Pilgrim"	Wolfmother	2009	Rock	Wolfmother 01	Oct 27, 2009	Yes	None
"Sundial"	Wolfmother	2009	Rock	Wolfmother 01	Oct 27, 2009	Yes	None
"Woman"	Wolfmother	2005	Rock	Wolfmother 01	Oct 27, 2009	Yes	None
"Rock Me"	Liz Phair	2003	Pop-Rock	Single	Oct 27, 2009	No	None
"Best of Me"	Morningwood	2009	Pop-Rock	Single	Oct 27, 2009	Yes	None
"Sugarbaby"	Morningwood	2009	Pop-Rock	Single	Oct 27, 2009	No	None
"Best of You"	Foo Fighters	2005	Alternative	Foo Fighters 03	Nov 3, 2009	Yes	None
"The Pretender"	Foo Fighters	2007	Alternative	Foo Fighters 03	Nov 3, 2009	Yes	Pro Guitar/Bass
"Wheels"	Foo Fighters	2009	Alternative	Foo Fighters 03	Nov 3, 2009	Yes	None
"Word Forward"	Foo Fighters	2009	Alternative	Foo Fighters 03	Nov 3, 2009	Yes	None
"About a Girl"	Nirvana	1989	Grunge	Nirvana Bleach	Nov 3, 2009	Yes	None
"Blew"	Nirvana	1989	Grunge	Nirvana Bleach	Nov 3, 2009	Yes	None
"School"	Nirvana	1989	Grunge	Nirvana Bleach	Nov 3, 2009	Yes	None
"Fake Friends"	Joan Jett & The Blackhearts	1983	Punk	Single	Nov 3, 2009	Yes	None
"A Day Like This"	SpongeBob SquarePants	2009	Novelty	SpongeBob SquarePants 02	Nov 10, 2009	Yes	None
"Employee of the Month"	SpongeBob SquarePants	2006	Novelty	SpongeBob SquarePants 02	Nov 10, 2009	Yes	None
"Ridin' the Hook"	SpongeBob SquarePants	2006	Novelty	SpongeBob SquarePants 02	Nov 10, 2009	Yes	None
"Dead Leaves and the Dirty Ground"	The White Stripes	2001	Rock	The White Stripes 01	Nov 10, 2009	Yes	Pro Guitar/Bass
"Girl, You Have No Faith in Medicine"	The White Stripes	2003	Rock	The White Stripes 01	Nov 10, 2009	Yes	None
"Icky Thump"	The White Stripes	2007	Rock	The White Stripes 01	Nov 10, 2009	No	None
"Smash It Up (Part II)"	The Damned	1979	Punk	Single	Nov 10, 2009	Yes	None
"Club Foot"	Kasabian	2004	Indie Rock	Single	Nov 10, 2009	Yes	None
"Beautiful Thieves"	AFI	2009	Emo	AFI 01	Nov 17, 2009	No	None
"End Transmission"	AFI	2009	Emo	AFI 01	Nov 17, 2009	No	None
"Love Like Winter"	AFI	2006	Emo	AFI 01	Nov 17, 2009	No	None
"Medicate"	AFI	2009	Emo	AFI 01	Nov 17, 2009	No	None
"The Leaving Song Pt. II"	AFI	2003	Emo	AFI 01	Nov 17, 2009	No	None
"Walk Like An Egyptian"	The Bangles	1986	Rock	Single	Nov 17, 2009	Yes	None
"New Fang"	Them Crooked Vultures	2009	Rock	Single	Nov 17, 2009	Yes	None
"A Thing About You" (Live)	Tom Petty and the Heartbreakers	2009	Rock	Tom Petty & the Heartbreakers Live Anthology 01	Nov 24, 2009	Yes	None
"American Girl" (Live)	Tom Petty and the Heartbreakers	2009	Rock	Tom Petty & the Heartbreakers Live Anthology 01	Nov 24, 2009	No	None
"Even the Losers" (Live)	Tom Petty and the Heartbreakers	2009	Rock	Tom Petty & the Heartbreakers Live Anthology 01	Nov 24, 2009	No	None
"Here Comes My Girl" (Live)	Tom Petty and the Heartbreakers	2009	Rock	Tom Petty & the Heartbreakers Live Anthology 01	Nov 24, 2009	Yes	None
"Mary Jane's Last Dance" (Live)	Tom Petty and the Heartbreakers	2009	Rock	Tom Petty & the Heartbreakers Live Anthology 01	Nov 24, 2009	No	None
"Refugee" (Live)	Tom Petty and the Heartbreakers	2009	Rock	Tom Petty & the Heartbreakers Live Anthology 01	Nov 24, 2009	Yes	None
"Miss Independent"	Kelly Clarkson	2003	Pop/Dance/Electronic	Single	Nov 24, 2009	Yes	None
"Who Knew"	P!nk	2006	Pop-Rock	Single	Nov 24, 2009	Yes	None
"Our Lips Are Sealed"	The Go-Go's	1981	Pop-Rock	Single	Nov 24, 2009	Yes	None
"Come As You Are" (Live from MTV Unplugged)	Nirvana	1994	Grunge	Nirvana 02	Dec 1, 2009	Yes	Pro Guitar/Bass
"Lithium" (Live at Reading)	Nirvana	1991	Grunge	Nirvana 02	Dec 1, 2009	No	Pro Guitar/Bass
"Smells Like Teen Spirit"	Nirvana	1991	Grunge	Nirvana 02	Dec 1, 2009	No	Pro Guitar/Bass
"(You Can Still) Rock in America (Rock Band Re-Record)"	Night Ranger	1983	Rock	Night Ranger 01	Dec 1, 2009	Yes	None
"Don't Tell Me You Love Me (Rock Band Re-Record)"	Night Ranger	1982	Rock	Night Ranger 01	Dec 1, 2009	Yes	None
"You're Gonna Hear From Me"	Night Ranger	2008	Rock	Night Ranger 01	Dec 1, 2009	Yes	None
"Duality"	Slipknot	2004	Nu-Metal	Slipknot 01	Dec 8, 2009	No	None
"Psychosocial"	Slipknot	2008	Nu-Metal	Slipknot 01	Dec 8, 2009	No	None
"Sulfur"	Slipknot	2008	Nu-Metal	Slipknot 01	Dec 8, 2009	No	None
"I Am a Rock"	Simon & Garfunkel	1966	Classic Rock	Single	Dec 8, 2009	Yes	None
"The Sounds of Silence"	Simon & Garfunkel	1966	Classic Rock	Single	Dec 8, 2009	Yes	None
"Dreaming of Love" (Note: Song is available at no cost.) (Note: Song is not available for the Wii platform.)	Lights Resolve	2009	Indie Rock	Single	Dec 8, 2009	Yes	None
"Christian's Inferno"	Green Day	2009	Rock	Green Day 02	Dec 15, 2009	No	Backing vocals
"Last of the American Girls"	Green Day	2009	Rock	Green Day 02	Dec 15, 2009	Yes	Backing vocals
"¡Viva la Gloria!"	Green Day	2009	Rock	Green Day 02	Dec 15, 2009	Yes	Backing vocals
"Kings and Queens"	30 Seconds to Mars	2009	Emo	Single	Dec 15, 2009	No	None
"This Is War"	30 Seconds to Mars	2009	Emo	Single	Dec 15, 2009	No	None
"Gives You Hell"	All-American Rejects	2008	Emo	Single	Dec 15, 2009	No	None
"(If You're Wondering If I Want You To) I Want You To"	Weezer	2009	Alternative	Weezer 03	Dec 22, 2009	Yes	None
"Beverly Hills"	Weezer	2005	Alternative	Weezer 03	Dec 22, 2009	No	None
"Let It All Hang Out"	Weezer	2009	Alternative	Weezer 03	Dec 22, 2009	No	None
"Build a Bridge"	Limp Bizkit	2003	Nu-Metal	Single	Dec 22, 2009	Yes	None
"A Lot Like Me"	The Offspring	2008	Punk	Single	Dec 22, 2009	Yes	None
"Ocean Avenue"	Yellowcard	2003	Emo	Single	Dec 22, 2009	Yes	None
"Any Man of Mine"	Shania Twain	1995	Country	Going Country 02	Dec 29, 2009	No	None
"Cry Lonely"	Cross Canadian Ragweed	2007	Country	Going Country 02	Dec 29, 2009	No	None
"Good Time"	Alan Jackson	2008	Country	Going Country 02	Dec 29, 2009	No	None
"I Told You So"	Keith Urban	2006	Country	Going Country 02	Dec 29, 2009	No	None
"She's Country"	Jason Aldean	2009	Country	Going Country 02	Dec 29, 2009	No	None
"The Gambler"	Kenny Rogers	1978	Country	Going Country 02	Dec 29, 2009	No	None
"This One's for the Girls"	Martina McBride	2003	Country	Going Country 02	Dec 29, 2009	No	None

== Promotions ==
- Beginning on March 24, 2009, Best Buy customers who purchased the specially-marked deluxe editions of Pearl Jam's Ten, received a promotional code that could be redeemed to download two additional live tracks ("Alive" and "State of Love & Trust"), as well as a studio version of "Brother". These songs were released to the XBLM and PSN during the week of June 22, 2009. They were released for the Wii the following week.
- Beginning March 31, 2009, Rock Band owners who purchased specially-marked copies of Spectacular! on DVD received promotional codes which could be redeemed to download the songs "Break My Heart" and "Don't Tell Me" from the film's soundtrack.
- On September 20, 2009, Target began offering a special edition of Pearl Jam's Backspacer which included a copy of the album for use in Rock Band games. Backspacer was added to the in-game music store for Xbox 360 on the same day, with the Wii and PlayStation 3 receiving the content on their respective regularly scheduled days.
- On October 13, 2009, Best Buy began offering a limited edition of Brütal Legend which included a code to redeem for the Brütal Legend Track Pack for use in the Rock Band series. The song pack was released to the Rock Band Music Store on the same day.
