= Live in NYC 12/31/92 =

Live album by Pearl Jam
- Released: May 2, 2006
- Recorded: December 31, 1992, The Academy Theater, New York City, New York, United States
- Genre: Grunge
- Length: 53:40
- Language: English
- Label: Ten Club

Pearl Jam live albums chronology
| Live at Benaroya Hall (2004) | Live in NYC 12/31/92 (2006) | Live at Easy Street (2006) |

Live in NYC 12/31/92 is a limited edition live album by the American alternative rock band Pearl Jam, sent out to those who pre-ordered the 2006 album Pearl Jam before a certain date through the band's official website.

== Overview ==
Live in NYC 12/31/92 features the band's 1992 New Year's Eve performance at The Academy Theater in New York City. The show featured a fast version of "Wash", which was never played live again. "Stranglehold" (a Ted Nugent cover) was played at the show but not released on the bootleg. An early version of "Daughter" is also heard, featuring different lyrics than the version that would ultimately wind up on Vs.

Though this is an official bootleg, the quality is similar to that of common bootlegs, because the band used DAT recorders until the middle of 1992. Another archival show, the November 30, 1993 concert in Las Vegas, Nevada, was released in 2006 as a digital bootleg available from the band's official website.

The live versions of "Why Go", "Even Flow", "Alone", and "Garden" from this album were included as bonus tracks on the iTunes version of the 2009 Ten reissue, also known as the Legacy edition. They are taken directly from this album.

== Track listing ==
1. "Speed Wash" (Jeff Ament, Stone Gossard, Dave Krusen, Mike McCready, Eddie Vedder) – 3:55
  - A fast version of "Wash".
2. "Sonic Reducer" (Gene O'Connor, David Thomas) – 4:04
3. "Why Go" (Vedder, Ament) – 4:01
4. "Even Flow" (Vedder, Gossard) – 5:10
5. "Alone" (Dave Abbruzzese, Ament, Gossard, McCready, Vedder) – 3:27
6. "Garden" featuring portions of "Jeremy" (Vedder, Gossard, Ament) – 6:04
7. "Daughter" (Abbruzzese, Ament, Gossard, McCready, Vedder) – 3:56
8. "Dirty Frank" (Abbruzzese, Ament, Gossard, McCready, Vedder) – 4:05
9. "Oceans" (Vedder, Gossard, Ament) – 3:36
10. "Alive" (Vedder, Gossard) – 5:49
11. "Leash" (Abbruzzese, Ament, Gossard, McCready, Vedder) – 2:49
12. "Porch" featuring portions of "Grinder" by Judas Priest (Vedder) – 6:44

== Personnel ==
- Dave Abbruzzese – drums
- Jeff Ament – bass guitar
- Stone Gossard – guitars
- Mike McCready – guitars
- Eddie Vedder – vocals
