= Josh Taft =

American music video director

- Education: New York University
- Occupation: Music video director

Josh Taft (1965-2025) was an American music video director. He has directed music videos for Alice in Chains ("Would?"), Stone Temple Pilots ("Sex Type Thing", "Plush", and "Lady Picture Show"), Nas ("The World Is Yours"), A Tribe Called Quest ("Award Tour", "Electric Relaxation" and "Oh My God"), Cypress Hill ("Insane in the Brain"), Mother Love Bone ("Stardog Champion"), Pearl Jam ("Alive", "Even Flow", and "Oceans"), Mad Season ("River of Deceit"), and Fuel ("Shimmer").

After graduating from NYU Film School in 1989, Taft returned to his hometown of Seattle, Washington where he began shooting grassroots videos for his musician friends, including members of Mother Love Bone (the predecessor to Pearl Jam) and Soundgarden.

After forming his own company, Cowboy Films, Taft followed with videos for other alternative acts such as Stone Temple Pilots and Alice in Chains. He received several MTV Video Music Awards and Billboard Awards for his work.

Taft then made the move to commercial directing with spots for clients such as Adidas, Reebok, Nike, Energizer, Sprite and Nissan Xterra. In 2003, he won a Lion Award at the Cannes Festival for his Nike "Stickman Basketball" advertisement and later received a second award for his Coca-Cola "Round The Fire" advertisements. He was a "Gold" Clio Award winner in 2004 for his Nike "Frisbee," "Hoops," and "Football" spots.

Taft directed the documentary film ALIVE & WELL (2013), which profiled seven individuals affected by Huntington's disease. ALIVE & WELL premiered at the Seattle International Film Festival in May 2013.
