= Brother (Pearl Jam song) =

Song by Pearl Jam

from the album Lost Dogs
- Released: November 11, 2003
- Recorded: March 27 – April 26, 1991 at London Bridge Studios, Seattle, Washington; guitar overdubs recorded in 2003 (Lost Dogs version); March 27 – April 26, 1991 at London Bridge Studios, Seattle, Washington (Ten reissue version)
- Genre: Alternative rock, grunge
- Length: 3:47
- Label: Epic
- Songwriters: Stone Gossard (Lost Dogs version); Eddie Vedder, Stone Gossard (Ten reissue version)
- Producer: Rick Parashar

"Brother" is a song by American rock band Pearl Jam. Featuring lyrics written by vocalist Eddie Vedder and music written by guitarist Stone Gossard, "Brother" was an outtake from the band's debut album, Ten. An instrumental version of the song was included on the 2003 B-sides and rarities album, Lost Dogs. The version of "Brother" with vocals appears on the 2009 Ten reissue. The version of the song with vocals was released to radio in 2009; however, a commercial single was not released. The song topped the Billboard Modern Rock Tracks chart, where it spent two weeks at number one.

== Origin and recording ==
The original version of "Brother" features lyrics written by vocalist Eddie Vedder and music written by guitarist Stone Gossard. A version of "Brother" with vocals appears on the 2009 Ten reissue, while an alternate vocal version circulated among fans for years on the Epic Rough Mixes 4/26/91 promo cassette that was released as a bootleg and later on the 2004 Epic in-house disc labelled Rarities Unreleased Cuts that leaked onto the internet.

While the band was working on Ten, the song became a point of contention between Gossard and bassist Jeff Ament. In a story described in the liner notes of the Lost Dogs album, Gossard decided he was no longer interested in playing the guitar riff which almost caused Ament to quit the band.

Guitarist Mike McCready on the song:

I remember Jeff really loving it and Stone either not liking it or being indifferent about it. Jeff and Stone were arguing a lot about this song and were kind of mad at each other. Jeff got so pissed he went off and started dunking basketballs. It was like, "What's up, dude?" He got really pissed. He related this story to me recently. It was the typical Stone goes one way/Jeff goes the other. That is just how they work. They have been together forever and the dynamic between the two of them makes things work. There was a big, heated argument. But I thought it was a cool song with a cool vibe. It may have been an example of mid-tempo-itis. I recall the big argument between the two. Jeff said it was almost like he was going to quit. It was serious shit.

Ament on the song:

I was really, really into that song. Stone wrote that song musically. There was a point during the recording of Ten that Stone was like, "Eh, I'm over it." And I was like, "No! Let's work on it." We actually got in a big fight about it in the studio. It didn't end up getting worked on anymore. It got to a point and Stone was over it. I think maybe to some degree Ed probably wasn't totally happy with where it was at, so it never came out. I think there's great guitar on that song.

The song was featured on the rarities compilation album, Lost Dogs, but without lyrics, only the instrumental parts. When it came time for the band to select tracks to include on Lost Dogs, Gossard remained uninterested in the song and Vedder decided he was no longer pleased with his lyrics. Vedder suggested to McCready that he overdub some guitar parts in place of the lyrics and this is the version that appears on Lost Dogs. McCready said, "Ed didn't really like the original lyrics. He was like, 'Hey man, if you want, go in and put some guitar stuff on it.' I didn't have really any idea what to do, but I went down and listened to it and thought I'd do some Brian May-style layered guitars on it. I guess this is a final chapter and a lyrical burial."

== Lyrics ==
Before a performance of "Brother" at Pearl Jam's February 7, 1991 concert in Los Angeles, California at Florentine Gardens, Vedder said that the song was about the concept of "big brother."

== Reception ==
The version of "Brother" with vocals was released to radio in 2009, though a commercial single was not released. It reached number one on the Billboard Modern Rock Tracks chart (their fourth song to do so) and number five on the Billboard Mainstream Rock Tracks chart. The song spent a total of two weeks at number one on the Modern Rock chart. In Canada, the song reached the top 60 on the Canadian Hot 100.

In March 2009, "Brother" was made available as a downloadable bonus track for the Rock Band series for those who purchase the Ten re-release through Best Buy.

== Live performances ==
"Brother" was first performed live at the band's February 7, 1991 concert in Los Angeles, California at Florentine Gardens. After this concert, the song was not performed live for a period of 18 years. "Brother" finally made a return appearance at the band's August 8, 2009 concert in Calgary, Alberta, Canada at the Virgin Festival. The song was then played a few more times throughout the Backspacer Tour, though it hasn’t been played since 2010. Live performances of "Brother" can be found on various official bootlegs.

== Personnel ==
- Stone Gossard – guitar
- Mike McCready – guitar
- Jeff Ament – bass
- Dave Krusen – drums

== Chart performance ==
Chart (2009)	Peak position
Canada Hot 100 (Billboard)	60
Czech Republic (Top 20 Modern Rock)	11
US Alternative Airplay (Billboard)	1
US Mainstream Rock (Billboard)	5
US Bubbling Under Hot 100 (Billboard)	8
