= Alive (Pearl Jam song) =

1991 single by Pearl Jam

Single by Pearl Jam

from the album Ten
- B-side: "Once"; "Wash"
- Written: 1990
- Released: July 7, 1991
- Recorded: January 1991; June 1991
- Studio: London Bridge (Seattle, Washington); Ridge Farm (Dorking, England)
- Genre: Grunge
- Length: 5:41
- Label: Epic
- Composer: Stone Gossard
- Lyricist: Eddie Vedder
- Producers: Rick Parashar; Pearl Jam

Pearl Jam singles chronology
"Alive" (1991)	"Even Flow" (1992)

Music video
- "Alive" on YouTube

"Alive" is the debut single by American rock band Pearl Jam. It was released on July 7, 1991, 51 days before the release of the band's debut album, Ten, on which "Alive" appears. Written by guitarist Stone Gossard, the song originated as an instrumental titled "Dollar Short" and was included on a demo tape circulated in hopes of finding a singer for the group. Vocalist Eddie Vedder obtained a copy of the tape and wrote lyrics that describe a somewhat fictionalized account of the time when he was told that the man he thought was his father was not actually his biological parent.

"Alive" charted at number 16 in the United Kingdom and number nine in Australia. In August 2018, it became the first Pearl Jam song to receive a certification from the British Phonographic Industry (BPI), eventually receiving a gold certification in July 2022 for sales and streams of over 400,000. It also reached the top 20 in Belgium, Ireland, the Netherlands, and New Zealand. The single was available only through import in the United States, so it was not able to chart on the Billboard Hot 100. However, the song did peak at number 16 on the Album Rock Tracks chart and number 18 on the Modern Rock Tracks chart.

Remixed versions of the song were included on Pearl Jam's 2004 greatest hits album, Rearviewmirror (Greatest Hits 1991–2003), and the 2009 Ten reissue.

== Origin and recording ==
Guitarist Stone Gossard wrote the music for the song, which he titled "Dollar Short", in 1990 when he was still a member of Mother Love Bone. According to Gossard in an interview for Pearl Jam's VH1 Storytellers special, Mother Love Bone frontman Andrew Wood had even sung on it. After Wood died of a heroin overdose, Gossard and his bandmate Jeff Ament started playing with guitarist Mike McCready with the hope of starting a new band. "Dollar Short" was one of five tracks compiled onto a tape called Stone Gossard Demos '91 that Gossard, Ament, and McCready circulated in the hopes of finding a singer and drummer for the group.

The tape made its way into the hands of vocalist Eddie Vedder, who was working as a security guard for a petroleum company in San Diego, California, at the time. He listened to the tape shortly before going surfing, where lyrics came to him. Vedder mailed the tape back to Seattle. Upon hearing the tape, the band invited Vedder to come to Seattle and he was asked to join the band.

The band, then called Mookie Blaylock, recorded "Alive" during a demo session at London Bridge studio in January 1991. The version recorded during this session would later appear on the group's debut album, Ten, and on the promotional "Alive" EP. During album mixing sessions in England in June 1991, mixer Tim Palmer had McCready add to the song's outro solo. McCready recorded a number of attempts at the solo, and Palmer edited them into a composite version. The guitarist was unsatisfied with the result, so he made another attempt at the solo, this time using a Uni-Vibe while recording. "He had another go at it", Palmer recalled, "and got it right away. There was no piecing together to do; it was one take."

== Composition ==
"Alive" features an extended guitar solo performed by McCready; this was ranked number 44 on Guitar World's list of the "100 Greatest Guitar Solos", and number 26 on Total Guitar's list of the "100 Hottest Guitar Solos". When interviewed about his famous solo, McCready was quick to disclaim creative credit for it, saying he basically "copied Ace Frehley's solo from 'She', which was copied from Robby Krieger's solo in The Doors' 'Five to One'." Aside from that influence, it strongly highlights the influences of Jimi Hendrix on McCready's playing, including extensive wah pedal use, frequent whammy bar dips and vibrato, as well as the use of a battered Stratocaster guitar. During many live shows he has been known to break into the outro lead solo for Black Sabbath's "War Pigs".

== Lyrics ==
The song is the first piece of the three songs in what Vedder later described as a "mini-opera" entitled Mamasan, which is composed of the songs "Alive", "Once", and "Footsteps". "Alive" tells the story of a young man discovering that the man he thought was his father is actually his stepfather, while his mother's grief leads to an intimate relationship with the son, who strongly resembles the biological father. This leads to "Once" in which the man descends into madness and goes on a killing spree, and "Footsteps" in which the man is eventually looking back from a prison cell awaiting his execution.

"Alive" is partly autobiographical and partly fictional. When Vedder was a teenager, his mother told him that his father was actually his stepfather, and that his biological father was dead. The first and last verses detail those actual events, but the second verse is storytelling on Vedder's part. The lyrics of the second verse read, "Oh, she walks slowly, across a young man's room/She said I'm ready...for you/I can't remember anything to this very day/'Cept the look, the look.../Oh, you know where, now I can't see, I just stare..." Vedder revealed that "she" was the mother, and "the look" referred to was not the look on her face, but "the look is between her legs. Where do you go with that? That's where you came from."

Rather than being the inspirational song most interpret it as, Vedder had quite a different meaning in mind, stating with regard to the song's protagonist, "He's still dealing, he's still growing up. He's still dealing with love, he's still dealing with the death of his father. All he knows is 'I'm still alive' -- those three words, that's totally out of burden." Vedder stated at Pearl Jam's 2006 VH1 Storytellers appearance that over the years the meaning has changed for him. He said, "In the original story, a teenager is being made aware of a shocking truth that leaves him plenty confused...It was a curse—'I'm still alive.'" The audience's response to the song is what has brought about the change in meaning for Vedder. He added, "They lifted the curse. The audience changed the meaning for me."

== Release and reception ==
While the "Alive" single was released commercially to international markets in 1992, an early version of the track was released on the Coca-Cola Pop Music Sampler in 1991. The album version was released as a single in the United States on June 27, 1995, and was only available as a more expensive import version beforehand. Prior to its commercial release, "Alive" was released as a promotional CD and cassette featuring different artwork and B-sides. While "Wash" was also a B-side to the commercial singles, "I've Got a Feeling" was only on this version of the single. The guitar solo at the end of "Alive" was also different from the Ten version, and there are a few other noticeable differences between the two. The B-side "Wash" can also be found as an extra track on European releases of Ten and as an alternate version on the compilation album, Lost Dogs (2003).

Gossard said that "not a lot of people thought ["Alive"] was a great single when we released it ... I don't think that the record company thought it was a slam-dunk. They went, 'Oh! This seems like the best one so far.'" The song peaked at number 16 on the Billboard Mainstream Rock Tracks chart and number 18 on the Billboard Modern Rock Tracks chart. Although the album's follow-up singles would find more success on the rock charts, "Alive" was nevertheless important in bringing attention to the band. The single also spent a record-breaking 61 weeks on the Billboard Bubbling Under Hot 100 Singles chart.

Steve Huey of Allmusic said that while "Alive" has a "big, stadium-ready chorus," it also is "subtler, less macho, and less grandiose than true arena rock." Regarding the song's guitar solo, Huey said, "It adds a final epic touch to the song, as though the lyric-centered part of the song simply wasn't enough to achieve complete catharsis." Stephen M. Deusner of Pitchfork said that "'Alive' remains potent not only because Vedder touches on some seriously transgressive shit here (dead fathers, hints at incest, survivor guilt), but mostly because the band rock the hell out of that coda." In 2021, American Songwriter and Kerrang each ranked the song number two on their lists of the greatest Pearl Jam songs.

"Alive" is featured in the 2007 video game, SingStar Amped, for the PlayStation 2. The song is also featured in the 2008 video game, Rock Band 2. In March 2009, the rest of the album Ten was also made available as downloadable content for the Rock Band series. A live version of "Alive" taken from the band's September 20, 1992, concert was made available as a downloadable bonus track for the Rock Band series for those who purchased the Ten re-release through Best Buy. In July 2009, Australian radio station Triple J polls the Hottest 100 of All Time which "Alive" was voted #25 on the list, although the song was voted higher in the 1998 hottest 100 of all-time list at #3. In 2021, it was ranked number 416 on Rolling Stone's list of the "500 Greatest Songs of All Time".

=== Accolades ===
Year	Publication	Country	Accolade	Rank
1993	Rolling Stone	United States	Top 100 Music Videos	84
2002	Kerrang!	United Kingdom	100 Greatest Singles of All Time	51
2003	Q	United Kingdom	The 1001 Best Songs Ever	497
2004	Kerrang!	United Kingdom	666 Songs You Must Own (Grunge)	3
2006	Total Guitar	United Kingdom	100 Hottest Guitar Solos	26
2007	Guitar World	United States	100 Greatest Guitar Solos	44

== Music video ==
The music video for "Alive" was directed by Josh Taft, a childhood friend of Gossard, who would later direct the music videos for "Even Flow" and "Oceans". The black-and-white video consists of a filmed live performance of the band filmed on August 3, 1991, during a Pearl Jam concert at RKCNDY in Seattle, Washington; thus, different from most music videos, the version of the song heard in the clip is actually being played in the concert rather than being a lip-sync from the record version. Drummer Matt Chamberlain can be seen drumming in the "Alive" video. Pearl Jam's future drummer Dave Abbruzzese was in the audience when the video was shot. It was his first encounter with the band as he had just arrived from Texas after being recommended for the band by Chamberlain and only knew the songs from the "Alive" single. The video was released in September 1991.

Regarding the live video, Ament said, "Initially, it was a problem in terms of talking the record company into taking it seriously...That people didn't think we could pull it off made us want to do it even more. We felt we could do a better version of it. Sonically, it's an inferior version of the song. But it's live." The video was nominated for Best Alternative Video at the 1992 MTV Video Music Awards.

== Live performances ==
"Alive" was first performed live at the band's October 22, 1990, concert in Seattle, Washington at the Off Ramp Café. Pearl Jam performed the song for its appearance on MTV Unplugged in 1992. The song was performed on Saturday Night Live in April 1992 in support of Ten. "Alive" has gone on to become the band's second most performed live song at over 880 performances, behind only "Even Flow" which has been played over 940 times. Following the June 2000 Roskilde Festival tragedy in which nine people died during Pearl Jam's set, the band purposely omitted "Alive" from all shows on its 2000 North American tour until the final night in Seattle. Pearl Jam performed the song for its appearance on VH1 Storytellers in 2006.

Live performances of "Alive" can be found on European releases of Ten, the compilation album Stanley, Son of Theodore: Yet Another Alternative Music Sampler, the "Oceans" single, the "Dissident"/Live in Atlanta box set, various official bootlegs, the live album Live in NYC 12/31/92, the Live at the Gorge 05/06 box set, the live album Live at Lollapalooza 2007, and the Drop in the Park LP included in the Super Deluxe edition of the Ten reissue. Performances of the song are also included on the DVD Immagine in Cornice and the MTV Unplugged DVD included in the Ten reissue.

== Track listings ==
All songs were written by Eddie Vedder and Stone Gossard except where noted.

European 7-inch single (EPC 657572 7)

1. "Alive" – 5:40
2. "Once" – 3:51

European 12-inch single and US CD single (EPC 657572 6/34K 77933)

1. "Alive" – 5:40
2. "Once" – 3:51
3. "Wash" (Ament, Gossard, Krusen, McCready, Vedder) – 3:34

Japanese CD single (SRCS 5884)

1. "Alive" (live) – 4:57
2. "Even Flow" (re-recorded) – 5:07
3. "Wash" (Ament, Gossard, Krusen, McCready, Vedder) – 3:35
4. "Dirty Frank" (Abbruzzese, Ament, Gossard, McCready, Vedder) – 5:39

== Personnel ==
- Eddie Vedder – vocals
- Mike McCready – lead guitar, acoustic-electric guitar
- Stone Gossard – rhythm guitar
- Jeff Ament – bass guitar
- Dave Krusen – drums
- Matt Chamberlain – drums ("Alive" live version on Japanese CD single)
- Dave Abbruzzese – drums ("Even Flow" re-recorded version, "Dirty Frank")

== Charts ==
=== Weekly charts ===
Chart (1991–1992)	Peak position
Australia (ARIA)	9
Australia Alternative (ARIA)	2
Belgium (Ultratop 50 Flanders)	16
Europe (Eurochart Hot 100)	53
Germany (GfK)	44
Holland Airplay (Music & Media)	16
Ireland (IRMA)	13
Netherlands (Dutch Top 40)	13
Netherlands (Single Top 100)	19
New Zealand (Recorded Music NZ)	20
Spain Airplay (Music & Media)	15
UK Singles (Official Charts)	16
US Alternative Airplay (Billboard)	18
US Mainstream Rock Airplay (Billboard)	16

Chart (1998)	Peak position
US Bubbling Under Hot 100 (Billboard)	7

Chart (2009)	Peak position
US Digital Song Sales (Billboard)	66

=== Year-end charts ===
Chart (1992)	Position
Australia (ARIA)	38

== Certifications ==
Region	Certification	Certified units/sales
Australia (ARIA)	Gold	35,000^{^}
Brazil (Pro-Música Brasil)	Gold	30,000^{‡}
Denmark (IFPI Danmark)	Gold	45,000^{‡}
Italy (FIMI)	Gold	25,000^{‡}
New Zealand (RMNZ)	3× Platinum	90,000^{‡}
Spain (Promusicae)	Gold	30,000^{‡}
United Kingdom (BPI)	Gold	400,000^{‡}
^{^} Shipments figures based on certification alone.^{‡} Sales+streaming figures based on certification alone.

== Release history ==
Region	Date	Format(s)	Label(s)	Ref.
Worldwide	July 7, 1991	Various	Epic	
United Kingdom	February 3, 1992	7-inch vinyl; 12-inch vinyl; CD; cassette	Epic	
Australia	February 10, 1992	CD; cassette	Epic	
Japan	June 21, 1992	CD	Sony	
United States	June 27, 1995	CD	Epic	
