= Even Flow =

1992 single by Pearl Jam

Single by Pearl Jam

from the album Ten
- B-side: "Dirty Frank" / "Oceans" (remix)
- Released: March 30, 1992
- Recorded: March 27 – April 26, 1991 (Ten version); January 1992 (video version)
- Studio: London Bridge (Seattle, Washington) (both versions)
- Genre: Grunge
- Length: 4:54
- Label: Epic
- Composer: Stone Gossard
- Lyricist: Eddie Vedder
- Producers: Rick Parashar; Pearl Jam

Pearl Jam singles chronology
| "Alive" (1991) | "Even Flow" (1992) | "Jeremy" (1992) |

Audio sample
- file; help

Music video
- "Even Flow" on YouTube

"Even Flow" is a song by the American rock band Pearl Jam. Featuring lyrics written by vocalist Eddie Vedder and music written by guitarist Stone Gossard, it was released in March 1992 by Epic Records as the second single from the band's debut album, Ten (1991). The song peaked at number three on the US Billboard Mainstream Rock Tracks chart. The song was included in Pearl Jam's 2004 greatest hits album, Rearviewmirror (Greatest Hits 1991–2003). A remixed version of the song was included on the 2009 Ten reissue.

== Origin and recording ==
"Even Flow" features lyrics written by vocalist Eddie Vedder and music written by guitarist Stone Gossard. Bassist Jeff Ament said, "I knew it was a great song all along, and I felt that it was the best song that we got the worst take of on the first record. There were a hundred takes on that song, and we just never nailed it." Drummer Dave Krusen said, "I was pretty green back then and 'Even Flow' suffered from too much fluctuation." He added that "it was really tough for me. I don't know why. Not sure why we didn't use that one from the demo as well, but I know it felt better." Guitarist Mike McCready stated, "We did 'Even Flow' about 50, 70 times. I swear to God it was a nightmare. We played that thing over and over until we hated each other. I still don't think Stone is satisfied with how it came out." McCready also expressed his displeasure with his guitar solo on the song: “I’ve always wanted to do a better “Even Flow” solo than the one that’s on (the song). I shouldn’t say that, because I think some people like it the way it is… when we’re playing it live I always want to do it better.”

An alternate version of the song was recorded with drummer Dave Abbruzzese in 1992 while the band was recording songs for the soundtrack for the 1992 film, Singles. This version was used for the music video, and was used in single releases in the United Kingdom. This version is on Pearl Jam's 2004 greatest hits album, rearviewmirror (Greatest Hits 1991–2003).

== Composition and lyrics ==
"Even Flow" was written in the key of D major, with Gossard performing his parts in open D tuning and McCready complementing it with a similar rhythm pattern in standard tuning. The recorded version of the song actually sounds slightly sharper than D major, with everything tuned up—accidentally or otherwise—around one quarter of a step. The song features a funk guitar riff by Gossard.

McCready on the song:

That's me pretending to be Stevie Ray Vaughan, and a feeble attempt at that. Stone (Gossard, Pearl Jam guitarist) wrote the riff and song; I think it's a D tuning. I just followed him in a regular pattern. I tried to steal everything I know from Stevie Ray Vaughan and put it into that song. A blatant rip-off. A tribute rip-off, if you will!

The vocal line that appears in the main verse begins with a very prominent tritone interval.

The stark lyrics by Vedder for "Even Flow" describe the experience of being a homeless man. The subject sleeps "on a pillow made of concrete" and panhandles passersby for spare change. In addition to being illiterate, he may also be mentally ill, as he "looks insane" when he smiles and struggles to keep coherent thoughts ("Even flow, thoughts arrive like butterflies/Oh, he don't know, so he chases them away").

At Pearl Jam's March 28, 1994, concert at the Bayfront Amphitheater in Miami, Vedder introduced the song by saying, "I thought I'd throw in a bit of street education while you still have an open mind. ... Right across the street there's a little homeless community that lives under the bridge. You should just know that those people ain't all crazy and sometimes it's not their fault. This song is called 'Even Flow'."

At the May 12, 2008, show in Toronto, Vedder stated that the song was written under the Space Needle in Seattle. At a subsequent show in Seattle on August 8, 2018, Vedder revealed that the song was inspired by a homeless Vietnam War veteran (also named Eddie) whom he befriended while working on the band's first album. Vedder wrote the song after learning that the man had died while the band was touring.

== Release and reception ==
The alternate studio recording of "Even Flow", which was recorded in 1992 with Abbruzzese, was released as a CD single and 12-inch white vinyl in the United Kingdom. The original version was used in single releases in the United States. The song was released as a single in 1992 with a previously unreleased funk B-side titled "Dirty Frank", which can also be found as an extra track on European releases of Ten and as an alternate version on the compilation album, Lost Dogs (2003).

The song peaked at number three on the Billboard Mainstream Rock Tracks chart and number 21 on the Billboard Modern Rock Tracks chart. Outside the United States, the single was released commercially in Australia, Austria, Brazil, Germany, the Netherlands, and the United Kingdom. In Canada, the song reached the top 80 on the Canadian Singles Chart. "Even Flow" peaked at number 27 in the UK and number 22 on the Australian Singles Chart. It was a moderate top 20 success in New Zealand.

Chris True of AllMusic called "Even Flow" "the somewhat less ballady more swaggering follow up to the breakout single 'Alive'." True said that the song "doesn’t even really have an intro—it just starts and keeps going—and the band seems more in the groove than on the overly earnest 'Alive'." True said that the song "confirmed that Pearl Jam were more than just one hit grunge rock wonders." The song was placed at number 77 on a list of "The 100 Greatest Guitar Songs of All Time" by Rolling Stone. It was also included on VH1's countdown of the "100 Greatest Hard Rock Songs" at number 30. According to Nielsen Music's year-end report for 2019, "Even Flow" was the fifth most-played song of the decade spanning the years 2010 to 2019 on mainstream rock radio with 132,000 spins. All of the songs in the top 10 were from the 1990s. In 2021, American Songwriter ranked the song number three on their list of the 10 greatest Pearl Jam songs, and Kerrang ranked the song number eight on their list of the 20 greatest Pearl Jam songs.

== Music video ==
=== Original video ===
Pearl Jam originally hired director Rocky Schenck to film a music video for "Even Flow". On January 31, 1992, on their way to England, to begin a European tour, the band members came to Los Angeles to film the video. The concept for the video was based on an idea by Gossard. Schenck filmed Pearl Jam in a zoo setting. He had arranged a nighttime shoot at an old, closed facility, brought in different wildlife, and set up his lights among the cages and in the trees. Along with the animal footage, the members of Pearl Jam were filmed individually and as a band, standing on the side of a cliff and air jamming. The shoot took hours, and the band was not pleased with the end result. Schenck's shoot was considered a waste of time and money by the band; it also damaged Abbruzzese's wrists significantly. After shooting had finished, he was taken to the emergency room where he was advised not to put strain on his wrists. Abbruzzese would drum on the band's European tour with a splint attached to his hands. In January 2021, the video was leaked on YouTube.

=== Official video ===
The original music video for "Even Flow" was ultimately replaced by a performance clip directed by Josh Taft, who had previously directed the "Alive" music video for the band, and who later directed the music video for "Oceans". The video consists of performance footage of the band filmed during a January 17, 1992, show at the Moore Theatre in Seattle. The video shows Vedder climbing the theatre, then jumping down between fans at the concert, and ending with McCready throwing his guitar towards the camera. Taft was filming that night not with his occupation as a director, but as a friend of Gossard's. At one point during the show, Vedder shouted indignantly: "This is not a TV studio, Josh! Turn these lights out! It's a fucking rock concert!" Taft left this incident in his final cut, but MTV clipped it out when it aired the video.

The footage used in the video is actually spliced from different songs: for instance Gossard and McCready each play two different guitars, Vedder wears a hat at some point and the theatre climb actually occurred during "Porch". Taft's presence at the Moore Theatre show, and the fact that he had filmed sufficient footage to compile into a music video, proved to be a break for the band. Otherwise, with Epic ready to provide MTV with an "Even Flow" video and Schenck's version already completed, Pearl Jam would have had little choice but to go with it, and the band members unanimously despised Schenck's version when they saw the final edit. The alternate studio recording of "Even Flow", which was recorded in 1992 with Abbruzzese, was used for the video as the band felt it synched up well with the live footage. The video was released in April 1992. The full January 17, 1992, show was released in 2013 as an audio download, Seattle, WA 17-January-1992.

== Live performances ==
"Even Flow" was first performed live at the band's October 22, 1990, concert in Seattle at the Off Ramp Café. Pearl Jam performed the song for its appearance on MTV Unplugged in 1992. "Even Flow" has gone on to become the band's most performed live song, having been played more than 800 times (the next most played song, "Alive", is at more than 730 performances). Over the years, the tempo of the song has become slightly faster in live performances. Live performances of "Even Flow" can be found on the "Dissident" single, the live album Live on Two Legs, the compilation album Wild and Wooly: The Northwest Rock Collection, various official bootlegs, the live album Live in NYC 12/31/92, the Live at the Gorge 05/06 box set, the live album Live at Lollapalooza 2007, and the Drop in the Park LP included in the Super Deluxe edition of the Ten reissue. Performances of the song are also included on the DVDs Touring Band 2000, Live at the Garden, Immagine in Cornice, and the MTV Unplugged DVD included in the Ten reissue. On Live at the Garden, McCready performs an improv within "Even Flow" that goes on for nearly five minutes.

== Personnel ==
- Eddie Vedder – vocals
- Mike McCready – lead guitar
- Stone Gossard – rhythm guitar
- Jeff Ament – fretless bass
- Dave Krusen – drums

== Track listing ==
- CD (US, Australia, Austria, Brazil, and Germany) and Cassette (Australia)
1. "Even Flow" (Eddie Vedder, Stone Gossard) – 4:53
2. "Dirty Frank" (Dave Abbruzzese, Jeff Ament, Gossard, Mike McCready, Vedder) – 5:32
3. "Oceans" (remix) (Vedder, Gossard, Ament) – 2:46
- CD (UK) and 12" Vinyl (UK)
1. "Even Flow" (new version) (Vedder, Gossard) – 5:04
2. "Dirty Frank" (Abbruzzese, Ament, Gossard, McCready, Vedder) – 5:32
3. "Oceans" (Vedder, Gossard, Ament) – 2:42
- 7" Vinyl (UK) and Cassette (UK)
1. "Even Flow" (new version) (Vedder, Gossard) – 5:04
2. "Oceans" (remix) (Vedder, Gossard, Ament) – 2:46
- 7" Vinyl (The Netherlands) and Cassette (New Zealand)
1. "Even Flow" (Vedder, Gossard) – 4:53
2. "Dirty Frank" (Abbruzzese, Ament, Gossard, McCready, Vedder) – 5:32

== Charts ==
=== Weekly charts ===
| Chart (1992) | Peak position |
|---|---|
| Australia (ARIA) | 22 |
| Canada Top Singles (RPM) | 74 |
| European Hot 100 Singles (Music & Media) | 99 |
| New Zealand (Recorded Music NZ) | 20 |
| UK Singles (Official Charts) | 27 |
| UK Airplay (Music Week) | 43 |
| US Alternative Airplay (Billboard) | 21 |
| US Mainstream Rock (Billboard) | 3 |

| Chart (1997) | Peak position |
|---|---|
| US Bubbling Under Hot 100 (Billboard) | 8 |

| Chart (2009) | Peak position |
|---|---|
| US Hot Digital Songs (Billboard) | 62 |

=== Year-end charts ===
| Chart (1992) | Position |
|---|---|
| US Album Rock Tracks (Billboard) | 18 |

=== Decade-end charts ===
| Chart (2010–2019) | Position |
|---|---|
| US Mainstream Rock (Nielsen Music) | 5 |

== Certifications ==
| Region | Certification | Certified units/sales |
|---|---|---|
| Brazil (Pro-Música Brasil) | Gold | 30,000^{‡} |
| Italy (FIMI) | Gold | 50,000^{‡} |
| New Zealand (RMNZ) | 3× Platinum | 90,000^{‡} |
| Spain (Promusicae) | Gold | 30,000^{‡} |
| United Kingdom (BPI) Sales since 2000 | Platinum | 600,000^{‡} |
^{‡} Sales+streaming figures based on certification alone.

== Accolades ==
| Publication | Country | Accolade | Year | Rank |
|---|---|---|---|---|
| Rolling Stone | United States | "The 100 Greatest Guitar Songs of All Time" | 2008 | 77 |
| VH1 | United States | "100 Greatest Hard Rock Songs" | 2008 | 30 |
