= Once (Pearl Jam song) =

Song by Pearl Jam

from the album Ten
- A-side: "Alive"
- Released: July 7, 1991
- Recorded: 1991
- Studio: London Bridge (Seattle, Washington)
- Length: 3:51
- Label: Epic
- Composer: Stone Gossard
- Lyricist: Eddie Vedder
- Producers: Rick Parashar; Pearl Jam

"Once" is a song by the American rock band Pearl Jam. Featuring lyrics written by vocalist Eddie Vedder and music written by guitarist Stone Gossard, "Once" is the first track on the band's debut studio album, Ten (1991). On Ten, it is preceded by a brief interlude of the album's closing hidden track, "Master/Slave". Besides Ten, the song was also featured as a B-side on the single for "Alive". Remixed versions of the song were included on Pearl Jam's 2004 greatest hits album, Rearviewmirror (Greatest Hits 1991–2003), and the 2009 Ten reissue. It has been described as one of the band's heaviest songs.

== Origin and recording ==
"Once" features lyrics written by vocalist Eddie Vedder and music written by guitarist Stone Gossard. The song originated as an instrumental demo titled "Agyptian Crave" that was written by Gossard in 1990. The instrumental was one of five songs compiled onto a tape called Stone Gossard Demos '91 that was circulated in the hopes of finding a singer and drummer for the group.

The tape made its way into the hands of Vedder, who was working as a gas station attendant in San Diego, California at the time. He listened to the tape shortly before going surfing, where lyrics came to him. Vedder recorded vocals for three of the songs on the demo tape, one of which was "Once", and mailed the tape back to Seattle. Upon hearing the tape, the band invited Vedder to come to Seattle and he was asked to join the band.

== Lyrics ==
"Once" is the middle chapter of a trilogy of songs in what Vedder later described as a "mini-opera" entitled Mamasan, with it being preceded by "Alive" and followed by "Footsteps". "Once" tells the tale of a man's descent into madness which leads him into becoming a serial killer.

During the bridge of the song, Vedder can be heard muttering. He is actually saying "You think I got my eyes closed/But I'm lookin' at you the whole fuckin' time..."

== Reception ==
Stephen M. Deusner of Pitchfork Media said, "On songs like 'Once', with its insistent breakdowns...there's a hardscrabble dynamic that the band would be unable to capture on subsequent releases."

In 2018, Classic Rock ranked "Once" as Ten's best song.

== Live performances ==
"Once" was first performed live at the band's October 22, 1990 concert in Seattle, Washington, at the Off Ramp Café. Live performances of "Once" can be found on the "Dissident"/Live in Atlanta box set, various official bootlegs, the Live at the Gorge 05/06 box set, and the Drop in the Park LP included in the Super Deluxe edition of the Ten reissue.

== Personnel ==
Pearl Jam

- Dave Krusen – drums
- Jeff Ament – fretless bass
- Eddie Vedder – vocals
- Mike McCready – lead guitar
- Stone Gossard – rhythm guitar

Additional musician

- Rick Parashar – percussion
