= Oceans (Pearl Jam song) =

1992 single by Pearl Jam

Single by Pearl Jam

from the album Ten
- B-side: "Why Go" (live); "Deep" (live); "Alive" (live)
- Released: December 7, 1992
- Recorded: March 27 – April 26, 1991; June 1991 (overdubs)
- Studio: London Bridge, Seattle, Washington; Ridge Farm, Dorking, England (overdubs)
- Genre: Grunge
- Length: 2:41
- Label: Epic
- Composers: Eddie Vedder; Stone Gossard; Jeff Ament
- Lyricist: Eddie Vedder
- Producers: Rick Parashar; Pearl Jam

Pearl Jam singles chronology
"Jeremy" (1992)	"Oceans" (1992)	"Go" (1993)

Music video
- "Oceans" on YouTube

"Oceans" is a song by the American rock band Pearl Jam. Featuring lyrics written by vocalist Eddie Vedder and music co-written by Vedder, guitarist Stone Gossard, and bassist Jeff Ament, "Oceans" was released in 1992 as the fourth single from the band's debut album, Ten (1991). Remixed versions of the song can be found on the "Even Flow" single and the 2009 Ten reissue.

== Origin and recording ==
"Oceans" features lyrics written by vocalist Eddie Vedder and music co-written by Vedder, guitarist Stone Gossard, and bassist Jeff Ament. Vedder on the song:

I remember for "Oceans", someone asked me to put change in the parking meter for them. I went and did that and then I came back and was locked out. It was drizzling and I wasn't dressed for an outing in the rain. I had a scrap of paper and a pen in my pocket, and they were playing this song [inside]. All I could hear was the bass coming through the wall, this window that was boarded up. So I wrote the song to the bass. I wasn't even listening to hear the song at first. When I heard a break, I'd start pounding on the door...trying to get out of the rain. So as I was doing that, I thought, fuck it, I might as well write something.

Gossard on the song:

We wrote it, we played it and Ed sang it, which is another thing that he does. I'd never seen anyone engage with song writing the same way. Here's the song, let me play it for you. It goes like this. Okay, theres a change here, let's do it and he would sing it. I'd hear the melodies and I'd think, okay, he's gonna write words or whatever and then I realized later that he actually had written the words right there. I couldn't understand how somebody could do that. Since then I've met a lot of people that can do it so it was an eye opener but he does it better than anyone I've ever seen do it.

Drummer Dave Krusen on the song:

We originally tracked drum kit on that song. Then I added three tympani parts. I remember we were all in the control room listening to the tympani part with the drums muted. Someone commented how cool it sounded like that, so we kept it that way. I'm glad we did.

When the band joined the album's mixer, Tim Palmer, in June 1991 in Dorking, England for mixing, Palmer overdubbed a pepper shaker and a fire extinguisher as percussion on the track. Palmer said, "The reason I used those items was purely because we were so far from a music rental shop and necessity became the mother of invention."

== Composition ==
"Oceans" was performed in open D tuning. The song is musically and texturally different from the rest of the album. Ament said, "When we were picking songs for Ten we thought it was important to pick the weirder moments, like "Oceans", because we wanted to be able to explore those areas down the line."

Gossard on the song:

I love "Oceans". That probably sums up why I get excited about song writing. It's like open D tuning where the first chord's just straight across and it's just two fingers that come on and off to create the whole thing and then it moves down one position and it moves back up. It has a tiny little change in it but it's also got three big movements. What I love about music is aesthetic chords; the simpler the better and then another set that does something to those original chords. It's a really simple arrangement.

As part of the downloadable Ten track pack, the Rock Band 2 version of "Oceans" is mixed with Krusen's original drum track, which enters when Vedder sings the final lyric, instantly creating a climactic moment and retroactive buildup to it.

== Lyrics ==
"Oceans" was inspired by Vedder's affinity for surfing. Following Pearl Jam's performance of the song at the band's 1992 MTV Unplugged performance, Vedder stated, "[that was] a little love song I wrote about my surfboard... Actually it was to someone named Beth who hopefully I'll see tomorrow."

== Release and reception ==
While the "Oceans" single was released commercially to international markets in 1992, the commercial single was not released in the United States until June 27, 1995, and was only available as a more expensive import version beforehand. Outside the United States, the single for "Oceans" was released commercially in Australia, Austria, and the United Kingdom. "Oceans" reached the top 30 in the Netherlands and was a moderate top 20 success in New Zealand.

In March 2009, "Oceans" was made available as downloadable content for the Rock Band series as a master track as part of the album Ten. The full, previously unreleased drum kit that was originally tracked by Dave Krusen was included in this version.

== Music video ==
The music video for "Oceans" was directed by Josh Taft, who had previously directed the "Alive" and "Even Flow" music videos for the band. The video was filmed in Hawaii in September 1992. The black-and-white video features scenes of the band members and other people in Hawaii, including Vedder surfing, Gossard driving, people swimming and running, and small planes flying. It also features performance footage of the band filmed in Maui, Hawaii at War Memorial Gymnasium. The video was only released to areas outside of the United States in late 1992. The video was not released in the United States as the band felt Ten was already too big. The video clip for "Oceans" can be found on the Touring Band 2000 DVD as one of the Special Features.

== Live performances ==
"Oceans" was first performed live at the band's May 17, 1991 concert in Seattle, Washington at the Off Ramp Café. Pearl Jam performed the song for their appearance on MTV Unplugged in 1992; however, this performance of the song was not aired when the show was first broadcast on MTV. Live performances of "Oceans" can be found on various official bootlegs and the live album Live in NYC 12/31/92. A performance of the song is also included on the MTV Unplugged DVD included in the Ten reissue.

== Personnel ==
Pearl Jam

- Eddie Vedder – vocals
- Mike McCready – lead guitar
- Stone Gossard – rhythm guitar
- Jeff Ament – bass guitar
- Dave Krusen – timpani

Additional musician

- Tim Palmer – fire extinguisher and pepper shaker

== Track listing ==
1. "Oceans" (Gossard, Ament, Vedder) – 2:44
2. "Why Go" (live) (Ament, Vedder) – 3:30
3. "Deep" (live) (Gossard, Ament, Vedder) – 4:24
4. "Alive" (live) (Gossard, Vedder) – 5:46
- Live tracks recorded by VARA Radio on June 8, 1992, at Pinkpop Festival in the Netherlands.

== Chart positions ==
Chart (1993)	Peak position
Australia (ARIA)	110
Belgium (Ultratop 50 Flanders)	35
Netherlands (Dutch Top 40)	21
Netherlands (Single Top 100)	30
New Zealand (Recorded Music NZ)	16
