= Ten (Pearl Jam album) =

1991 studio album by Pearl Jam

Studio album by Pearl Jam
- Released: August 27, 1991
- Recorded: March and April 1991
- Studios: London Bridge (Seattle, Washington)
- Genres: Grunge; alternative rock; hard rock
- Length: 53:20
- Label: Epic
- Producers: Rick Parashar; Pearl Jam

Pearl Jam chronology
Ten (1991)	Vs. (1993)

Alternative cover
- Cover for vinyl releases

Singles from Ten
- 1. "Alive" Released: July 7, 1991; 2. "Even Flow" Released: March 30, 1992; 3. "Jeremy" Released: August 17, 1992; 4. "Oceans" Released: December 7, 1992

Ten is the debut studio album by American rock band Pearl Jam, released on August 27, 1991, through Epic Records. Following the dissolution of their previous band Mother Love Bone in 1990, bassist Jeff Ament and guitarist Stone Gossard began rehearsing with new guitarist Mike McCready. The group recorded a five-song instrumental demo tape featuring Matt Cameron on drums. Copies of the demo were eventually given to drummer Dave Krusen and vocalist Eddie Vedder, both of whom were invited to audition for the band in Seattle. Many of the songs on Ten began as instrumental jams or Mother Love Bone songs for which Vedder composed new melodies and lyrics.

Despite its reputation as a quintessential grunge album, Ten is often noted for displaying a stronger classic rock influence than other contemporary grunge releases, drawing comparisons to the work of Jimi Hendrix and Led Zeppelin. The album is also characterised as having an anthemic, rich sound. Ten delves into social commentary, discussing subjects like depression, suicide, and loneliness. Notably, the song "Jeremy" and its accompanying video were inspired by a true story in which a high school student shot himself in front of his classmates.

Ten was not an immediate commercial success, but by late 1992, it had reached number 2 on the Billboard 200, where it remained for four consecutive weeks; it was held off from the top spot by Billy Ray Cyrus' album Some Gave All (1992). Ten went on to be a mainstay on the chart, and by the end of 1993 — two years after its release — it was within the year's top 10 best-selling albums in the US. The album produced three hit singles: "Alive", "Even Flow", and "Jeremy". "Jeremy" became one of Pearl Jam's best-known songs, and received nominations for Best Rock Song and Best Hard Rock Performance at the 35th Grammy Awards. "Black" was released as a promotional single in 1991. In 2021, the album was inducted into the Grammy Hall of Fame.

Beyond its role in consolidating the mainstream success of grunge rock in the early 1990s, Ten is generally considered to have been instrumental in the rise and dominance of alternative rock throughout the decade. The album has since been ranked by several publications as one of the greatest albums of all time. By February 2013, it had sold 10 million copies in the US, becoming the 22nd record to do so in the Nielsen SoundScan era, and has been certified 13× platinum by the Recording Industry Association of America (RIAA). Ten remains Pearl Jam's most commercially successful album.

== Background ==
Guitarist Stone Gossard and bassist Jeff Ament had played together in the pioneering grunge band Green River. Following Green River's dissolution in 1987, Ament and Gossard played together in Mother Love Bone during the late 1980s. Mother Love Bone's career was cut short when vocalist Andrew Wood died of a drug overdose in 1990, shortly before the release of the group's debut album, Apple. Devastated, it took months before Gossard and Ament agreed to play together again. Gossard spent his time afterwards writing material that was harder-edged than what he had been doing previously. After a few months, Gossard started practicing with fellow Seattle guitarist Mike McCready, whose band Shadow had broken up; McCready in turn encouraged Gossard to reconnect with Ament. The three then went into the studio for separate sessions with Soundgarden drummer Matt Cameron and former Shadow drummer Chris Friel to record some instrumental demos. Five of the songs recorded—"Dollar Short", "Agytian Crave", "Footsteps", "Richard's E", and "E Ballad"—were compiled onto a tape called Stone Gossard Demos '91 that was circulated in the hopes of finding a singer and drummer for the trio.

San Diego musician Eddie Vedder acquired a copy of the demo in September 1990, when it was given to him by former Red Hot Chili Peppers drummer Jack Irons. Vedder listened to the demo, went surfing, and wrote lyrics the next day for "Dollar Short", "Agytian Crave", and "Footsteps". "Dollar Short" and "Agytian Crave" were later retitled "Alive" and "Once", respectively. Gossard and Ament heard the demo with Vedder's vocals and lyrics, and were impressed enough to fly Vedder out to Seattle for an audition. Meanwhile, Vedder had written lyrics for "E Ballad", retitled "Black". Vedder arrived on October 13 and rehearsed with the band (now joined by drummer Dave Krusen) for a week, writing eleven songs in the process. Vedder was soon hired as the band's singer, and the group signed to Epic Records shortly thereafter.

== Recording ==
The band, then named Mookie Blaylock (after the basketball player of that name), entered London Bridge Studios in Seattle, Washington in March 1991 with producer Rick Parashar to record its debut album. After working with Parashar on Temple of the Dog, Stone and Ament asked him to co-produce and engineer Ten. Parashar also contributed piano, organ, percussion, co-wrote vocal harmonies and co-wrote the intro/outro of the album. A few tracks were previously recorded at London Bridge in January, but only "Alive" was carried over from that session. The album sessions were quick and lasted only a month, mainly due to the band having already written most of the material for the record. "Porch", "Deep", "Why Go", and "Garden" were first recorded during the album sessions; everything else had been previously recorded during demo sessions at some point. McCready said that "Ten was mostly Stone and Jeff; me and Eddie were along for the ride at that time." Ament stated, "We knew we were still a long way from being a real band at that point."

The recording sessions for Ten were completed in May 1991. Krusen left the band once the sessions were completed, checking himself into rehab. According to Krusen, he was suffering from personal problems at the time. Krusen said, "It was a great experience. I felt from the beginning of that band that it was something special," and added, "They had to let me go. I couldn't stop drinking, and it was causing problems. They gave me many chances, but I couldn't get it together." In June, the band joined Tim Palmer in England for mixing. Palmer decided to mix the album at Ridge Farm Studio in Dorking, a converted farm that according to Palmer was "about as far away from an L.A. or New York studio as you can get." Palmer made a few additions to the already-recorded songs, including having McCready finish up the guitar solo on "Alive" and tweaking the intro to "Black. Palmer overdubbed a pepper shaker and a fire extinguisher as percussion on "Oceans".

In subsequent years, band members have expressed dissatisfaction with the way the album's mixing turned out. In 2001, Ament said, "I'd love to remix Ten. Ed, for sure, would agree with me. It wouldn't be like changing performances; just pull some of the reverb off it." In 2002, Gossard said, "It was 'over-rocked', we were novices in the studio and spent too long recording, doing different takes, and killing the vibe and overdubbing tons of guitar. There's a lot of reverb on the record." In 2006, Vedder said, "I can listen to the early records [except] the first record...it's just the sound of the record. It was kind of mixed in a way that was...it was kind of produced." More recently Jeff Ament was quoted in The Seattle Times with a new perspective on the mixing “I probably hadn’t listened to that record in 25 years, unless there’s a song we haven’t played very much and we’re trying to go back. A song like ‘Deep’ or something. But it was cool. I listened to (mixer) Tim Palmer’s original mix of it and I really enjoyed what Tim did for that record. I think for a long time, I wanted us to be a more straight-ahead rock band. I felt like all of us wanted a more straight-ahead, drier sound. It reminded me of the reason that we decided to work with him in the first place.” According to Guitar World, Mike McCready's undisguised Stevie Ray Vaughan passion saw him bring Strats back into vogue. The guitarist described his playing on "Black" and "Even Flow" as an SRV “rip off”. Both guitarists used Marshall JCM800s for dirty tones and Fenders for clean parts.

== Music and lyrics ==
"Even Flow"
A sample of "Even Flow", the second single released from the album. The song has a funky riff written by Gossard and lyrics written by Vedder about homelessness.

"Jeremy"
A sample of "Jeremy", the third single released from the album. The lyrics for the song, written by Vedder, were inspired by a true story in which a high school student committed suicide in front of his classmates. It features prominent usage of Ament's 12-string bass guitar.

Ten has been described as a grunge, alternative rock, and hard rock album. Several of the songs on the album started as instrumental compositions that Vedder added lyrics to after he joined the band. Regarding the lyrics, Vedder said, "All I really believe in is this fucking moment, like right now. And that, actually, is what the whole album talks about." Vedder's lyrics for Ten deal with subjects like depression, suicide, loneliness, and murder. The album also tackles social concerns such as homelessness ("Even Flow") and the use of psychiatric hospitals ("Why Go"). The song "Jeremy" and its accompanying video were inspired by a true story in which a high school student shot himself in front of his classmates.

Many listeners interpreted "Alive" as an inspirational anthem due to its decidedly uplifting instrumentals and chorus. Vedder has since revealed that the song tells the semi-autobiographical tale of a son discovering that his father is actually his stepfather (his real father having died long ago), while his mother's grief turns her to sexually embrace her son, who strongly resembles the biological father. "Alive" and "Once" formed part of a song cycle in what Vedder later described as a "mini-opera" entitled Momma-Son (the third song, "Footsteps", appeared as a B-side on the "Jeremy" single). Vedder explained that the lyrics told the story of a young man whose father dies ("Alive"), causing him to go on a killing spree ("Once") which leads to his capture and execution ("Footsteps"). It was later revealed that Vedder's lyrics were inspired by his long-held hurt in discovering at age 17 that the man he thought was his father was not, and that his real father had already died.

While Ten deals with dark subject matter, it has generally been seen as a high-water mark of the early 1990s alternative rock sound, with Vedder's unusually deep and strong (and later much-imitated) voice alternating between solidity and vibrato against the unrestrained, guitar-heavy, hard rock sound that drew influence from Led Zeppelin and other rock bands of the 1970s. Ten's musical style, influenced by classic rock, combined an "expansive harmonic vocabulary" with an anthemic sound. Stephen Thomas Erlewine of AllMusic stated that the songs on the album fused "the riff-heavy stadium rock of the 1970s with the grit and anger of '80s post-punk, without ever neglecting hooks and choruses."

Ten features a two-part track entitled "Master/Slave" that both opens and closes the album. The first part begins the album, before "Once" starts, and the second part closes the album, after "Release". It begins about ten seconds after the album's closer "Release" as a hidden track, but both count as one track on the CD. The song is entirely instrumental (except for random unintelligible words Vedder utters throughout) with a dominant fretless bass line making up the core of the song (which Ament referred to in a 1994 Bass Player magazine interview as "my tribute to (fretless bass instrumentalist) Mick Karn"), along with some guitar and sounds that seem to come from the drums. Producer Rick Parashar stated in 2002, "As I recall, I think Jeff had, like, a bass line...I heard the bass line and then we kind of were collaborating on that in the control room, and then I just started programming on the keyboard all this stuff; he was jamming with it and it just kind of came about like that." In a 2021 interview with Kyle Meredith, Ament also revealed that he took inspiration from Cheap Trick's bass sounds for songs "Why Go" and "Jeremy".

=== Outtakes ===
The album's singles featured two B-sides from the Ten recording sessions which were not included on the album, "Wash" and "Yellow Ledbetter". The former was a B-side on the "Alive" single while the latter was featured on the "Jeremy" single and eventually became a radio hit in 1994. Both songs were included on the 2003 Lost Dogs collection of rarities, although the included version of "Wash" is an alternate take. The song "Alone" was also originally recorded for Ten; a 1992 re-recorded version of the song is on the "Go" single. Another version of "Alone", with re-recorded vocals, appears on Lost Dogs. According to McCready, "Alone" was cut from Ten because the band already had enough mid-tempo songs for the album. The song "Dirty Frank", which was released as a B-side on the "Even Flow" single and often thought to be a Ten outtake, was recorded after Ten was released. Thus, "Dirty Frank" is not from the Ten recording sessions.

The song "Footsteps" began as an instrumental demo and was compiled onto the Stone Gossard Demos '91 tape. Vedder added vocals to this version after he received the demo tape. The music for "Footsteps" was also used for Temple of the Dog's "Times of Trouble". "Footsteps" was featured as a B-side on the "Jeremy" single, however this version is taken from a 1992 appearance on the radio show Rockline. This version of "Footsteps" is also featured on Lost Dogs, however a harmonica intro has been overdubbed on to the recording.

Other songs rejected from the album but later included on Lost Dogs are "Hold On" and "Brother", the latter of which was turned into an instrumental for Lost Dogs. "Brother" was cut because Gossard was no longer interested in playing the song, a decision which Ament objected to and almost caused him to quit the band. The version of "Brother" with vocals appears on the 2009 Ten reissue and became a radio hit that same year. Both "Breath" and "State of Love and Trust" were recorded with the intention of the two songs possibly appearing in the film Singles. The versions heard in the film and on its soundtrack were recorded a year later in 1992. The versions from the Ten sessions appear on the 2009 Ten reissue. Other songs rejected from the album but included on the 2009 Ten reissue are "Just a Girl", "2,000 Mile Blues", and "Evil Little Goat".

The band also recorded a cover of the Mudhoney song "Touch Me I'm Sick". This recording has never been released.

== Release and promotion ==
=== Packaging ===
The album's cover art features the members of the band at the time of recording in a group pose and standing in front of a wood cut-out of the name "Pearl Jam", with their hands risen high and holding one another's. The wood cut-out was constructed by Jeff Ament. Ament said, "The original concept was about really being together as a group and entering into the world of music as a true band...a sort of all-for-one deal." Ament is credited for the album's artwork and art direction, Lance Mercer receives credit for photography, and both Lisa Sparagano and Risa Zaitschek are credited for design. Ament stated, "There was a bit of headbutting going on with the Sony art department at that time. The version that everybody got to know as the Ten album cover was pink and it was originally intended to be more of a burgundy color and the picture of the band was supposed to be black and white." Pearl Jam's original name was taken from the professional basketball player Mookie Blaylock. It was changed after the band signed to Epic Records, as record executives were concerned about intellectual property and naming rights following Blaylock's inking of an endorsement deal with Nike. In commemoration of the band's original name, the band titled Ten after Blaylock's jersey number.

In some versions (mainly CD and cassette releases), the cover is in gatefold form, folded in such a way that only the band members' hands are visible.

=== Tour ===
Ament stated that "essentially Ten was just an excuse to tour", adding, "We told the record company, 'We know we can be a great band, so let's just get the opportunity to get out and play.'" Pearl Jam faced a relentless touring schedule for Ten. Drummer Dave Abbruzzese joined the band for Pearl Jam's live shows supporting the album. Halfway through its own planned North American tour, Pearl Jam cancelled the remaining dates in order to take a slot opening for the Red Hot Chili Peppers on the band's Blood Sugar Sex Magik tour in the fall of 1991 in North America. The spot was arranged by Jack Irons, who had called his former band asking for them to get an opportunity to his friend Vedder. The Smashing Pumpkins and Nirvana were also supporting acts. Nirvana was initially brought in because the tour promoters decided that Pearl Jam should be replaced with a more successful act, but the departure of the Smashing Pumpkins still kept the group in the concert bill. Epic executive Michael Goldstone observed that "the band did such an amazing job opening the Chili Peppers tour that it opened doors at radio."

In 1992, the band embarked on its first ever European tour. On March 13, 1992, at the Munich, Germany show at Nachtwerk, Pearl Jam played Ten in its entirety in order midway through its set. The band would only do this again in 2016 at Philadelphia's Wells Fargo Center, as the arena management homaged the band's tenth straight sellout concert in the city. Following the European leg, Pearl Jam did another tour of North America. Goldstone noted that the band's audience expanded, saying that unlike before, "everyone came." The band's manager, Kelly Curtis, stated, "Once people came and saw them live, this lightbulb would go on. During their first tour, you kind of knew it was happening and there was no stopping it. To play in the Midwest and be selling out these 500 seat clubs. Eddie could say he wanted to talk to Brett, the sound guy, and they'd carry him out there on their hands. You hadn't really seen that reaction from a crowd before..." When Pearl Jam came back for a second go-around in Europe the band appeared at the Pinkpop Festival and the Roskilde Festival in June 1992. The band cancelled its remaining European dates in the summer of 1992 after the Roskilde Festival due to a confrontation with security at that event as well as exhaustion from touring. Ament said, "We'd been on the road over 10 months. I think there just came a point about half way through that tour it was just starting to get pretty intense. I mean just being away from home, being on the road all the time and being lonely or being depressed or whatever." The band would go on to play the 1992 Lollapalooza tour with the Red Hot Chili Peppers, Soundgarden, Ministry and Ice Cube, among others.

=== 2009 re-release ===
On March 24, 2009, Ten was reissued in four editions (Legacy, Deluxe, Vinyl, and Super Deluxe). It was the first reissue in a planned re-release of Pearl Jam's entire catalogue that led up to the band's 20th anniversary in 2011. The extras on the four editions include a remastering and remix of the entire album by producer Brendan O'Brien, re-designed packaging, six bonus tracks ("Brother", "Just a Girl", "Breath and a Scream", "State of Love and Trust", "2,000 Mile Blues", and "Evil Little Goat"), a DVD of the band's 1992 appearance on MTV Unplugged (including a bonus performance of "Oceans", which along with "Rockin' in the Free World" was originally excluded from the broadcast version), vinyl versions of the album, an LP of the band's September 20, 1992 concert at Magnuson Park in Seattle (also known as Drop in the Park), a replica of the original Momma-Son demo cassette, and a replica of Vedder's composition notebook containing personal notes and mementos.

Regarding his remix of the album, O'Brien stated, "The band loved the original mix of Ten, but were also interested in what it would sound like if I were to deconstruct and remix it...The original Ten sound is what millions of people bought, dug and loved, so I was initially hesitant to mess around with that. After years of persistent nudging from the band, I was able to wrap my head around the idea of offering it as a companion piece to the original—giving a fresh take on it, a more direct sound."

The Ten reissue sold 60,000 copies in its first week, the second biggest selling week for the album since Christmas 1993. Since Billboard considers the Ten reissue a catalog item, Ten did not appear on the Billboard 200, Top Modern Rock/Alternative, or Top Rock Albums, since those charts do not include catalog items. Had it been included on the Billboard 200, the 60,000 copies sold of the Ten reissue would have placed it at number five. The reissue also re-entered the Australian Albums Chart at number 11, giving it a new peak chart position in Australia and its highest chart placing since June 14, 1992.

Tying in with the re-release of the album in March 2009, the entire album was made available as downloadable content for the Rock Band series of video games. In addition, three Ten-era bonus tracks were made available for the Rock Band video game for those who purchased the Ten re-release through Best Buy: "Brother", "Alive", and "State of Love and Trust", the latter two as live versions taken from the band's September 20 concert.

== Critical reception ==
Professional ratings
Review scores
Source	Rating
AllMusic	5/5 stars
Blender	5/5 stars
Chicago Tribune	3/4 stars
Entertainment Weekly	B−
Mojo	4/5 stars
NME	5/10
Q	4/5 stars
The Rolling Stone Album Guide	4/5 stars
Uncut	5/5 stars
The Village Voice	B−

Ten has been met with widespread critical acclaim. In a contemporary review for Rolling Stone, music critic David Fricke praised Ten, saying that Pearl Jam "hurtles into the mystic at warp speed." He also added that Pearl Jam "wring a lot of drama out of a few declarative power chords swimming in echo." Allan Jones of Melody Maker suggested in his review of Ten that it is Vedder who provides Pearl Jam "with such a uniquely compelling focus". In Q, Dave Henderson called it "raucous modern rock, spiked with infectious guitar motifs and powered with driving bass and drums," and said it "may well be the face of the 90's metal." Stereo Review's Ron Givens said that the band "sounds larger than life, producing a towering inferno of roaring guitars, monumental bass and drums, and from-the-gut vocals." Don Kaye of Kerrang! defined the album as "introspective and charged with a quiet emotional force". Greg Kot wrote in the Chicago Tribune, "Occasionally overwrought and unrelentingly humorless, the music nonetheless exerts a hypnotic power at its best."

David Browne was less enthusiastic in Entertainment Weekly; he found Pearl Jam to be derivative of "fellow Northwestern rockers like Soundgarden, Alice in Chains, and the defunct Mother Love Bone", and felt that it "goes to show that just about anything can be harnessed and packaged." NME accused Pearl Jam of "trying to steal money from young alternative kids' pockets", with reviewer Angela Lewis deeming the band unworthy of comparisons to Nirvana and Soundgarden. Robert Christgau, writing in The Village Voice, gave the album a "B−" and viewed it as another in a "slew of Seattle albums" that "modulate the same misguided ethos", which he said was "hippie" rather than "punk". Christgau described it as "San Francisco ballroom music" whose "distinguishing characteristics" could only be discerned by listeners if they "take the right drugs". He later gave Ten a "two-star honorable mention", citing "Once" and "Even Flow" as highlights, and quipped, "in life, abuse justifies melodrama; in music, riffs work better".

Reviewing Ten in retrospect, AllMusic staff writer Steve Huey called it a "flawlessly crafted hard rock masterpiece" and felt that Vedder's "impressionistic lyrics" are more effective through his passionate vocal delivery rather than their "concrete meaning." Charles R. Cross wrote in The Rolling Stone Album Guide (2004) that Ten sounded less original and more self-important than Nirvana's Nevermind, but it also showcases the band's intricate guitar style and Vedder's distinctive singing.

=== Legacy ===
Defined by Kerrang!'s George Garner as "arguably the greatest rock debut record of all time", Ten, in 2003, was ranked number 207 on Rolling Stone's list of the 500 greatest albums of all time, and 209 in a 2012 revised list. In 2020 it was raised to the 160th position on the list, which was carried over for the 2023 edition. Readers of Q voted Ten as the 42nd greatest album ever; however, three years later the album was listed lower at 59th. In 2003, VH1 placed it at number 83 on their list of the 100 greatest albums of rock and roll. In 2006, British Hit Singles & Albums and NME organised a poll of which, 40,000 people worldwide voted for the 100 best albums ever and Ten was placed at number 66 on the list. It was also ranked number 15 in the October 2006 issue of Guitar World on the magazine's list of the 100 greatest guitar albums of all time. In 2007, the album was included at number 11 on the list of the "Definitive 200" albums of all time developed by the National Association of Recording Merchandisers. The album was also included in the book 1001 Albums You Must Hear Before You Die. In December 2020, the album was announced as one of many inducted into the Grammy Hall of Fame as part of the 2021 class. In 2022, Stuart Berman and Jeremy D. Larson of Pitchfork included the album in their list of "The 25 Best Grunge Albums of the '90s". In 2025, Em Casalena of American Songwriter included the album in the site's list of "4 Grunge Albums That Are Way Better Than Nevermind".

Accolades for Ten
Publication	Country	Accolade	Year	Rank
Guitar World	United States	"100 Greatest Guitar Albums of All Time"	2006	15
Rolling Stone	United States	"10 Greatest Debut Albums (Readers' Poll)"	2013	1
National Association of Recording Merchandisers	United States	"Definitive 200"	2007	11
Pause & Play	United States	"The 90s Top 100 Essential Albums"	1999	11
Q	United Kingdom	"100 Greatest Albums Ever"	2003	42
Q	United Kingdom	"100 Greatest Albums Ever"	2006	59
Rolling Stone	United States	"The 500 Greatest Albums of All Time"	2012	209
Spin	United States	"Top 90 Albums of the 90s"	1999	33
Spin	United States	"100 Greatest Albums, 1985–2005"	2005	93
VH1	United States	"100 Greatest Albums of Rock & Roll"	2003	83
Kerrang!	United Kingdom	"100 Albums You Must Hear Before You Die"	1998	15
Nieuwe Revu	Netherlands	"Top 100 Albums of All Time"	1994	25
Musik Express/Sounds	Germany	"The 100 Masterpieces"	1993	68
Rolling Stone	Germany	"The 500 Best Albums of All Time"	2004	20
Juice	Australia	"The 100 (+34) Greatest Albums of the 90s"	1999	101
Viceversa	Italy	"100 Rock Albums"	1996	99

== Commercial performance ==
Ten initially sold slowly upon its release, but by the second half of 1992 it became a breakthrough success, attaining an RIAA gold certification. Almost a year after its release, the album finally broke into the Top 10 of the Billboard 200 album chart on May 30, 1992, reaching number 8. Ten would eventually peak at number 2 for four weeks. It was held off the top spot by the Billy Ray Cyrus album, Some Gave All. The album spent a total of 264 weeks on the Billboard charts, making it one of the Top 15 charting albums ever. By February 1993, American sales of Ten surpassed those of Nevermind, the breakthrough album by fellow grunge band Nirvana. Ten continued to sell well two years after its release; in 1993 it was the eighth best-selling album in the United States, outselling Pearl Jam's second album, Vs. As of February 2013, Ten has sold 13 million copies in the United States according to Nielsen SoundScan, and has been certified 13× platinum by the RIAA.

Ten produced three hit singles: "Alive", "Even Flow", and "Jeremy", all of which had accompanying music videos (The music video for "Oceans" was released only outside of the U.S.). The singles all placed on the Mainstream Rock and Modern Rock charts. The song "Black" reached number 3 on the Mainstream Rock chart, despite never being released as a commercial single. The video for "Alive" was nominated for the MTV Video Music Award for Best Alternative Video in 1992. "Jeremy" became one of Pearl Jam's best-known songs, and received nominations for Best Rock Song and Best Hard Rock Performance at the 1993 Grammy awards. The video for "Jeremy", directed by Mark Pellington, was put into heavy rotation by MTV and became a huge hit, receiving five nominations at the 1993 MTV Video Music Awards, of which it won four, including Video of the Year and Best Group Video.

== Track listing ==
=== Original release ===
All lyrics are written by Eddie Vedder.

Ten track listing
No.	Title	Music	Length
1.	"Once" (includes unlisted track (Note: The original compact disc opens and closes with a hidden instrumental, "Master/Slave", creating a continuum effect if the disc is looped. The majority of instrumental starts at 5:18 after "Release".))	Stone Gossard	3:51
2.	"Even Flow"	Gossard	4:53
3.	"Alive"	Gossard	5:41
4.	"Why Go"	Jeff Ament	3:20
5.	"Black"	Gossard	5:43
6.	"Jeremy"	Ament	5:18
7.	"Oceans"	Vedder; Gossard; Ament	2:42
8.	"Porch"	Vedder	3:30
9.	"Garden"	Gossard; Ament	4:59
10.	"Deep"	Gossard; Ament	4:18
11.	"Release" (includes hidden track)	Vedder; Gossard; Ament; Mike McCready; Dave Krusen	9:05
Total length:			53:20

Note

European edition bonus tracks
No.	Title	Music	Length
12.	"Alive" (live on August 3, 1991, at RKCNDY in Seattle, Washington)	Gossard	4:54
13.	"Wash"	Gossard; Ament; Krusen; McCready; Vedder	3:33
14.	"Dirty Frank"	Gossard; Ament; Dave Abbruzzese; McCready	5:38
Total length:			67:25

Japanese bonus tracks
No.	Title	Writer(s)	Length
12.	"I've Got a Feeling"	Lennon–McCartney	3:42
13.	"Master/Slave"	Ament; Vedder	3:48
Total length:			60:50

Reissue bonus tracks
No.	Title	Music	Length
12.	"Brother" (with vocals)	Gossard	3:59
13.	"Just a Girl" (Mookie Blaylock demo 1990)	Gossard	5:01
14.	"Breath and a Scream" (Mookie Blaylock demo 1990)	Gossard	5:58
15.	"State of Love and Trust" (Demo 1991)	McCready; Ament	4:47
16.	"2,000 Mile Blues"	Ament; McCready; Krusen	3:57
17.	"Evil Little Goat"	Gossard; Ament; Krusen; McCready; Vedder	1:27
Total length:			78:29

iTunes reissue bonus tracks (December 31, 1992, at The Academy Theater in New York City)
No.	Title	Music	Length
18.	"Why Go"	Ament	4:01
19.	"Even Flow"	Gossard	5:10
20.	"Alone"	Abbruzzese; Ament; Gossard; McCready; Vedder	3:26
21.	"Garden"	Gossard; Ament	5:42
Total length:			96:48

=== Momma-Son cassette ===
All lyrics are written by Vedder; all music is composed by Gossard.

Momma-Son track listing
No.	Title	Length
1.	"Alive"	4:35
2.	"Once"	3:44
3.	"Footsteps"	4:20

=== Drop in the Park LP ===
All lyrics are written by Vedder.

Side one
No.	Title	Music	Length
1.	"Even Flow"	Gossard	5:14
2.	"Once"	Gossard	3:32
3.	"State of Love and Trust"	McCready; Ament	3:44
4.	"Why Go"	Ament	3:20

Side two
No.	Title	Music	Length
1.	"Deep"	Gossard; Ament	4:22
2.	"Jeremy"	Ament	5:03
3.	"Black"	Gossard	5:28

Side three
No.	Title	Music	Length
1.	"Alive"	Gossard	5:50
2.	"Garden"	Gossard; Ament	5:35

Side four
No.	Title	Music	Length
1.	"Porch"	Vedder	12:42

== Personnel ==
Pearl Jam

- Dave Krusen – drums; timpani on "Oceans"
- Jeff Ament – fretless bass, 8-string bass; 12-string bass on "Why Go", "Jeremy", and "Deep"
- Eddie Vedder – vocals
- Mike McCready – lead guitar
- Stone Gossard – rhythm guitar

Additional musicians

- Rick Parashar – piano, organ, percussion
- Walter Gray – cello
- Tim Palmer – fire extinguisher and pepper shaker on "Oceans"

Production

- Pearl Jam – production
- Rick Parashar – production, engineering
- Tim Palmer – mixing
- Dave Hillis – additional engineering
- Don Gilmore – additional engineering
- Adrian Moore – additional engineering
- Bob Ludwig – mastering

Artwork

- Jeff Ament – art direction/concept
- Risa Zaitschek – design
- Lisa Sparagano – design
- Lance Mercer – photos
- Steve Pitstick – additional art
- Eddie Vedder – additional art

== Charts ==
=== Original release ===
Weekly chart performance for Ten by Pearl Jam
Chart (1991–1996)	Peak position
Australian Albums (ARIA)	14
Austrian Albums (Ö3 Austria)	31
Canadian Albums (RPM)	2
Dutch Albums (Album Top 100)	14
Finnish Albums The Official Finnish Charts	14
German Albums (Offizielle Top 100)	15
New Zealand Albums (RMNZ)	3
Norwegian Albums (VG-lista)	8
Swedish Albums (Sverigetopplistan)	9
UK Albums (Official Charts)	18
US Billboard 200	2
US Heatseekers Albums (Billboard)	2

Chart (2020–2026)	Peak position
Belgian Albums (Ultratop Flanders)	17
Belgian Albums (Ultratop Wallonia)	101
Croatian International Albums (HDU)	15
Portuguese Albums (AFP)	12
US Top Rock Albums (Billboard)	7

Weekly chart performance for the 2009 re-release of Ten
Chart (2009)	Peak position
Australian Albums (ARIA)	11
Croatian Albums Chart	24
Irish Albums (IRMA)	38
Italian Albums (FIMI)	20
Portuguese Albums (AFP)	2
Swiss Albums (Schweizer Hitparade)	67
US Top Internet Albums (Billboard)	1

Chart (2014–2025)	Position
Hungarian Physical Albums (MAHASZ)	29
Polish Albums (OLiS)	1

=== Year-end charts ===
Year-end chart performance for Ten by Pearl Jam
Chart (1992)	Position
Canadian Albums (RPM)	12
Dutch Albums (Album Top 100)	15
German Albums (Offizielle Top 100)	46
UK Albums (OCC)	79
US Billboard 200	11

Chart (1993)	Position
Canadian Albums (RPM)	48
Dutch Albums (Album Top 100)	56
New Zealand Albums (RMNZ)	11
UK Albums (OCC)	94
US Billboard 200	8

Chart (1994)	Position
Australian Albums (ARIA)	62
Dutch Albums (Album Top 100)	71
New Zealand Albums (RMNZ)	23
UK Albums (OCC)	128
US Billboard 200	58

Chart (1995)	Position
Australian Albums (ARIA)	49
US Billboard 200	106

Chart (1996)	Position
US Billboard 200	185

Chart (2002)	Position
Canadian Alternative Albums (Nielsen SoundScan)	167
Canadian Metal Albums (Nielsen SoundScan)	85

Chart (2019)	Position
Belgian Albums (Ultratop Flanders)	78

Chart (2020)	Position
Belgian Albums (Ultratop Flanders)	84

Chart (2021)	Position
Belgian Albums (Ultratop Flanders)	121
US Top Rock Albums (Billboard)	67

Chart (2022)	Position
Belgian Albums (Ultratop Flanders)	137

Chart (2023)	Position
Belgian Albums (Ultratop Flanders)	123

Chart (2024)	Position
Belgian Albums (Ultratop Flanders)	97

Chart (2025)	Position
Belgian Albums (Ultratop Flanders)	104
Dutch Albums (Album Top 100)	94

=== Decade-end charts ===
Decade-end chart performance for Ten
Chart (1990–1999)	Position
US Billboard 200	14

== Certifications ==
Certifications for Ten
Region	Certification	Certified units/sales
Argentina (CAPIF) Re-release edition	Gold	20,000^{^}
Australia (ARIA)	8× Platinum	560,000^{‡}
Belgium (BRMA)	Platinum	50,000^{*}
Brazil (Pro-Música Brasil)	Gold	100,000^{*}
Canada (Music Canada)	7× Platinum	700,000^{‡}
Denmark (IFPI Danmark)	3× Platinum	60,000^{‡}
Germany (BVMI)	Gold	250,000^{^}
Italy (FIMI) sales since 2009	2× Platinum	100,000^{‡}
Netherlands (NVPI)	Platinum	100,000^{^}
New Zealand (RMNZ)	6× Platinum	90,000^{^}
Norway (IFPI Norway)	Gold	25,000^{*}
Poland (ZPAV)	2× Platinum	40,000^{‡}
Portugal (AFP)	Gold	20,000^{^}
Sweden (GLF)	Gold	50,000^{^}
Switzerland (IFPI Switzerland)	Gold	25,000^{^}
United Kingdom (BPI)	2× Platinum	600,000^{‡}
United States (RIAA)	13× Platinum	13,000,000^{^}
^{*} Sales figures based on certification alone.^{^} Shipments figures based on certification alone.^{‡} Sales+streaming figures based on certification alone.

== See also ==
- List of 1991 albums
- List of 1990s albums considered the best
- List of best-selling albums in the United States
