= Claytown Troupe =

English alternative rock band

- Claytown Troupe performing in 2026

Background information
- Origin: Bristol, Bath, Weston-super-Mare, England
- Genres: Gothic rock, post-punk, alternative rock
- Years active: 1984–present
- Labels: Island Records; EMI Records; Bristol Archive Records
- Members: Christian Riou; Damon Williams; Mark Stratton; David Weiss
- Past members: Richard Williams; Adrian Bennett; Andy Holt; Paul Waterson; Ben Christo
- Website: claytowntroupe.co.uk

Claytown Troupe are an English alternative rock band from Bristol who formed in 1984.

== Early history – 1984 – 1988 ==
The Claytown Troupe were formed in 1984 in Bristol by lead singer Christian Riou, who claimed in an NME interview that a local clairvoyant advised him to form a band called "the Clayton Troop" who would have success internationally and spend time in America.

Between 1985 and 1987 the band were active on the Bristol live circuit supporting acts that included Fields of the Nephilim, Alien Sex Fiend and Chiefs of Relief. The line up changed in late 1987, and a new set of songs was written which became the album Through the Veil. After recruiting guitarist Adrian Bennett and bassist Paul Waterson they played as supporting act such as Salvation and Lightning Strikes.

During the summer of 1988 the band were included, along with The Wedding Present, The Trudy and The Hunters Club, on a 4-track EP on the cover of House of Dolls magazine. They also filmed a promotional video for the song "Prayer".

== Island Records – 1988 – 1991 ==
In September 1988 they signed to Island Records by Ron Fair, who also produced the debut album, Through the Veil with extra mixes by Ralph Jezzard.

With a major record deal behind them but no manager, they met small label owner Steve 'Abbo' Abbott (ex.UK Decay vocalist) and decided a sixth member rather an established team would help build the band, so asked him to switch to management for them.

The album was released in October 1989, reaching No. 72 on the UK Albums Chart .

Through the Veil spawned three top 100 UK singles – "Prayer" UK 79, "Hey Lord" UK 86 and "Real Life" UK 85.

They were played as support band for The Cult's Sonic Temple tour at Wembley Arena and Birmingham's National Exhibition Centre.

Later they toured with Pearl Jam, The Wonder Stuff, The Damned, Julian Cope, Jesus Jones, The Godfathers, and The Mission, as well as playing the Los Angeles Foundations Forum, which also featured Ozzy Osbourne and Soundgarden.

The band were dropped from Island Records after the company was sold to Polygram. Subsequently, they signed to EMI Records USA, where the second album Out There (1991), was produced by David Bianco at New York's The Hit Factory.

== EMI Records – 1991 – 1992 ==
'Out There' spawned two top 75 UK singles – "Ways of Love" UK No. 57, "Wanted It All" UK No. 74.

In 1992 as guests of Pearl Jam on their Ten Tour the band were transferred to EMI UK after the US label was taken over by Zomba.

== Reformation – 2004 ==
In 2004, Claytown Troupe were invited to perform at the Whitby Gothic Weekend, which led to renewed interest in the band. They then played a handful of gigs in late 2004 with interim members Clive Murray (guitar), Chris Sharp (bass) and Dan Roth (drums).

In 2008, the band were guests of The Mission at the Shepherd's Bush Empire.

== 2013 ==
The band were joined by drummer Phil Martini (Wayward Sons, Spear of Destiny and Joe Elliott's Down 'n' Outz) to play the Camden Rocks festival, with headliners The Rifles and Therapy?.

== 2014 ==
The band played the Bristol Fleece, 22 years since their last hometown gig.

== 2018 ==
Bristol Archive Records released the original 1988 demos.

== 2024 ==
Claytown Troupe were part of the bill with The Mission and The Chameleons at the 'From the Oyster Comes the Pearl' alternative rock festival in Dubai on 23 November 2024.

== 2025 ==
During 2025, the current Claytown Troupe lineup supported:

The Godfathers at the Garage, London.

Spear of Destiny at the 100 Club in London, and in Cardiff and Brighton.

Gene Loves Jezebel in Oxford and Birmingham, and at The Lexington, London.

Darkfest, an alternative rock festival in Wolverhampton, with Balaam and the Angel.

They were also announced as support for Fields of the Nephilim in October 2025, in Manchester, Glasgow (with Balaam and the Angel), and at the Forum in London.

== Discography ==
=== Singles ===
- "Prayer" (1989) No. 78
- "Hey Lord" (1989) No. 86
- "Real Life" (1990) No. 85
- "Ways of Love" (1990) – UK No. 57
- "Wanted It All" (1992) – UK No. 74
- 'Skybound' (1992) Unreleased

=== Albums ===
- Through the Veil (1989) (Island) – UK No. 72
- Out There (1991) (EMI)
