= Pearl Jam 2012 Tour =

2012 concert tour by Pearl Jam

- Tour by Pearl Jam
- Location: Europe; North America
- Start date: June 20, 2012
- End date: September 30, 2012
- Legs: 2
- No. of shows: 13 in Europe; 4 in North America; 17 in total

Pearl Jam concert chronology
- Pearl Jam Twenty Tour (2011); Pearl Jam 2012 Tour (2012); Lightning Bolt Tour (2013–14)

The Pearl Jam 2012 Tour was a concert tour by the American rock band Pearl Jam. The first leg of the tour consisted of thirteen shows in Europe, including a headlining appearance at the Isle of Wight Festival. American punk band X were the opening band for the arena shows. Due to high ticket demand for pre-sale tickets, the third-party website handling the sale had to be taken offline. The Pearl Jam fanclub cited "an act of sabotage" to the site. For the second show at the Ziggo Dome in Amsterdam, a fan of the band created the setlist.

In May 2012, Pearl Jam announced they were playing three festival dates in the US, including a headlining slot at Jay-Z's Made in America Music Festival. In June 2012, the band announced they would be playing at the Adams Centre in Missoula, Montana. This was scheduled to be the band's only non-festival show in the United States in 2012.

At the Made in America Festival, Pearl Jam were joined onstage by Jay Z to perform the song "99 Problems". For their appearance at Made in America, the band earned $2 million. Some of the footage of Pearl Jam's set featured in the 2013 documentary film Made in America, directed by Ron Howard.

== Opening acts ==
- X (excluding festivals)
- Mudhoney (Missoula only)

== Tour dates ==
Date	City	Country	Venue
Europe
June 20, 2012	Manchester	England	Manchester Arena
June 21, 2012	Manchester	England	Manchester Arena
June 23, 2012^{[A]}	Isle of Wight	England	Seaclose Park
June 26, 2012	Amsterdam	Netherlands	Ziggo Dome
June 27, 2012	Amsterdam	Netherlands	Ziggo Dome
June 29, 2012^{[B]}	Werchter	Belgium	Werchter Festival Grounds
June 30, 2012^{[C]}	Arras	France	Citadelle Vauban
July 2, 2012	Prague	Czech Republic	O_{2} Arena
July 4, 2012	Berlin	Germany	O_{2} World Berlin
July 5, 2012	Berlin	Germany	O_{2} World Berlin
July 7, 2012	Stockholm	Sweden	Ericsson Globe
July 9, 2012	Oslo	Norway	Oslo Spektrum
July 10, 2012	Copenhagen	Denmark	Forum Copenhagen
North America
September 2, 2012^{[D]}	Philadelphia	United States	Fairmount Park
September 21, 2012^{[E]}	Pensacola	United States	Pensacola Beach
September 22, 2012^{[F]}	Atlanta	United States	Piedmont Park
September 30, 2012	Missoula	United States	Adams Centre

Festivals and other miscellaneous performances
^{A} This concert is a part of "Isle of Wight Festival"
^{B} This concert is a part of "Rock Werchter"
^{C} This concert is a part of "Main Square Festival"
^{D} This concert is a part of "Budweiser Made in America Festival"
^{E} This concert is a part of "De Luna Festival"
^{F} This concert is a part of "Music Midtown Festival"

== Band members ==
Pearl Jam

- Jeff Ament – bass guitar
- Stone Gossard – rhythm guitar, lead guitar
- Mike McCready – lead guitar
- Eddie Vedder – lead vocals, guitar
- Matt Cameron – drums

Additional musicians

- Boom Gaspar – Hammond B3 and keyboards

== Gallery ==
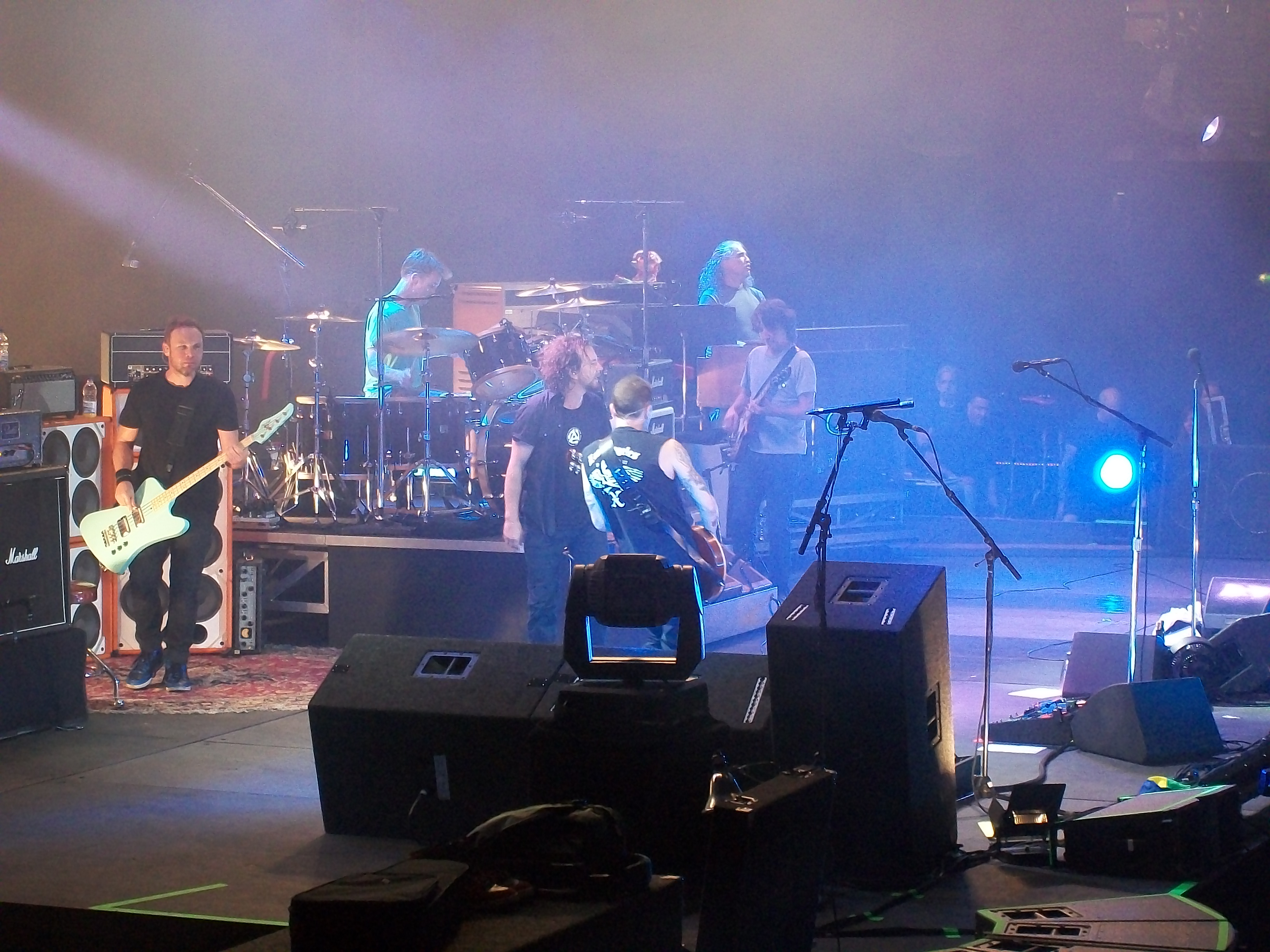
Pearl Jam at the Manchester Arena, Manchester, England on June 20, 2012

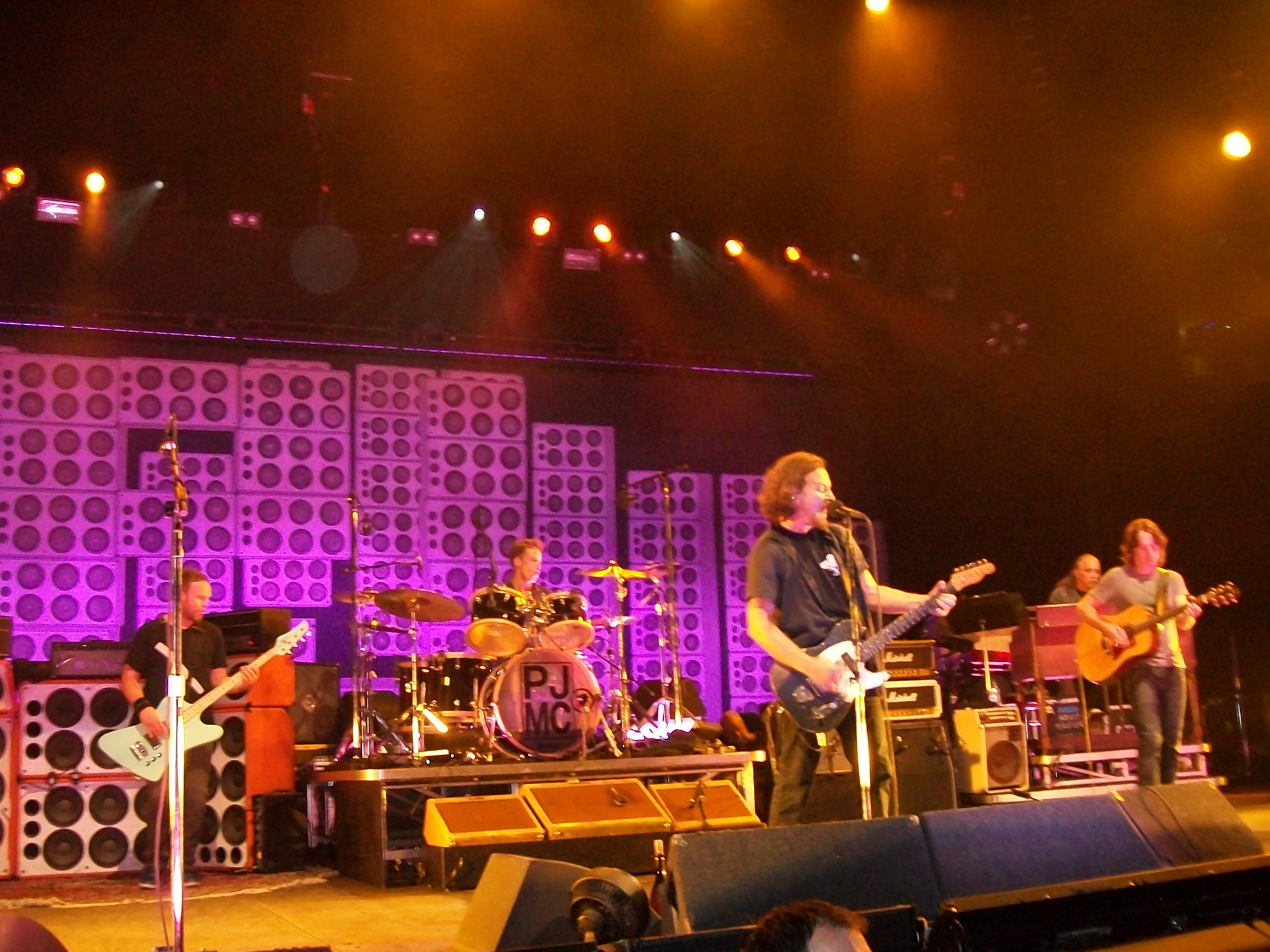
Pearl Jam at the Manchester Arena, Manchester, England on June 21, 2012

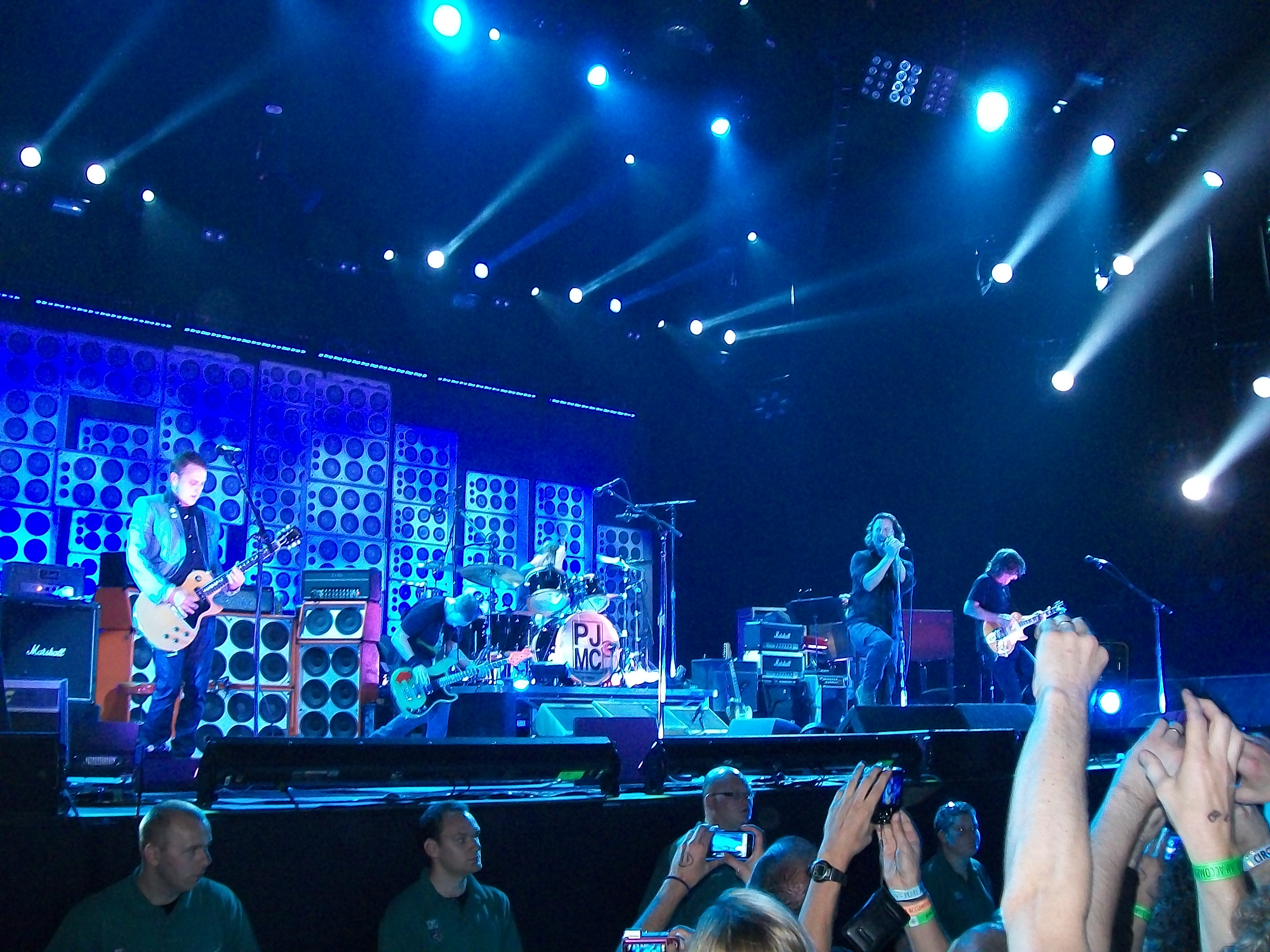
Pearl Jam at the Ziggo Dome, Amsterdam, Netherlands on June 26, 2012

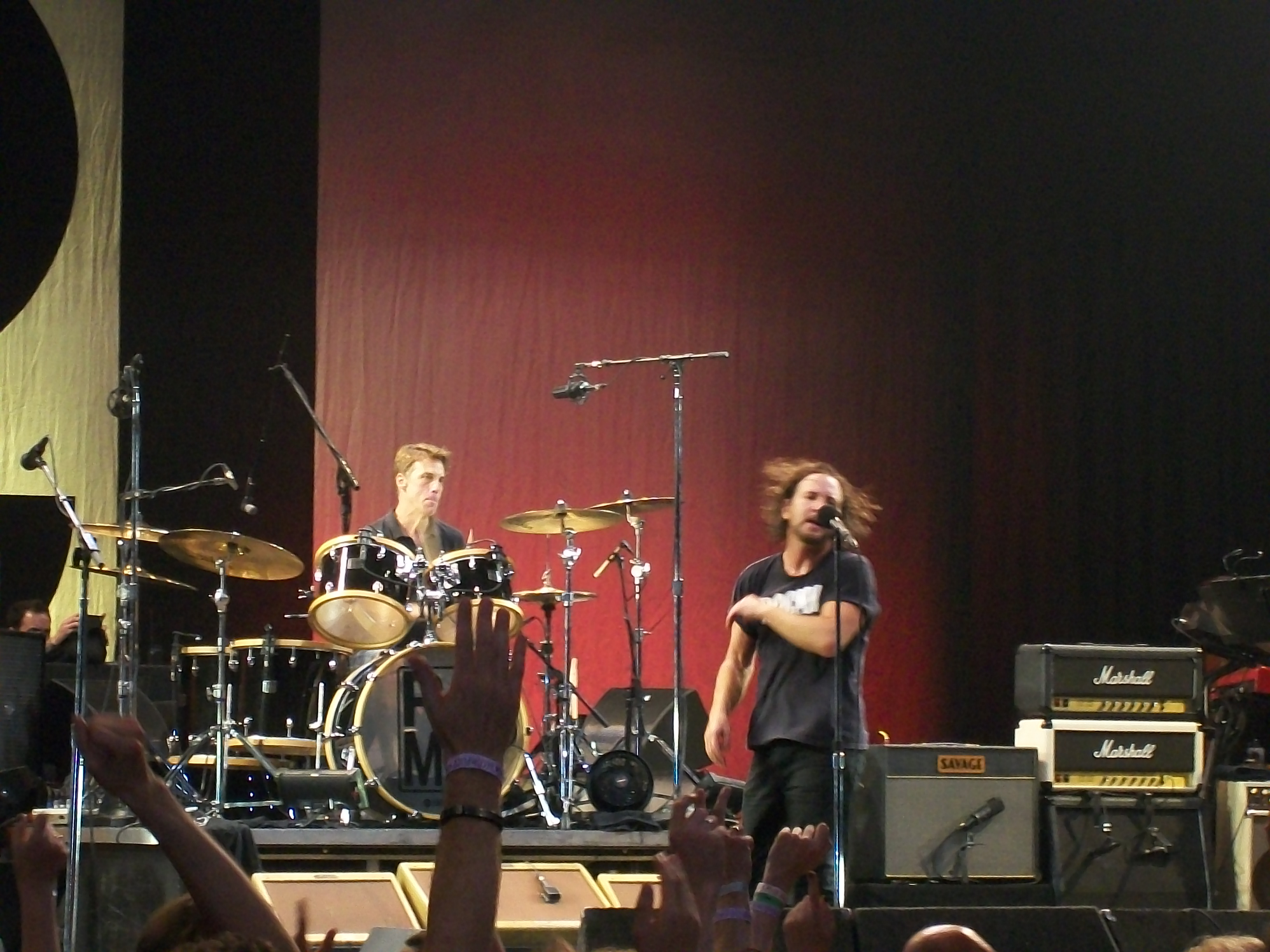
Matt Cameron (drums) and Eddie Vedder in Berlin on July 4, 2012

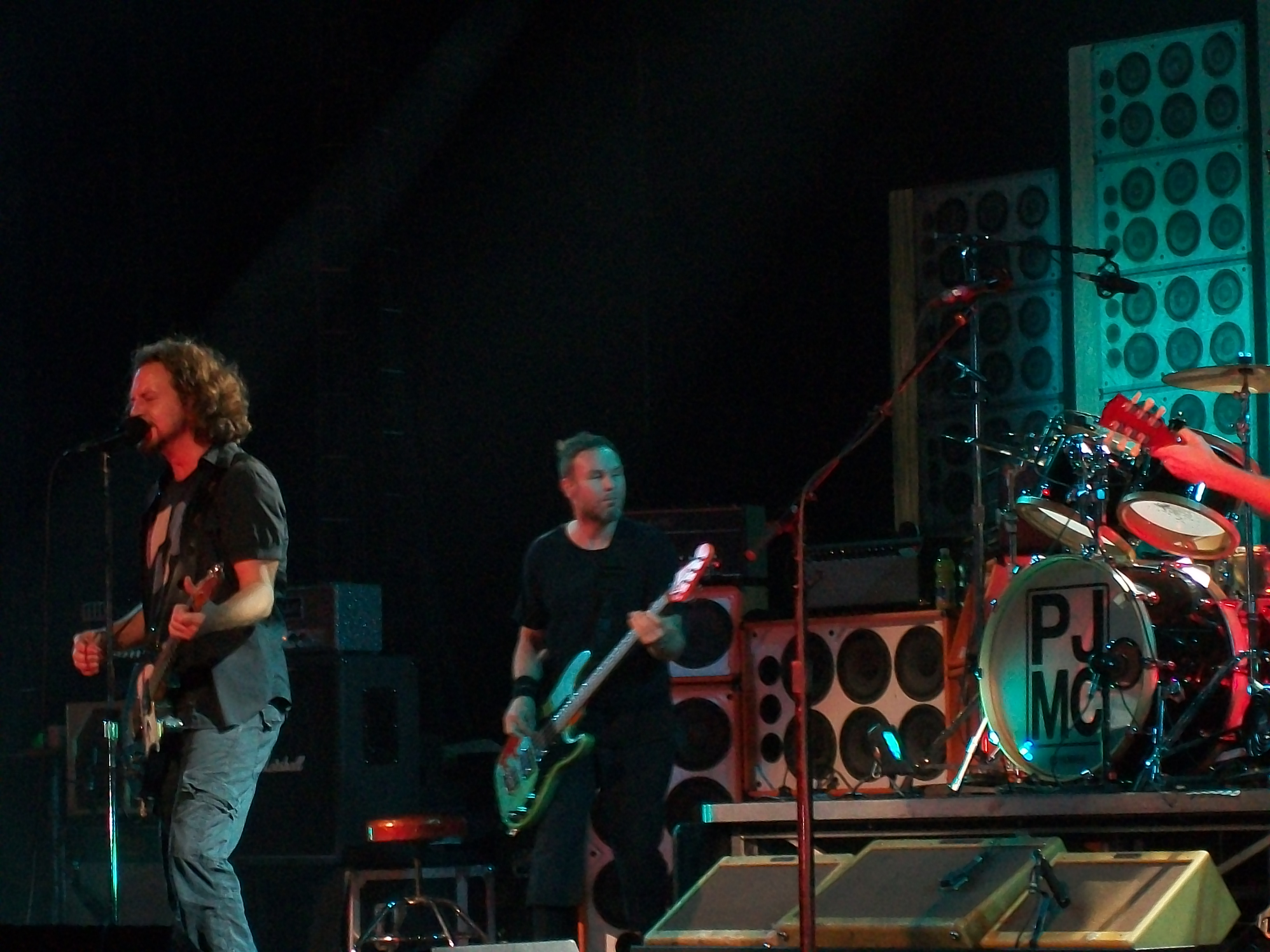
Eddie Vedder (front) and Jeff Ament (bass) in Berlin on July 5, 2012

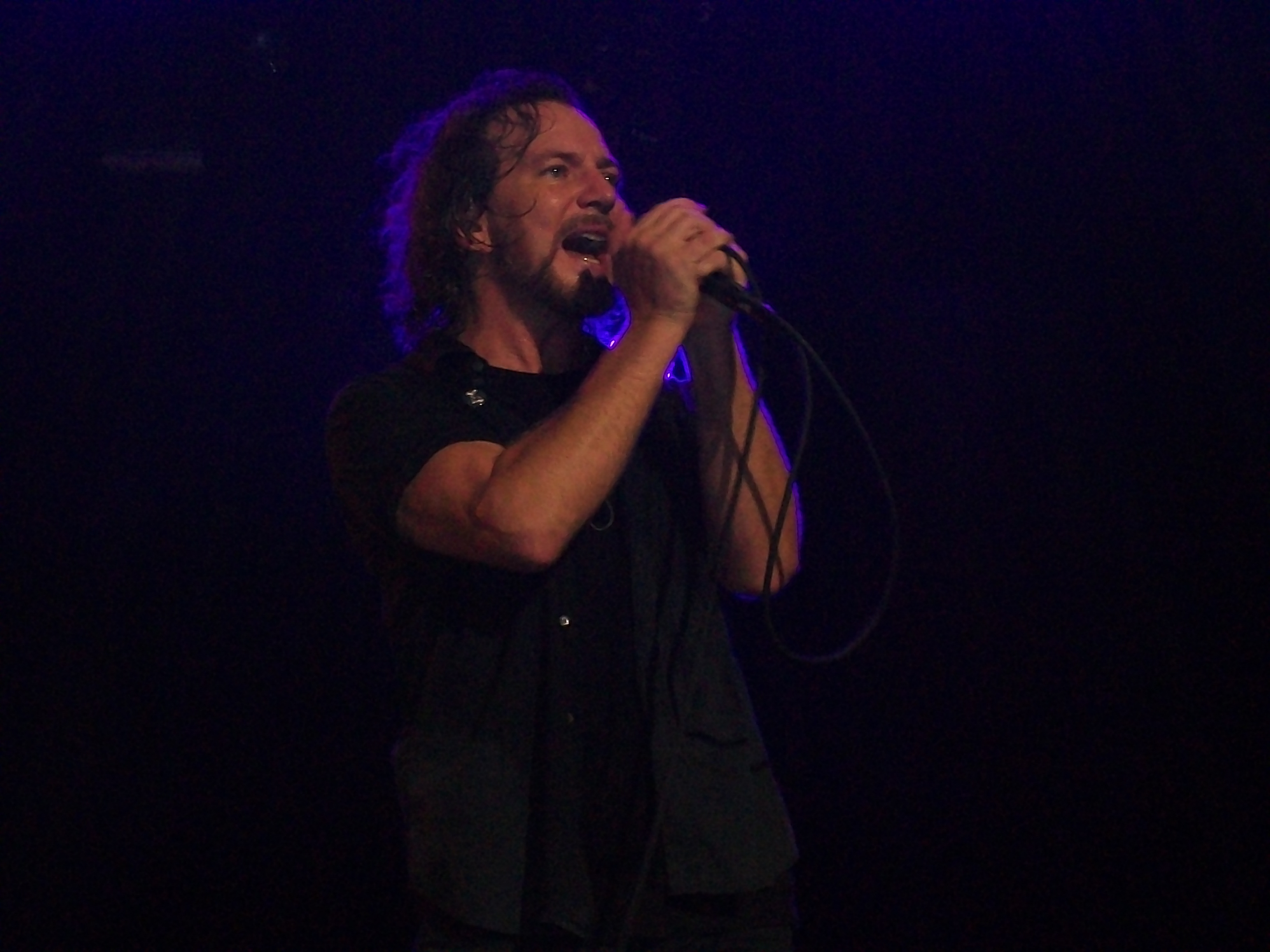
Eddie Vedder in Stockholm on July 7, 2012

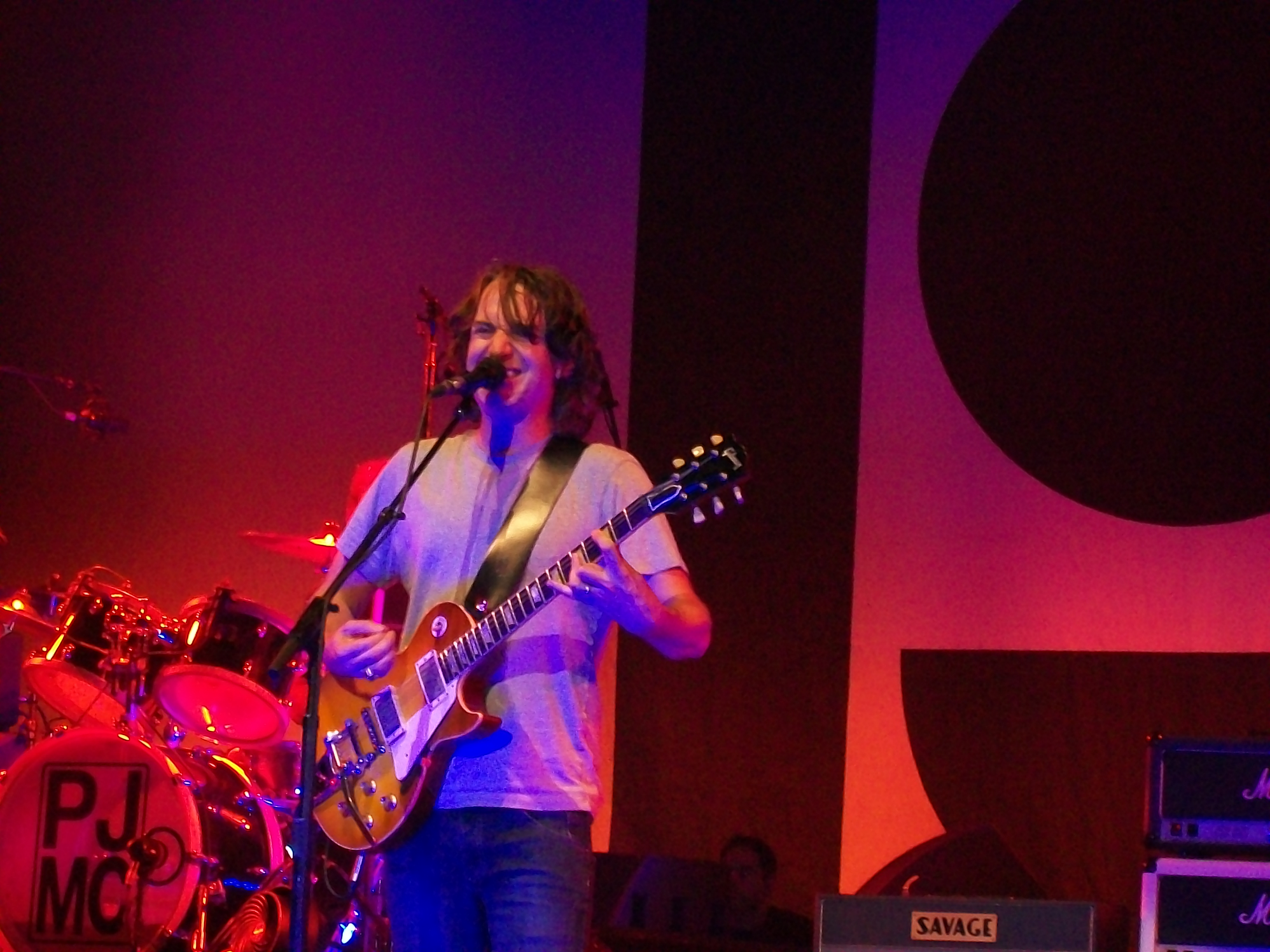
Stone Gossard playing the song "Mankind" in Oslo on July 9, 2012

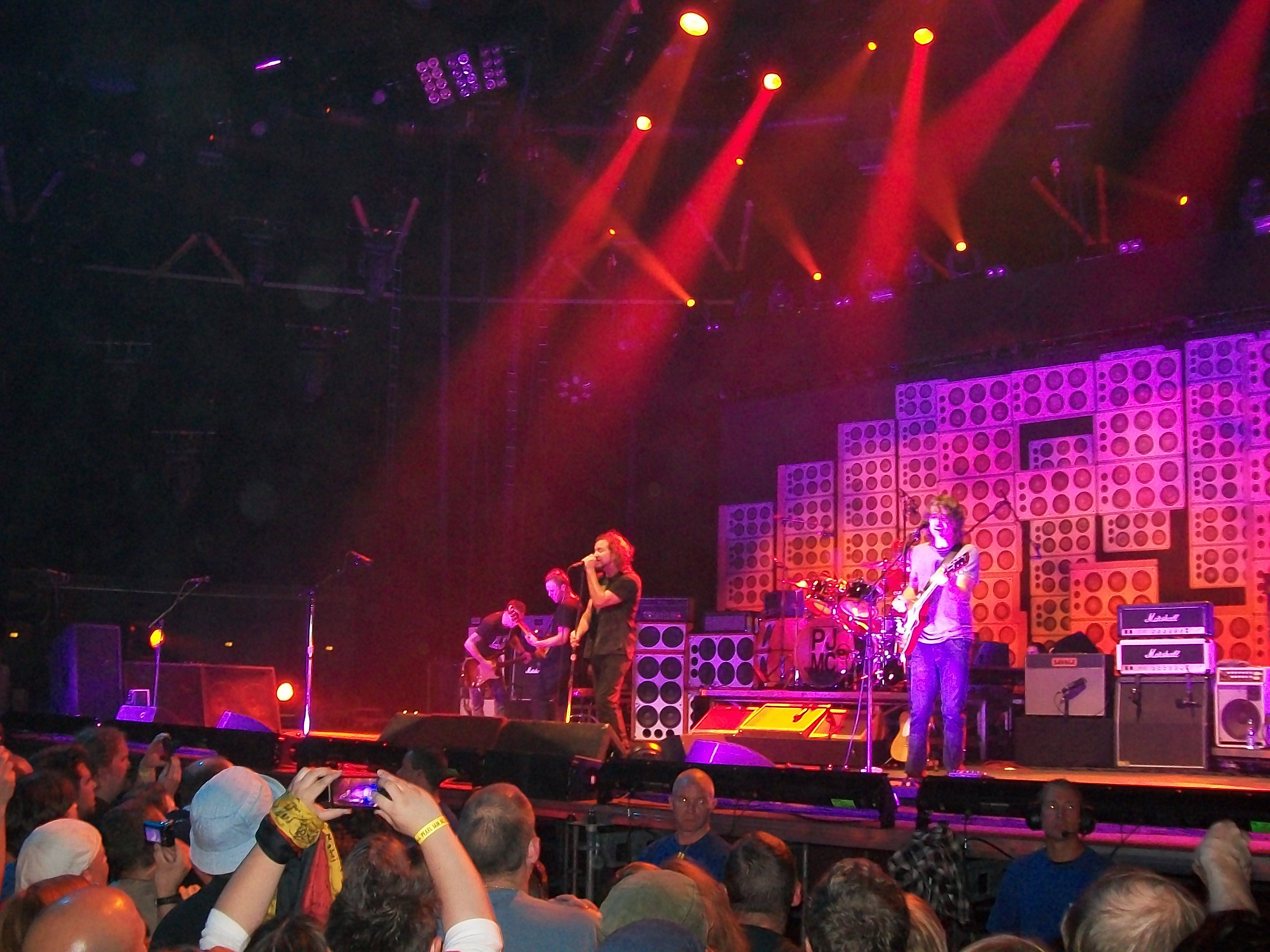
Pearl Jam in Copenhagen on July 10, 2012
