= Vote for Change? 2004 =

- Directed by: Rick Charnoski; Coan Nichols
- Written by: Rick Charnoski; Coan Nichols; Rick Nichols; Nancy Szokan
- Produced by: Rick Charnoski; Coan Nichols
- Starring: Jeff Ament; Stone Gossard; Mike McCready; Matt Cameron; Eddie Vedder; Boom Gaspar
- Cinematography: Rick Charnoski; Coan Nichols
- Edited by: Rick Charnoski; Coan Nichols
- Music by: Pearl Jam
- Distributed by: Ten Club
- Release date: October 31, 2008
- Running time: 67 minutes
- Country: United States
- Language: English

Vote for Change? 2004 is a 2008 American documentary film produced and directed by Rick Charnoski and Coan Nichols. It follows the American alternative rock band Pearl Jam on the 2004 Vote for Change tour.

== Plot ==
The film follows Pearl Jam on the 2004 Vote for Change tour, a politically motivated American popular music concert tour that took place in October 2004. The live performance footage of Pearl Jam is intercut with interviews with the members of the band, its fans, and people on the street about voting and politics. The film's timespan runs from just prior to the start of the tour to Election Day 2004.

== Production ==
In April 2004, independent filmmakers Rick Charnoski and Coan Nichols met Pearl Jam bassist Jeff Ament. Ament had been a fan of the filmmakers' skateboarding films (Fruit of the Vine, Northwest, Tent City, etc.). He asked them if they would be interested in working with Pearl Jam, and mentioned that the band would be going out on the Vote for Change tour prior to the 2004 presidential election.

The filmmakers began shooting in October 2004 in Seattle, Washington at Pearl Jam's rehearsal sessions. They traveled with Pearl Jam through Reading, Pennsylvania, Toledo, Ohio, Grand Rapids, Michigan, St. Louis, Missouri, Asheville, North Carolina and Kissimmee, Florida. The film was shot entirely in Super-8. The soundtrack was recorded and mixed by Pearl Jam's sound engineer, Brett Eliason.

== Release ==
After the tour, Charnoski and Nichols edited the film, but held off on releasing it due to the outcome of the 2004 election. Charnoski and Nichols said that they decided to release the film before the 2008 presidential election to "remind people why it is so important to vote." The film was released digitally and for free through Pearl Jam's official website in the days prior to Election Day 2008. Pearl Jam's official website offered a contest for Pearl Jam fans to host their own movie premieres on November 3, 2008. Among the prizes for the 50 winners were DVDs of the film.
