= MTV Unplugged (Pearl Jam album) =

Pearl Jam album

Live album by Pearl Jam
- Released: November 29, 2019
- Recorded: March 16, 1992
- Venue: Kaufman Astoria (Queens)
- Genre: Grunge; acoustic rock
- Length: 35:46
- Label: Legacy

Pearl Jam chronology
Let's Play Two (2017)	MTV Unplugged (2019)	Gigaton (2020)

Professional ratings
Review scores
Source	Rating
AllMusic	4/5 stars

MTV Unplugged is a live album by the American rock band Pearl Jam. Originally recorded on March 16, 1992, for the MTV television series MTV Unplugged, it was released to the public on October 23, 2020. Initially given a limited release in November 2019 as part of Record Store Day on limited edition vinyl, it is the first time that the band's MTV Unplugged performance has been released on both vinyl and CD.

The actual full concert length is around 50:43. Pearl Jam also performed "Rockin' in the Free World" which is not included on the video, CD or vinyl. The track order is also incorrect on the release version. The last 2 tracks, "Even Flow" and "Porch", are reversed and then "Rockin' in the Free World" is the last song performed.

== Track listing ==
All lyrics are written by Eddie Vedder; all music is composed by Stone Gossard, except where noted.

MTV Unplugged track listing
No.	Title	Music	Length
1.	"Oceans"	Vedder, Gossard, Jeff Ament	4:01
2.	"State of Love and Trust"	Ament, Mike McCready	3:44
3.	"Alive"		5:31
4.	"Black"		5:31
5.	"Jeremy"	Ament	5:20
6.	"Even Flow"		5:23
7.	"Porch"	Vedder	6:19
Total length:			35:46

== Personnel ==
Personnel taken from MTV Unplugged liner notes.

Pearl Jam

- Eddie Vedder – vocals
- Mike McCready – lead guitar
- Stone Gossard – rhythm guitar
- Jeff Ament – bass guitar
- Dave Abbruzzese – drums

Additional personnel

- David Hewit – audio recording
- Ken Hahn – audio recording
- Nick DiDia – mixing
- Tom Tapley – mix assistant
- Bob Ludwig – mastering

== Charts ==
Chart performance for MTV Unplugged
Chart (2019–2020)	Peak position
Australian Albums (ARIA)	20
Austrian Albums (Ö3 Austria)	55
Belgian Albums (Ultratop Flanders)	45
Belgian Albums (Ultratop Wallonia)	120
Dutch Albums (Album Top 100)	33
German Albums (Offizielle Top 100)	75
Italian Albums (FIMI)	24
Portuguese Albums (AFP)	4
Swiss Albums (Schweizer Hitparade)	35
US Billboard 200	47
