= Let's Play Two =

2017 live album by Pearl Jam

Live album by Pearl Jam
- Released: September 29, 2017 (album); November 17, 2017 (film)
- Recorded: August 20 and 22, 2016
- Genre: Alternative rock; grunge
- Length: 79:42
- Label: Republic

Pearl Jam chronology
Lightning Bolt (2013)	Let's Play Two (2017)	MTV Unplugged (2019)

Professional ratings
Review scores
Source	Rating
The Daily Vault	B+

Let's Play Two is a live album and concert film by American alternative rock band Pearl Jam. The album was released on September 29, 2017, with the concert film being released on November 17, 2017. The footage and songs were recorded at the band's shows on August 20 and August 22, 2016 at Wrigley Field in Chicago during their 2016 tour.

== Track listing ==
Audio

All lyrics are written by Eddie Vedder, except where noted.

Let's Play Two track listing
No.	Title	Lyrics	Music	Length
1.	"Low Light"	Jeff Ament	Ament	3:16
2.	"Better Man"		Vedder	5:15
3.	"Elderly Woman Behind the Counter in a Small Town"		Vedder, Ament, Stone Gossard, Mike McCready, Dave Abbruzzese	3:26
4.	"Last Exit"		Gossard, Vedder, Ament, McCready, Abbruzzese	2:34
5.	"Lightning Bolt"		Vedder	5:42
6.	"Black, Red, Yellow"		Vedder	2:55
7.	"Black"		Gossard	7:50
8.	"Corduroy"		Vedder, Ament, Gossard, McCready, Abbruzzese	6:04
9.	"Given to Fly"		McCready	3:25
10.	"Jeremy"		Ament	5:01
11.	"Inside Job"	McCready	McCready, Vedder	5:54
12.	"Go"		Abbruzzese, Gossard, Ament, McCready, Vedder	2:49
13.	"Crazy Mary"	Victoria Williams	Williams	6:22
14.	"Release"		Ament, Dave Krusen, Gossard, McCready, Vedder	5:29
15.	"Alive"		Gossard	6:04
16.	"All the Way"		Vedder	4:02
17.	"I've Got a Feeling"	Lennon-McCartney	Lennon-McCartney	3:36

Video

1. "Low Light"
2. "Better Man"
3. "Elderly Woman Behind the Counter in a Small Town"
4. "Last Exit"
5. "Lightning Bolt"
6. "Black, Red, Yellow"
7. "Black
8. "Corduroy"
9. "Given to Fly"
10. "Jeremy"
11. "Inside Job"
12. "Go
13. "Crazy Mary"
14. "Release"
15. "Alive"
16. "All the Way"
17. "I've Got a Feeling"

Bonus tracks

1. "Black"
2. "Mind Your Manners"
3. "Masters of War"
4. "Rearviewmirror"
5. "Immortality"
6. "Lukin'" (hidden track)

== Personnel ==
Pearl Jam

- Eddie Vedder – vocals, guitar
- Jeff Ament – bass guitar
- Matt Cameron – drums
- Stone Gossard – guitar
- Mike McCready – guitar

Additional musicians

- Boom Gaspar – Hammond organ

Technical personnel

- Ed Brooks – mastering
- John Burton – recording
- Danny Clinch – liner notes and photos
- Brett Eliason – mixing
- Joe Spix – layout and design

== Charts ==
Weekly chart performance for Let's Play Two
Chart (2017)	Peak position
Australian Albums (ARIA)	45
Austrian Albums (Ö3 Austria)	55
Belgian Albums (Ultratop Flanders)	25
Belgian Albums (Ultratop Wallonia)	51
Dutch Albums (Album Top 100)	48
French Albums (SNEP)	136
German Albums (Offizielle Top 100)	37
Irish Albums (IRMA)	51
Italian Albums (FIMI)	21
New Zealand Heatseeker Albums (RMNZ)	7
Portuguese Albums (AFP)	7
Scottish Albums (OCC)	45
Spanish Albums (PROMUSICAE)	21
Swiss Albums (Schweizer Hitparade)	91
US Billboard 200	31
