= Pearl Jam 1991 United States Tour =

1991 concert tour by Pearl Jam

1991 United States Tour
- Tour by Pearl Jam
- Location: United States
- Associated album: Ten
- Start date: July 10, 1991
- End date: July 21, 1991
- No. of shows: 5

Pearl Jam concert chronology
- Mookie Blaylock 1991 United States Tour (1991); 1991 United States Tour (1991); Ten Tour (1991–92)

The Pearl Jam 1991 United States Tour was a concert tour by the American rock band Pearl Jam. It was the band's first tour since taking the name "Pearl Jam". They had previously used the name "Mookie Blaylock".

== History ==
The band continued to play live shows after finishing the mixing sessions for its debut album Ten in England. After performing a handful of one-off shows on the West Coast (one of which was a concert that celebrated the completion of the film Singles on May 25), drummer Dave Krusen was dismissed from the band due to his alcoholism. He was briefly replaced by Matt Chamberlain. The tour properly kicked off on July 10, which focused on the East Coast. Chamberlain left the band following this tour and the filming of the "Alive" video on August 3, 1991, in Seattle, Washington at RKCNDY to join the Saturday Night Live band. For his replacement, Chamberlain suggested drummer Dave Abbruzzese, who joined the group and played the rest of Pearl Jam's live shows supporting the Ten album. Chamberlain said, "I toured in the van with them, played a bunch of clubs—I had a good time, definitely had a good time. They wanted me to join the band, but Edie Brickell & New Bohemians had just broke up, I had just got off the road after touring for four years straight—I could not imagine doing it again."

== Tour dates ==
Information taken from various sources.

Date	City	Venue	Opening acts	Supporting
Warm-up shows
May 15, 1991	Eugene	Woodmen of the World Union Trade Hall		Cherry Poppin' Daddies
May 17, 1991	Seattle	Off Ramp Café	Inspector Luv and the Ride Me Babys	
May 25, 1991	Seattle	RKCNDY (Singles wrap party)		
July 4, 1991	Seattle	RKCNDY		
North America United States Tour
July 10, 1991	Boston	Avalon		The Lemonheads, Buffalo Tom, 7 League Boots, Venus Beads, Stress
July 12, 1991	Philadelphia	JC Dobbs	Carnival of Souls, Mellow Vibe	
July 13, 1991	New York City	The Marquee Room		The Reverend Horton Heat, The Afghan Whigs, Gorilla, Beasts of Bourbon, Codeine
July 17, 1991	New York City	Wetlands Preserve		
July 21, 1991	Chicago	Cabaret Metro		Naked Raygun, Urge Overkill, Ned's Atomic Dustbin, The Jayhawks, Soul Asylum

== Band members ==
- Jeff Ament – bass
- Stone Gossard – rhythm guitar
- Mike McCready – lead guitar
- Eddie Vedder – lead vocals
- Dave Krusen – drums (May 15 to May 21)
- Matt Chamberlain – drums (July 4 to July 21)

== Songs performed ==
Originals

- "Alive"
- "Alone"
- "Black"
- "Breath"
- "Deep"
- "Even Flow"
- "Garden"
- "Jeremy"
- "Oceans"
- "Once"
- "Porch"
- "State of Love and Trust"
- "Wash"
- "Why Go"
