= Mookie Blaylock 1991 United States Tour =

1991 concert tour by Pearl Jam

- Tour by Pearl Jam
- Location: United States
- Associated album: Ten
- Start date: February 7, 1991
- End date: February 25, 1991
- No. of shows: 12

Pearl Jam concert chronology
- Mookie Blaylock 1991 United States Tour (1991); 1991 United States Tour (1991)

The Mookie Blaylock 1991 United States Tour was a concert tour by the American rock band Pearl Jam when the band was still known as Mookie Blaylock. It was the band's first tour after having played its first few shows in late 1990.

== History ==
The short tour of the United States focused on the West Coast. The majority of the shows found Pearl Jam serving as the opening act for Alice in Chains on the band's Facelift tour. Bassist Jeff Ament said, "We were then in the mode of 'Well, we’ve got to write a bunch of songs.' It wasn’t long after that we got a tour with Alice in Chains. It was kind of how we wanted it to be, we didn’t want to fuck around. I think Stone and I both knew the potential that he and I had together—but we needed to get out and play, and get better." Following the tour, the band soon signed to Epic Records. However, concerns about trademark issues with the name "Mookie Blaylock" necessitated a name change; the band's name became "Pearl Jam". This was Pearl Jam's only full tour with original drummer Dave Krusen. Krusen left the band in May 1991 following the completion of the recording sessions for the band's debut album, Ten. Footage from the February 10, 1991 concert at The Bacchanal in San Diego, California can be found on Alice in Chains' Music Bank: The Videos DVD.

== Tour dates ==
Information taken from various sources.

Date	City	Venue	Supporting
Warm-up show
February 1, 1991	Seattle	Off Ramp Café	Alice in Chains
United States Tour
February 7, 1991	Los Angeles	Florentine Gardens	Alice in Chains
February 8, 1991	Long Beach	God Save the Queen	Green Jellÿ
February 10, 1991	San Diego	The Bacchanal	Alice in Chains
February 11, 1991	Los Angeles	Club With No Name	Alice in Chains
February 12, 1991	Los Angeles	The Cathouse	Alice in Chains
February 13, 1991	San Diego	Winter's	BURNING HANDS
February 14, 1991	Oakland	Real Rock Club	
February 15, 1991	San Francisco	I-Beam	Alice in Chains
February 16, 1991	Sacramento	Cattle Club	Alice in Chains
February 17, 1991	Eugene	Union Trade Hall	Alice in Chains
February 20, 1991	Portland	Melody Ballroom	Alice in Chains
February 22, 1991	Seattle	Off Ramp Café	Alice in Chains

== Band members ==
- Jeff Ament – bass guitar
- Stone Gossard – rhythm guitar
- Mike McCready – lead guitar
- Eddie Vedder – lead vocals
- Dave Krusen – drums

== Songs performed ==
Originals

- "Alive"
- "Alone"
- "Breath"
- "Brother"
- "Deep"
- "Even Flow"
- "Garden"
- "Once"
- "Porch"
- "Release"
- "Wash"
- "Why Go"
