= Ten Tour =

1991–92 concert tour by Pearl Jam

- Tour by Pearl Jam
- Location: North America; Europe
- Associated album: Ten
- Start date: September 25, 1991
- End date: June 26, 1992
- Legs: 4
- No. of shows: 107 in North America; 41 in Europe; 148 in total

Pearl Jam concert chronology
- 1991 United States Tour (1991); Ten Tour (1991–92); Lollapalooza 1992 (1992)

The Ten Tour was a concert tour by the American rock band Pearl Jam to support its debut album, Ten. It was the band's first full-scale tour after a short tour of the United States in 1991.

== History ==
Bassist Jeff Ament stated that "essentially Ten was just an excuse to tour". He added, "We told the record company, 'We know we can be a great band, so let's just get the opportunity to get out and play.'" Pearl Jam faced a relentless touring schedule for Ten. Drummer Dave Abbruzzese joined the band for Pearl Jam's live shows supporting the album. Halfway through its own planned North American tour, Pearl Jam cancelled the remaining dates in order to take a slot opening for the Red Hot Chili Peppers on the band's Blood Sugar Sex Magik tour in the fall of 1991 in North America. Former Red Hot Chili Peppers drummer Jack Irons had called the Red Hot Chili Peppers and asked the band to allow his friend Eddie Vedder's new group to open for the band on its forthcoming tour. The Smashing Pumpkins also accompanied the Red Hot Chili Peppers on the tour. With the Red Hot Chili Peppers playing shows at arenas rather than theaters, the promoters of the tour decided that Pearl Jam should be replaced with a more successful act. Nirvana was chosen to replace Pearl Jam on the tour, however, The Smashing Pumpkins left the concert bill and were replaced by Pearl Jam. Epic executive Michael Goldstone observed that "the band did such an amazing job opening the Chili Peppers tour that it opened doors at radio." The band filmed its video for "Even Flow" at its January 17, 1992 show at the Moore Theatre in Seattle.

In 1992, the band embarked on its first ever European tour. On March 13, 1992, at the Munich, Germany show at Nachtwerk, Pearl Jam played Ten in its entirety in order mid-way through its set. The band then came back and did another tour of North America. Goldstone noted that the band's audience expanded, saying that unlike before "everyone came." The band's manager, Kelly Curtis, stated, "Once people came and saw them live, this lightbulb would go on. Doing their first tour, you kind of knew it was happening and there was no stopping it. To play in the Midwest and be selling out these 500 seat clubs. Eddie could say he wanted to talk to Brett, the sound guy, and they'd carry him out there on their hands. You hadn't really seen that reaction from a crowd before..." When Pearl Jam came back for a second go-around in Europe the band appeared at the well-known Pinkpop Festival in the Netherlands on June 8, 1992. This concert became legendary when Vedder jumped from a TV-camera-mast right into the crowd. The band cancelled its remaining European dates after an appearance at the Roskilde Festival on June 26, 1992 due to a confrontation with security at that event as well as exhaustion. Regarding the situation, Ament said, "We'd been on the road over 10 months. I think there just came a point about half way through that tour it was just starting to get pretty intense. I mean just being away from home, being on the road all the time and being lonely or being depressed or whatever." After this tour, the band would go on to play the 1992 Lollapalooza tour with the Red Hot Chili Peppers, Soundgarden, and Ministry, among others.

During this time period, Pearl Jam became known for its intense live performances. Vedder participated in stage diving as well as crowd surfing. Looking back at this time, Vedder said:

It's hard for us to watch early performances, even though that's when people think we were on fire and young. Playing music for as long as I had been playing music and then getting a shot at making a record and at having an audience and stuff, it's just like an untamed force...a different kind of energy. And I find it kind of hard to watch those early performances because it's so just fucking, semi-testosterone-fueled or whatever. But it didn't come from jock mentality. It came from just being let out of the gates. And Jeff and Stone, their horse was just about to be put down when it was put in the race. And I was coming from the same place. So when they finally let us out of the gates, we didn't have a smooth, galvanized, streamlined gate [sic]. We were just rocking all over the place.

== Tour dates ==
Information taken from various sources.

Date	City	Country	Venue	Opening act	Supporting
North America Leg 1
September 25, 1991	Victoria	Canada	Harpo's	The Colour out of Space	
September 26, 1991	Vancouver	Canada	Town Pump	Dead Surf Kiss	
September 28, 1991	Portland	United States	Satyricon	Beauty Stab	
September 30, 1991	San Francisco	United States	I-Beam	I Love You, Law and Order	
October 1, 1991	Los Angeles	United States	The Cathouse	I Love You	
October 2, 1991	Los Angeles	United States	The Troubadour	I Love You, Burning Hands	
October 5, 1991	San Diego	United States	Winter's	I Love You, Burning Hands	
October 6, 1991	Los Angeles	United States	Hollywood Palladium		
October 7, 1991	Phoenix	United States	Mason Jar	I Love You	
October 9, 1991	Austin	United States	Back Room	I Love You	
October 10, 1991	Dallas	United States	Trees	I Love You	
October 11, 1991	Houston	United States	The Vatican	I Love You	
October 13, 1991	Atlanta	United States	The Point	I Love You	
October 14, 1991	Carrboro	United States	Cat's Cradle	I Love You	
October 15, 1991	Washington, D.C.	United States	~~Nightclub 9:30~~ Cancelled		
October 16, 1991	Madison	United States	Oscar Mayer Theater		The Smashing Pumpkins, Red Hot Chili Peppers
October 17, 1991	DeKalb	United States	Duke Ellington Ballroom, Holmes Student Center, Northern Illinois University		The Smashing Pumpkins, Red Hot Chili Peppers
October 19, 1991	Ames	United States	C.Y. Stephens Auditorium, Iowa State University		The Smashing Pumpkins, Red Hot Chili Peppers
October 20, 1991	Omaha	United States	Peony Park Ballroom		The Smashing Pumpkins, Red Hot Chili Peppers
October 22, 1991	Milwaukee	United States	Eagle's Ballroom		The Smashing Pumpkins, Red Hot Chili Peppers
October 23, 1991	East Lansing	United States	MSU Auditorium, Michigan State University		The Smashing Pumpkins, Red Hot Chili Peppers
October 25, 1991	Pittsburgh	United States	Palumbo Center		The Smashing Pumpkins, Red Hot Chili Peppers
October 26, 1991	Cleveland	United States	Cleveland Music Hall		The Smashing Pumpkins, Red Hot Chili Peppers
October 27, 1991	Rochester	United States	Rochester Auditorium Theatre		The Smashing Pumpkins, Red Hot Chili Peppers
October 29, 1991	Toronto	Canada	Concert Hall		The Smashing Pumpkins
October 30, 1991	Toronto	Canada	Concert Hall		The Smashing Pumpkins, Red Hot Chili Peppers
November 1, 1991	Boston	United States	Walter Brown Arena, Boston University		The Smashing Pumpkins, Red Hot Chili Peppers
November 2, 1991	Burlington	United States	Burlington Memorial Auditorium, University of Vermont		The Smashing Pumpkins, Red Hot Chili Peppers
November 3, 1991	Springfield	United States	Springfield Civic Center		The Smashing Pumpkins, Red Hot Chili Peppers
November 4, 1991	Amherst	United States	Student Union Ballroom, University of Massachusetts Amherst	Eleven	
November 5, 1991	Troy	United States	Houston Field House		The Smashing Pumpkins, Red Hot Chili Peppers
November 6, 1991	Ithaca	United States	The Haunt (rescheduled from 4 Nov.)	Carnival Art	
November 7, 1991	Syracuse	United States	Landmark Theatre		The Smashing Pumpkins, Red Hot Chili Peppers
November 8, 1991	New York City	United States	CBGB		
November 9, 1991	Washington, D.C.	United States	Bender Arena, American University		The Smashing Pumpkins, Red Hot Chili Peppers
November 11, 1991	New York City	United States	Roseland Ballroom		The Smashing Pumpkins, Red Hot Chili Peppers
November 12, 1991	New York City	United States	Roseland Ballroom		The Smashing Pumpkins, Red Hot Chili Peppers
November 13, 1991	Warwick	United States	Rocky Point Palladium		The Smashing Pumpkins
November 15, 1991	New York City	United States	Roseland Ballroom		The Smashing Pumpkins, Red Hot Chili Peppers
November 16, 1991	New York City	United States	Roseland Ballroom		The Smashing Pumpkins, Red Hot Chili Peppers
November 17, 1991	State College	United States	Rec Hall, Pennsylvania State University		The Smashing Pumpkins, Red Hot Chili Peppers
November 18, 1991	Columbus	United States	Veterans Memorial Auditorium	Eleven	The Smashing Pumpkins
November 20, 1991	Kalamazoo	United States	The State Downtown Theater		The Smashing Pumpkins
November 21, 1991	Ann Arbor	United States	Blind Pig	Zoo Gods	
November 22, 1991	Detroit	United States	State Theatre (Clubland)		The Smashing Pumpkins, Red Hot Chili Peppers
November 23, 1991	Detroit	United States	State Theatre (Clubland)		The Smashing Pumpkins, Red Hot Chili Peppers
November 24, 1991	Indianapolis	United States	Indiana Convention Center		The Smashing Pumpkins, Red Hot Chili Peppers
November 26, 1991	Normal	United States	Braden Auditorium, Illinois State University		The Smashing Pumpkins, Red Hot Chili Peppers
November 27, 1991	Cincinnati	United States	Cincinnati Gardens		The Smashing Pumpkins, Red Hot Chili Peppers
November 29, 1991	Chicago	United States	Aragon Ballroom		The Smashing Pumpkins, Red Hot Chili Peppers
November 30, 1991	Saint Paul	United States	Roy Wilkins Auditorium		The Smashing Pumpkins, Red Hot Chili Peppers
December 2, 1991	St. Louis	United States	The American Theater		The Smashing Pumpkins, Red Hot Chili Peppers
December 3, 1991	St. Louis	United States	The American Theater		The Smashing Pumpkins, Red Hot Chili Peppers
December 4, 1991	Kansas City	United States	Memorial Hall		The Smashing Pumpkins, Red Hot Chili Peppers
December 6, 1991	New Orleans	United States	Municipal Auditorium		The Smashing Pumpkins, Red Hot Chili Peppers
December 7, 1991	Houston	United States	Unicorn Ballroom		The Smashing Pumpkins, Red Hot Chili Peppers
December 8, 1991	Houston	United States	The Vatican		The Smashing Pumpkins, Red Hot Chili Peppers
December 10, 1991	Austin	United States	City Coliseum		The Smashing Pumpkins, Red Hot Chili Peppers
December 11, 1991	Dallas	United States	Bronco Bowl		The Smashing Pumpkins, Red Hot Chili Peppers
December 11, 1991	Dallas	United States	Trees		
December 12, 1991	Norman	United States	Hollywood Theater		The Smashing Pumpkins
December 14, 1991	Denver	United States	Denver Coliseum		The Smashing Pumpkins, Red Hot Chili Peppers
December 15, 1991	Salt Lake City	United States	Club DV8		The Smashing Pumpkins
December 27, 1991	Los Angeles	United States	Los Angeles Memorial Sports Arena		Nirvana, Red Hot Chili Peppers
December 28, 1991	San Diego	United States	Del Mar Pavilion		Nirvana, Red Hot Chili Peppers
December 29, 1991	Tempe	United States	Arizona State University Center		Nirvana, Red Hot Chili Peppers
December 31, 1991	Daly City	United States	Cow Palace		Nirvana, Red Hot Chili Peppers
January 2, 1992	Salem	United States	Salem Armory		Nirvana, Red Hot Chili Peppers
January 3, 1992	Seattle	United States	RKCNDY		
January 17, 1992	Seattle	United States	Moore Theatre	Gruntruck	
January 24, 1992	Los Angeles	United States	Rock for Choice		
Europe Leg 1
February 3, 1992	Southend-on-Sea	England	The Esplanade Club	Chickenhawk	
February 4, 1992	London	England	Borderline		
February 7, 1992	Stockholm	Sweden	Koolkat Klub		
February 8, 1992	Oslo	Norway	Alaska	The Swamp Babies	
February 9, 1992	Copenhagen	Denmark	Pumpe Huset		
February 11, 1992	Paris	France	Locomotive		
February 12, 1992	Amsterdam	Netherlands	Melkweg	The Covenant (NL)	
February 15, 1992	Madrid	Spain	Revolver	The Smashing Pumpkins	
February 18, 1992	Milan	Italy	Sorpasso	The Smashing Pumpkins	
February 19, 1992	Winterthur	Switzerland	Albani Bar of Music	The Smashing Pumpkins	
February 21, 1992	Manchester	England	International II	Claytown Troupe	
February 22, 1992	Newcastle upon Tyne	England	Riverside	Claytown Troupe	
February 23, 1992	Glasgow	Scotland	Glasgow Cathouse	Claytown Troupe	
February 25, 1992	Nottingham	England	Rock City	Claytown Troupe	
February 26, 1992	Birmingham	England	Edward's No. 8	Claytown Troupe	
February 27, 1992	Bradford	England	Queenshall	Claytown Troupe	
February 28, 1992	London	England	University of London Union	Claytown Troupe	
March 1, 1992	Groningen	Netherlands	Vera	Captain Nemo	
March 2, 1992	The Hague	Netherlands	Paard		
March 3, 1992	Nijmegen	Netherlands	~~Concertgebouw de Vereeniging~~ Cancelled		
March 4, 1992	Utrecht	Netherlands	Tivoli	City Pig Unit	
March 5, 1992	Eindhoven	Netherlands	Effenaar	The Covenant (NL)	
March 6, 1992	Rotterdam	Netherlands	Nighttown	Prodigal Sons	
March 8, 1992	Cologne	Germany	Live Music Hall	Sun	
March 9, 1992	Berlin	Germany	The Loft	Sun	
March 10, 1992	Hamburg	Germany	Markthalle	Sun	
March 12, 1992	Frankfurt	Germany	Batschkaap	Sun	
March 13, 1992	Munich	Germany	Nachtwerk	Sun	
North America Leg 2
March 25, 1992	Minneapolis	United States	First Avenue Club	Eleven	
March 26, 1992	Madison	United States	R & R Station	Eleven	
March 27, 1992	Milwaukee	United States	Marquette University Alumni Hall	The Smashing Pumpkins	
March 28, 1992	Chicago	United States	Cabaret Metro	The Smashing Pumpkins	
March 30, 1992	Cincinnati	United States	Bogart's	Eleven	
March 31, 1992	Columbus	United States	Newport Music Hall	Eleven	
April 2, 1992	Cleveland	United States	Peabody's Down Under	Eleven	
April 3, 1992	Detroit	United States	St. Andrew's Hall	Eleven	
April 4, 1992	Toronto	Canada	Concert Hall	Eleven	
April 6, 1992	Lowell	United States	Cumnock Hall	Eleven	
April 7, 1992	Amherst	United States	Student Union Ballroom, University of Massachusetts Amherst	Eleven	
April 8, 1992	Boston	United States	Axis Club	Eleven	
April 10, 1992	Philadelphia	United States	Trocadero Club	Eleven, Pond	
April 12, 1992	New York City	United States	The Limelight		
April 13, 1992	College Park	United States	Ritchie Coliseum, University of Maryland, College Park	Follow for Now	
April 15, 1992	Charlotte	United States	~~1313~~ Cancelled		
April 16, 1992	Athens	United States	Legion Field, University of Georgia	Follow for Now	
April 17, 1992	Atlanta	United States	~~The Masquerade~~ Cancelled		
April 19, 1992	Dallas	United States	Starplex Amphitheater		
April 20, 1992	New Orleans	United States	Tipitina's	Follow for Now	
April 22, 1992	St. Petersburg	United States	Janus Landing	Follow for Now	
April 23, 1992	Miami	United States	Cameo Theater	Follow for Now	
April 24, 1992	Orlando	United States	The Edge	Follow for Now, Slow	
April 25, 1992	Pensacola	United States	~~Night Owl~~ Cancelled		
April 28, 1992	Austin	United States	The Coliseum	Swervedriver, Monster Magnet	Soundgarden
April 29, 1992	Dallas	United States	Bronco Bowl		Soundgarden
April 30, 1992	Houston	United States	Unicorn Club		Soundgarden
May 2, 1992	Lawrence	United States	Day on the Hill, University of Kansas	Tribe After Tribe, Let's Go Bowling, Zoom, Trademark	
May 3, 1992	Omaha	United States	The Ranch Bowl	Tribe After Tribe	
May 5, 1992	Boulder	United States	Glenn Miller Ballroom, University of Colorado Boulder	Tribe After Tribe	
May 7, 1992	Bozeman	United States	Gallitan Fairgrounds	Tribe After Tribe	
May 9, 1992	Mesa	United States	Mesa Amphitheatre	Tribe After Tribe	
May 10, 1992	Tijuana	Mexico	Iguana's	Tribe After Tribe	
May 12, 1992	Ventura	United States	Ventura Theater	Tribe After Tribe	
May 13, 1992	Los Angeles	United States	Hollywood Palladium	Tribe After Tribe, Rage Against the Machine	
May 15, 1992	San Francisco	United States	Warfield Theatre	Tribe After Tribe, Rage Against the Machine	
May 16, 1992	Santa Cruz	United States	The Catalyst		
May 17, 1992	Portland	United States	Roseland Theater	Tribe After Tribe	
May 18, 1992	Vancouver	Canada	Plaza of Nations (rescheduled from the Town Pump, May 21, 1992)	Tribe After Tribe, Mystery Machine	
May 19, 1992	Portland	United States	Melody Lane		
May 20, 1992	Seattle	United States	~~Gas Works Park~~ Cancelled		
Europe Leg 2
June 5, 1992	Nürburg	Germany	Rock am Ring		
June 6, 1992	London	England	Finsbury Park Festival	Redd Kross, L7, Therapy?	The Cult
June 8, 1992	Landgraaf	Netherlands	Pinkpop Festival		
June 10, 1992	Stuttgart	Germany	Kongresszentrum	Eleven	
June 11, 1992	Hamburg	Germany	Große Freiheit 36	Eleven	
June 13, 1992	Berlin	Germany	Wuhlheide	Bad Religion	
June 14, 1992	Bremen	Germany	Kloecknergelaende im Industriehafen		
June 15, 1992	Nuremberg	Germany	Serenadenhof	Eleven	
June 17, 1992	Milan	Italy	City Square Club	Eleven	
June 18, 1992	Zürich	Switzerland	Volkshaus	Eleven	
June 19, 1992	Vienna	Austria	Rockhaus	Eleven	
June 22, 1992	Paris	France	Élysée Montmartre	Eleven	
June 25, 1992	Stockholm	Sweden	Moderna Museet, Skeppsholmen; Previously scheduled for the Melody Club.		
June 26, 1992	Roskilde	Denmark	Roskilde Festival		
June 27, 1992	Turku	Finland	~~Ruisrock~~ Cancelled		
June 28, 1992	Oslo	Norway	~~Kalvøyafestivalen~~ Cancelled		
June 30, 1992	London	England	~~Brixton Academy~~ Cancelled		
July 1, 1992	London	England	~~London Astoria~~ Cancelled		
July 2, 1992	Belfort	France	~~Eurockenes Festival~~ Cancelled		
July 4, 1992	Torhout	Belgium	~~Torhout Festival~~ Cancelled		
July 5, 1992	Werchter	Belgium	~~Werchter Festival~~ Cancelled		

== Band members ==
- Jeff Ament – bass guitar
- Stone Gossard – rhythm guitar
- Mike McCready – lead guitar
- Eddie Vedder – lead vocals
- Dave Abbruzzese – drums

== Songs performed ==
Originals

- "Alive"
- "Alone"
- "Angel"
- "Black"
- "Breath"
- "Deep"
- "Dirty Frank" (snippet)
- "Even Flow"
- "Footsteps"
- "Garden"
- "Jeremy"
- "Leash"
- "Oceans"
- "Once"
- "Porch"
- "Release"
- "State of Love and Trust"
- "Wash"
- "Why Go"
- "Yellow Ledbetter" (snippet)

Covers

- "Baba O'Riley" (The Who)
- "Brass in Pocket" (The Pretenders) (snippet)
- "Crazy" (Seal) (snippet)
- "Dolly Dagger" (Jimi Hendrix) (snippet)
- "Driven to Tears" (The Police)
- "Happy Birthday" (traditional)
- "Help Me, Rhonda" (The Beach Boys) (snippet)
- "Hunger Strike" (Temple of the Dog) (snippet)
- "I Can't Explain" (The Who) (snippet)
- "I've Got a Feeling" (The Beatles) live jam with Claytown Troupe
- "My Generation" (The Who)
- "Outshined" (Soundgarden) (snippet)
- "Owner of a Lonely Heart" (Yes) (snippet)
- "Pulled Up" (Talking Heads) (snippet)
- "Rain" (The Beatles) (snippet)
- "Redemption Song" (Bob Marley & The Wailers)
- "Rockin' in the Free World" (Neil Young)
- "School's Out" (Alice Cooper) (snippet)
- "Shower the People" (James Taylor) (snippet)
- "Smells Like Teen Spirit" (Nirvana) (snippet)
- "Suggestion" (Fugazi)
- "Sympathy for the Devil" (The Rolling Stones) (snippet)
- "Three Little Birds" (Bob Marley & The Wailers) (snippet)
- "Throw Your Arms Around Me" (Hunters & Collectors)
- "When the Saints Go Marching In" (anonymous) (snippet)
- "Where Do the Children Play?" (Cat Stevens) (snippet)
- "Window Paine" (The Smashing Pumpkins)
