= Wrigley Field =

Baseball stadium in Chicago, Illinois, US

- The Friendly Confines

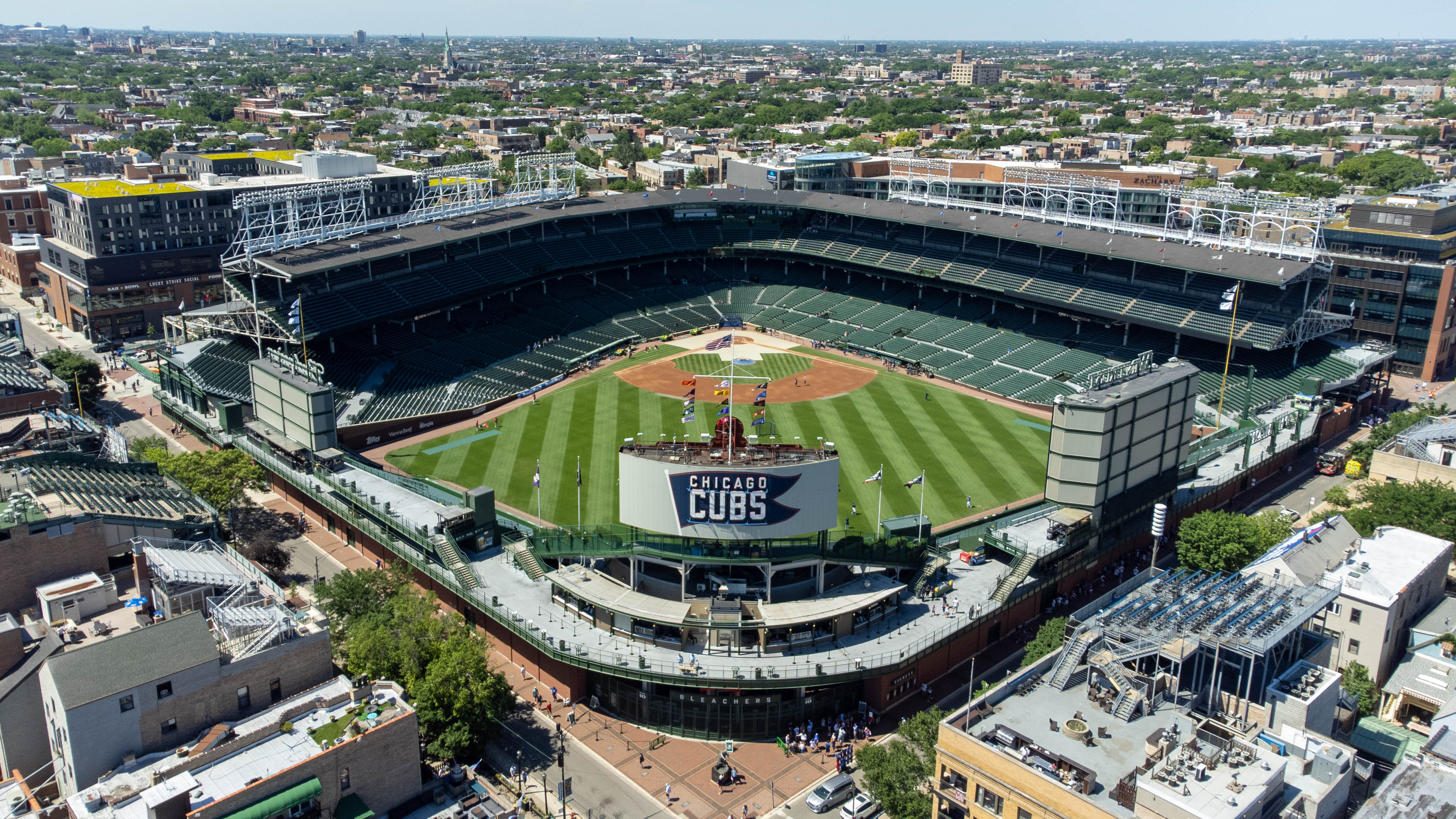
- Wrigley Field in 2022

- Location in Chicago Location in Illinois Location in the United States
- Former names: Weeghman Park (1914–1920); Cubs Park (1920–1926)
- Address: 1060 West Addison Street
- Location: Chicago, Illinois, U.S.
- Coordinates: 41°56′53″N 87°39′20″W
- Owner: Ricketts family
- Operator: Chicago Cubs
- Capacity: 41,649
- Surface: Merion bluegrass
- Record attendance: 47,171 (August 31, 1948 vs. Brooklyn Dodgers)
- Field size: Left field – 355 ft (108.2 m); Left-center – 368 ft (112.2 m); Center field – 400 ft (121.9 m); Right-center – 368 ft (112.2 m); Right field – 353 ft (107.6 m); Backstop – 55 ft (16.8 m); Outfield wall height: Bleachers – 11 ft 6 in (3.5 m); Corners – 15 ft (4.6 m)
- Public transit: Red at Addison

Construction
- Groundbreaking: March 4, 1911; 115 years ago
- Opened: April 23, 1914; 112 years ago
- Renovated: 1937, 1988, 2014–2019
- Expanded: 1922, 1927, 2006
- Cost: US$250,000 (US$8.04 million in 2025 dollars)
- Architect: Zachary Taylor Davis
- General contractor: Blome-Sinek Company

Tenants
- Chicago Whales (FL) (1914–1915); Chicago Cubs (MLB) (1916–present); Chicago Tigers (APFA) (1920); Hammond Pros (NFL) (1920–1926); Chicago Bears (NFL) (1921–1970); Chicago Cardinals (NFL) (1931–1939); Chicago Sting (NASL) (1977–1982, 1984)

Website
- mlb.com/cubs/ballpark

Chicago Landmark
- Designated: February 1, 2004

U.S. National Historic Landmark
- Designated: September 23, 2020 (Note: Eligibility was granted in 1987)

U.S. National Register of Historic Places
- Designated: September 23, 2020
- Reference no.: 100005739

Wrigley Field (/ˈrɪɡ.li/) is a ballpark on the North Side of Chicago, Illinois, United States. It is the home ballpark of Major League Baseball's Chicago Cubs, one of the city's two MLB franchises. It first opened in 1914 as Weeghman Park for Charles Weeghman's Chicago Whales of the Federal League, which folded after the 1915 baseball season. The Cubs played their first home game at the park on April 20, 1916, defeating the Cincinnati Reds 7–6 in 11 innings. Chewing gum magnate William Wrigley Jr. of the Wrigley Company acquired the Cubs in 1921. It was named Cubs Park from 1920 to 1926, before changing its name to Wrigley Field in 1927. The stadium currently seats 41,649 people.

In the North Side community area of Lakeview in the Wrigleyville neighborhood, Wrigley Field is on an irregular block bounded by Clark and Addison streets to the west and south, and Waveland and Sheffield avenues to the north and east. Wrigley Field is nicknamed "The Friendly Confines", a phrase popularized by Hall of Fame shortstop and first baseman Ernie Banks. The oldest park in the National League, it is the second-oldest in the majors after Fenway Park (1912), and the only remaining Federal League park. The park was designated a National Historic Landmark in 2020.

Wrigley Field is well known for its ivy-covered brick outfield wall, distinctive wind patterns off Lake Michigan, the red marquee over the main entrance, and the hand-turned scoreboard. The stadium is situated in a primarily residential neighborhood without parking lots, and spectators have views from the rooftops behind the outfield. Additionally, it was the last Major League Baseball (MLB) park to have lights installed for night games, in 1988. From 1921 to 1970, the stadium was also home to the Chicago Bears of the National Football League, and from 1931 to 1939, it was the home of the Chicago Cardinals (now the Arizona Cardinals) of the National Football League. The elevation of its playing field is 600 feet (180 m) above sea level.

== History ==
Baseball executive Charles Weeghman hired his architect Zachary Taylor Davis to design the park, which was ready for baseball by the home opener on April 23, 1914. The original tenants, the Chicago Whales (also called the Chi-Feds), came in second in the Federal League rankings in 1914, and won the league championship in 1915.

Later in 1915, Weeghman's Federal League folded. The resourceful Weeghman formed a syndicate including chewing gum manufacturer William Wrigley Jr. to buy the Chicago Cubs from Charles P. Taft for about $500,000. Weeghman immediately moved the Cubs from the dilapidated West Side Grounds to his two-year-old park.

In 1918, Wrigley acquired the controlling interest in the club. In November 1926, he renamed the park Wrigley Field. In 1927, an upper deck was added, and in 1937, Bill Veeck, the son of the club president, planted ivy vines against the outfield walls after being inspired by the ivy planted at Perry Stadium, Indianapolis.

In June 2024, Wrigley Field announced a multiyear partnership with Invenergy, and their community solar company, Reactivate, to launch clean and renewable energy systems at the park. The agreement was to establish the stadium as an "anchor" for community solar projects in Wrigleyville, marking the ballpark's first ever use of renewable energy.

=== Renovation ===
The Ricketts family aggressively pursued a Wrigley Field renovation since buying the team and the stadium in 2009. During the annual Cubs Convention in January 2013, the family revealed the "1060 Project," which called for a $575-million, privately funded rehabilitation of the stadium to be completed over the course of five years. The planned proposal was vast and included, among other things, improvements to the stadium's façade, infrastructure, restrooms, concourses, suites, and press box, moving the bullpens and clubhouses, and the addition of restaurants, patio areas, batting tunnels, a 5,700 square foot (530 m^{2}) jumbotron, and an adjacent hotel, plaza, and office-retail complex.

After months of negotiations between the team, local Alderman Tom Tunney, and then-Mayor Rahm Emanuel, the plan obtained the endorsements of both the city's Landmarks Commission and Plan Commission before receiving final approval by the Chicago City Council in July 2013. To help fund the project, the team planned to more than double the amount of advertising signage in and around the stadium to about 51,000 square feet (4,700 m^{2}), including additional signage to be placed beyond the outfield walls – a move that was opposed by many owners of the rooftop clubs surrounding the stadium, who worried that such signage would obstruct their sightlines. Before work on the project began, the team wanted the rooftop owners to agree not to pursue legal action challenging the construction and continued to negotiate privately with them – offering to reduce the size and number of signs to be built to gain their assent. The team could not come to terms with the rooftop owners, who had a lease agreement with the team until 2023 in exchange for paying 17% of the gross revenues. In May 2014, the Cubs announced they would pursue the original 2013 plan to modify the park. Over the course of the next three years, the Ricketts family began to purchase many of the rooftop locations.

==== "1060 Project" Renovation ====
Phase one of the "1060 Project" began on September 29, 2014. During the offseason, the bleachers in both outfields were expanded and the stadium's footprint was extended further onto both Waveland and Sheffield Avenues. A 3,990 sq ft (370 m^{2}) Jumbotron scoreboard was added to the left-field bleachers. A 2,400 sq ft (220 m^{2}) video scoreboard was also added in the right-field bleachers, and the parking lots along Clark Street were excavated for underground players' locker rooms and lounges.

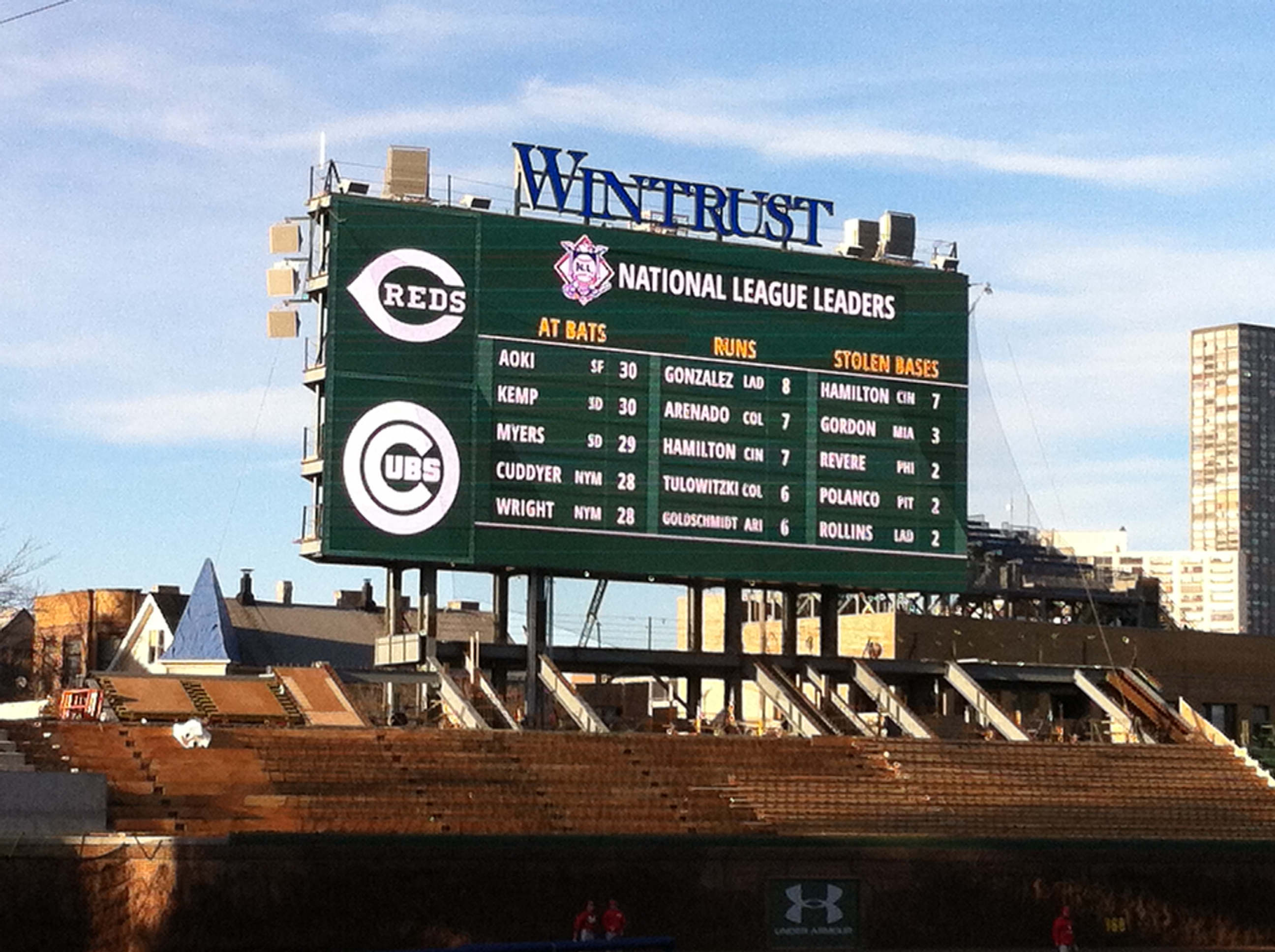
Videoboard above new left field bleacher seats in 2015

After the close of the extended 2015 season, work began on phase two of the project.

Exterior renovations of the park sought to restore design elements present before the 1960s. These details include ornamental muted-green grillwork and red Ludowici terra cotta roofing.

Phase three of the 1060 Project was completed before the start of the 2017 season. The left- and right-field bullpens were relocated to enclosed areas under the bleachers, the brick walls were extended toward the field, and new seating was added in the vacated bullpen areas. A visiting team "batting tunnel" was also added. Partial façade replacement and concourse restoration were completed along Addison Street, along with structural improvements to the right-field bleachers. The outfield turf was replaced just weeks before the start of the season. The Cubs Plaza building just to the west of Wrigley was finalized, and the "Park at Wrigley", the area above Cubs players' dressing rooms, was in use for fans before and during games. Construction of Hotel Zachary along the west side of Clark Street was ongoing.

The fourth phase of improvements began at the conclusion of the 2017 season. The dugouts were moved farther down the left- and right-field foul lines to make room for two of the four new luxury clubs. The seating area behind home plate was reconstructed to locate another of the new clubs. The final upper-level club was planned for the 2019 season. The Hotel Zachary, just across Clark Street, was open for business in time for the Cubs' first home game on April 9, 2018.

==== National Historic Landmark ====
Near the start of the renovations, the Ricketts applied for National Historic Landmark status for Wrigley Field in 2013. A similar plan had been successfully pursued by the owners of Fenway Park in Boston. To achieve landmark status, the renovations had to respect and reflect the historic character of the stadium. The benefit to the owners is that landmark status allows them to claim tax credits for the renovation. National landmark status was awarded in 2020, with the U.S. Secretary of the Interior commenting, "the historical significance of Wrigley Field is interwoven into our nation's story and a key part of what has become America's beloved pastime for over a century".

==== Firsts since renovation ====
On May 26, 2015, Cubs rookie third baseman Kris Bryant became the first to hit the new left field video screen with his 477-foot (145 m) home run. On October 13, the Cubs clinched a playoff series at home in Wrigley Field for the first time in franchise history, with a 6–4 victory in game four of the 2015 NLDS. After Anthony Rizzo hit what would be the game-winning and series-winning home run in the sixth inning, Kyle Schwarber's seventh-inning home run ball landed on top of the right-field scoreboard. The ball was left in place, encased in clear plexiglass to protect it from the elements, but was removed in 2016.

=== 100th anniversary ===
During the 2014 season, the Cubs celebrated the centennial of Wrigley Field. Each decade was represented during 10 homestands throughout the season. April 23, the 100th anniversary of the stadium's opening, had the Cubs playing the Arizona Diamondbacks in a throwback game. Each team represented one of the teams that played in the inaugural game at the stadium. The Cubs wore the uniforms of the Chicago Whales (Federals), the original occupants of the stadium, and the Diamondbacks wore uniforms representing the Kansas City Packers, whom the Federals played on April 23, 1914.

=== Lawsuit ===
On July 14, 2022, the United States government filed a lawsuit against the Chicago Cubs, operator of the stadium, for alleged violations of the Americans with Disabilities Act, claiming that the stadium did not accommodate spectators with disabilities, primarily those in wheelchairs. The lawsuit states that, during recent renovations, the stadium operator removed the best wheelchair seating, failed to add wheelchair accessibility to premium club rooms, and stuck the wheelchair seats behind railings, which could obstruct the view of those in wheelchairs. The Chicago Cubs, however, released a statement, saying, "Wrigley Field is now more accessible than it was in its 108-year history".

== Features ==
Wrigley Field follows the jewel-box ballpark design that was popular in the early part of the 20th century. The two recessed wall areas, or "wells", located both in left and right field, give those areas more length than if the wall were to follow the contour from center field. It is also in those wells, when cross-winds are blowing, that balls have a habit of bouncing in all directions. In addition, there is a long chain-link fence strip running the entire length of the outfield wall, the base of which is about two feet down from the top of the wall and the top of which projects out at an angle, primarily used to keep fans from interfering with balls in play and protecting the ivy, along with preventing falls. Called "the Basket" by players and fans alike, the rules of the field state that any ball landing within the basket is ruled a home run, making the distance to hit a home run in Wrigley Field actually shorter than the location of the outfield wall. The basket was installed by the team one month into the 1970 season in order to inhibit field rushes and injuries, where spectators in the bleachers would jump off the wall and onto the field after a win, a new tradition the Cubs wished to curb after several rush attempts during the previous season, and after the 1970 home opener.

=== Ivy-covered outfield walls ===
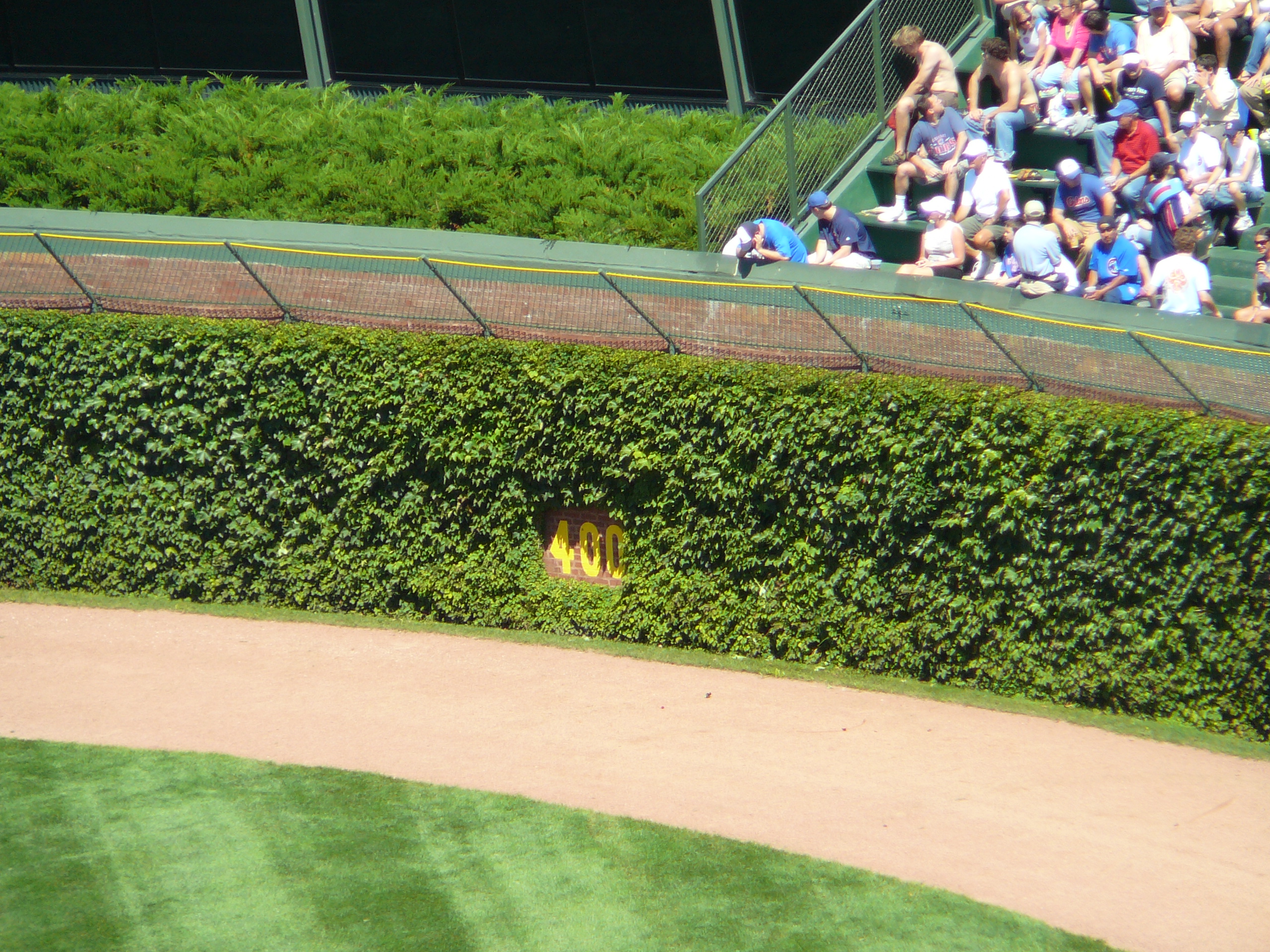
Wrigley's distinctive ivy-covered outfield walls in 2006

External videos
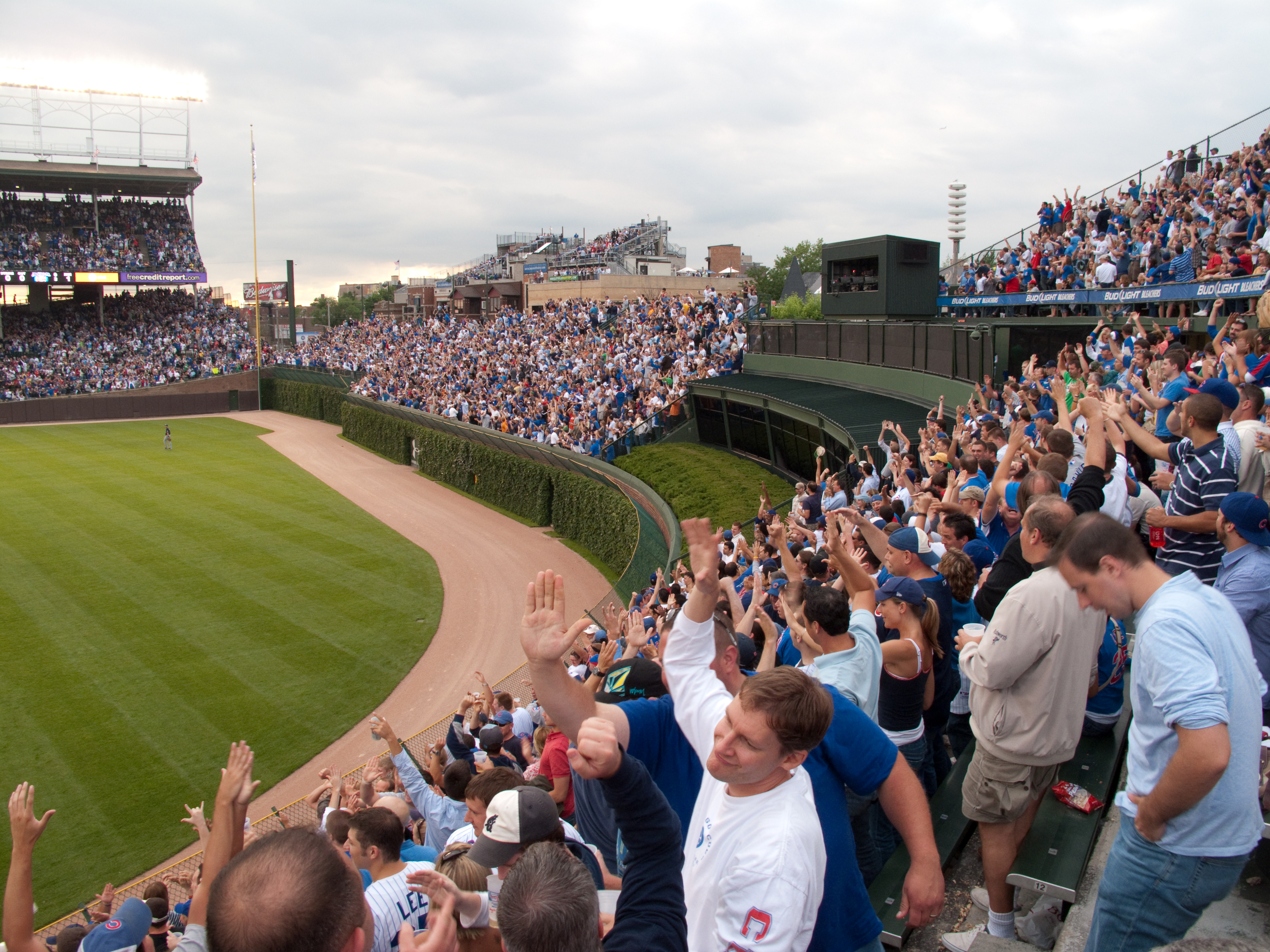
- Bleacher Bums (Part 1, 1984), WTTW - Channel 11, the play Bleacher Bums with Dennis Franz and Joe Mantegna

The ballpark's outfield walls are covered by ivy. In the first weeks of the baseball season, the ivy has not leafed out, and all that is visible are the vines. However, as the baseball season progresses further into spring, the ivy grows thick and green, disguising the hard brick surface of the outfield wall. In the autumn, generally during postseason, the ivy turns red.

In 1937, the stadium was renovated and P. K. Wrigley discussed beautification with then-Cubs President Bill Veeck, who suggested planting ivy on the outfield walls. The ivy was originally English ivy (Hedera helix), but was later changed to Parthenocissus tricuspidata, commonly called Boston ivy or Japanese ivy, which can endure the harsh Chicago winters better than the former species. Cuttings from the ivy were sold by local vendors. The Cubs attempted to grow the ivy on the outside of Wrigley Field as well, but the plantings were often stolen, so the Cubs abandoned the plans.

Following a later change in MLB rules, which requires all outfield walls to be padded, Wrigley Field was grandfathered into the rules, meaning it is the only stadium in the league without padded walls because of the ivy. In 2004, the ivy was specifically included in Wrigley Field's Landmark Designation by the Chicago City Council. (Note: Wrigley is now the only professional ballpark with an ivy-covered outfield wall. Several now-demolished ballparks featured ivy in the playing area, including Forbes Field, Wrigley Field's namesake in Los Angeles, and Bush Stadium (formerly Perry Stadium) in Indianapolis. Omaha's Rosenblatt Stadium, the former home of the College World Series as well as minor league baseball, had an ivy-covered brick wall that was replaced with a padded wall. Some ballparks feature ivy on out-of-play walls, especially as a covering for the batter's eye behind the center field fence.) Although the ivy appears to "pad" the bricks, it is of little practical use in this regard. There have been occasions of fielders being injured when slamming into the wall while pursuing a fly ball.

Under the ground rules of Wrigley Field, if a batted baseball gets stuck in the ivy the batter will be awarded a ground rule double by the umpire. Outfielders must raise their arms over their head, signaling to an umpire to rule on the play. However, if the ball becomes dislodged or the fielder reaches into the vines to retrieve it, it is considered in play and the baserunners may advance.

=== Dimensions ===
The distances from home plate to various points in the outfield have remained essentially unchanged since the bleachers were remodeled during the 1937 season. They were originally marked by wooden numbers cut from plywood, painted white, and placed in gaps where the ivy was not allowed to grow. Since the early 1980s, the numbers have been painted directly on the bricks, in yellow. Although the power-alley dimensions are relatively cozy, the foul lines are currently the deepest in the major leagues. It is 355 feet (108.2 m) to the notch in the wall just beyond the left field foul pole. The point where the bleacher wall begins to curve inward in left-center field, one of the two "wells", is an unmarked 357 feet (108.8 m). The front part of the left-center "well" is the closest point in the outfield, about 360 feet (109.7 m). The marked left-center field distance is 368 feet (112.2 m). It is closer to true center field than its right-center counterpart is. True center field is unmarked and is about 390 feet (118.9 m). The center field marker, which is to the right of true center field and in the middle of the quarter-circle defining the center field area, is 400 feet (121.9 m) and is the deepest point in the outfield. Right-center field is 368 feet (112.2 m), the notch of the right-center "well" is an unmarked 363 feet (110.6 m), and the right field foul line is 353 feet (107.6 m).

As of 2004, the backstop is listed in media sources as 55 feet (17 m) behind home plate. Although that distance is standard, the relatively small foul ground area in general gives an advantage to batters. The ivy-covered walls in the left and right field corners were reduced from 15 to 11 feet in height prior to the 2015 season as part of phase one of the 1060 project. Around the same time, advertising signs above the corners of the left and right field wall were installed, raising the bleachers by about three feet. It is a widespread misconception that the recently added signage are in-play and a part of the wall, neither of which are correct. The distance from where the front row bleachers are to the field, including the newly placed signs, is still 15 feet.

=== Rooftop seats ===
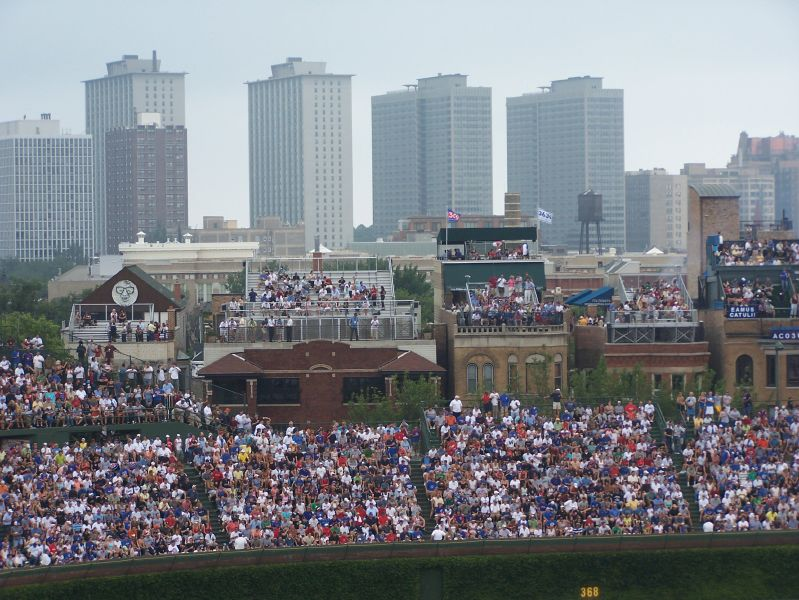
View of the right field bleacher seats before the 1060 Project renovations began

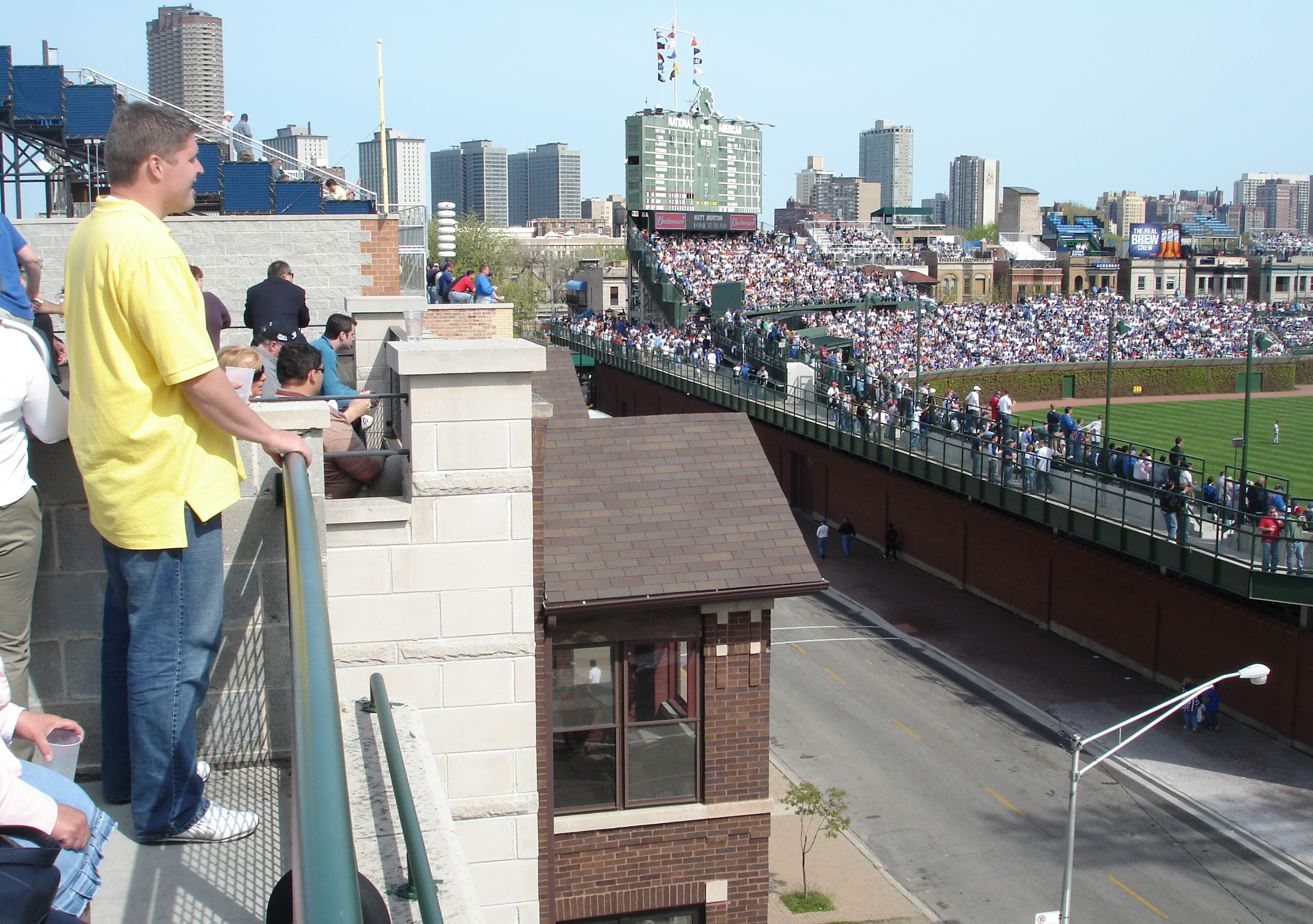
April 2006 view from a rooftop across Waveland Avenue

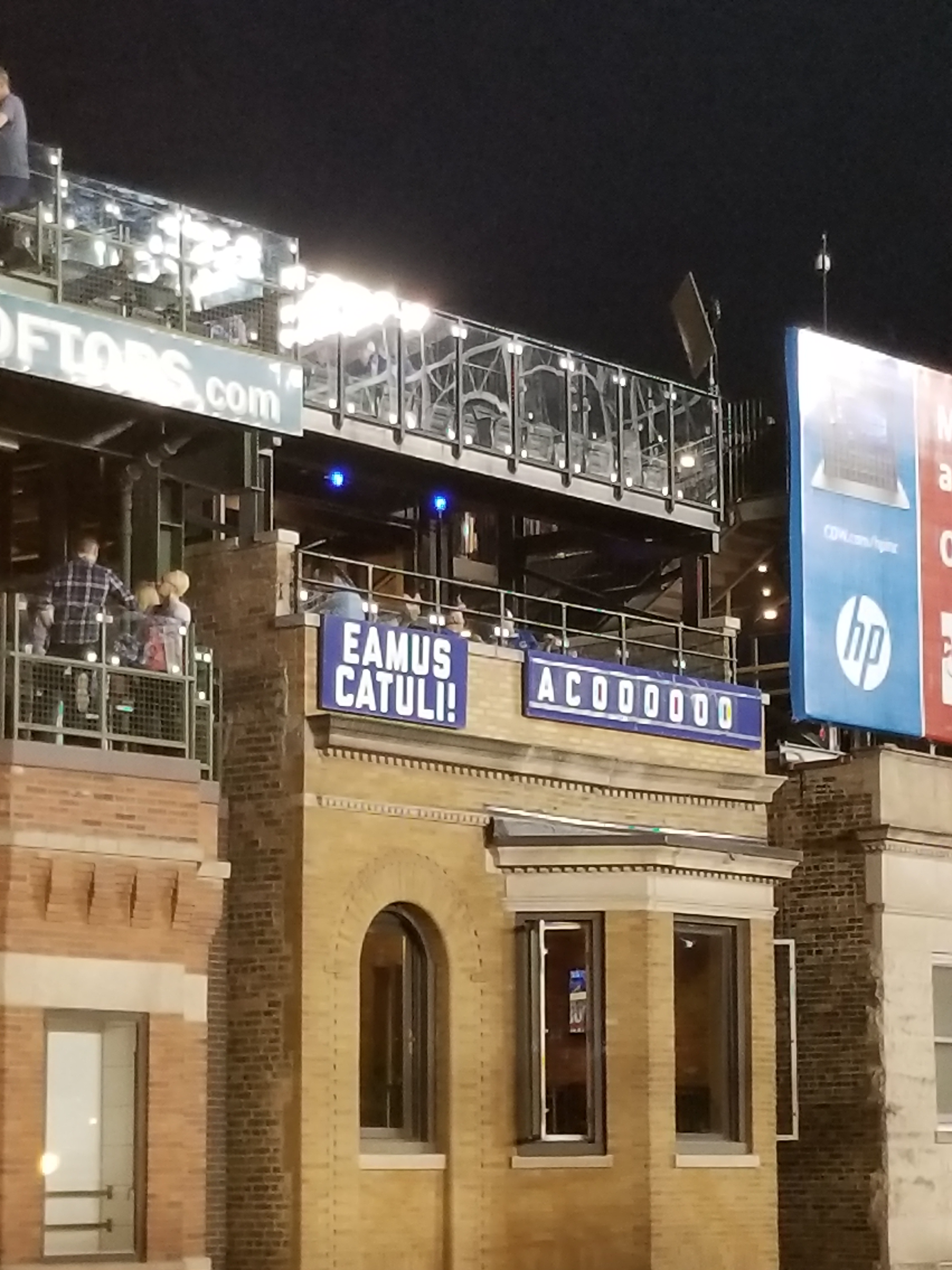
Eamus Catuli sign at "AC0000000" during the 2017 Chicago Cubs season, in recognition of the Cubs victory the previous season

When Wrigley Field was constructed, the buildings along Waveland and Sheffield avenues gave spectators a view of what was going on inside the ballpark, but did not become popular spectator areas until the 1929 World Series. The 1938 World Series brought paying spectators to the rooftops, however, fans typically sat in lawn chairs and brought their own food and beverages. In the mid-1980s, rooftop owners began to organize more formally as businesses, seeking to extract more revenue by updating the rooftops with bleacher-style grandstands. The Sky Box on Sheffield opened in 1993, originally catering primarily to corporate groups. Today, it is complete with a two-tier roof deck, indoor clubhouse, fully staffed bars on three levels, and an elevator.

In 1998, the city started requiring rooftop owners to have a license and began to regulate the venues. In 2003, relations between rooftop owners and the Cubs worsened when the team put up a large screen to block the view of the rooftops, exemplifying what is known as a spite fence. The Cubs then sued most rooftop businesses that year, claiming they were stealing from the team's product and "unjustly enriching themselves".

In 2004, the building owners agreed to share a portion of their proceeds with the Cubs. Rooftop owners were required to pay the team 17% of their gross revenue in an agreement lasting until 2023. The Cubs obtained permission from the city to expand the ballpark's own bleachers out over the sidewalks and do some additional construction on the open area of the property to the west, bordered by Clark and Waveland, and to close the remnant of Seminary Avenue that also existed on the property. The rooftop seats are now effectively part of the ballpark's seating area, although they are not included in the seating capacity figure.

In July 2016, former rooftop owner R. Marc Hamid was convicted on nine counts of mail fraud and illegal bank structuring. Hamid had been underreporting attendance at the Sky Box on Sheffield from 2008 to 2011, and covered up over $1 million in revenue while also avoiding hundreds of thousands of dollars in taxes and royalties that violated the agreement rooftop owners had with the Cubs. In January 2017, he was sentenced to 18 months in federal prison.

In 2013, the owners threatened suit when the team announced plans to renovate the stadium and potentially disrupt the sight lines. In May 2014, when the rooftop owners did not agree to a scaled down plan for renovations, the Cubs' owners announced their intentions to implement the original 2013 plan for renovations even if it meant battling the issue in court. Cubs owner Ricketts said Wrigley has "the worst player facilities in Major League Baseball...I am saying it is the time to invest in Wrigley Field and do the things that our competitors do." By the end of the 2016 season, the Ricketts family had acquired ten of the rooftop locations, with a financial stake in an eleventh.

Some of the rooftops became legendary in their own right. The Lakeview Baseball Club, which sits across Sheffield Avenue (right-field) from the stadium displayed a sign that read "Eamus Catuli!" (roughly Latin for "Let's Go Cubs!"—catuli translating to "whelps", the nearest Latin equivalent), flanked by a counter indicating the Cubs' long legacy of futility. The counter was labeled "AC" for "Anno Catulorum", or "In the Year of the Cubs". Prior to the team's 2016 championship, it read "AC0871108", with the first two digits indicating the number of years since the Cubs' last division championship as of the end of the previous season (2008), the next two digits indicating the number of years since the Cubs won the National League Pennant (1945), and the last three digits indicating the number of years since their last World Series win (1908). After winning the World Series in 2016, the sign was updated to "AC000000". As of 2025, the sign says "AC050909".

=== The Yard at Wrigley Field ===
In January 2025, the Cubs announced a new area called "The Yard at Wrigley Field", which features five semi-private rental areas designed to help fans sample the bleachers featuring an exclusive table with unlimited beer, seltzer, wine and non-alcoholic drinks, as well as a ballpark meal for each guest. The area would be accessible up to 90 minutes before the first pitch until the end of the game. The area has a capacity of 50 guests.

=== Seating capacity ===
| Years | Capacity |
|---|---|
| 1914 | 14,000 |
| 1915–1922 | 15,000 |
| 1923–1926 | 20,000 |
| 1927 | 38,396 |
| 1928–1937 | 40,000 |
| 1938 | 38,396 |
| 1939–1940 | 38,000 |
| 1941–1948 | 38,396 |
| 1949–1950 | 38,690 |
| 1951–1964 | 36,755 |
| 1965–1971 | 36,644 |
| 1972 | 37,702 |
| 1973–1981 | 37,741 |
| 1982–1985 | 37,272 |
| 1986 | 38,040 |
| 1987–1988 | 38,143 |
| 1989 | 39,600 |

| Years | Capacity |
|---|---|
| 1990–1993 | 38,711 |
| 1994–1997 | 38,765 |
| 1998–2000 | 38,884 |
| 2001 | 39,059 |
| 2002–2003 | 39,111 |
| 2004 | 39,345 |
| 2005 | 39,538 |
| 2006 | 41,118 |
| 2007–2008 | 41,160 |
| 2009–2010 | 41,210 |
| 2011 | 41,159 |
| 2012 | 41,009 |
| 2013 | 41,019 |
| 2014 | 41,072 |
| 2015 | 40,929 |
| 2016 | 41,268 |
| 2017–present | 41,649 |

==== Attendance records ====
- 41,688 – July 12, 2015 high mark after bleacher renovation
- 42,411 – Games 3 & 4 of the 2015 NLDS
- 42,445 – Game 3 of the 2017 NLDS

=== Unusual wind patterns ===
In April and May, the wind often comes off Lake Michigan (less than a mile to the east), with a northeast wind "blowing in" to knock down potential home runs and turn them into outs. In the summer, however, or on any warm, breezy day, the wind often comes from the south and the southwest, "blowing out" with the potential to turn normally harmless fly balls into home runs. A third variety is the cross-wind, which typically runs from the left field corner to the right field corner and causes all sorts of havoc. Depending on the direction of the wind, Wrigley can either be one of the friendliest parks in the major leagues for pitchers or among the worst. This makes Wrigley one of the most unpredictable parks in the Major Leagues. Many Cubs fans check their nearest flag before heading to the park on game days for an indication of what the game might be like. This is less of a factor for night games, however, because the wind does not blow as hard after the sun goes down.

With the wind blowing in, pitchers can dominate and no-hitters have resulted. The last two by a Cubs pitcher occurred near the beginning and the end of the 1972 season, by Burt Hooton and Milt Pappas respectively. Not until Cole Hamels of the Philadelphia Phillies no-hit the Cubs in 2015 would another no-hitter be pitched at Wrigley. In the seventh inning of Ken Holtzman's first no-hitter, on August 19, 1969, Hank Aaron of the Atlanta Braves hit a ball that looked headed for the bleachers, but the wind caught it just enough for left fielder Billy Williams to leap up and snare it.

With the wind blowing out, some true tape-measure home runs have been hit by well-muscled batters. Sammy Sosa and Dave "Kong" Kingman broke windows in the apartment buildings across Waveland Avenue several times, and Glenallen Hill put one on a rooftop. Batters have occasionally slugged it into, or to the side of, the first row or two of the "upper deck" of the center field bleachers. Sosa hit the roof of the center field camera booth on the fly during the 2003 NLCS against the Florida Marlins, some 450 feet (140 m) away. The longest blast was probably hit by Dave Kingman on a very windy day in 1976, while with the Mets. According to local legend, that day, Kingman launched a bomb that landed on the third porch roof on the east (center field) side of Kenmore Avenue some 550 feet away. No batter has ever hit the center field scoreboard, but it has been struck by a golf ball hit by Sam Snead using a two-iron.

=== Hand-turned scoreboard ===
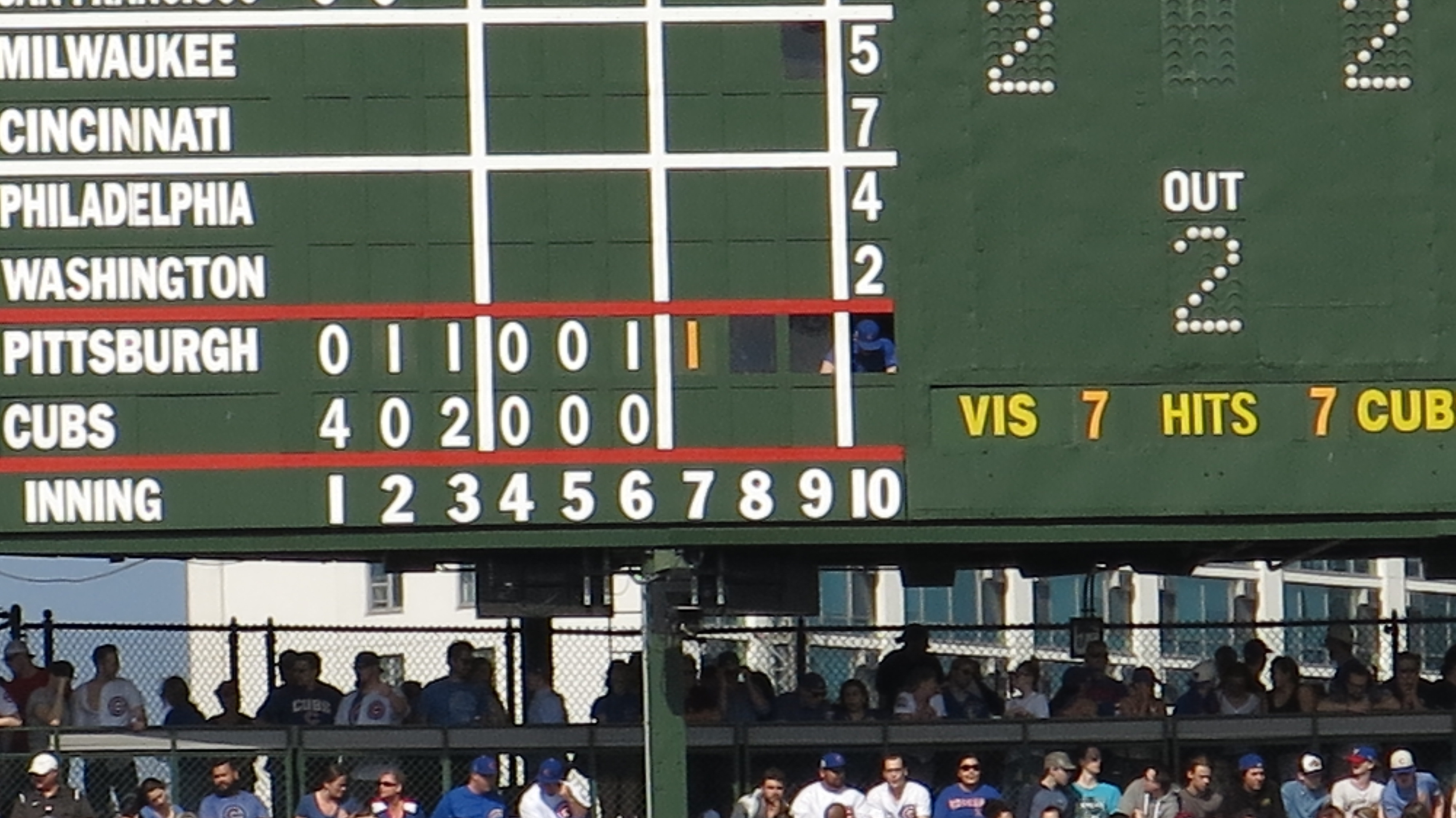
The scoreboard at Wrigley Field is operated by hand.

The scoreboard was installed in 1937, when Bill Veeck installed the new bleachers. It has remained in place ever since, and has only seen minor technical and cosmetic modifications. The clock was added in 1941, and a fifth row of scores was added to each side in 1961, with a sixth by 1969. A set of light stands facing onto the scoreboard was added in 1988 with the introduction of night games.

Along with Fenway Park's scoreboard and Daikin Park, Oakland-Alameda County Coliseum, Coors Field and Oracle Park's out of town scoreboards, Wrigley is one of the last parks to maintain a hand-turned scoreboard. A number turner watches the score changes on a computer and updates the scoreboard by manually replacing the numbers from within the scoreboard. The scoreboard is made of sheet steel. The numbers that are placed into the inning windows are also steel, painted forest green, and numbered with white numerals. The box for the game playing at Wrigley uses yellow numerals for the current inning. The clock, which sits at the top center of the scoreboard, has never lost time in its 85-year existence.

Standing over the clock are three flagpoles, one for each division in the National League. There are 15 flags, one for each National League team, and their order on the flagpoles reflects the current standings. The entrance to the scoreboard is a trap-door on the bottom. On the reverse of the scoreboard, visible from the CTA elevated trains, is a blue Cubs pennant in white outlined in red neon. The scoreboard was extensively rehabilitated for the 2010 season.

Unlike the home of the Red Sox, the scoreboard at Wrigley is mounted above the centerfield bleachers, rather than at ground level, making it harder to hit during play. No players have hit the current scoreboard, although at least three have come close: Roberto Clemente to the left side on May 17, 1959; and Bill Nicholson and Eddie Mathews to the right on August 22, 1942, (Note: Ever since 1989, a home run hit by Nicholson in 1948—later identified as the one hit on April 24 off the Cardinals' Al Brazle,—has been paired with Clemente's 1959 near miss. However, a study by Chicago historian Sam Pathy, documenting the longest home runs ever hit at Wrigley Field and drawing on a multitude of contemporaneous news stories, uncovered no evidence of this alleged proximity.) and April 22, 1953, respectively.

In 2010, the Cubs considered adding a video screen to the stadium, but the hand-turned scoreboard cannot be moved due to the park's landmark status, which also prohibits even simple facelifts, such as adding two more games on either side (there are 15 teams in both the National and American Leagues) of the 12-game, 24-team scoreboard (reflecting the MLB from 1969 to 1976), so up to three games (one NL, one AL and the interleague) each day cannot be posted. Those games may eventually be part of the auxiliary video board currently on the right field that may also be added in left field. Most Cubs players support the concept of a video board, and work on two additional scoreboards began at the end of the 2014 season.

On March 21, 2013, it was announced that Alderman Tom Tunney wanted to demolish the scoreboard to clear the view for nearby residents, who watch games from their rooftops. To date, there is a third generation scoreboard operator whose grandfather began working in the hand-turned scoreboard at its inception.

=== Main entry marquee ===
Directly over the main entrance to the stadium stands a large, red, art deco-style marquee, with "Wrigley Field, Home of Chicago Cubs" painted in white. The marquee was installed in 1934, and was originally painted green with changeable sections to announce upcoming games. By 1939, it was repainted dark blue and the original "Home of the Cubs", was replaced with "Home of Chicago Cubs". In years when the Bears played there, the sign was reworded accordingly during football season. On March 23, 1960, the Cubs repainted the sign red.

In 1982, the two-line announcement board was replaced with an electronic LED message board, and a backlit advertising panel was added below (which is now solid red). The marquee uses red neon lights at night, showing "Wrigley Field" in red, with the rest of the sign in darkness. A Budweiser logo was on the lower panel in the early 1980s, around the time when the team added the LED signage. The Chicago Transit Authority Addison street platform that serves Wrigley Field uses an image of the marquee painted on walls to announce the destination. In November 2010, the marquee was painted purple with an Allstate Insurance logo for the Northwestern Wildcats, who played as the home team against the Illinois Fighting Illini in a Big Ten football game.

In 2015, a Toyota logo was placed on the lower panel just below the LED sign on the marquee; previously, the area was used for logos of transient corporate sponsors and team initiatives. Toyota, one of the team's "legacy partners", began displaying other signage in and around the park in 2016, including branding on all of its parking lots.

The marquee was temporarily removed and restored for the 2016 season, including new paint, a new LED display board, and new neon lights. The back of the sign was given a new green paint job as well, which can now be seen from inside the terrace level.

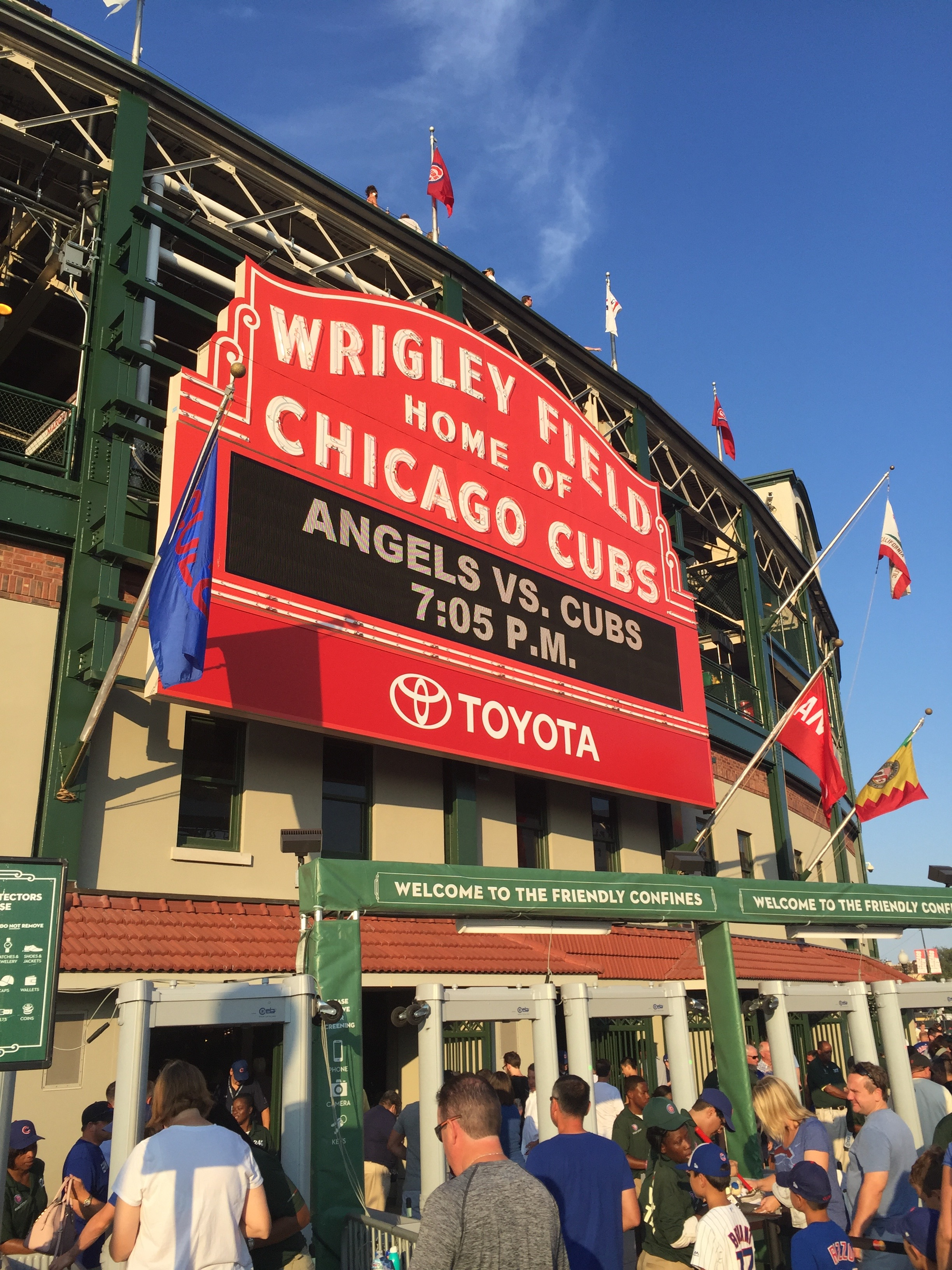
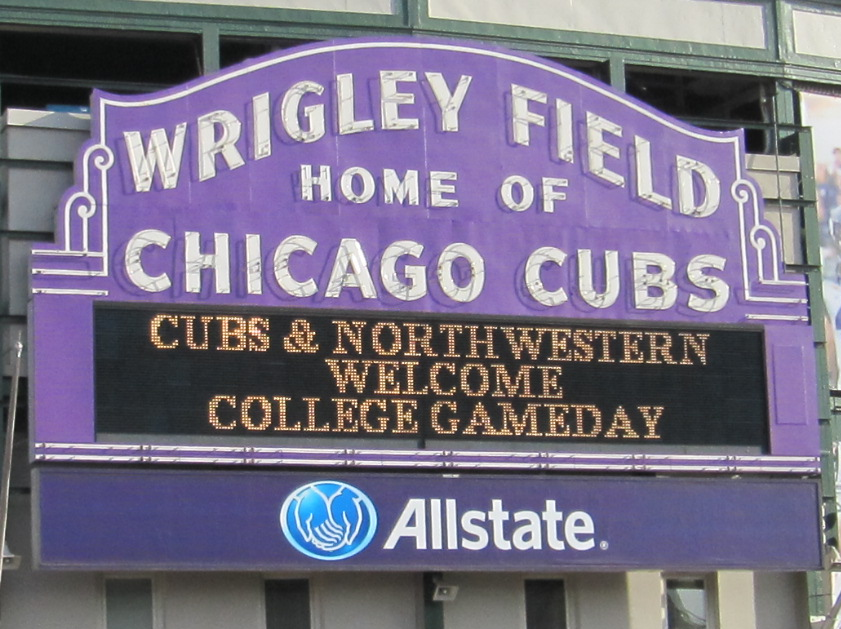
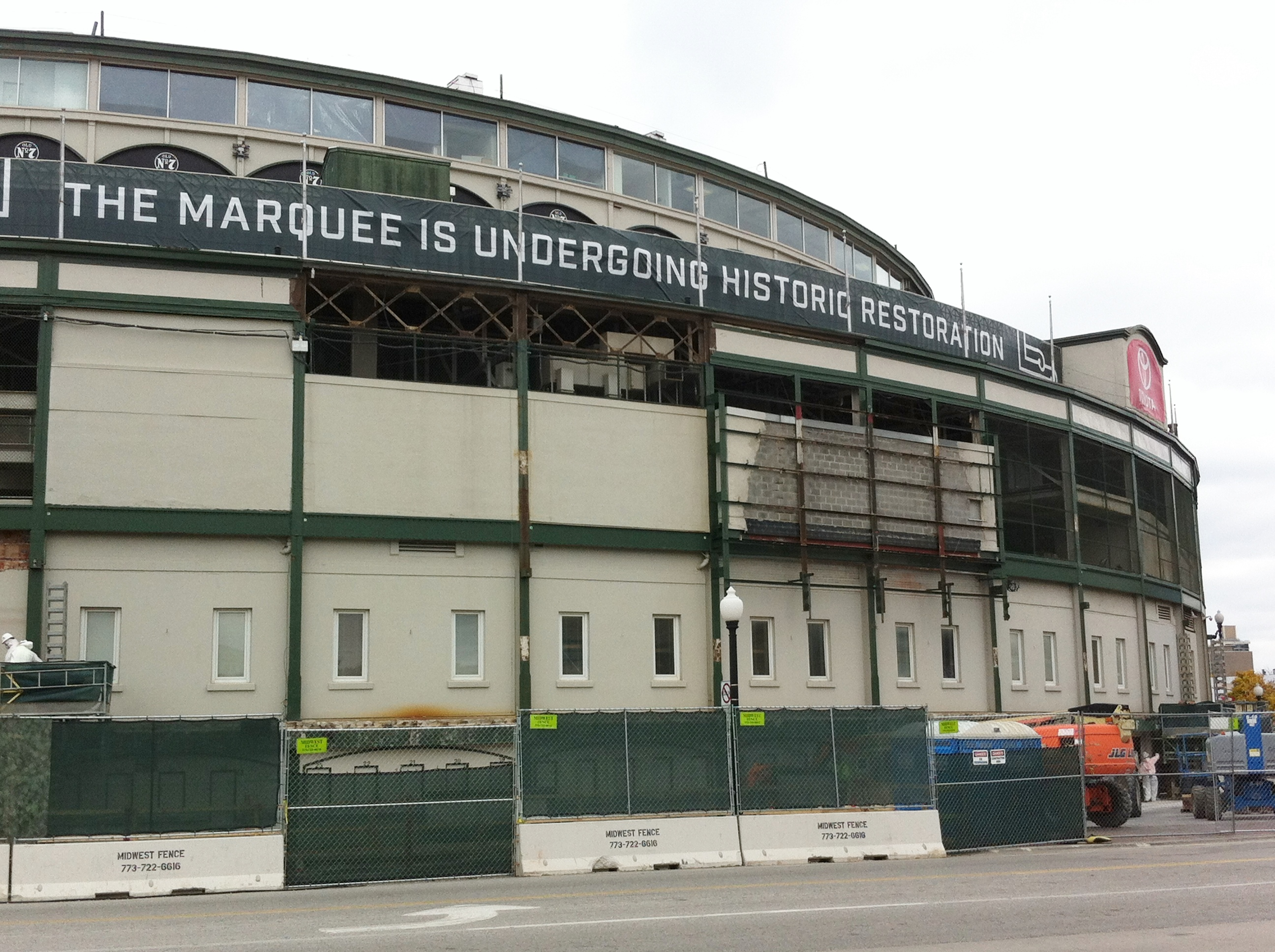
(Left) The marquee outside Wrigley Field; (Center) The marquee was temporarily painted purple for the 2010 Land of Lincoln Trophy college football game; (Right) Installed in 1934, the marquee was removed for restoration for the first time in 2015.

=== Lights ===
Wrigley Field LED lighting atop the first base and right field seats in 2024.

The Cubs were a holdout against night games for decades, not installing lights at Wrigley until 1988, after baseball officials announced that the park would be prohibited from hosting any future postseason games without lights. Before then, all games at Wrigley were played during the day. Night games are still limited in number by agreement with the city council. Since the introduction of night baseball at Wrigley, the Cubs have generally played their Friday home games in the afternoon, but since 2017, they were allowed some exemptions to host night games on a Friday. Examples include:

| Season | Date | Opponent | Score | Notes | Ref. |
|---|---|---|---|---|---|
| 2017 | September 8 | Milwaukee Brewers | 0–2 | The Cubs were given permission to host a Friday night game for the first time after having played a road evening game at the Pittsburgh Pirates on September 7. | |
| 2018 | September 14 | Cincinnati Reds | 3–2 | Originally scheduled for a 1:20pm CT start but was pushed to 7:05pm CT due to the Cubs' makeup game at the Washington Nationals the previous afternoon. | |
| 2020 | July 24 | Milwaukee Brewers | 3–0 | No fans in attendance due to COVID-19 restrictions. | |
| 2020 | July 31 | Pittsburgh Pirates | 6–3 | No fans in attendance due to COVID-19 restrictions. | |
| 2020 | August 14 | Milwaukee Brewers | 3–4 | No fans in attendance due to COVID-19 restrictions. | |
| 2020 | August 21 | Chicago White Sox | 1–10 | No fans in attendance due to COVID-19 restrictions. | |
| 2020 | September 4 | St. Louis Cardinals | 4–1 | No fans in attendance due to COVID-19 restrictions. | |
| 2020 | September 18 | Minnesota Twins | 1–0 | No fans in attendance due to COVID-19 restrictions. | |
| 2021 | June 18 | Miami Marlins | 2–10 | The Cubs were given permission to host a Friday night game after having played a road evening game at the New York Mets on June 17. | |
| 2021 | September 24 | St. Louis Cardinals | 4–12 | Second game of a split doubleheader. Originally scheduled on July 11 but was postponed due to rain. | |
| 2022 | April 22 | Pittsburgh Pirates | 2–4 | Moved to a 7:05pm CT start due to an inclement weather forecast in the afternoon. | |
| 2023 | July 14 | Boston Red Sox | 3–8 | This marked the first time that a Friday night game at Wrigley Field was scheduled in advance. This was also the first game for both teams following the All-Star Game. | |
| 2026 | July 17 | Minnesota Twins | 2–5 | First game for both teams following the All-Star Game. | |

The Cubs are also only allowed to host home games on Saturday and Sunday nights if Major League Baseball's national TV partners requested it.

In 1942, then-owner Philip K. Wrigley had planned to install lights, but the equipment was instead diverted for the World War II effort. On July 1, 1943, the All-American Girls Professional Baseball League's first midseason All-Star Game was played under temporary lights at Wrigley Field, between two teams composed of South Bend Blue Sox and Rockford Peaches players versus Kenosha Comets and Racine Belles players. It was also the first night game ever played in the ballpark.

The 1984 World Series was scheduled to start in the National League park, but MLB actually had a contingency plan to instead start the Series at the American League park in the event that the Cubs won the NLCS against the San Diego Padres. This would have allowed the Wrigley Field-hosted (i.e. daytime) games to be held over the weekend; in return, only one night game (game 3 on Friday) would have been lost. Had the Cubs advanced to the Series instead of the Padres, the Detroit Tigers would have hosted games 1, 2, 6, and 7 (on Tuesday and Wednesday nights), while the Cubs would have hosted games 3, 4, and 5 (on Friday, Saturday and Sunday), with all three games in Chicago starting no later than 1:30 p.m. CST. Since the Padres wound up winning the 1984 NLCS, these plans proved moot.

In the late 1980s, Cubs management threatened to leave Wrigley if lights were not installed. Major League Baseball threatened to make the Cubs play postseason "home" games at Busch Memorial Stadium in St. Louis. After 5,687 consecutive day games played by the Cubs at Wrigley, the lights were finally lit on August 8, 1988, for a game against the Philadelphia Phillies. However, that game was rained out after 3½ innings, and the first official night game took place the following evening against the New York Mets, whom the Cubs beat 6–4.

On November 7, 2022, Wrigley Field upgraded to LED field lights.

== Stadium usage ==
=== Baseball ===
Wrigley Field's first tenant was the Federal League team, the Chicago Whales, from 1914 to 1915. It has served as the home baseball park for Major League Baseball's Chicago Cubs franchise since 1916.

=== Football ===
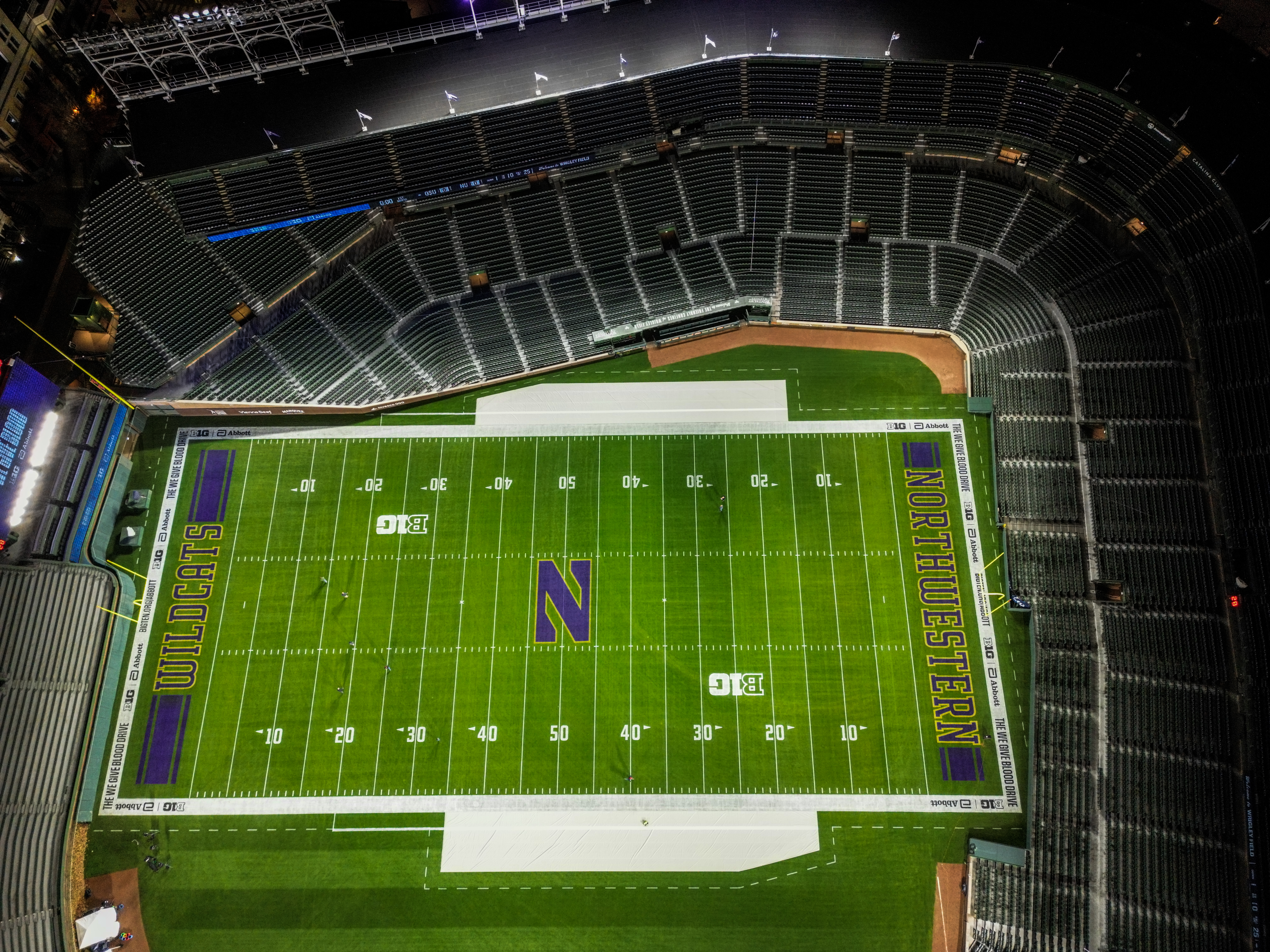
Wrigley Field with a football configuration for Northwestern

The Chicago Bears of the National Football League played at Wrigley Field for 50 years, from 1921 to 1970 before relocating to Soldier Field. The team had transferred from Decatur, and retained the name "Staleys" for the 1921 season. They renamed themselves the Bears in order to identify with the baseball team, then a common practice in the NFL. Wrigley Field once held the record for the most NFL games played in a single stadium, with 365 regular season games, but this record was surpassed in 2003 by Giants Stadium in New Jersey, thanks to its dual-occupancy by the New York Giants and New York Jets. On September 14, 2003, the game played between the Jets and Miami Dolphins was the 366th regular season NFL game at Giants Stadium, breaking Wrigley's regular season record. The 50 seasons the Bears spent at Wrigley Field had been an NFL record until 2006, when Lambeau Field duplicated this feat by hosting the Green Bay Packers for a 50th season and broke it in 2007. Soldier Field also matched the accomplishment when the Bears played there for their 50th season in 2021 and would break the record when the Bears played their 51st season in the venue in 2022.

Initially, the Bears worked with the stands that were there. Eventually, they acquired a large, portable bleacher section that spanned the right and center field areas and covered most of the existing bleacher seating and part of the right field corner seating. This "East Stand" raised Wrigley's football capacity to about 47,000, or a net gain of perhaps 9,000 seats over normal capacity. After the Bears left, this structure would live on for several years as the "North Stand" at Soldier Field, until it was replaced by permanent seating.

The football field ran north-to-south, i.e. from left field to the foul side of first base. The remodeling of the bleachers made for a very tight fit for the gridiron. In fact, the corner of the south end zone was literally in the visiting baseball team's dugout, which was filled with pads for safety, and required a special ground rule that sliced off that corner of the end zone. The end zone was also shorter than the north, as the south end zone was eight yards, compared to the regulation ten yards. One corner of the north end line ran just inches short of the left field wall. There is a legend that Bears fullback Bronko Nagurski steamrolled through the line head down, and ran all the way through that end zone, smacking his leather-helmeted head on the bricks. He went back to the bench and told then-coach George Halas, "That last guy gave me quite a lick!" That kind of incident prompted the Bears to hang some padding in front of the wall.

The Bears are second only to the Packers in total NFL championships, and all but one of those (their only Super Bowl championship) came during their tenure at Wrigley. After a half-century, they found themselves compelled to move as the NFL wanted every one of its stadiums to seat at least 50,000 as a result of the then-recent AFL–NFL merger. The Bears held one game at Dyche Stadium (now Ryan Field) on the Northwestern University campus in 1970, but otherwise continued at Wrigley until their transfer to the lakefront ended their five-decade run on the north side.

One remnant of the Bears' time at Wrigley was uncovered during the offseason rebuilding of the playing field between 2007 and 2008: the foundations for the goal posts. Five NFL championship games were played at Wrigley Field: 1933, 1937, 1941, 1943, and 1963. Coupled with the Chicago Bears, the Chicago Cardinals (now the Arizona Cardinals) of the NFL called Wrigley Field home from 1931 to 1939. Born on the South Side of Chicago, the Cardinals also played their home games at Normal Park, Comiskey Park, and Soldier Field.

The Northwestern Wildcats and the Illinois Fighting Illini played a college football game at Wrigley Field on November 20, 2010. It was the first football game at Wrigley Field since 1970, and the first collegiate football game there since 1938, when the DePaul Blue Demons played its regular games at Wrigley. The field used an east–west field configuration (third base to right field). In order to keep the playing field at regulation size, the safety clearances for each end zone to the walls in the field were considerably less than normal. In particular, the east (right field) end zone came under scrutiny as its end zone was wedged extremely close to the right field wall (as close as one foot in some areas), forcing the goal posts to be hung from the right field wall in order to fit. Despite extra padding provided in these locations, it was decided that all offensive plays for both teams play to the west end zone, where there was more safety clearance. The east end zone could still be used on defensive and special teams touchdowns, as well as defensive safeties; and, in fact, there was one interception run back for an eastbound touchdown. Big Ten Commissioner Jim Delany said that, as late as three days before the game, he had only been apprised that the situation wasn't "anything other than tight". When he had a chance to fully vet the situation, however, he concluded that the space surrounding the east end zone was smaller than the minimum of six feet stipulated in NCAA rules, and it would have been too great of a risk to allow offensive plays to be run toward that end zone. The Fighting Illini won the game 48–27, taking home the Land of Lincoln Trophy, which was introduced in 2009.

Northwestern football returned to Wrigley Field in 2021 and 2023, and hosted two games at Wrigley Field during stadium reconstruction in 2024. They hosted two more at Wrigley Field in 2025. During the 2017 offseason, the home (third base) dugout and adjacent seating were redesigned to be portable, and the playing field will accommodate a regulation size 120-yard football field that will run east–west, unlike the Bears, when the stadium was north–south. During most of the Bears' run in Wrigley Field, the goal posts were located on the goal line as was NFL rules until 1975, not the end line as it was in college and after 1974, the NFL, which made the deeper end zones relevant. A Northwestern football game had also been scheduled for Wrigley in 2020, but was relocated to Northwestern's Ryan Field due to the COVID-19 pandemic. As a makeup, Northwestern relocated their 2021 home game against Purdue to Wrigley Field, which was held in November. The Wildcats also hosted Iowa in November 2023. The Wildcats hosted Ohio State on November 16, 2024, and the Fighting Illini November 30, 2024.

=== Soccer ===
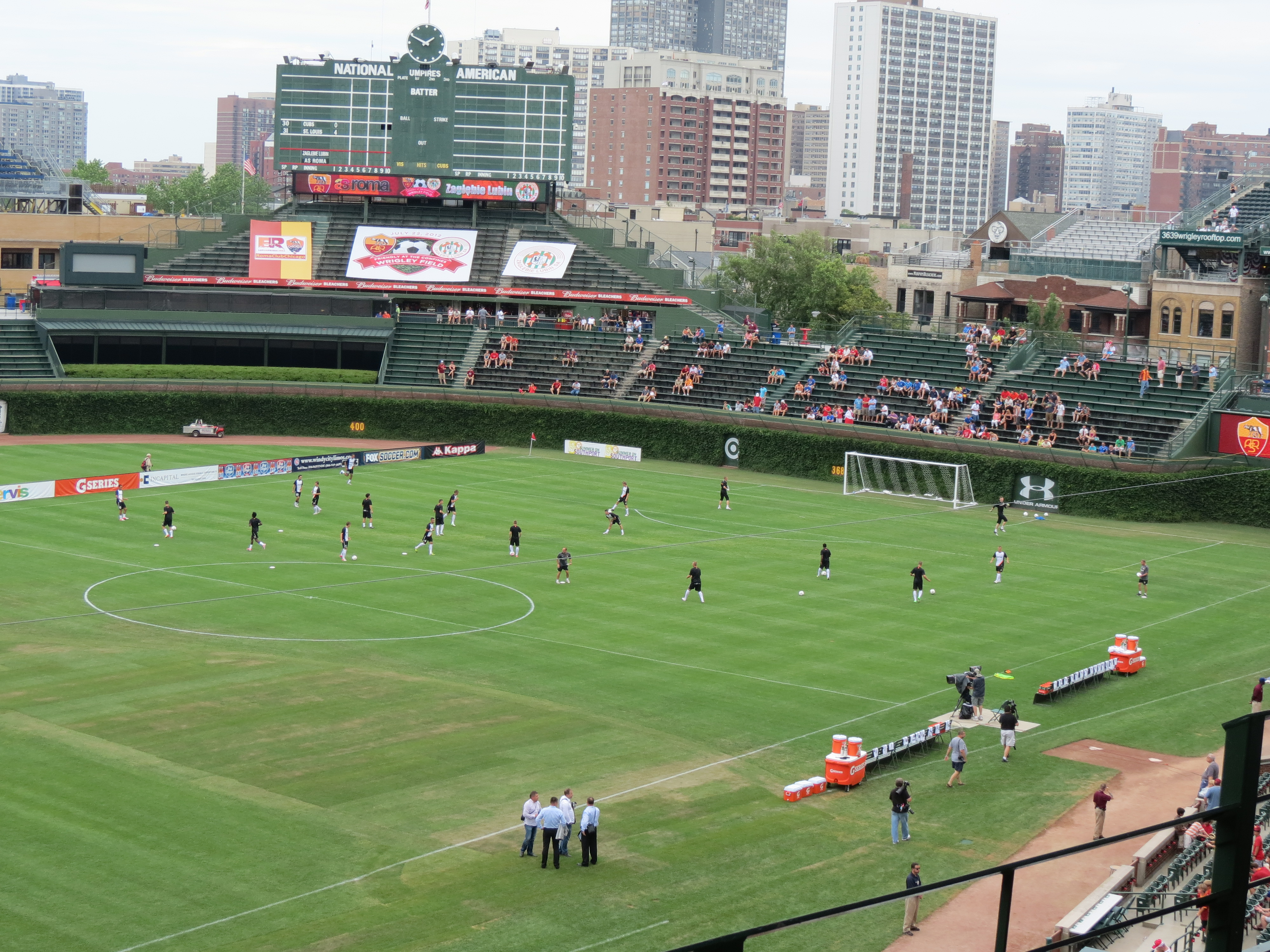
Wrigley Field configured for soccer in 2012.

The Chicago Sting of the North American Soccer League (NASL) used Wrigley, along with Comiskey Park, for their home matches during the late 1970s and early 1980s. The Sting hosted the San Diego Sockers at Wrigley on August 25, 1979, when the Bears were using Soldier Field. Unlike the Bears' football layout, the soccer pitch ran east to west, from right field to the foul territory on the third base side. Soccer returned to Wrigley Field in July 2012, when Italian club A.S. Roma defeated Poland's Zaglebie Lubin 4–0 in a friendly match with 22,181 spectators. A regular season National Women's Soccer League match between the Chicago Red Stars and Bay FC was played at Wrigley Field on June 8, 2024. They were the first women's teams to play at the stadium since 1943 and broke the league's attendance record with 35,038 spectators; the Red Stars lost 2–1.

=== Hockey ===
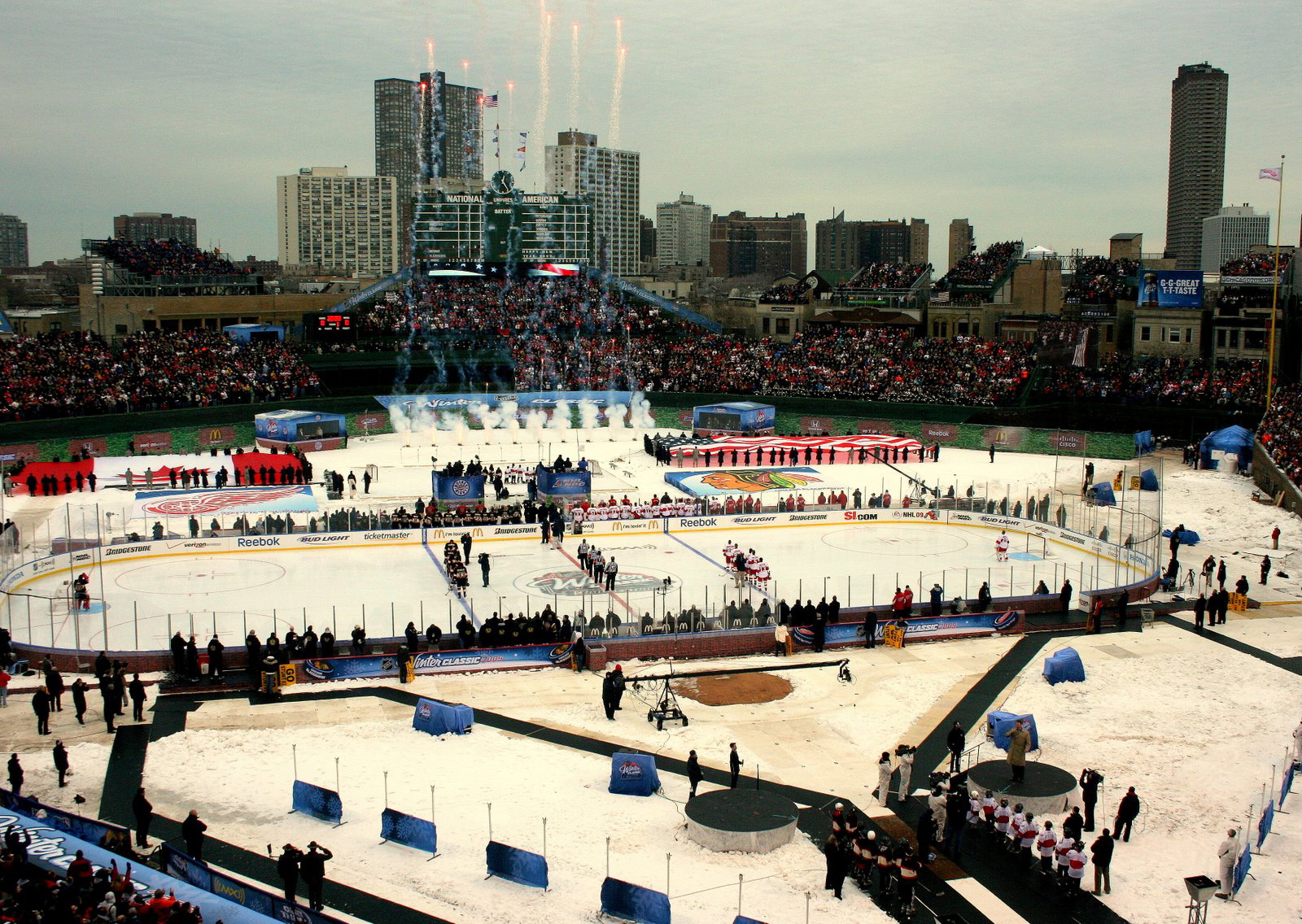
Hockey rink layout during the 2009 NHL Winter Classic between the Blackhawks and Red Wings

On January 1, 2009, the National Hockey League played its 2009 Winter Classic at Wrigley Field, pitting two "Original Six" teams – the host Chicago Blackhawks and the visiting Detroit Red Wings – in an outdoor ice hockey game. The rink ran across the field from first base to third base with second base being covered by roughly the center of the rink. The attendance for this game was 40,818. The Red Wings won 6–4. Wrigley Field also hosted the 2025 NHL Winter Classic on December 31, 2024, between the Chicago Blackhawks and the St. Louis Blues. The attendance for this game was 40,933. The Blues won 6–2. Held in conjunction with this was Wrigley Field's first collegiate ice hockey event, the Frozen Confines.

=== Concerts ===
Since 2005, Wrigley Field has been opened on a limited basis to popular concerts, but not without some controversy. Local neighborhood groups have expressed concerns about the impact of concert crowds and noise on the surrounding residential neighborhood, particularly in 2009, when three concerts were added to the schedule, one conflicting with an annual neighborhood festival.

=== List of concerts ===
| Date | Artist | Opening act(s) | Tour / Concert name | Attendance | Revenue | Notes |
|---|---|---|---|---|---|---|
| September 4, 2005 | Jimmy Buffett | — | A Salty Piece of Land Tour | 78,755 / 78,755 | $7,897,550 | These shows were his first ever at the ballpark and were captured on DVD with the release "Live in Wrigley Field". |
| September 5, 2005 | Jimmy Buffett | — | A Salty Piece of Land Tour | 78,755 / 78,755 | $7,897,550 | These shows were his first ever at the ballpark and were captured on DVD with the release "Live in Wrigley Field". |
| July 5, 2007 | The Police | Fiction Plane | The Police Reunion Tour | 79,458 / 79,458 | $9,494,248 | |
| July 6, 2007 | The Police | Fiction Plane | The Police Reunion Tour | 79,458 / 79,458 | $9,494,248 | |
| July 16, 2009 | Elton John; Billy Joel | - | Face to Face 2009 | 77,520 / 77,520 | $11,154,840 | |
| July 18, 2009 | Rascal Flatts | Dierks Bentley; Darius Rucker | American Living Unstoppable Tour | 36,500 / 36,500 | $2,512,250 | The first country music group to play the ballpark. |
| July 21, 2009 | Elton John; Billy Joel | — | Face to Face 2009 | (Note: The score data is representative of the two shows at Wrigley Field on 16 July and 21 July respectively.) | | |
| September 17, 2010 | Dave Matthews Band | Jason Mraz | Summer 2010 Tour | 78,302 / 78,302 | $5,942,991 | These show were recorded for the album "Live at Wrigley Field" with Night 1 only being released in the Double Play edition. |
| September 18, 2010 | Dave Matthews Band | Jason Mraz | Summer 2010 Tour | 78,302 / 78,302 | $5,942,991 | These show were recorded for the album "Live at Wrigley Field" with Night 1 only being released in the Double Play edition. |
| July 31, 2011 | Paul McCartney | DJ Chris Holmes | On the Run | 83,988 / 83,988 | $10,929,728 | This was his first visit to Chicago since 2005. |
| August 1, 2011 | Paul McCartney | DJ Chris Holmes | On the Run | 83,988 / 83,988 | $10,929,728 | This was his first visit to Chicago since 2005. |
| June 8, 2012 | Roger Waters | — | The Wall Live | 36,881 / 36,881 | $4,388,860 | |
| June 9, 2012 | Brad Paisley | Miranda Lambert; Chris Young; The Band Perry; Jerrod Niemann | Virtual Reality World Tour | 37,889 / 37,889 | $3,012,600 | |
| September 7, 2012 | Bruce Springsteen & The E Street Band | — | Wrecking Ball World Tour | 84,218 / 84,218 | $7,090,141 | Eddie Vedder was the special guest. |
| September 8, 2012 | Bruce Springsteen & The E Street Band | — | Wrecking Ball World Tour | 84,218 / 84,218 | $7,090,141 | Eddie Vedder was the special guest. |
| July 19, 2013 | Pearl Jam | — | Lightning Bolt Tour | — | — | The show became the fastest concert to sell-out at Wrigley Field. The show was interrupted for more than two hours due to the threat of lightning. |
| July 20, 2013 | Jason Aldean | Miranda Lambert; Thomas Rhett; Jake Owen; DeeJay Silver | 2013 Night Train Tour | 39,846 / 39,846 | $3,111,156 | Footage from this show was featured in a live concert DVD entitled 'Night Train to Georgia'. Kelly Clarkson was the special guest. |
| July 18, 2014 | Billy Joel | Gavin DeGraw | Billy Joel in Concert | 41,957 / 41,957 | $4,668,557 | |
| July 19, 2014 | Blake Shelton | The Band Perry; Dan + Shay; Neal McCoy | 2014 Ten Times Crazier Tour | 40,912 / 40,912 | $2,697,990 | This was his first stadium show at the ballpark. |
| September 13, 2014 | Zac Brown Band | — | The Great American Road Trip Tour | 37,467 / 41,495 | $2,906,949 | |
| August 27, 2015 | Billy Joel | Gavin DeGraw | Billy Joel in Concert | 41,183 / 41,183 | $4,521,252 | |
| August 29, 2015 | Foo Fighters | Cheap Trick; Naked Raygun; Urge Overkill | Sonic Highways World Tour | 40,788 / 40,788 | $2,501,510 | Cheap Trick and Urge Overkill were special guests. |
| September 11, 2015 | Zac Brown Band | — | Jekyll and Hyde Tour | 40,039 / 40,162 | $2,836,616 | |
| September 15, 2015 | AC/DC | Vintage Trouble | Rock or Bust World Tour | 29,732 / 29,732 | $3,024,480 | |
| June 24, 2016 | Phish | — | 2016 Summer Tour | 83,588 / 84,356 | $4,761,063 | These shows were webcast via Live Phish. During the second show, Happy Birthday was played for Phish tour manager Richard Glasgow. |
| June 25, 2016 | Phish | — | 2016 Summer Tour | 83,588 / 84,356 | $4,761,063 | These shows were webcast via Live Phish. During the second show, Happy Birthday was played for Phish tour manager Richard Glasgow. |
| June 30, 2016 | James Taylor | Jackson Browne | Before This World Tour | 39,441 / 40,624 | $3,951,938 | |
| August 20, 2016 | Pearl Jam | — | 2016 North America Tour | 83,478 / 84,951 | $5,712,625 | At their second show, Dennis Rodman was the special guest. |
| August 22, 2016 | Pearl Jam | — | 2016 North America Tour | 83,478 / 84,951 | $5,712,625 | At their second show, Dennis Rodman was the special guest. |
| August 26, 2016 | Billy Joel | — | Billy Joel in Concert | 41,997 / 41,997 | $4,876,038 | |
| August 27, 2016 | Luke Bryan | Little Big Town; Dustin Lynch; DJ Rock | Kill the Lights Tour | 41,819 / 41,819 | $4,457,358 | |
| June 29, 2017 | Tom Petty & The Heartbreakers | Chris Stapleton | 40th Anniversary Tour | 40,345 / 40,345 | $4,169,953 | |
| June 30, 2017 | Dead & Company | — | Dead & Company Summer Tour 2017 | 79,489 / 86,856 | $6,357,746 | The July 1 show set the attendance record for the most tickets sold for a single concert at Wrigley Field, with 43,600 sold. |
| July 1, 2017 | Dead & Company | — | Dead & Company Summer Tour 2017 | 79,489 / 86,856 | $6,357,746 | The July 1 show set the attendance record for the most tickets sold for a single concert at Wrigley Field, with 43,600 sold. |
| July 15, 2017 | Jimmy Buffett | Huey Lewis and the News | I Don't Know Tour 2017 | 41,788 / 42,309 | $4,211,407 | |
| July 17, 2017 | James Taylor | Bonnie Raitt | 2017 US Summer Tour | 28,890 / 41,688 | $2,380,017 | |
| August 11, 2017 | Billy Joel | — | Billy Joel in Concert | 41,920 / 41,920 | $4,694,156 | |
| August 12, 2017 | Florida Georgia Line | Backstreet Boys; Nelly; Chris Lane | Smooth Tour | 42,387 / 42,387 | $3,387,468 | |
| August 24, 2017 | Green Day | Catfish and the Bottlemen | Revolution Radio Tour | 32,491 / 42,442 | $1,901,635 | |
| August 25, 2017 | Lady Gaga | DJ White Shadow | Joanne World Tour | 41,847 / 41,847 | $5,213,820 | First female performer to headline at the ballpark. |
| August 26, 2017 | Zac Brown Band | Hunter Hayes | Welcome Home Tour | 40,603 / 42,196 | $3,269,267 | |
| July 13, 2018 | Jimmy Buffett | Boz Scaggs | | | | |
| July 14, 2018 | Def Leppard; Journey | The Pretenders | Def Leppard & Journey 2018 Tour | 35,528 / 35,528 | $3,331,079 | |
| July 29, 2018 | Foo Fighters | Melkbelly; The Struts | Concrete and Gold Tour | 76,299 / 76,299 | $6,490,979 | |
| July 30, 2018 | Foo Fighters | Touched by Ghoul; The Breeders | Concrete and Gold Tour | 76,299 / 76,299 | $6,490,979 | |
| August 18, 2018 | Pearl Jam | — | Pearl Jam 2018 Tour | 83,100 / 83,348 | $7,106,534 | |
| August 20, 2018 | Pearl Jam | — | Pearl Jam 2018 Tour | 83,100 / 83,348 | $7,106,534 | |
| September 1, 2018 | Luke Bryan | Sam Hunt; Jon Pardi; Morgan Wallen | What Makes You Country Tour | 40,013 / 40,013 | $3,217,012 | |
| September 7, 2018 | Billy Joel | — | Billy Joel in Concert | 41,180 / 41,180 | $4,763,850 | |
| September 8, 2018 | Fall Out Boy | Rise Against; Machine Gun Kelly | Mania Tour | TBA | TBA | |
| June 14, 2019 | Dead & Company | — | Dead & Company Summer Tour 2019 | 72,851 / 83,234 | $7,055,528 | |
| June 15, 2019 | Dead & Company | — | Dead & Company Summer Tour 2019 | 72,851 / 83,234 | $7,055,528 | |
| August 15, 2021 | Green Day; Fall Out Boy; Weezer | The Interrupters | Hella Mega Tour | 39,729 / 39,729 | $4,526,940 | Originally August 13, 2020; but was postponed due to the COVID-19 pandemic. |
| August 29, 2021 | Aventura | — | Inmortal Stadium Tour | 27,924 / 27,924 | $2,530,617 | |
| September 16, 2021 | Guns N' Roses | Mammoth WVH | Guns N' Roses 2020 Tour | 23,464 / 28,959 | $2,734,917 | Originally July 26, 2020; but was postponed due to the COVID-19 pandemic. After the band's show, Rose released a statement saying he was suffering from food poisoning during the show, but he performed the show in full. |
| August 12, 2023 | P!nk | Grouplove; KidCutUp; Pat Benatar; Neil Giraldo | Summer Carnival | | | |
| August 15, 2022 | Lady Gaga | — | The Chromatica Ball | 43,019 / 43,019 | $6,905,799 | Originally August 14, 2020, then August 27, 2021; but was postponed due to the COVID-19 pandemic. |
| August 25, 2023 | Jonas Brothers | Lawrence | Five Albums. One Night. The World Tour | | | |
| July 15, 2024 | Def Leppard; Journey | Steve Miller Band | The Summer Stadium Tour | | | |
| August 13, 2024 | Green Day | The Smashing Pumpkins; Rancid; The Linda Lindas | The Saviors Tour | | | |
| August 29, 2024 | Pearl Jam | Glen Hansard | Dark Matter World Tour | 81,910 / 81,910 | $13,689,882 | |
| August 31, 2024 | Pearl Jam | Glen Hansard | Dark Matter World Tour | 81,910 / 81,910 | $13,689,882 | |
| May 22, 2025 | Post Malone; Jelly Roll | Sierra Ferrell | Big Ass Stadium Tour | | | |
| June 26, 2025 | Stray Kids | | Dominate World Tour | | | |
| August 28, 2025 | Chris Brown | Summer Walker; Bryson Tiller | Breezy Bowl XX Tour | | | |
| June 11, 2026 | Mumford & Sons | Caamp; Dylan Gossett | Prizefighter Tour | | | |
| June 12, 2026 | Rufus Du Sol | N/A | 2026 tour | | | |
| July 11, 2026 | John Mulaney | Live At Wrigley Field | | | | |
| July 12, 2026 | Tyler Childers | Jon Batiste; Wednesday | Snipe Hunt Tour | | | |
| July 14, 2026 | Noah Kahan | Gigi Perez; Annabelle Dinda | The Great Divide Tour | 80,000 / 80,000 | | |
| July 15, 2026 | Noah Kahan | Gigi Perez; Annabelle Dinda | The Great Divide Tour | 80,000 / 80,000 | | |

== Traditions and mainstays ==
=== Corporate sponsorship ===
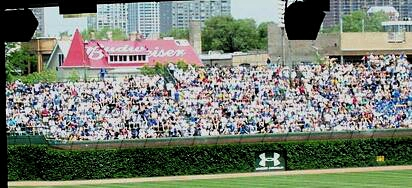
Some Wrigley Field advertising in 2007

Wrigley Field shares its name with the Wrigley Company, as the park was named for its then-owner William Wrigley Jr., the company's CEO. As early as the 1920s, before the park became officially known as Wrigley Field, the scoreboard was topped by the elf-like "Doublemint Twins", posed as a pitcher and a batter. There were also ads painted on the bare right field wall early in the ballpark's history, prior to the 1923 remodeling, which put bleachers there. After that, the Doublemint elves were the only visible in-park advertising. The elves were removed permanently in 1937, when the bleachers and scoreboard were rebuilt. It would be about 44 years before in-park advertising would reappear.

Ironically given the roots of its name, Wrigley Field had been a notable exception to the trend of selling corporate naming rights to sporting venues. The Tribune Company, the owners of the park from 1981 to 2009, chose not to rename the ballpark, utilizing other ways to bring in corporate sponsorship. During the mid-1980s, Anheuser-Busch placed Budweiser and Bud Light advertisements beneath the center field scoreboard. Bud Light became the sponsor of the rebuilt bleachers in 2006.

In the early 2000s, following the trend of many ballparks, a green-screen chroma key board was installed behind home plate in the line of sight of the center field camera to allow electronic "rotating" advertisements visible only to TV audiences. By 2006, the board was set up to allow advertisements to be both physical and electronic (they can be seen in both live and replay shots).

In 2007, the first on-field advertising appeared since the park's early days. Sporting goods firm Under Armour placed its logo on the double-doors between the ivy on the outfield wall in left-center and right-center fields. Advertisements were also placed in the dugouts, originally for Sears department stores, then Walter E. Smithe furniture and currently State Farm insurance.

For 2008 and 2009, the Cubs worked out an agreement with Cboe Global Markets to allow CBOE to auction 71 box seat season tickets and award naming rights.

For the 2009 season, the Cubs announced that the renovated restaurant space in the southeast corner of Wrigley Field, formerly known as the Friendly Confines Cafe, would be renamed the Captain Morgan Club.

On October 27, 2009, Thomas S. Ricketts officially took over 95% ownership of the Cubs and Wrigley Field, and 20% ownership of Comcast SportsNet Chicago. The Tribune retained 5% ownership. Ricketts, however, has expressed no interest in selling the naming rights to the park, preferring that it retain the name it has used since 1926.

==== Outside venues ====
Corporate sponsorship has not been limited to the park itself. Wrigley Field has a view of the neighborhood buildings across Waveland and Sheffield Avenues. In addition to spectators standing or sitting on the apartment roofs, corporate sponsors have frequently taken advantage of those locations as well. In the earliest days of Weeghman Park, one building across Sheffield Avenue advertised a local hangout known as Bismarck Gardens (later called the Marigold Gardens after World War I). That same building has since advertised for the Torco Oil Company, Southwest Airlines, the Miller Brewing Company, and Gilbert's Craft Sausages.

A building across from deep right-center field was topped by a neon sign for Baby Ruth candy beginning in the mid-1930s and running for some 40 years. That placement by the Chicago-based Curtiss Candy Company (which is now under Nestlé), coincidentally positioned in the line of sight of "Babe Ruth's called shot", proved fortuitous when games began to be televised in the 1940s—the sign was also in the line of sight of the ground level camera behind and to the left of home plate. The aging sign was eventually removed in the early 1970s.

Another long-standing venue for a sign is the sloping roof of a building behind left-center field. Unsuitable for the bleachers that now decorate many of those buildings, that building's angling roof has been painted in the form of a large billboard since at least the 1940s. In recent years, it has borne a bright-red Budweiser sign, and beginning in 2009, an advertisement for Horseshoe Casino. Other buildings have carried signs sponsoring beers, such as Old Style (when it was a Cubs broadcasting sponsor) and Miller, and also WGN-TV, which has telecast Cubs games since April 1948.

==== Legacy partners ====
In January 2013, the Ricketts family launched "Legacy Partners", a marketing effort to sell new advertising in and around the renovated Wrigley Field. In conjunction with the new "W Partners", the Cubs entered into 10-year agreements with its largest advertisers.

1. – Anheuser-Busch
2. – Under Armour
3. – ATI Physical Therapy, a national Sports Medicine and Rehabilitation organization
4. – Wintrust Financial Corporation, a Chicago-based regional bank holding company
5. – Sloan Valve
6. – American Airlines
7. – Nuveen Investments
8. – Advocate Health Care, the largest health care provider in Illinois.
9. – Toyota Motor Corporation A permanent position just below the Clark and Addison marquee and other signage in and around the park and Wrigley Field parking lots.
10. – PepsiCo

=== Win flag ===
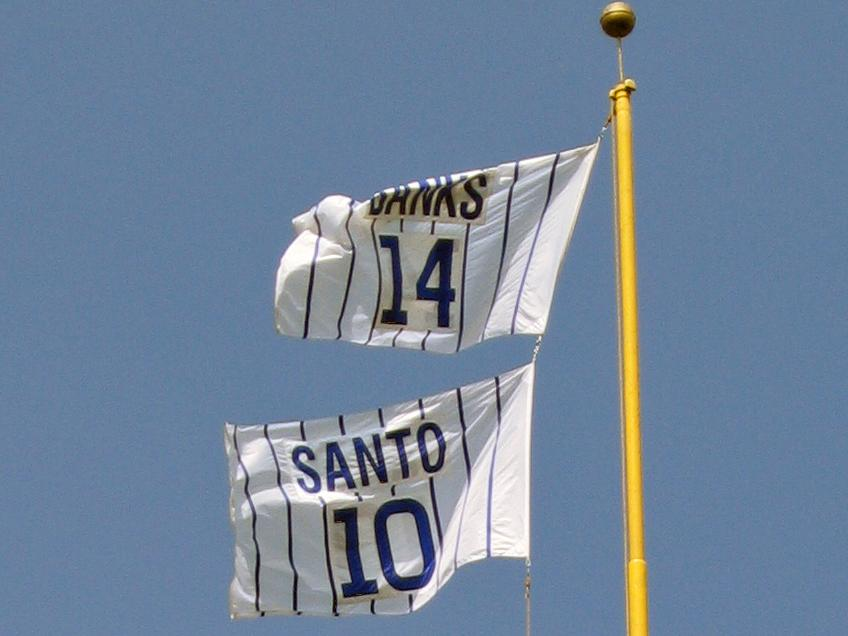
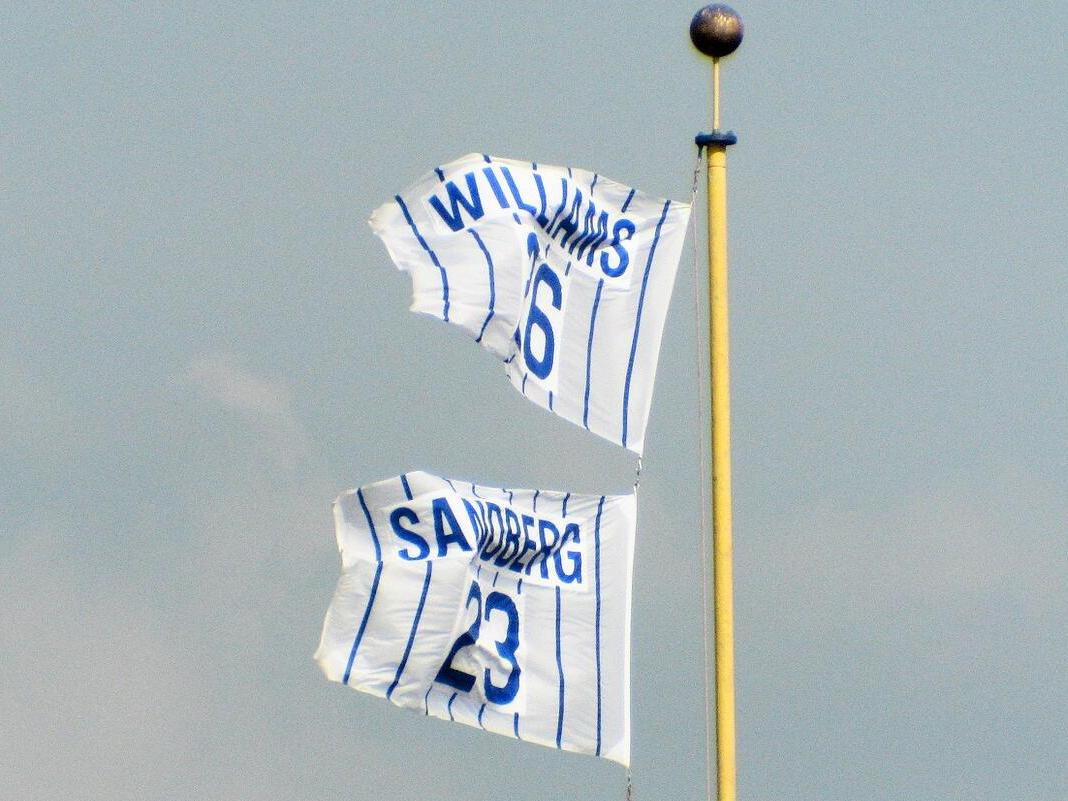
Retired numbers for Ernie Banks and Ron Santo on the left field foulpole and for Billy Williams and Ryne Sandberg on the right field foulpole. Since May 3, 2009, the number 31 also flies on both foul poles, to honor Ferguson Jenkins (left field) and Greg Maddux (right field).

Beginning in the days of P.K. Wrigley and the 1937 bleacher/scoreboard reconstruction, a flag with either a "W" or an "L" has flown from atop the scoreboard masthead, indicating the day's result. In case of a doubleheader that is split, both flags are flown.

Past Cubs media guides show that the original flags were blue with a white "W" and white with a blue "L", the latter coincidentally suggesting "surrender". In 1978, blue and white lights were mounted atop the scoreboard, to further denote wins and losses.

The flags were replaced in the early 1980s, and the color schemes were reversed with the "win flag" being white with a blue W, and the "loss flag" the opposite. In 1982, the retired number of Ernie Banks was flying on a foul pole, as white with blue numbers, in 1987, the retired number of Billy Williams joined Banks, the two flags were positioned from the foul poles, Banks from left field, and Williams from right field. Later on, the team retired numbers for Ron Santo, Ryne Sandberg, Ferguson Jenkins and Greg Maddux, with Jenkins and Maddux both using the same number (31).

Keeping with tradition, fans are known to bring win flags to home and away games, displaying them after a Cubs win. Flags are also sold at the ballpark. On April 24, 2008, the Cubs flew an extra white flag displaying "10,000" in blue, along with the win flag, as the 10,000th win in team history was achieved on the road the previous night. Alongside the tradition of the "W" and "L" flags, the song "Go, Cubs, Go" is sung after each home win (it was also sung by visiting Cubs fans in game 7 of the 2016 World Series at Progressive Field in Cleveland, where the Cubs clinched their first championship since 1908). Also, following the 2015 addition of the park's Daktronics video screens, the large "W" in the "Wintrust" logo on the left field video screen is kept on following Cubs' wins.

=== "Take Me Out to the Ball Game" ===
The tradition of singing "Take Me Out to the Ball Game" at Cubs home games began when Hall of Fame announcer Harry Caray arrived in 1982 (he had sung it the preceding seven years as a broadcaster for the White Sox), and has remained a Wrigley Field staple. After Caray's death, the tradition of a guest conductor began, with former baseball players, other sports stars, actors, and other celebrities invited to sing during the Seventh Inning Stretch. Among the best-known guests have been the actor Bill Murray, former Bears coach Mike Ditka, former Cubs second baseman Ryne Sandberg, former pitcher Mike Krukow, former longtime Cubs first baseman Mark Grace, former Houston Rockets star Tracy McGrady, Chicago Blackhawks forwards Jonathan Toews and Patrick Kane, Chicago Bears quarterback Jay Cutler, comedian Jay Leno, NASCAR driver Jeff Gordon, singers Ozzy Osbourne and Eddie Vedder, former Chicago lead singer Peter Cetera, boxer and actor Mr. T, actor and lifelong Cub fan Gary Sinise, actors Tom Arnold, James Belushi, WWE wrestler/Chicago native CM Punk, Vince Vaughn, actress Melissa McCarthy, and Illinois-native country music singer Brett Eldredge.

This performance is regularly shown during Cubs TV broadcasts regardless of its broadcast partner, and occasionally during MLB national TV broadcasts.

=== Organ music ===
Wrigley Field was the first Major League ballpark to introduce live organ music on April 26, 1941. The stadium's first organist was Ray Nelson. As of July 2019, organist Gary Pressy, holds the record for 2,653 consecutive games played, never having missed a day's work in 33 years. Today, most major league ballparks have replaced the traditional live organist with canned music programmed by a DJ. Pressy says: "I don't think it's a dying art, especially at Wrigley Field ... The team respects tradition."

=== Writing on the Wall ===
During the 2016 postseason, someone wrote a message in chalk on the outer brick wall of the stadium along Waveland and Sheffield avenues. This started a chain reaction and more fans began to write their own messages on the wall. The messages were anything from words of support expressed towards the team or just a name. Chalk covered a majority of the wall, to the point where fans had to bring step ladders in order to reach upper spaces for their message. The Cubs themselves encouraged the event by supplying chalk and adding extra security. The event gained both local and national attention, receiving coverage from Fox Sports and The Boston Globe.

== In popular culture ==
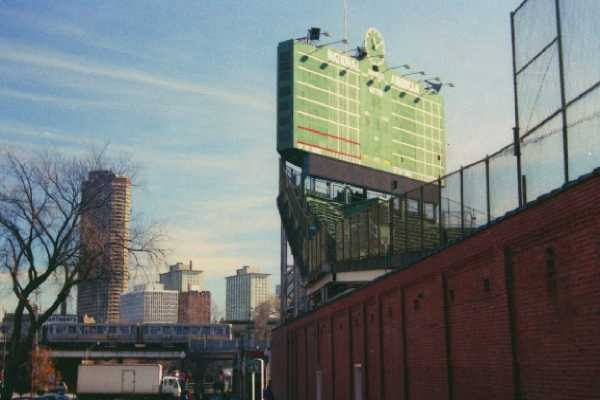
The north exterior of Wrigley Field, with manual scoreboard visible, as it appears during the offseason. This picture was taken prior to the outfield bleacher expansion, which brought the bleachers over the sidewalk.

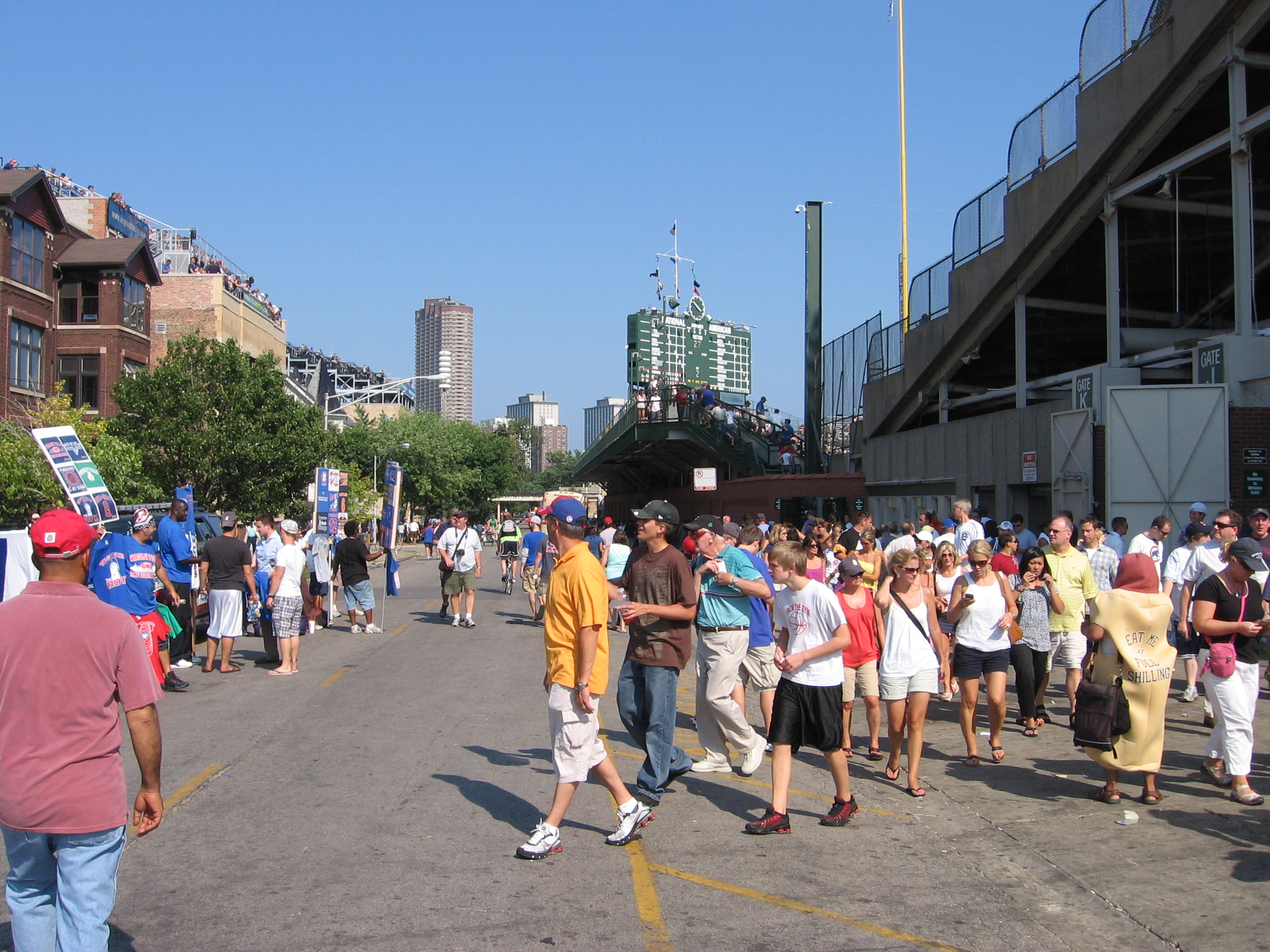
Fans on Waveland Avenue during a 2009 game.

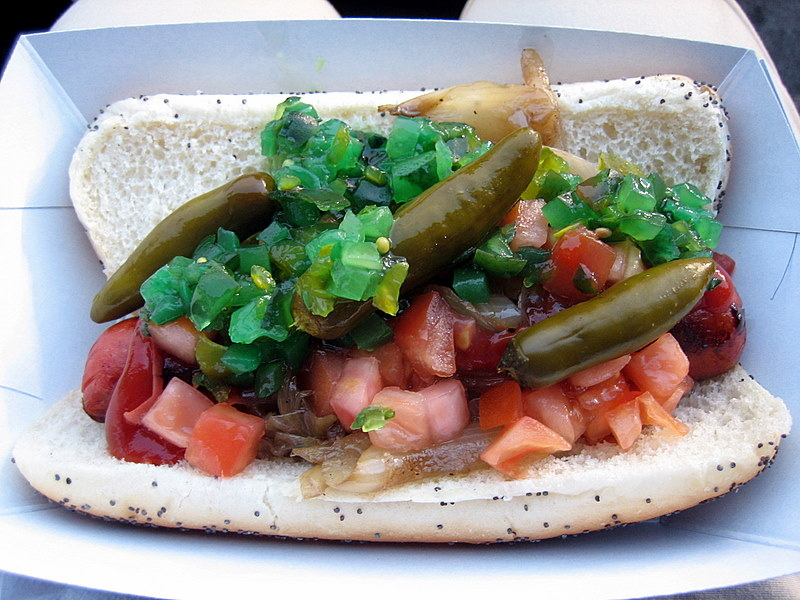
Chicago style hot dog sold at Wrigley Field

Wrigley Field had a brief cameo in the 1980 film The Blues Brothers, starring John Belushi and Dan Aykroyd as Jake and Elwood Blues. In the film, Elwood lists 1060 W. Addison as his fake home address on his Illinois driver's license, tricking the police and later the Illinois Nazis listening on police radio into heading for Wrigley Field. The 1984 film The Natural, starring Robert Redford, had a scene set at Wrigley but was actually filmed at All-High Stadium in Buffalo, New York. All other baseball action scenes in that movie were shot in Buffalo, at the since-demolished War Memorial Stadium.

During Cubs games, fans will often stand outside the park on Waveland Avenue, waiting for home run balls hit over the wall and out of the park. However, as a tradition, Cubs fans inside and sometimes even outside the park will promptly throw any home run ball hit by an opposing player back onto the field of play, a ritual depicted in the 1977 stage play Bleacher Bums and in the 1993 film Rookie of the Year.

The ballpark was featured in a scene in the 1986 film Ferris Bueller's Day Off, where the outside marquee read "Save Ferris". The director, John Hughes, originally wanted to film at Comiskey Park (he was a White Sox fan) but the team was out of town during filming. The 2006 film The Break-Up used Wrigley Field as the setting for its opening scene. An early 1990s film about Babe Ruth had the obligatory scene in Wrigley Field about the "called shot" (the ballpark also doubled as Yankee Stadium for the film). A scoreboard similar to the one existing in 1932 was used, atop an ivy wall (though that did not exist until later in the decade).

The ballpark was used for the establishing tryouts scene in A League of Their Own (1992). This film was a Hollywood account of the 1940s women's baseball league which Cubs owner P.K. Wrigley championed during World War II. Garry Marshall (older brother of the film's director Penny Marshall) has a cameo as "Walter Harvey", Wrigley's fictional alter ego. The sign behind the scoreboard was temporarily redone to read "Harvey Field", and filming was split between Wrigley and Cantigny Park near Wheaton, Illinois.

Many television series have made featured scenes set in Wrigley Field, including ER, Crime Story, Chicago Hope, Prison Break, Perfect Strangers, My Boys, Chicago Fire and Mike & Molly. Also, the animated comedy Family Guy featured a scene at Wrigley Field that parodied the Steve Bartman incident. In an episode of The Simpsons titled "He Loves to Fly and He D'ohs", upon arriving in Chicago, Homer walks past a number of Chicago landmarks, including Wrigley Field, followed by a generic-looking stadium bearing the name "Wherever the White Sox play". In 2007, the band Nine Inch Nails created a promotional audio skit, which involved Wrigley Field being the target of disgruntled war veteran's terrorist attack.

The late-1970s comedy stage play Bleacher Bums was set in the right field bleachers at Wrigley. The video of the play was also set on a stage, with bleachers suggesting Wrigley's layout, rather than in the actual ballpark's bleachers. The tradition of throwing opposition home run balls back was explained by Dennis Franz's character: "If someone hands you some garbage, you have to throw it back at them!"

In the cartoon series Biker Mice from Mars, the eponymous main characters hide out in the scoreboard of the stadium, which is named Quigley Field.

A dog park in the Wrightwood Neighbors section of Lincoln Park is named Wiggly Field (1997).

The stadium was also featured on the popular Travel Channel television show Great Hotels, starring Samantha Brown. She attended a game during a visit to Chicago.

Chicago folk singer Steve Goodman featured Wrigley Field as the setting for his popular Cubs lament "A Dying Cub Fan's Last Request", extolling both the trials of the Cubs and the place Wrigley Field holds in Cub fans' hearts. After his death from leukemia, Goodman's ashes were scattered at Wrigley Field as described in the lyrics.

The Statler Brothers' 1981 song "Don't Wait On Me" referred to a then-implausible situation: "When the lights go on at Wrigley Field". However, after lights were installed, the line was changed to "When they put a dome on Wrigley Field" for their 1989 Live-Sold Out album.

A few brief shots of Wrigley Field appear in the 1949 movie It Happens Every Spring. It is also seen on the History Channel's show Life After People.

The stadium made a brief appearance in the open for the first episode of The Tonight Show with Conan O'Brien, with Conan rushing through the turnstiles while running from New York (where his previous show, Late Night with Conan O'Brien, was taped) to Los Angeles (where his new show was taped, until his role as host ended on January 22, 2010) and then running onto the field while being chased by Cubs security. The route O'Brien takes is somewhat misleading, as he is shown running south on Michigan Avenue past the Tribune Tower before arriving at Wrigley Field, which is well north of the Tribune Tower.

In the movie Category 6: Day of Destruction, a terrorist turns off all the electricity at the stadium for a few minutes to demonstrate how hackers could penetrate city electrical systems.

In the video game Nicktoons MLB, Wrigley Field was one of the real-life ballparks.

An overgrown Wrigley Field is shown in the new television series Revolution (2012).

In episode 9 of season 3 of The Man in the High Castle (2015), Wrigley Field makes a short appearance as the home of a fictional soccer team called the Chicago Norsemen who, according to a banner, were "1963 Annual Soccer Champions".

Wrigley Field was the site of the final task of The Amazing Race 29 finale. One team member was guided by their partner in the press box via one way radio. They were told to place numbers on the hand-turned scoreboard corresponding to their team's final placement at the end of each of the previous eleven episodes, before searching the stadium's seats for their final clue.

On the Sonic Youth live album Smart Bar Chicago 85 the band introduces the final song, 'Making The Nature Scene', as being about 'Tripping on Acid at Wrigley Field'.

In the 2020 film, Greenland, Wrigley Field is shown still standing despite being severely damaged amidst the ruins of Chicago after the collision of an interstellar comet that collided with Earth.

Wesley Willis, an outsider musician and Chicago folk artist, had a track titled "Wrigley Field" on his album Greatest Hits Vol. 3, which he played with his band 'The Dragnews'.

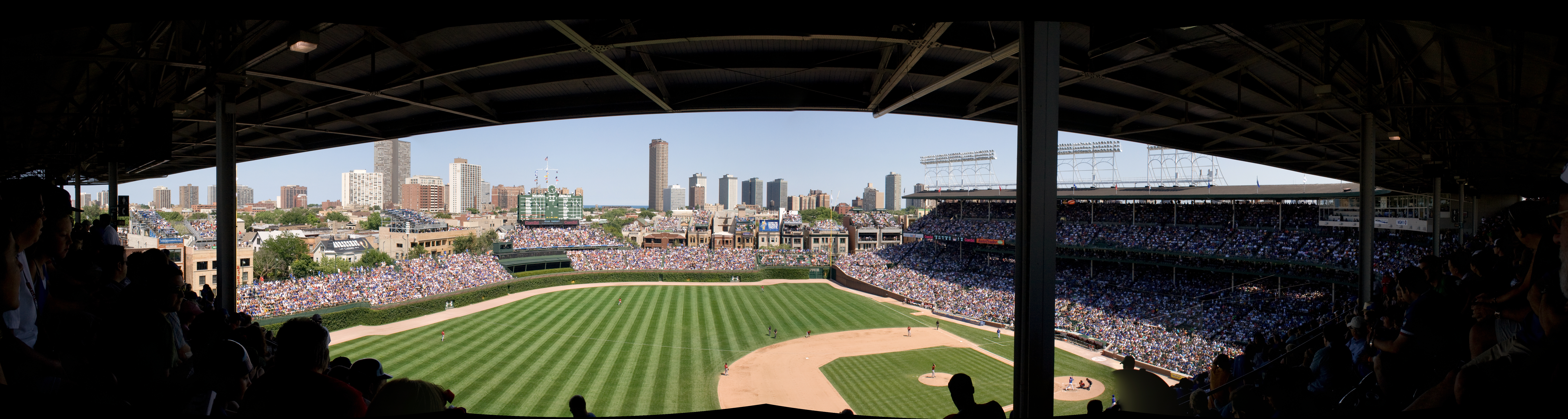
A panoramic view of Wrigley Field from the upper deck prior to 2015 outfield bleacher expansion.

== Accessibility and transportation ==
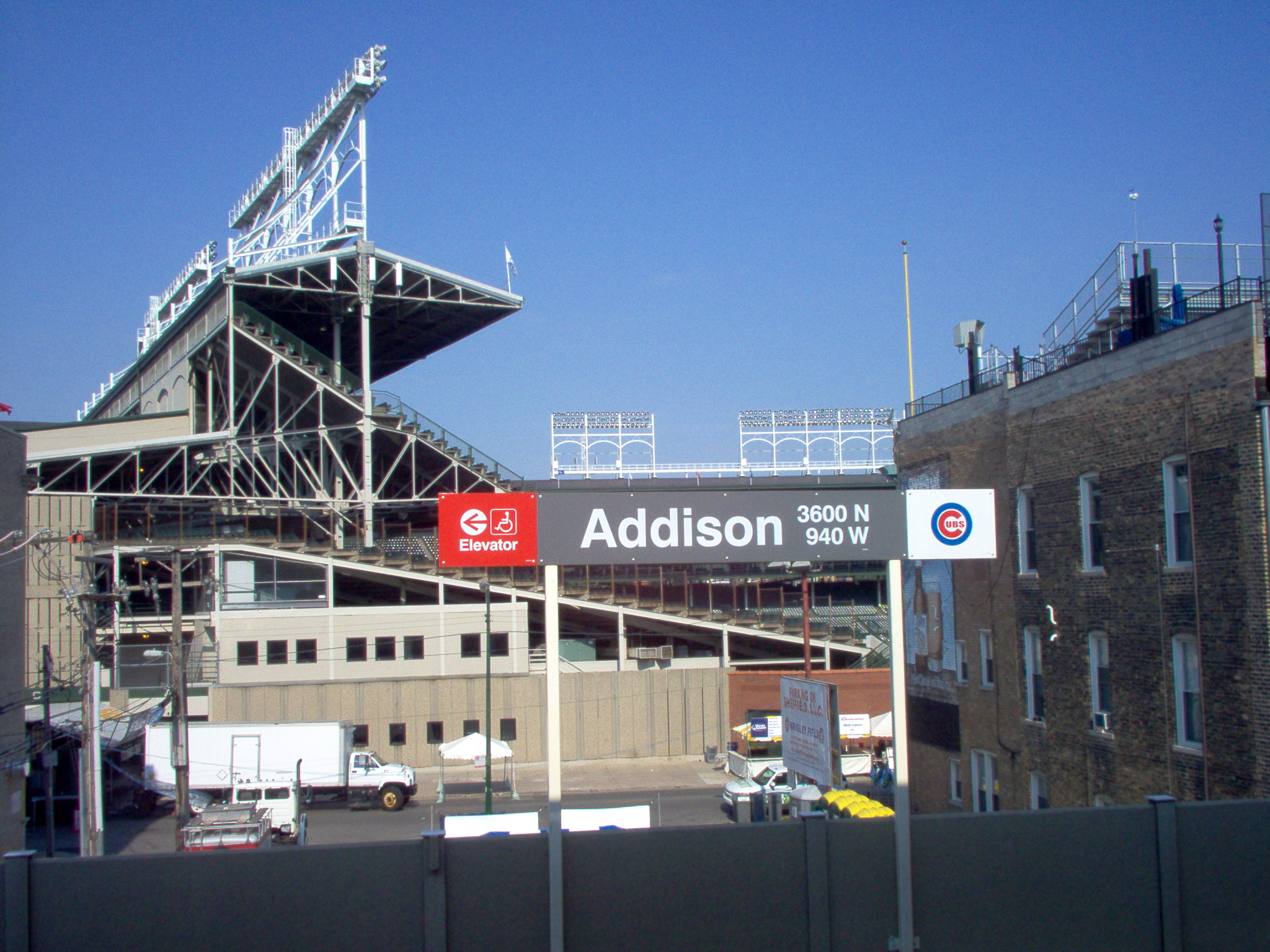
Addison at Wrigley Field is served by Red Line trains. This view is now blocked by buildings constructed in 2007.

The Chicago "L" Red Line stop at Addison is less than one block east of Wrigley Field; the stadium was originally built for proximity to the "L" tracks. As Addison is frequently crowded after games, many fans use Sheridan, the next station to the north, still less than a mile from the stadium.

Additionally, Purple Line Express trains stop at Sheridan before weekday night games in order to provide an additional connection for passengers traveling from Evanston, Skokie, Wilmette, and northern Chicago. After weekday night games, northbound Purple Line passengers are told to board at Sheridan, while southbound passengers are told to board at Addison.

At the conclusion of games, the scoreboard operator raises to the top of the center field scoreboard either a white flag with a blue "W" to signify a Cubs victory or a blue flag with a white "L" for a loss. This is done to show the outcome of the game to passengers on passing "L" trains, and also to anyone passing by the park. The basic flag color was once the exact opposite of the colors used today (the rationale being that white is the traditional color for surrender). In addition to rail service, the CTA provides two bus routes that serve Wrigley Field. CTA bus routes, 22 Clark and 152, Addison provide access to the ballpark. Biking to the field is also a popular alternative. As Halsted, Addison, and Clark streets all have designated biking lanes, getting to the field via bicycle is a widely used way to avoid hectic pre- and postgame traffic. Wrigley Field offers a complimentary bike check program to accommodate them; cyclists may check their bikes as much as 2 hours before games and 1 hour after games at racks off of Waveland Ave.

Parking in the area remains scarce, but that does not seem to bother fans who want to come to this baseball mecca, which drew over three million fans from 2004 until 2011, averaging a near-sellout every day of the season, even with many weekday afternoon games. The little parking that is available can go for as much as $100 per space. To partially alleviate this problem, the Cubs sponsor a parking shuttle service from the nearby DeVry University campus at Belmont and Western as part of their agreement with local neighborhood groups. This was not available during the World Series against the Detroit Tigers in 1945; cars parked as much as a mile away on residential streets and fans walked to Wrigley Field.

== Commemorative stamps ==
In 2001, a series of commemorative postage stamps on the subject of baseball parks was issued by the U.S. Postal Service. Most of them were engravings taken from old colorized postcards, including the illustration of Wrigley Field. In the case of Wrigley, the scoreboard was cut off to hide the original postcard's banner containing the park's name. The stamp and its sources also show the center field bleachers filled with spectators, a practice that was later discontinued due to the risk to batters, who might lose the flight of a pitch amidst the white shirts. This led to the development of darker backgrounds to the pitcher's mounds.

== See also ==
- History of Wrigley Field
- List of events at Wrigley Field

== Notes ==
Events and tenants
| Preceded by West Side Park (II) | Home of the Chicago Cubs; 1916–present | Succeeded by Current |
| Preceded by first stadium | Home of the Chicago Chi-Feds/Whales; 1914–1915 | Succeeded by last stadium |
| Preceded by Staley Field | Home of the Chicago Bears; 1921–1970 | Succeeded by Soldier Field |
| Preceded by first stadium | Home of the Chicago Tigers; 1920 | Succeeded by last stadium |
| Preceded by Comiskey Park | Home of the Chicago Cardinals; 1931-1939 | Succeeded by Comiskey Park |
| Preceded by Forbes Field; RFK Stadium; Anaheim Stadium | Host of the All-Star Game; 1946; 1962 (2nd Game); 1990 | Succeeded by Sportsman's Park; Cleveland Stadium; SkyDome |
| Preceded by Ralph Wilson Stadium; T-Mobile Park | Host of the NHL Winter Classic; 2009; 2025 | Succeeded by Fenway Park; LoanDepot Park |
