= Eamus Catuli =

Latin phrase associated with the Chicago Cubs

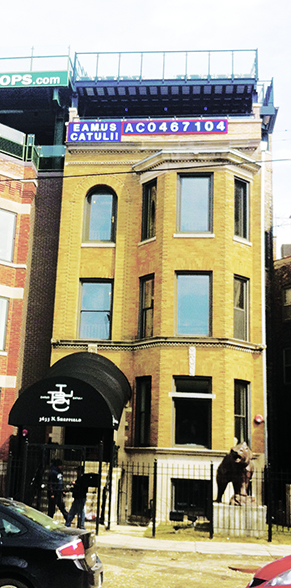
- The "Eamus Catuli!" sign and the "Anno Catulorum" sign on the Lakeview Baseball Club building in 2012
- Interactive map of Eamus Catuli
- Location: Lakeview Baseball Club; 3633 North Sheffield Avenue; Chicago, Illinois 60613
- Coordinates: 41°56′53.776″N 87°39′14.356″W
- Owner: Lakeview Baseball Club

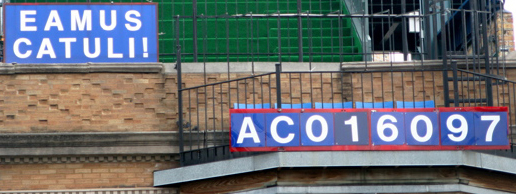
The signs in 2005

"Eamus Catuli" is a Latin phrase associated with the Chicago Cubs, a Major League Baseball team, and with the team's home ballpark, Wrigley Field. It has gained fame at both a local and national level. Featured on a sign that sits perched atop the Lakeview Baseball Club—the first of the rooftop establishments overlooking the ballpark—it has not only become something of a rallying cry amongst Cubs fans, but has also served to mark the team's historic futility. "Eamus Catuli" is a Latin translation for "Let's go Cubs".

== Features ==
The primary sign, with "Eamus Catuli!" posted in large, white capital letters on a blue background (the words stacked one over the other), is on the left side of the upper facade of the Lakeview Baseball Club building, 3633 N. Sheffield Avenue, just beyond the ballpark's right field bleachers. Not only can it be seen from the street, but it's also easily readable from various points within the ballpark. It is accompanied by another smaller sign to its right, reading "AC," followed by seven (originally six) numbers which change yearly. Originally this sign read AC075188 in white on a blue background. At the beginning of the 2016 season, it read AC0871108. After the Cubs won the 2016 World Series, it was reset to AC000000. As of 2025, the sign says AC050909.

== Meaning ==
The phrase "Eamus Catuli" is derived from Latin and loosely translates to "Let's go Cubs!"— the word "Eamus" meaning "Let's go," and "Catuli" technically meaning "whelps." Without a direct Latin equivalent for "Cubs," its originator settled on the word for "whelp," which is defined as "the young offspring of certain animals, such as dogs, wolves or bears." Thus, "Eamus Catuli" could be understood as "Let's go little bears!" i.e., "Let's go Cubs!"

The meaning of the secondary sign is more straightforward yet also a little more complex, particularly since some math is involved. The letters "AC" stand for "Anno Catulorum," which again is Latin-based, meaning "In the Year of the Cubs." The numbers which follow refer to three different date markers—counting the years since the team's seasonal and playoff success. The first two represent the number of seasons since the Cubs last won the National League Central division title (2020). The next two represent the number of seasons since the Cubs last won the National League pennant (2016). The last two (originally two, then three prior to 2016) represent the number of seasons since the Cubs last won the World Series (2016). Using this vernacular, AC000000 would indicate that the Cubs won the National League Central division, National League pennant, and World Series. That finally happened early in the morning on November 3, 2016, when the Cubs defeated the Cleveland Indians in Game 7 of the 2016 World Series.

== Origin ==
Both the "Eamus Catuli!" and "Anno Catulorum" signs were erected atop the Lakeview Baseball Club around Opening Day of the baseball season in April 1996. Visible from the stands in Wrigley Field, they were the brainchild of Bob Racky, owner of the building and managing director of the club at the time. They were meant to serve as a trivia contest for Cubs fans, with the winner receiving a one-year membership to the club. In addition, Racky also believed that it made the building, and its rooftop club, easily identifiable.

The contest to guess the meaning of the signs was more challenging than Racky anticipated. Though he offered monthly clues to contestants, it wasn't until the end of that year that someone correctly guessed the meaning of the "Eamus Catuli!" sign. Capturing the meaning of the "Anno Catulorum" sign, however, proved to be more difficult—even with continuing clues. In fact, it wasn't until September of the following year, 1997, that a caddy from the Glen Oak Country Club correctly guessed the meaning of both signs, winning the one-year membership, as well as a day for four at the club.

== History ==
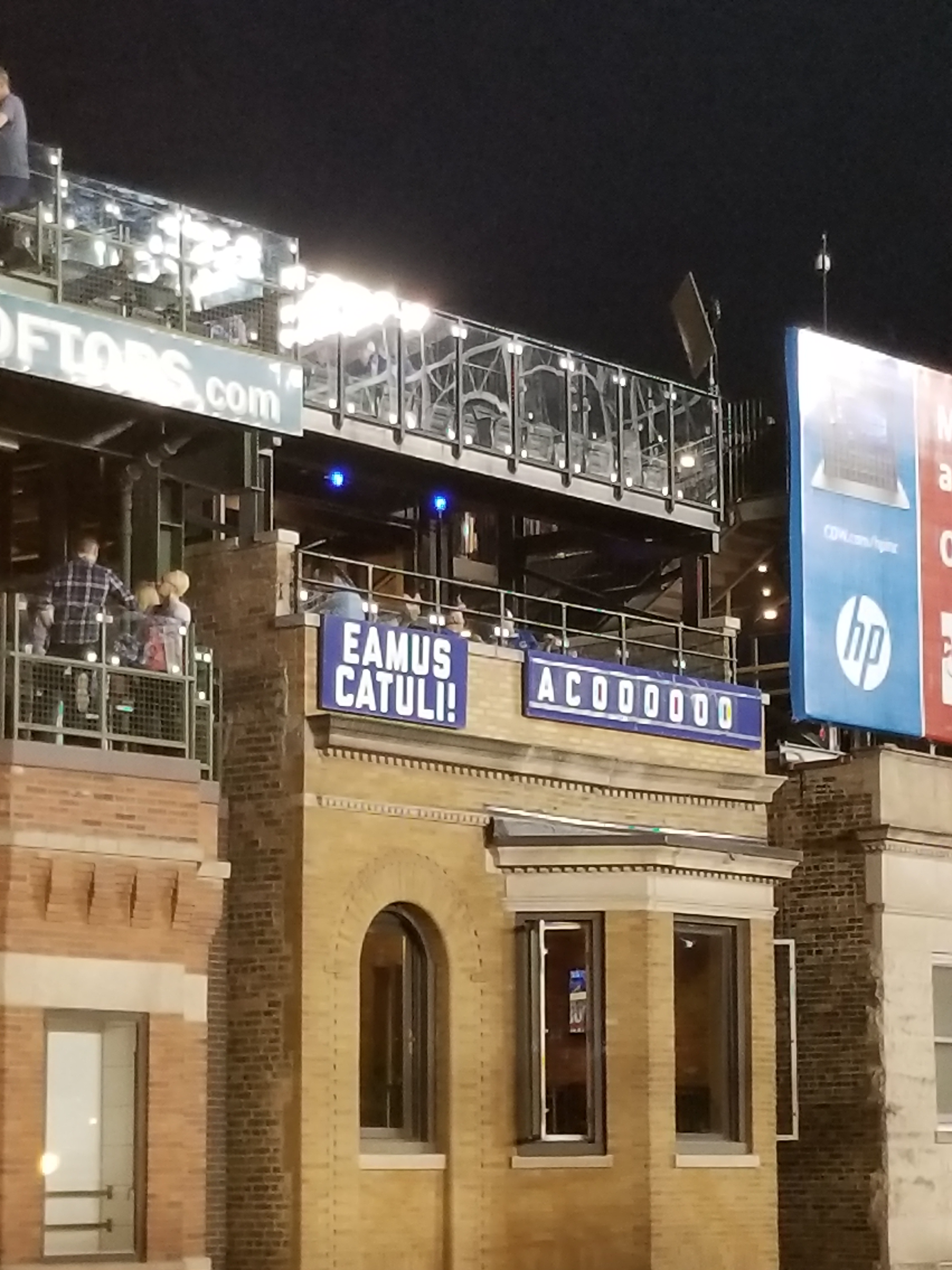
Sign at "AC0000000" during the 2017 Chicago Cubs season, in recognition of the Cubs victory in the 2016 World Series

Once the contest was over, the signs remained. With updates to the numbers of the “Anno Catulorum” sign with every passing season, the signs continued to generate press in both local and national news media outlets. Not only were they tracking the progress (or lack thereof) of the team, but they also came to be an identifiable part of Chicago Cubs and Wrigley Field lore, as well as a type of rallying cry for Cubs fans: "Eamus Catuli!"

In 2012, with the building and club under new management, both signs were removed temporarily for repairs. At the time, however, its owner also debated publicly whether to put the “Anno Catulorum” sign back up, since some felt it was a negative reminder of the team's record of futility. Eventually, though, both the "Eamus Catuli!" and "Anno Catulorum" signs returned.

== Significance ==
The phrase has been mentioned in numerous publications, such as The New York Times, New York Daily News, Boston Globe, USA Today, the Christian Science Monitor and Sports Illustrated—the "Eamus Catuli!" and "Anno Catulorum" signs have come to be equated with Chicago Cubs baseball and Wrigley Field. For Carlos Peña, Cubs first baseman for the 2011 season, the sign appeared to be a source of frustration when he called for a change in the team's losing ways mid-season. For others, such as rival catcher A. J. Pierzynski, it's served as an opportunity to gloat over the team's continually lackluster fortunes. In each case, it has served as a reminder of the team's seasons, and possibly culture, of losing.
