= List of awards and nominations received by Pearl Jam =

Pearl Jam awards and nominations
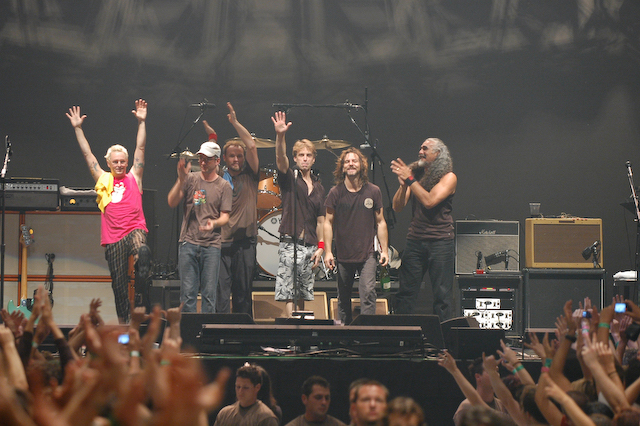
- Pearl Jam in concert, Vienna, Austria, in 2006
Awards and nominations
Award	Wins	Nominations
American Music Award	5	10
Brit Award	0	1
Broadcast Film Critics Association Awards	0	1
Esky Music Awards	1	1
Golden Globe Award	0	1
Grammy Award	2	18
Juno Awards	0	1
MTV Video Music Awards	4	7
MtvU Woodie Awards	0	1
Radio Music Awards	0	1
World Soundtrack Awards	0	1

Totals (Note: Certain award groups do not simply award one winner. They acknowledge several different recipients, have runners-up, and have third place. Since this is a specific recognition and is different from losing an award, runner-up mentions are considered wins in this award tally. For simplification and to avoid errors, each award in this list has been presumed to have had a prior nomination.)
- Wins: 14
- Nominations: 47

Pearl Jam is an American alternative rock band that formed in Seattle, Washington, in 1990. Since its inception, the band's line-up has included Eddie Vedder (lead vocals, guitar), Jeff Ament (bass guitar), Stone Gossard (rhythm guitar), and Mike McCready (lead guitar). The band's current drummer is Matt Cameron, formerly of Soundgarden, who has been with the band since 1998. Pearl Jam signed to Epic Records in 1991. Pearl Jam's debut studio album, Ten, broke the band into the mainstream. The single "Jeremy" received Grammy Award nominations for Best Rock Song and Best Hard Rock Performance in 1993. Pearl Jam received four awards at the 1993 MTV Video Music Awards for its music video for "Jeremy", including Video of the Year and Best Group Video. Ten was ranked number 207 on Rolling Stone magazine's list of the 500 greatest albums of all time, and "Jeremy" was ranked number 11 on VH1's list of the 100 greatest songs of the '90s.

The band's second studio album, Vs., released in 1993, was nominated for a Grammy Award for Best Rock Album in 1995. From Vs., the song "Daughter" received a Grammy nomination for Best Rock Performance by a Duo or Group with Vocal, and the song "Go" received a Grammy nomination for Best Hard Rock Performance. In 1994, the band released its third studio album, Vitalogy. The album received Grammy nominations for Album of the Year and Best Rock Album in 1996. Vitalogy was ranked number 492 on Rolling Stone magazine's list of the 500 greatest albums of all time. The lead single "Spin the Black Circle" won a Grammy Award in 1996 for Best Hard Rock Performance. Pearl Jam has subsequently released No Code in 1996, Yield in 1998, Binaural in 2000, Riot Act in 2002, the eponymous Pearl Jam in 2006, Backspacer in 2009, and Lightning Bolt in 2013. The songs "Do the Evolution" (from Yield) and "Grievance" (from Binaural) both received Grammy nominations for Best Hard Rock Performance. Pearl Jam's contribution to the 2003 film Big Fish, "Man of the Hour", was nominated for a Golden Globe Award in 2004. The band was placed at number 21 on VH1's list of the 100 greatest artists of hard rock.

== ARTISTdirect Online Music Awards ==
Year	Nominee / work	Award	Result	Ref.
1999	evenflow.simplenet.com	Best Rock Fansite	Nominated	
1999	Pearl Jam	Favorite Rock Group	Nominated	

== American Music Awards ==
The American Music Awards is an annual awards ceremony created by Dick Clark in 1973. Pearl Jam has received five awards from ten nominations.

Year	Nominee / work	Award	Result
1993	Pearl Jam	Favorite Pop/Rock New Artist	Won
1993	Pearl Jam	Favorite New Heavy Metal/Hard Rock Artist	Won
1994	Pearl Jam	Favorite Pop/Rock Band/Duo/Group	Nominated
1994	Pearl Jam	Favorite Heavy Metal/Hard Rock Artist	Nominated
1995	Pearl Jam	Favorite Heavy Metal/Hard Rock Artist	Nominated
1996	Pearl Jam	Favorite Alternative Artist	Won
1996	Pearl Jam	Favorite Heavy Metal/Hard Rock Artist	Won
1999	Pearl Jam	Favorite Alternative Artist	Won
2006	Pearl Jam	Favorite Alternative Artist	Nominated
2025	Pearl Jam	Favorite Rock Artist	Nominated

== Brit Awards ==
The Brit Awards are awarded annually by the British Phonographic Industry. Pearl Jam received one nomination for International Group.

== Broadcast Film Critics Association Awards ==
The Broadcast Film Critics Association Awards are awarded annually by the Broadcast Film Critics Association. Pearl Jam has received one nomination for Best Song.

== Clio Awards ==
Year	Nominee / work	Award	Result	Ref.
2026	Dark Matter World Tour - Auckland	Design - Gig Posters	Silver	
2026	Dark Matter World Tour - Gold Coast	Design - Gig Posters	Bronze	
2026	Dark Matter World Tour - Hollywood	Design - Gig Posters	Bronze	
2026	Dark Matter World Tour - New Orleans	Design - Gig Posters	Nominated	
2026	Dark Matter World Tour - Raleigh	Design - Gig Posters	Nominated	
2026	Dark Matter World Tour - Sydney	Design - Gig Posters	Nominated	

== Esky Music Awards ==
The Esky Music Awards are awarded annually in April by Esquire magazine. Pearl Jam has received one award for Best Live Act.

== European Festival Awards ==
Year	Nominee / work	Award	Result	Ref.
2011	Pearl Jam	Best Headliner	Nominated	

== GAFFA Awards ==
=== Denmark GAFFA Awards ===
Delivered since 1991, the GAFFA Awards are a Danish award that rewards popular music by the magazine of the same name. Pearl Jam has received two awards out of six nominations.

Year	Nominee / work	Award	Result	Ref.
1993	Pearl Jam	Most Underrated	Nominated	
1993	Pearl Jam	Band	Won	
1993	Vs.	Album of the Year	Won	
1994	Pearl Jam	Foreign Name	Nominated	
2000	Pearl Jam	Best Foreign Live Act	Nominated	

== Golden Globe Awards ==
The Golden Globe Awards are awarded annually by the Hollywood Foreign Press Association. Pearl Jam has received one nomination for Best Original Song.

== Grammy Awards ==
The Grammy Awards are awarded annually by the National Academy of Recording Arts and Sciences. Pearl Jam has received two awards from eighteen nominations.

Year	Nominee / work	Award	Result
1993	"Jeremy"	Best Rock Song	Nominated
1993	"Jeremy"	Best Hard Rock Performance	Nominated
1995	"Daughter"	Best Rock Performance by a Duo or Group with Vocal	Nominated
1995	"Go"	Best Hard Rock Performance	Nominated
1995	Vs.	Best Rock Album	Nominated
1996	"Spin the Black Circle"	Best Hard Rock Performance	Won
1996	Vitalogy	Album of the Year	Nominated
1996	Vitalogy	Best Rock Album	Nominated
1999	"Do the Evolution"	Best Hard Rock Performance	Nominated
1999	"Do the Evolution"	Best Music Video, Short Form	Nominated
1999	Yield	Best Recording Package	Nominated
2001	"Grievance"	Best Hard Rock Performance	Nominated
2010	"The Fixer"	Best Rock Song	Nominated
2011	Backspacer	Best Rock Album	Nominated
2015	Lightning Bolt	Best Recording Package	Won
2025	"Dark Matter"	Best Rock Performance	Nominated
2025	"Dark Matter"	Best Rock Song	Nominated
2025	Dark Matter	Best Rock Album	Nominated

== Hungarian Music Awards ==
Year	Nominee / work	Award	Result	Ref.
2014	Lightning Bolt	Foreign Hard Rock or Metal Album or Recording of the Year	Nominated	
2021	Gigaton	Foreign Hard Rock or Metal Album or Recording of the Year	Nominated	
2026	Dark Matter	Foreign Classic Pop-Rock Album or Recording of the Year	Nominated	

== Juno Awards ==
The Juno Awards are awarded annually by the Canadian Academy of Recording Arts and Sciences. Pearl Jam has received one nomination for Best Selling Album (Foreign or Domestic).

== MTV Video Music Awards ==
The MTV Video Music Awards are awarded annually by MTV. Pearl Jam has received four awards from seven nominations.

Year	Nominee / work	Award	Result
1992	"Alive"	Best Alternative Video	Nominated
1993	"Jeremy"	Video of the Year	Won
1993	"Jeremy"	Best Group Video	Won
1993	"Jeremy"	Best Metal/Hard Rock Video	Won
1993	"Jeremy"	Best Direction	Won
1993	"Jeremy"	Viewer's Choice	Nominated
2006	"Life Wasted"	Best Special Effects	Nominated

== mtvU Woodie Awards ==
The mtvU Woodie Awards are awarded annually. Pearl Jam has received one nomination for The Good Woodie.

== Pollstar Concert Industry Awards ==
Year	Nominee / work	Award	Result	Ref.
1993	Pearl Jam	Best New Rock Artist	Nominated	
1993	Ten Tour	Club Tour Of The Year	Won	

== Radio Music Awards ==
The Radio Music Awards were awarded annually. Pearl Jam has received one nomination for Artist of the Year/Alternative and Active Rock Radio.

== UK Festival Awards ==
Year	Nominee / work	Award	Result	Ref.
2006	Pearl Jam	Best Headline Act	Nominated	
2006	Pearl Jam	Festival Rock Act	Nominated	
2010	Calling Festival	Best Headline Performance	Nominated	

== World Soundtrack Awards ==
The World Soundtrack Awards are awarded annually by the World Soundtrack Academy. Pearl Jam has received one nomination for Best Original Song Written Directly for a Film, referring to "Man of the Hour" from Big Fish.

== Miscellaneous awards and honors ==
Year	Nominated work	Award/honor	Nominator
1993	"Alive"	The 100 Top Music Videos (#84)	Rolling Stone
1993	"Jeremy"	The 100 Top Music Videos (#36)	Rolling Stone
1994	Ten	Top 100 Albums of All Time (#25)	Nieuwe Revu
1998	Ten	100 Albums You Must Hear Before You Die (#15)	Kerrang!
1999	"Jeremy"	100 Greatest Videos Ever Made (#19)	MTV
1999	Ten	Top 90 Albums of the 90s (#33)	Spin
2000	"Jeremy"	The 100 Greatest Pop Songs Since the Beatles (#48)	Rolling Stone
2000	Pearl Jam	100 Greatest Artists of Hard Rock (#21)	VH1
2002	"Alive"	100 Greatest Singles of All Time (#51)	Kerrang!
2002	"Jeremy"	100 Greatest Singles of All Time (#85)	Kerrang!
2003	"Alive"	The 1001 Best Songs Ever (#497)	Q
2003	"Jeremy"	100 Best Songs of the Past 25 Years (#32)	VH1
2003	Ten	100 Greatest Albums Ever (#42)	Q
2003	Ten	100 Greatest Albums of Rock & Roll (#83)	VH1
2003	Ten	The 500 Greatest Albums of All Time (#207)	Rolling Stone
2003	Vitalogy	The 500 Greatest Albums of All Time (#492)	Rolling Stone
2004	"Alive"	666 Songs You Must Own (Grunge) (#3)	Kerrang!
2004	Ten	The 500 Best Albums of All Time (#20)	Rolling Stone (Germany)
2005	"Rearviewmirror"	The Ultimate Music Collection	Q
2005	Ten	100 Greatest Albums, 1985–2005 (#93)	Spin
2006	"Alive"	100 Hottest Guitar Solos (#26)	Total Guitar
2006	Pearl Jam	The Top 50 Albums of 2006 (#13)	Rolling Stone
2006	Ten	100 Greatest Albums Ever (#59)	Q
2006	Ten	100 Greatest Guitar Albums of All Time (#15)	Guitar World
2006	"World Wide Suicide"	The 100 Best Songs of 2006 (#11)	Rolling Stone
2006	"World Wide Suicide"	206 Best Songs to Download of 2006 (#54)	New York Post
2007	"Alive"	100 Greatest Guitar Solos (#44)	Guitar World
2007	"Yellow Ledbetter"	100 Greatest Guitar Solos (#95)	Guitar World
2007	"Jeremy"	100 Greatest Songs of the '90s (#11)	VH1
2007	Ten	Definitive 200 (#11)	National Association of Recording Merchandisers
2008	"Even Flow"	The 100 Greatest Guitar Songs of All Time (#77)	Rolling Stone
2008	"Even Flow"	100 Greatest Hard Rock Songs (#30)	VH1
2008	Pearl Jam	Hard Rock's All-Time Top 100 Live Bands (#74)	Hit Parader
2008	Vs.	100 Best Albums from 1983 to 2008 (#78)	Entertainment Weekly
2010	Pearl Jam	100 Greatest Artists of All Time (#93)	VH1
2011	Pearl Jam	Planet Defenders	Rock the Earth

Also, on 22 September 2011, a new species of insect was named Paramaka pearljam, to 'celebrate the 20th anniversary of Pearl Jam', by Mariano, R. (2011): A new species of Paramaka Savage & Domínguez, 1992 (Ephemeroptera: Leptophlebiidae: Atalophlebiinae) from Brazil. Zootaxa, 3038: 45–50. Preview
