= Mind Your Manners (Pearl Jam song) =

Pearl Jam song

Single by Pearl Jam

from the album Lightning Bolt
- Released: July 11, 2013
- Genre: Punk rock
- Length: 2:38
- Label: Monkeywrench
- Composer: Mike McCready
- Lyricist: Eddie Vedder
- Producer: Brendan O'Brien

Pearl Jam singles chronology
"Olé" (2011)	"Mind Your Manners" (2013)	"Sirens" (2013)

Music video
- "Mind Your Manners" on YouTube

"Mind Your Manners" is a song by the American rock band Pearl Jam. It was released on July 11, 2013 as a digital download as the lead single from their tenth studio album Lightning Bolt. Writing for The Globe and Mail, Brad Wheeler said the song was "lean, swift and punishing". Pearl Jam guitarist Mike McCready said "It's my attempt to try to make a really hard edge-type Dead Kennedys-sounding song". Singer Eddie Vedder's lyrics criticize organized religion, which Vedder considers hypocritical for their intolerance and "so many of the things which have come out of those organizations– like the abuse of children and then its cover-up."

The song was played live for the first time at their show in London, Ontario, Canada, on July 16, 2013. The video for the song directed by Danny Clinch was released on August 23, 2013. Bassist Jeff Ament brought fellow Missoula, Montana resident Andy Smetanka to do the animation for the video.

The song was used in the episode "Salvage" on the sixth season of television series Sons of Anarchy.

== Charts ==
=== Weekly charts ===
Weekly chart performance for "Mind Your Manners"
Chart (2013)	Peak position
Australia (ARIA)	54
Belgium (Ultratip Bubbling Under Flanders)	64
Canada Hot 100 (Billboard)	55
Canada Rock (Billboard)	1
Ireland (IRMA)	74
Netherlands (Single Top 100)	69
US Hot Rock & Alternative Songs (Billboard)	17
US Rock & Alternative Airplay (Billboard)	6

=== Year-end charts ===
Year-end chart performance for "Mind Your Manners"
Chart (2013)	Position
US Hot Rock Songs (Billboard)	92
US Rock Airplay (Billboard)	31

== Release history ==
Release dates and formats for "Mind Your Manners"
Country	Date	Format	Label
Worldwide	July 11, 2013	Digital download	Monkeywrench
