= Waiting for Stevie =

Single by Pearl Jam

from the album Dark Matter
- Released: September 10, 2024
- Length: 5:41
- Label: Monkeywrench; Republic
- Composers: Pearl Jam; Andrew Watt
- Lyricist: Eddie Vedder
- Producer: Watt

Pearl Jam singles chronology
"Wreckage" (2024)	"Waiting for Stevie" (2024)

Official visualizer
- "Waiting for Stevie" on YouTube

"Waiting for Stevie" is a song by the American rock band Pearl Jam, released as the fourth and final single from their 2024 album Dark Matter.

== Composition and lyrics ==
"Waiting for Stevie" is inspired by soul singer Stevie Wonder's "tardiness", as when Wonder was recording a harmonica part on "Try" for Eddie Vedder's solo album Earthling, he was scheduled to appear in the studio at 4pm, but he arrived at 11pm. Writing for Pitchfork, Zach Schonfield believed it was not actually about Stevie Wonder, but rather about self-doubt and depression. Kerrang! critic George Garner writes it "tells the story of a young woman finding refuge in live music over a bright, slinking guitar line".

== Release and reception ==
"Waiting for Stevie" was named Record Store Day's Song of the Year. It became a regular song on Pearl Jam's Dark Matter World Tour. Uproxx critic Steven Hyden concludes it does work as a "screamingly effective revival of this band’s strengths", highlighting the guitar riff, which he notes sounds like "Black" if play 25% faster than played on Ten. Pitchfork's Zach Schonfeld wrote that the song is "a meaty, anthemic rocker of the kind the band has largely shied away from this side of Y2K" while also noting that it had become "a favorite in the PJ fan community."

== Charts ==
=== Weekly charts ===
Weekly chart performance for "Waiting for Stevie"
Chart (2024)	Peak position
Canada Mainstream Rock (Billboard Canada)	24
US Rock & Alternative Airplay (Billboard)	12

=== Year-end charts ===
Year-end chart performance for "Waiting for Stevie"
Chart (2025)	Position
Canada Mainstream Rock (Billboard)	58
US Mainstream Rock (Billboard)	49
