= Dark Matter (Pearl Jam song) =

2024 song by Pearl Jam

Single by Pearl Jam

from the album Dark Matter
- Released: February 13, 2024
- Genre: Arena rock; grunge; hard rock
- Length: 3:31
- Label: Monkeywrench; Republic
- Songwriters: Eddie Vedder; Jeff Ament; Mike McCready; Stone Gossard; Matt Cameron; Andrew Watt
- Producer: Watt

Pearl Jam singles chronology
"Get It Back" (2020)	"Dark Matter" (2024)	"Running" (2024)

Audio sample
- file; help

"Dark Matter" is a song by American rock band Pearl Jam. It was released on February 13, 2024, as the lead single and title track from the band's twelfth studio album of the same name.

The song reached number one on Billboard's Mainstream Rock Airplay and Rock & Alternative Airplay charts. It was nominated for Best Rock Performance and Best Rock Song at the 2025 Grammy Awards.

== Background and release ==
According to Louder Than War, the song originated from a drum pattern improvised by Matt Cameron. Prior to its release, Pearl Jam teased the song on social media with a fan compilation video followed by a post displaying the message "Midnight ET". The band's label also shared a short preview of the track before it was released at midnight.

The song was released on February 13, 2024, alongside a visualizer video.

== Composition and lyrics ==
Andrew Sacher of BrooklynVegan and Lauryn Schaffner of Loudwire wrote that the song marked a return to Pearl Jam's raw, "'90s grungy hard rock" sound. Clash noted that the song opens with Matt Cameron's percussion before introducing distorted guitar and Eddie Vedder's vocals. Emma Johnston of Classic Rock described the song as featuring "pounding drums", "jabbing" guitar riffs and Vedder's "deep vocal delivery". The Arts Desk highlighted Cameron's drumming alongside a simple guitar riff from Stone Gossard and Mike McCready, while John Murphy of MusicOMH also praised the song's "powerful drumming" and "crunching" guitar riffs. Spill Magazine said that the song combines crunchy guitar riffs, belting vocals and thunderous drums. Lars Brandle of Billboard characterized it as "a muscular romp of power chords, in-your-face bass, drum fills and a late [guitar] solo". The Independent wrote that the song features a guitar solo from McCready supported by Gossard's forceful classic-rock rhythm guitar riffs, while Jonathan Cohen of Spin wrote that it is built around descending guitar riffs, a processed, stuttering guitar figure and a "screaming" guitar solo. XS Noize compared the solo to Pearl Jam's early 1990s work. Raul Stanciu of Sputnikmusic noted the song's stop-start rhythm, while Paste wrote that Vedder's vocals rumble menacingly before erupting into forceful outbursts, with Gossard's guitar lines driving the song's momentum.

Revolver and Loudwire noted that the lyrics appear to reference heavy metal singer King Diamond in the line "Denounce the demigods / King diamond to discard...", while Exclaim! wrote that the song pays homage to him. Consequence interpreted the lyrics as addressing people bearing the consequences of others' mistakes and viewed the song's themes as political. Classic Rock viewed the lyrics as criticizing the status quo, while Zach Schonfeld of Pitchfork considered that they appeared to criticize right-wingers and press suppression, although he found the message less provocative than earlier Pearl Jam material.

== Reception ==
=== Critical reception ===
Wren Graves of Consequence credited producer Andrew Watt with introducing a new element to Pearl Jam's sound, highlighting Matt Cameron's opening drums, Jeff Ament's baritone guitar and Watt's use of intense guitar reverb. Kerrang! described the track as conveying "indignant rage" and praised Cameron's drumming. Liberty Dunworth of NME felt that the song combined the energy of Pearl Jam's early work with the band's decades of experience, adding that it showcased Ament's and Mike McCready's "instrumental virtuosity".

Spin described the track as a "powerful opening blast". The review compared the song's rhythmic cadence to "I Love Rock 'n' Roll" and "Foxy Lady", and likened its processed guitar figure to Pearl Jam's "You Are". The magazine also described Eddie Vedder's vocals as "intense" and "age-defying", writing that the song sits sonically between Vs. and Binaural. In a separate review, Spin also highlighted the song's climax, describing the performances of Stone Gossard, McCready, Ament and Cameron as creating a "runaway train" with Vedder leading the performance. The Independent praised McCready's guitar solo, while MusicOMH described the track as "incendiary". Paste wrote that the song "rages with unbridled fury and passion", comparing it to Pearl Jam's "Animal". Kitty Empire of The Observer praised the track, describing it as a "pile-driving swirl" with a headphone "Doppler effect". Distorted Sound praised the guitar playing of Gossard and McCready, while Anne Erickson of Blabbermouth described the song as having a commercial sound with a catchy singalong chorus and a party-like atmosphere.

Other reviews were more mixed. Nicholas Sokic of Exclaim! considered the track an example of "traditionally beefy rock" but felt that it lacked lasting impact. Sputnikmusic praised Cameron's drumming but felt the instrumental could have achieved more, while Pitchfork described the track as a "grinding, metallic rocker" but considered it an uninspiring lead single.

=== Accolades ===
Nominations for "Dark Matter"
Award	Category	Result	Ref.
2025 Grammy Awards	Best Rock Performance	Nominated	
2025 Grammy Awards	Best Rock Song	Nominated	

== Track listing ==
"Dark Matter" single
No.	Title	Length
1.	"Dark Matter"	3:31

== Chart performance ==
"Dark Matter" became Pearl Jam's first number-one single on the Billboard Rock & Alternative Airplay chart dated March 2, 2024. It reached the top in its second week on the chart and ended the band's 14-year, eight-month and two-week wait between their first appearance on the chart and their first No. 1. It became their first top-ten hit on the Alternative Airplay chart since "Sirens" in 2013. The song also became their fourth Mainstream Rock Airplay No. 1 and first No. 1 since "Given to Fly" in 1998. It reached the top in four weeks on the chart dated March 16, 2024, tying "Given to Fly" as the band's fastest climb to the top of the chart. The 26-year-and-two-week gap between the band's Mainstream Rock Airplay No. 1 singles was the longest in the chart's history.

== Personnel ==
Credits adapted from Apple Music.

Pearl Jam

- Eddie Vedder – vocals, guitar, piano, songwriter
- Jeff Ament – bass, guitar, baritone guitar, songwriter
- Mike McCready – guitar, piano, songwriter
- Stone Gossard – guitar, songwriter
- Matt Cameron – drums, percussion, songwriter

Additional musicians

- Josh Klinghoffer – guitar, keyboards, piano
- Andrew Watt – guitar, keyboards, piano, songwriter, producer

Additional credits

- Serban Ghenea – mixing engineer
- Bryce Bordone – mixing engineer
- Matt Colton – mastering engineer
- Paul Lamalfa – recording engineer
- Marco Sonzini – recording engineer
- John Burton – additional engineer
- Gregg White – assistant recording engineer
- Tommy Turner – assistant recording engineer
- Mark Van Ghoul – guitar technician
- Neil Hundt – drum technician

== Charts ==
=== Weekly charts ===
Weekly chart performance for "Dark Matter"
Chart (2024)	Peak position
Australia Digital Tracks (ARIA)	31
Canada Rock (Billboard)	1
Germany Alternative (Deutsche Alternative Charts)	1
Italy Rock Airplay (FIMI)	28
Netherlands (Single Tip)	10
New Zealand Hot Singles (RMNZ)	21
UK Singles Sales (OCC)	36
UK Singles Downloads (Official Charts)	78
US Rock & Alternative Airplay (Billboard)	1
US Hot Rock & Alternative Songs (Billboard)	28
US Mainstream Rock Airplay (Billboard)	1

=== Year-end charts ===
Year-end chart performance for "Dark Matter"
Chart (2024)	Position
US Rock & Alternative Airplay (Billboard)	12
US Mainstream Rock Airplay (Billboard)	24
