= Pearl Jam 2015 Latin America Tour =

2015 concert tour by Pearl Jam

- Tour by Pearl Jam
- Location: Latin America
- Associated album: Lightning Bolt
- Start date: November 4, 2015
- End date: November 28, 2015
- No. of shows: 9

Pearl Jam concert chronology
- Lightning Bolt Tour (2013–14); 2015 Latin America Tour (2015); 2016 North America Tour (2016)

The Pearl Jam 2015 Latin America Tour was a concert tour by the American rock band Pearl Jam. The tour consisted of nine shows in Latin America, including venues in Chile, Brazil, Colombia, Mexico and Argentina. This was the first tour following the Lightning Bolt Tour that finished in 2014 and the first shows in Latin American since the band released their 2013 album Lightning Bolt. The tour started on November 4 in Santiago, Chile, and finished on November 28 in Mexico City. On August 6, it was announced that the show in Colombia will be moved from Estadio El Campín to Simón Bolívar Park.

The tour started in Santiago, with the band covering John Lennon's song "Imagine" during their set. Writing for Consequence of Sound, Alex Young called it "a truly surreal moment". At the show in Porto Alegre on November 11, the band covered Pink Floyd's song "Comfortably Numb" for the first time. At the show in São Paulo the band dedicated their song "Love Boat Captain" to the victims of the Paris attacks, which took place the previous day. They continued the tour by playing their first ever show in Bogotá, Colombia on November 25. The tour concluded with a show at the Foro Sol Stadium in Mexico City, in front of more than 60,000 people.

== Tour dates ==
List of 2015 concerts
Date	City	Country	Venue
November 4, 2015	Santiago	Chile	Estadio Nacional
November 7, 2015	La Plata	Argentina	Estadio Ciudad de La Plata
November 11, 2015	Porto Alegre	Brazil	Arena do Grêmio
November 14, 2015	São Paulo	Brazil	Estádio do Morumbi
November 17, 2015	Brasília	Brazil	Estádio Nacional Mané Garrincha
November 20, 2015	Belo Horizonte	Brazil	Estadio Mineirão
November 22, 2015	Rio de Janeiro	Brazil	Maracanã Stadium
November 25, 2015	Bogotá	Colombia	Simón Bolívar Park
November 28, 2015	Mexico City	Mexico	Foro Sol Stadium

== Band members ==
Pearl Jam

- Jeff Ament – bass guitar
- Stone Gossard – rhythm guitar
- Mike McCready – lead guitar
- Eddie Vedder – lead vocals, guitar
- Matt Cameron – drums

Additional musicians

- Boom Gaspar – Hammond B3 and keyboards
