= Wreckage (Pearl Jam song) =

Single by Pearl Jam

from the album Dark Matter
- Released: April 17, 2024
- Studio: Shangri-La, Malibu, California
- Genre: Heartland rock
- Length: 5:00
- Label: Monkeywrench; Republic
- Composers: Pearl Jam; Andrew Watt
- Lyricist: Eddie Vedder
- Producer: Andrew Watt

Pearl Jam singles chronology
"Running" (2024)	"Wreckage" (2024)	"Waiting for Stevie" (2024)

"Wreckage" is a song by American rock band Pearl Jam. It was released on April 17, 2024, as the third single from their twelfth studio album, Dark Matter.

Described as heartland rock, the song reached number one on Billboard's Mainstream Rock and Adult Alternative Airplay charts.

== Background ==
The song was written at Rick Rubin's Shangri-La recording studio in California. Lead singer Eddie Vedder and producer Andrew Watt led the creation of the song. Guitarist Stone Gossard said, "Andrew encouraged me to play this little harmonic, acoustic part almost like a Cure melody."

Spin compared the song's sound to that of Tom Petty, while Rolling Stone likened Vedder's vocal performance to Bruce Springsteen.

== Lyrics and meaning ==
Eddie Vedder wrote the lyrics to "Wreckage" about the "desperation" of former United States president Donald Trump. In an interview with The Sunday Times, Vedder said: "There is a guy in the United States who is still saying he didn't lose an election, and people are reverberating and amplifying that message as if it is true. Trump is desperate. I don't think there has ever been a candidate more desperate to win, just to keep himself out of prison and to avoid bankruptcy. It is all on the line, and he's out there playing the victim... So the song is saying, let's not be driven apart by one person, especially not a person without any worthy causes."

During an April 22 performance on The Howard Stern Show, Vedder said that the song could also be about "a difficult relationship".

== Reception ==
"Wreckage" reached number one on Billboard's Mainstream Rock and Adult Alternative Airplay charts. On the former, it was the band's fifth number-one song and the first time that Pearl Jam recorded back-to-back number-one singles (following the album's title track). On the latter, it became the band's third number-one song and their first since "Sirens" in 2013.

== Music video ==
On August 12, 2024, Pearl Jam released a music video for "Wreckage". It features a live performance of the song filmed during the band's May 16, 2024, concert at Las Vegas' MGM Grand Garden Arena. The video highlights the band's tour visuals which were designed by Rob Sheridan.

== Charts ==
=== Weekly charts ===
Weekly chart performance for "Wreckage"
Chart (2024)	Peak position
Canada Mainstream Rock (Billboard Canada)	1
US Hot Rock & Alternative Songs (Billboard)	28
US Rock & Alternative Airplay (Billboard)	2

=== Year-end charts ===
Year-end chart performance for "Wreckage"
Chart (2024)	Position
US Rock Airplay (Billboard)	11

Year-end chart performance for "Wreckage"
Chart (2025)	Position
Canada Mainstream Rock (Billboard)	33
Canada Modern Rock (Billboard)	86
