= Dark Matter (Pearl Jam album) =

Studio album by Pearl Jam
- Released: April 19, 2024
- Recorded: 2021; 2023
- Studio: Shangri-La, Malibu, California
- Genre: Alternative rock; hard rock
- Length: 48:21
- Label: Monkeywrench; Republic
- Producer: Andrew Watt

Pearl Jam chronology
Give Way (2023)	Dark Matter (2024)	The Last of Us (2025)

Singles from Dark Matter
- 1. "Dark Matter" Released: February 13, 2024; 2. "Running" Released: March 22, 2024; 3. "Wreckage" Released: April 17, 2024; 4. "Waiting for Stevie" Released: September 10, 2024

Dark Matter is the twelfth studio album by American rock band Pearl Jam, released on April 19, 2024, through Monkeywrench Records and Republic Records. Produced by Andrew Watt, the album was preceded by the singles "Dark Matter", "Running" and "Wreckage".

Recorded at Shangri-La in Malibu, California and Watt's home studio, the album is the first to feature contributions from touring and session member Josh Klinghoffer, who joined the band on its 2022–2023 Gigaton Tour, as well as the last to feature longtime drummer Matt Cameron, who announced his departure from the band in July 2025. The album marked a return to the band working together as a five-piece in a fast-paced studio environment, in contrast to their previous studio album, Gigaton (2020), which was recorded over several years and individual sessions.

The album was released to widespread critical acclaim, and was accompanied by the Dark Matter World Tour. The album received Grammy nominations for Best Rock Album, Best Rock Song ("Dark Matter"), and Best Rock Performance ("Dark Matter").

== Background and recording ==
After successfully working together on frontman Eddie Vedder's 2022 studio album, Earthling, record producer Andrew Watt was enlisted to produce Pearl Jam's twelfth studio album. The band's first recording sessions for Dark Matter took place in February 2021 at Watt's home studio, which yielded the first two tracks, "Scared of Fear" and "React, Respond".

The majority of Dark Matter was recorded over three weeks in 2023 at Shangri-La in Malibu, California and, according to a press release, "channels the shared spirit of a group of lifelong creative confidants and brothers in one room playing as if their very lives depended on it". On November 29, 2023, drummer Matt Cameron revealed that they finished a record with assistance from Andrew Watt and that it was "mastered, mixed, ready to go" at the time. On January 5, 2024, guitarist Mike McCready described the album as "a lot heavier" than one might expect, saying that recording was less time-consuming than for their previous record Gigaton, mostly thanks to the involvement from Watt, who was said to have "kicked [their] asses". Later that month, on January 31, the band and Watt debuted Dark Matter in front of a group of fans at the Troubadour in West Hollywood, California, without revealing lyrics or song titles. During the event, Eddie Vedder opined that this is their best work to date and how he could not be prouder of the band.

The album's packaging features light painting art by Alexandr Gnezdilov. The album cover art was crafted using a large self-made kaleidoscope. Each letter visible on the cover was individually captured and handwritten midair with a specially designed flashlight to create the pearlescent effect.

On February 13, Pearl Jam announced the album alongside the release of the title track as a lead single. The single was Consequence of Sound's song of the week.

== Critical reception ==
Professional ratings
Aggregate scores
Source	Rating
AnyDecentMusic?	7.7/10
Metacritic	81/100
Review scores
Source	Rating
AllMusic	4/5 stars
Classic Rock	4/5 stars
The Independent	9/10
Kerrang!	5/5
Mojo	4/5 stars
NME	4/5 stars
Pitchfork	6.4/10
Rolling Stone	4/5 stars
Spin	A−
Uncut	8/10

According to the review aggregator Metacritic, Dark Matter received "universal acclaim" based on a weighted average score of 81 out of 100 from 17 critic scores. Ultimate Classic Rock said "With cutting lyrics and slicing riffs, Eddie Vedder and the band delivered their most satisfying album since the '90s." Uncut called it "a fretful and ferocious record, lyrically much preoccupied with things having ended or appearing about to end, but musically much more blaze of glory than any kind of funeral pyre".

Pitchfork's Zach Shonfeld offered measured praise of the album, stating that "Dark Matter plays like another solid late-era Pearl Jam record, reliable but not revelatory" and highlighted "Wreckage" and "Upper Hand", the latter of which he said "ranks among the best Pearl Jam songs this century". Shonfeld described "Waiting for Stevie" (which Vedder said in a Howard Stern interview had originated when he and Watt were idly waiting for Stevie Wonder to show up and record a harmonica part for Vedder's solo album Earthling) as a "meaty, anthemic rocker of the kind the band has largely shied away from this side of Y2K" that had "already become a favorite in the PJ fan community".

Loudwire ranked it as the 9th best rock album of 2024.

== Commercial performance ==
On the US Billboard 200, Dark Matter debuted at number five with 59,000 album-equivalent units, marking the band's thirteenth top 10 album. Of that sum, it sold 52,000 physical units, including 24,000 vinyl copies, helped by its availability in twelve different vinyl color variants. As of August 2024, the album has earned over 107,000 equivalent album units in the United States. The singles "Dark Matter" and "Wreckage" have also enjoyed success, both topping the Mainstream Rock Airplay, the band's first number ones since 1997's "Given to Fly" and marking the first time ever the band has had two number one songs on the chart from the same album.

== Dark Matter World Tour ==
On February 13, 2024, Pearl Jam announced they would embark on a 2024 world tour in promotion of Dark Matter, titled Dark Matter World Tour. On April 16, 2024, Pearl Jam made a promotional visualization "experience" in select movie theaters featuring the album being played in the dark with the album being played again in a visualization sequence, for one night only.

The Dark Matter World Tour unfolds over four legs.

== Track listing ==
All lyrics are written by Eddie Vedder; all music is composed by Pearl Jam and Andrew Watt, except "Something Special" by Pearl Jam, Watt and Josh Klinghoffer.

Dark Matter track listing
No.	Title	Length
1.	"Scared of Fear"	4:25
2.	"React, Respond"	3:30
3.	"Wreckage"	5:00
4.	"Dark Matter"	3:31
5.	"Won't Tell"	3:28
6.	"Upper Hand"	5:57
7.	"Waiting for Stevie"	5:41
8.	"Running"	2:19
9.	"Something Special"	4:06
10.	"Got to Give"	4:37
11.	"Setting Sun"	5:45
Total length:		48:21

== Personnel ==
Pearl Jam

- Eddie Vedder – lead vocals, guitar, piano, backing vocals
- Mike McCready – guitar, piano
- Stone Gossard – guitar
- Jeff Ament – bass guitar, guitar, baritone guitar, backing vocals on "Running"
- Matt Cameron – drums, percussion

Additional musicians

- Andrew Watt – guitar, piano, keyboards, backing vocals on "Running"
- Josh Klinghoffer – piano, keyboards, guitar
- Mark Smith – backing vocals on "Running"
- Sean Penn – pool cue on "Scared of Fear"

Production

- Andrew Watt – producer
- Paul LaMalfa – engineering
- Marco Sonzini – engineering
- John Burton – additional engineering
- Gregg White – engineering assistance
- Tommy Turner – engineering assistance
- Serban Ghenea – mixing
- Bryce Bordone – mix engineering, mixing assistance
- Matt Colton – mastering
- Marc VanGool – guitar technician, studio assistance

== Charts ==
=== Weekly charts ===
Weekly chart performance for Dark Matter
Chart (2024)	Peak position
Australian Albums (ARIA)	2
Austrian Albums (Ö3 Austria)	2
Belgian Albums (Ultratop Flanders)	2
Belgian Albums (Ultratop Wallonia)	3
Canadian Albums (Billboard)	9
Croatian International Albums (HDU)	2
Danish Albums (Hitlisten)	17
Dutch Albums (Album Top 100)	2
Finnish Albums (Suomen virallinen lista)	13
French Albums (SNEP)	13
German Albums (Offizielle Top 100)	2
Greek Albums (IFPI)	24
Hungarian Physical Albums (MAHASZ)	16
Icelandic Albums (Tónlistinn)	7
Irish Albums (Official Charts)	2
Italian Albums (FIMI)	3
Japanese Albums (Oricon)	29
Japanese Digital Albums (Oricon)	25
Japanese Hot Albums (Billboard Japan)	27
New Zealand Albums (RMNZ)	3
Polish Albums (ZPAV)	4
Portuguese Albums (AFP)	2
Scottish Albums (Official Charts)	2
Spanish Albums (Promusicae)	3
Swedish Albums (Sverigetopplistan)	21
Swiss Albums (Schweizer Hitparade)	2
UK Albums (Official Charts)	2
UK Rock & Metal Albums (Official Charts)	1
US Billboard 200	5
US Top Rock & Alternative Albums (Billboard)	1

=== Year-end charts ===
Year-end chart performance for Dark Matter
Chart (2024)	Position
Belgian Albums (Ultratop Flanders)	189
Croatian International Albums (HDU)	38
Swiss Albums (Schweizer Hitparade)	96
