= Lightning Bolt Tour =

2013–14 concert tour by Pearl Jam

- Tour by Pearl Jam
- Location: North America; Oceania; Europe
- Associated album: Lightning Bolt
- Start date: October 11, 2013
- End date: October 26, 2014
- Legs: 6
- No. of shows: 39 in North America; 6 in Oceania; 12 in Europe; 57 in total

Pearl Jam concert chronology
- Pearl Jam 2012 Tour (2012); Lightning Bolt Tour (2013–14); Pearl Jam 2015 Latin America Tour (2015)

The Lightning Bolt Tour was a concert tour by the American rock band Pearl Jam to support its tenth studio album, Lightning Bolt (2013). The tour started with two legs in North America, the first on the East Coast in October 2013, followed by a second leg on the West Coast the following month before finishing in their hometown of Seattle in December. Rolling Stone listed the tour as one of the 19 hottest tours to see in the fall of 2013.

Prior to these shows, the band played two shows in July, one in London, Ontario and the other at Wrigley Field, Chicago. The Chicago show became the fastest concert to sell-out at Wrigley Field. On July 3, 2013, guitarist Stone Gossard said that the Wrigley Field show would be "a special experience". The Wrigley show was interrupted for more than two hours due to the threat of lightning. The band returned onstage around midnight to continue their set, which included two new songs from their tenth studio album Lightning Bolt, before finishing at 2 am.

On July 31, 2013, the press announced that the band would play the Big Day Out festival in New Zealand and Australia in January 2014. Following these shows, frontman Eddie Vedder played solo dates in Australia in February.

On December 13, 2013, the band announced an eleven-date European leg starting on June 16 at the Ziggo Dome in Amsterdam and finishing on July 11 at the Milton Keynes Bowl, England. On the next day a second date was added at the Ziggo Dome. On April 22, 2014, Pearl Jam's website announced that the band would play one night of each weekend of the Austin City Limits Music Festival in October. One month later, the band added another ten shows in the American Midwest, also scheduled for October.

After the shows in the Midwest, the band played at the annual Bridge School Benefit in Mountain View, California. The twenty 2014 shows grossed US$18.7 million and were attended by more than 264,000 people.

== History ==
The first American leg started in Pittsburgh at the Consol Energy Center on October 11, 2013, the band's first show in the city since 2006. The Pittsburgh Post-Gazette said that the show was "an amazing, exhausting, uplifting opening night". They later listed the show as the best concert of 2013 in their review of the year. Writing for PopMatters, Sachyn Mital at the first of two Brooklyn shows said "Pearl Jam performed with vibrant, youthful energy working through a lot of heavy hitters". Across the two shows in Brooklyn, the band played 66 songs, repeating only 10 of these. On October 27, the band played in Baltimore for the first time in their career, and dedicated their song "Man of the Hour" to Lou Reed who had died earlier that day, before covering The Velvet Underground's "I'm Waiting for the Man". On November 1, the band headlined the Voodoo Music + Arts Experience in New Orleans. Former football player, Steve Gleason, introduced the band and created the setlist.

On November 15, 2013, as the second leg started, drummer Matt Cameron announced that he would not be touring with Soundgarden in 2014, due to prior commitments promoting Lightning Bolt. Later that day, the band played in Dallas. The Dallas Morning News said that "at two-and-half-hours, the concert dragged at times. But it was seldom predictable, with obscure songs intertwined with the singalong hits "Better Man" and "Alive"." Sleater-Kinney reformed for a single song during the show in Portland on November 29: they joined Pearl Jam onstage for the band's final song, a cover of Neil Young's "Rockin' in the Free World." The West Coast leg finished in the band's hometown of Seattle, with a set that included a cover of MC5's "Kick Out the Jams", which featured Steve Turner and Mark Arm of Mudhoney and Kim Thayil of Soundgarden.

In January 2014, the band played on the Big Day Out festival around New Zealand and Australia. Lucy Slight of MTV News said their Gold Coast show was "nothing but pure rock from start to finish". After the show in Melbourne, Paul Cashmere writing for Noise11 said that "The Stones may be the greatest rock and roll band in the world for their generation. Pearl Jam may well be the greatest rock and roll band in the world for the kids of the Stones generation." The band finished the Big Day Out shows in Perth and concluded their set with a cover of "Rockin' in the Free World", which featured Win Butler of Arcade Fire on vocals.

On June 16, 2014, the band started the European leg of the tour, playing at the Ziggo Dome in Amsterdam. In Milan, Pearl Jam played a portion of the Disney song "Let It Go" tagged onto the end of their own song "Daughter". At the Telenor Arena in Oslo, the band played the song "Strangest Tribe" live for the first time.

On October 1, 2014, Pearl Jam started the American Midwest leg in Cincinnati at the U.S. Bank Arena, playing for more than three hours. On October 5, the band made their first of two appearances at the Austin City Limits Music Festival. On October 9, what would have been John Lennon's 74th birthday, frontman Eddie Vedder covered "You've Got to Hide Your Love Away" and "Imagine" at the Pinnacle Bank Arena in Lincoln, Nebraska.

On October 17 at the iWireless Center in Moline, Illinois, Pearl Jam played the whole of their fourth album, "No Code", in order as part of their set. Three nights later at the BMO Harris Bradley Center in Milwaukee, the band played the whole of their fifth album "Yield". Bassist Jeff Ament would later admit that he was not a fan of playing full albums in order, but it created "a good tension".

At the Bridge School Benefit on October 25, Pearl Jam were joined onstage with Soundgarden frontman Chris Cornell and played the Temple of the Dog song "Hunger Strike".

== Opening acts ==
Midlake opened in Dallas and Oklahoma City and Mudhoney opened for all the shows from Portland to Seattle. For the other North American shows, there was no support. On the European leg Black Rebel Motorcycle Club played the show at the Milton Keynes Bowl with American hardcore band Off! opening.

== Tour dates ==
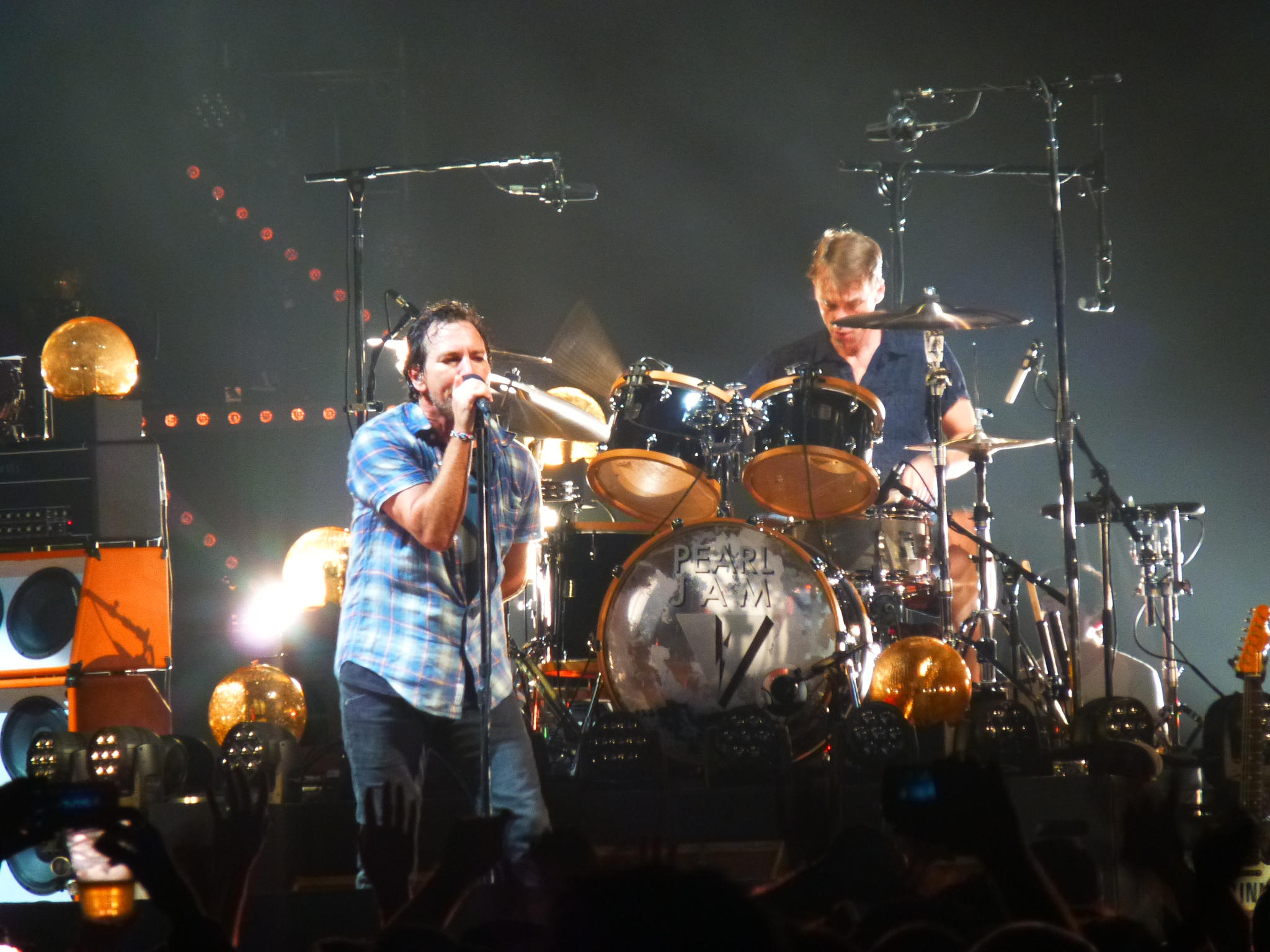
Pearl Jam at the Barclays Center, Brooklyn, on October 18, 2013

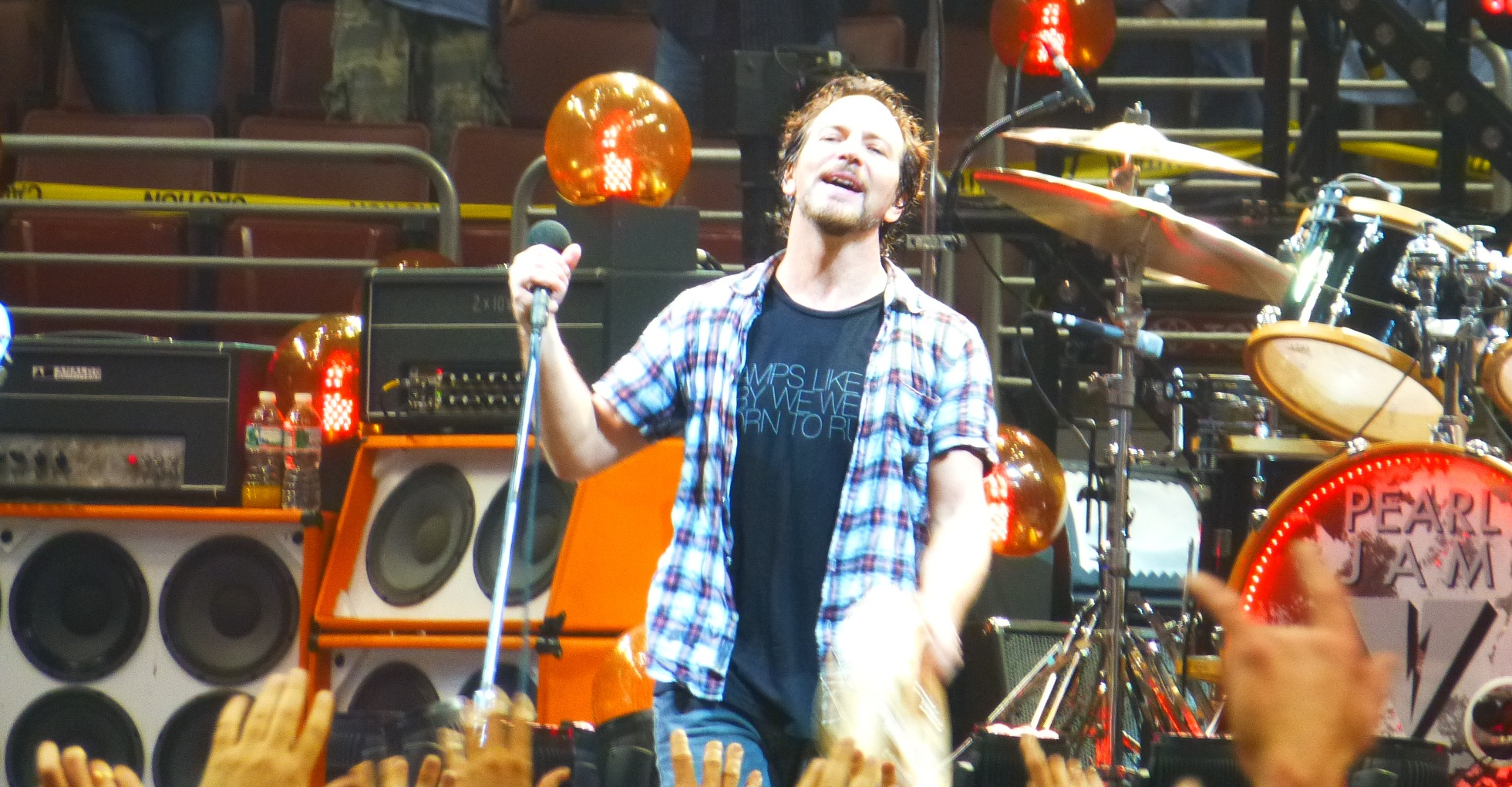
Eddie Vedder of Pearl Jam at the Wells Fargo Center, Philadelphia, on October 22, 2013

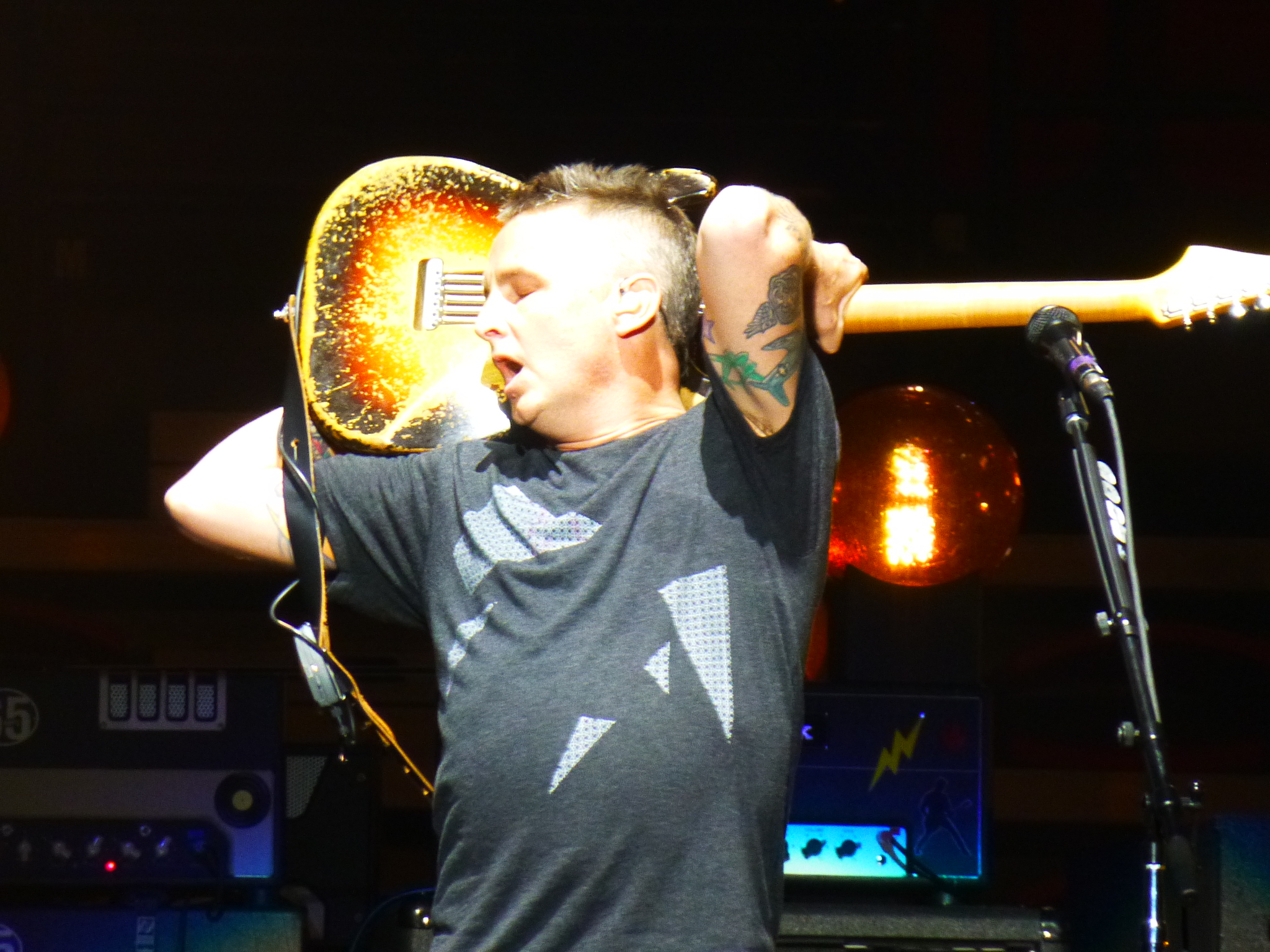
Mike McCready of Pearl Jam at Viejas Arena, San Diego, November 21, 2013

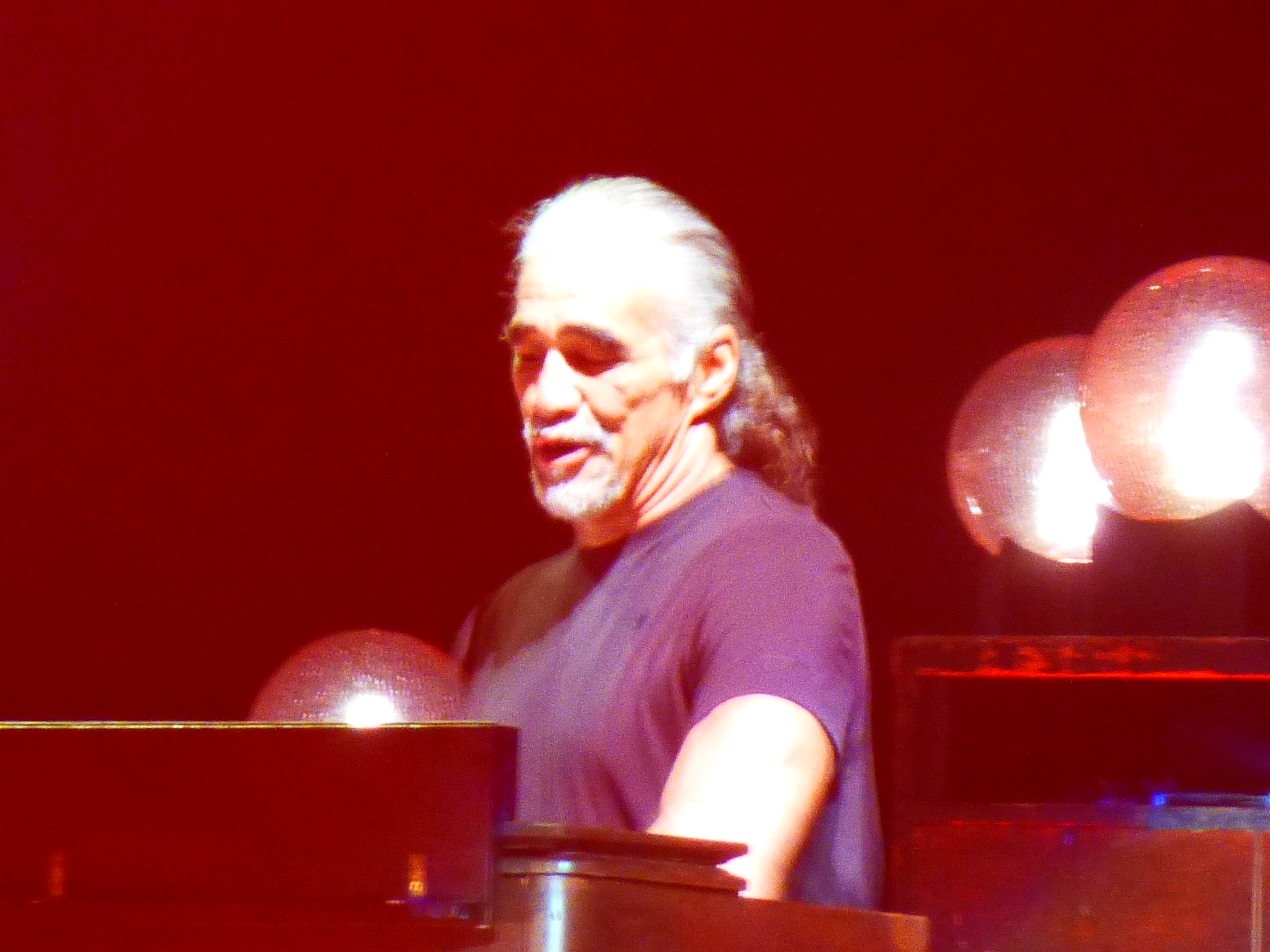
Boom Gasper of Pearl Jam at the Oracle Arena, Oakland on November 26, 2013

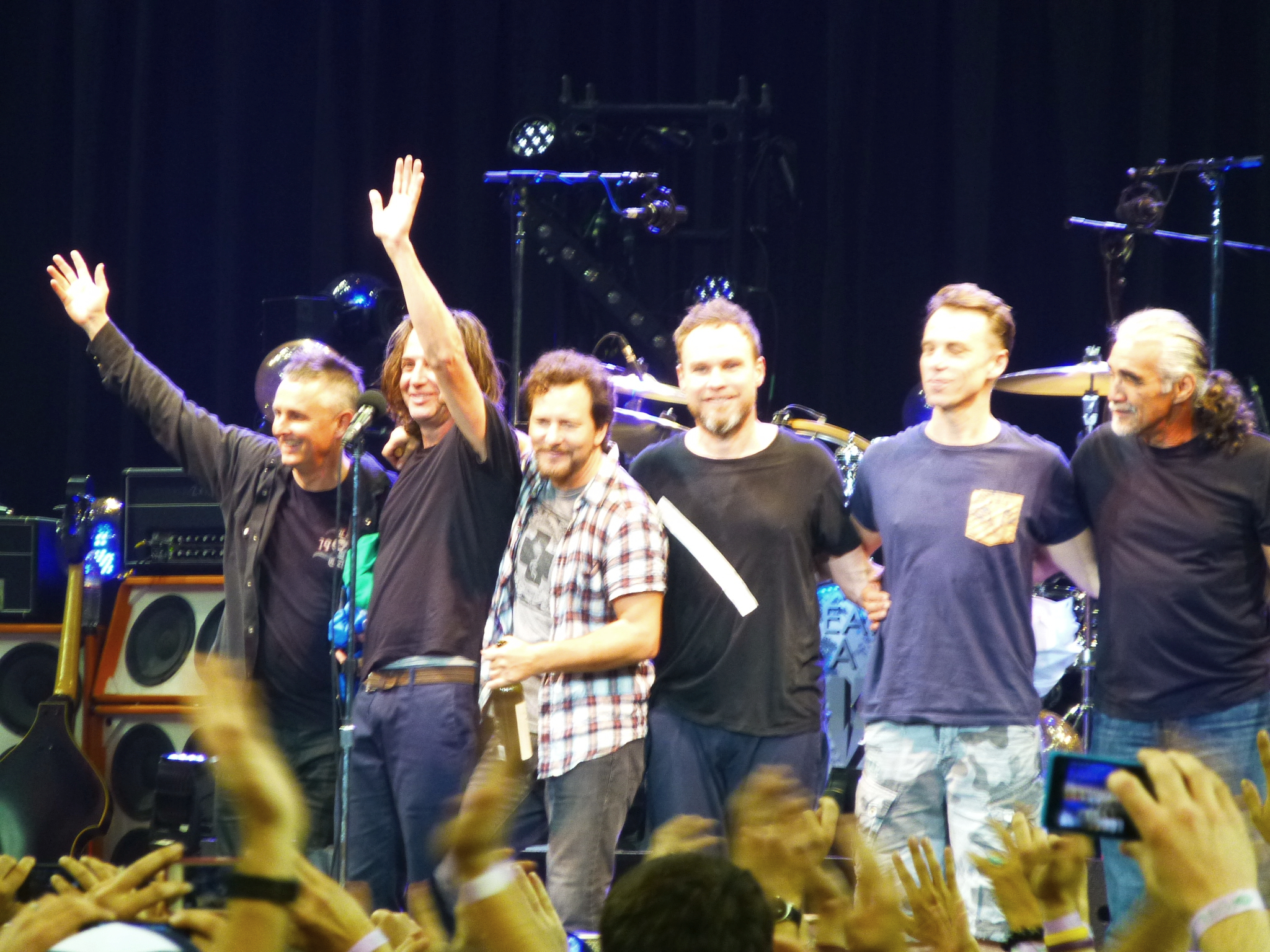
Pearl Jam onstage in Oakland on November 26, 2013

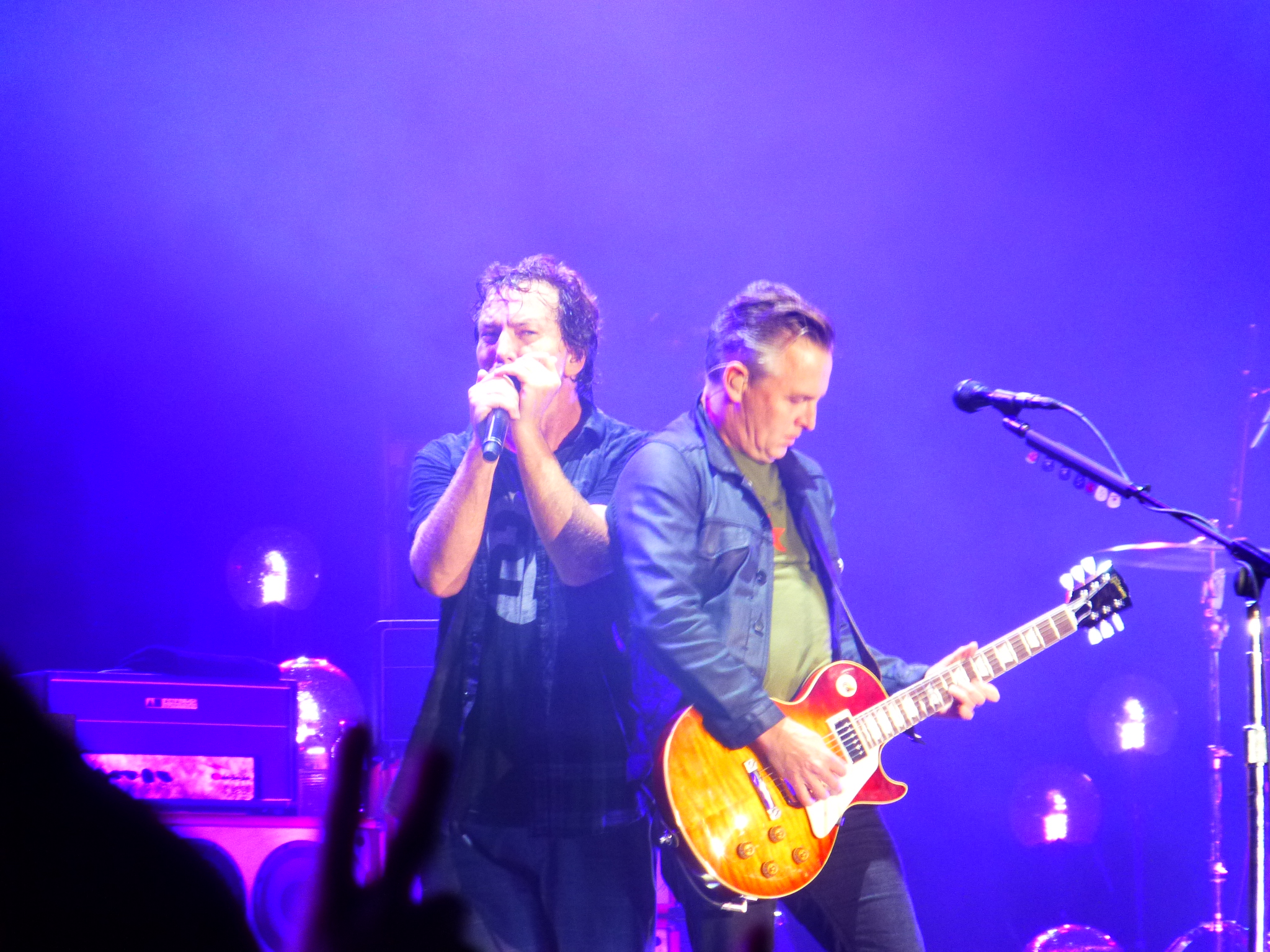
Eddie Vedder and Mike McCready at the Stadio Nereo Rocco, Trieste on June 22, 2014

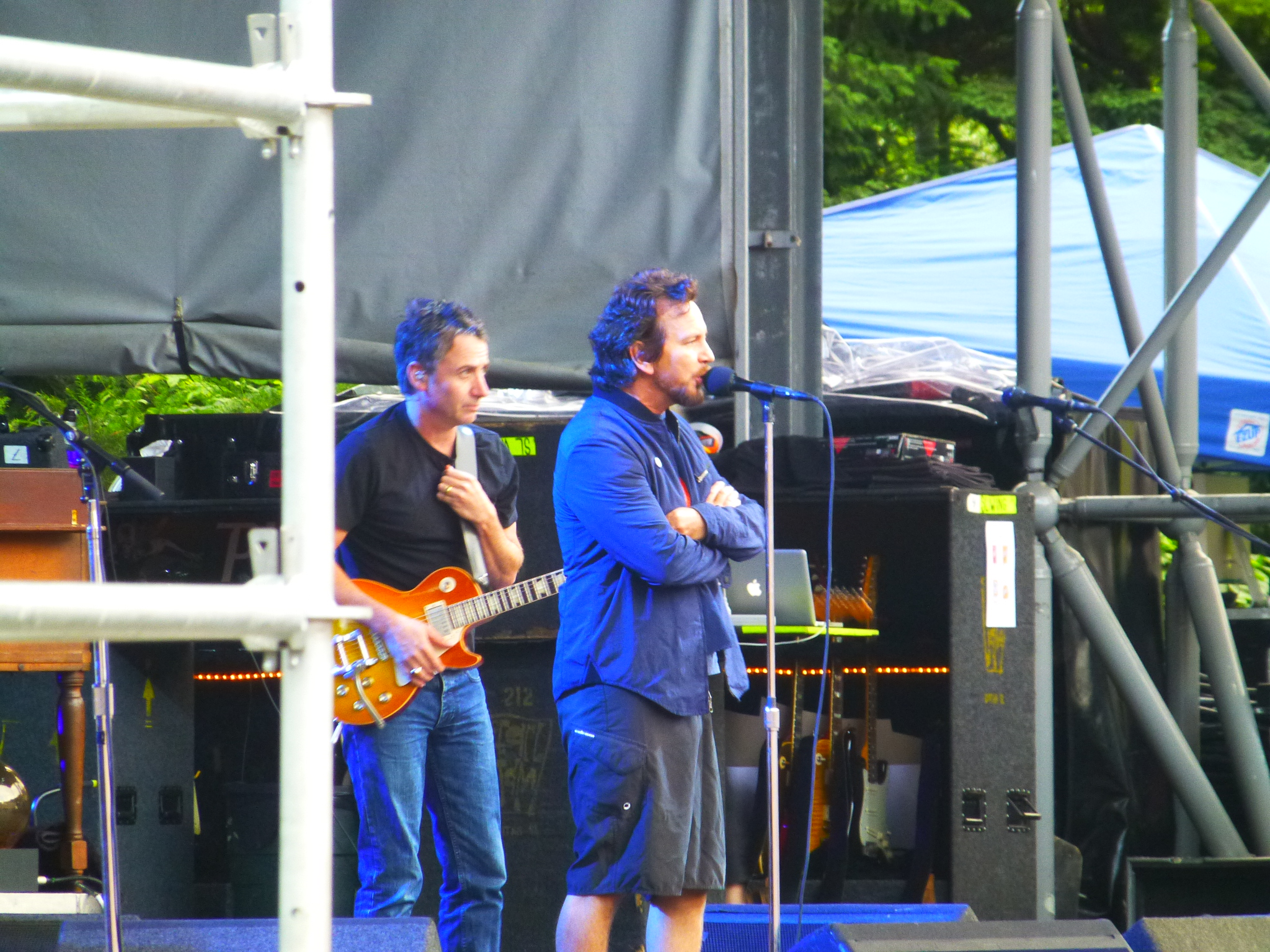
Eddie Vedder and Stone Gossard at the Wuhlheide, Berlin, on June 26, 2014

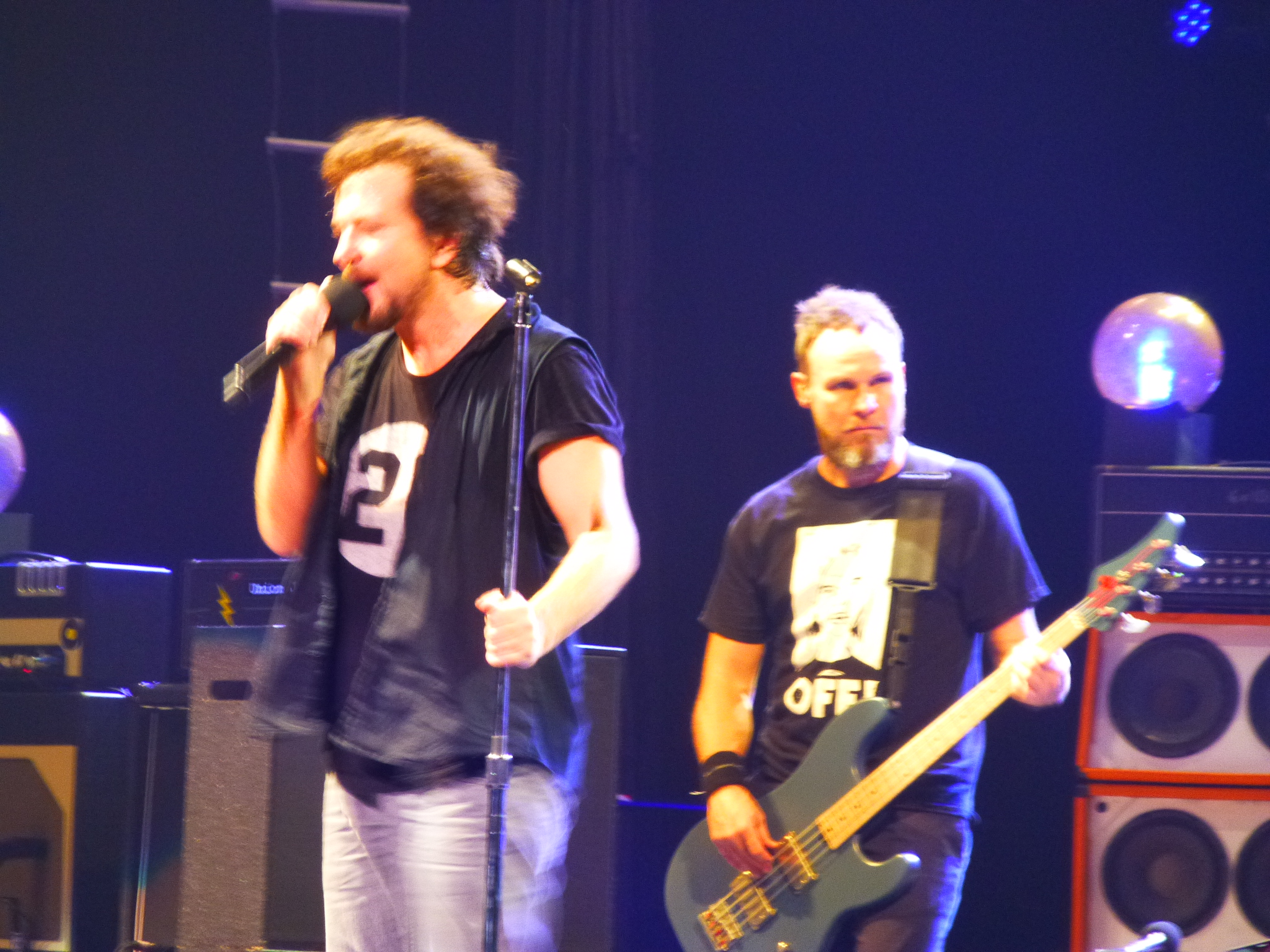
Eddie Vedder and Jeff Ament at the First Direct Arena, Leeds, July 8, 2014

Date	City	Country	Venue
July
July 16, 2013	London	Canada	Budweiser Gardens
July 19, 2013	Chicago	United States	Wrigley Field
North America leg 1
October 11, 2013	Pittsburgh	United States	Consol Energy Center
October 12, 2013	Buffalo	United States	First Niagara Center
October 15, 2013	Worcester	United States	DCU Center
October 16, 2013	Worcester	United States	DCU Center
October 18, 2013	Brooklyn	United States	Barclays Center
October 19, 2013	Brooklyn	United States	Barclays Center
October 21, 2013	Philadelphia	United States	Wells Fargo Center
October 22, 2013	Philadelphia	United States	Wells Fargo Center
October 25, 2013	Hartford	United States	XL Center
October 27, 2013	Baltimore	United States	Baltimore Arena
October 29, 2013	Charlottesville	United States	John Paul Jones Arena
October 30, 2013	Charlotte	United States	Time Warner Cable Arena
November 1, 2013	New Orleans	United States	Voodoo Music + Arts Experience
North America leg 2
November 15, 2013	Dallas	United States	American Airlines Arena
November 16, 2013	Oklahoma City	United States	Chesapeake Energy Arena
November 19, 2013	Glendale	United States	Jobing.com Arena
November 21, 2013	San Diego	United States	Viejas Arena
November 23, 2013	Los Angeles	United States	Sports Arena
November 24, 2013	Los Angeles	United States	Sports Arena
November 26, 2013	Oakland	United States	Oracle Arena
November 29, 2013	Portland	United States	Rose Garden Arena
November 30, 2013	Spokane	United States	Spokane Arena
December 2, 2013	Calgary	Canada	Scotiabank Saddledome
December 4, 2013	Vancouver	Canada	Rogers Arena
December 6, 2013	Seattle	United States	KeyArena
Oceania
January 17, 2014 ^{[A]}	Auckland	New Zealand	Western Springs Stadium
January 19, 2014 ^{[A]}	Gold Coast	Australia	Metricon Stadium
January 24, 2014 ^{[A]}	Melbourne	Australia	Flemington Racecourse
January 26, 2014 ^{[A]}	Sydney	Australia	Sydney Showgrounds
January 31, 2014 ^{[A]}	Adelaide	Australia	Bonython Park
February 2, 2014 ^{[A]}	Perth	Australia	Claremont Showground
Europe
June 16, 2014	Amsterdam	Netherlands	Ziggo Dome
June 17, 2014	Amsterdam	Netherlands	Ziggo Dome
June 20, 2014	Milan	Italy	San Siro Stadium
June 22, 2014	Trieste	Italy	Stadio Nereo Rocco
June 25, 2014	Vienna	Austria	Wiener Stadthalle
June 26, 2014	Berlin	Germany	Wuhlheide
June 28, 2014	Stockholm	Sweden	Friends Arena
June 29, 2014	Oslo	Norway	Telenor Arena
July 3, 2014	Gdynia	Poland	Open'er Festival
July 5, 2014	Werchter	Belgium	Rock Werchter
July 8, 2014	Leeds	England	First Direct Arena
July 11, 2014	Milton Keynes	England	Milton Keynes Bowl
North America
October 1, 2014	Cincinnati	United States	U.S. Bank Arena
October 3, 2014	St. Louis	United States	Scottrade Center
October 5, 2014 ^{[B]}	Austin	United States	Austin City Limits Music Festival
October 8, 2014	Tulsa	United States	BOK Center
October 9, 2014	Lincoln	United States	Pinnacle Bank Arena
October 12, 2014 ^{[B]}	Austin	United States	Austin City Limits Music Festival
October 14, 2014	Memphis	United States	FedExForum
October 16, 2014	Detroit	United States	Joe Louis Arena
October 17, 2014	Moline	United States	iWireless Center
October 19, 2014	Saint Paul	United States	Xcel Energy Center
October 20, 2014	Milwaukee	United States	BMO Harris Bradley Center
October 22, 2014	Denver	United States	Pepsi Center
October 25, 2014 ^{[C]}	Mountain View	United States	Shoreline Amphitheatre
October 26, 2014 ^{[C]}	Mountain View	United States	Shoreline Amphitheatre

Festivals and other miscellaneous performances

^{A} These concerts are part of the "Big Day Out"
^{B} These concerts are part of the "Austin City Limits Music Festival"
^{C} These concerts are part of the "Bridge School Benefit"

== Band members ==
Pearl Jam

- Jeff Ament – bass guitar
- Matt Cameron – drums
- Stone Gossard – rhythm guitar, lead guitar
- Mike McCready – lead guitar
- Eddie Vedder – lead vocals, guitar

Additional musicians

- Boom Gaspar – Hammond B3 and keyboards
