= Lightning Bolt (Pearl Jam album) =

2013 album

- Streaming and digital editions

Studio album by Pearl Jam
- Released: October 15, 2013
- Recorded: May 2011 – May 2013
- Studios: Henson Recording (Los Angeles); Studio X (Seattle); Studio Litho (Seattle)
- Genre: Alternative rock
- Length: 47:14
- Labels: Monkeywrench; Republic
- Producer: Brendan O'Brien

Pearl Jam chronology
9.11.2011 Toronto, Canada (2011)	Lightning Bolt (2013)	Let's Play Two (2017)

Singles from Lightning Bolt
- 1. "Mind Your Manners" Released: July 11, 2013; 2. "Sirens" Released: September 18, 2013; 3. "Lightning Bolt" Released: March 4, 2014

Lightning Bolt is the tenth studio album by the American rock band Pearl Jam. Produced by long-time Pearl Jam collaborator Brendan O'Brien, the album was released in the United States on October 15, 2013, through the band's own Monkeywrench Records, with Republic Records handling the international release one day earlier.

The band began composing new songs in 2011, the album's first recording sessions took place in early 2012 before the musicians decided to take a break. As all band members got into side projects afterwards, work on Lightning Bolt only resumed in March 2013. The music for Lightning Bolt has a harder rock sound with longer songs in contrast to predecessor Backspacer (2009), and the lyrics convey singer Eddie Vedder's feelings on aging and mortality.

Preceded by a promotional campaign focusing on Pearl Jam's website and social network profiles and two moderately successful singles, "Mind Your Manners" and "Sirens", Lightning Bolt was well received by critics, who considered the album an effective return to the band's old sound, and topped the charts in the United States, Canada, and Australia.

== Production ==
Soon after completing Backspacer in 2009, Pearl Jam and producer Brendan O'Brien intended to soon repeat the experience given that according to O'Brien "we had a really good time doing it.". In 2011, amidst preparations for the documentary Pearl Jam Twenty and its accompanying tour, the band recorded some tracks with O'Brien at Los Angeles' Henson Recording Studios, with the song "Olé" being issued as a free download. O'Brien considered that the studio helped the band get to a "submarine mentality, and everybody going into the ship together", and bassist Jeff Ament added that working outside the band's hometown Seattle led the musicians to work more efficiently.

After some time developing demos, the musicians returned to Henson in March 2012, where they recorded seven songs. However, they decided to take a break, as guitarist Mike McCready explained, "we had to take some time to figure out what we wanted to do." Guitarist Stone Gossard added that despite the bandmembers thinking that after the productive sessions the album was nearing completion, eventually they considered the tracks "didn’t feel strong enough for a record. Work on the album resumed only in March 2013 as the bandmembers regrouped with new compositions, mostly done separately in each member's home studio—though McCready at times worked along with drummer Matt Cameron—before the group reunited to finish the songs together. O'Brien attributed the long break to the band's busy schedule, as the musicians got into side projects after putting the Pearl Jam album on hold: singer Eddie Vedder started a solo tour, drummer Matt Cameron returned to Soundgarden, guitarist Stone Gossard rejoined side project Brad, Ament recorded solo album While My Heart Beats and started the project RNDM, and McCready formed the group Walking Papers while also taking part in a partial reunion of Mad Season. Vedder still considered that all the diversions helped Pearl Jam to have "more importance placed on the records" and focusing on making the best album possible. Like with previous records the songs had their first recordings with all the musicians playing together, though O'Brien added that with Lightning Bolt "we don’t keep as much of [the live recordings] as we used to." Guest musicians include O'Brien himself at the keyboards, long time keyboardist Boom Gaspar, and violinist Ann Marie Calhoun. After six weeks of new recording sessions, the album was mixed in Seattle at the band's desire, with the process taking place in Studio X.

== Composition ==
In contrast to the short tracks of Backspacer, Lightning Bolt features longer songs and a more experimental sound that McCready declared to aim for "a logical extension of what Backspacer was". Stone Gossard added that the band being more comfortable with the composing and recording process lead to "a slight return to some of the more sort of peculiar things we did, say, between No Code and Binaural." McCready said that "there's a Pink Floyd vibe to some of it, there's a punk rock edge to other stuff", with the lead singles "Mind Your Manners" and "Sirens" being inspired by the Dead Kennedys and a concert in Roger Waters' The Wall Live, respectively. Neil Young was noted as an influence in "Yellow Moon". O'Brien considered the track listing to have "a lot of drama" from the intensity of the musicians' work, but that the band itself were united and enjoying themselves during the creation process. According to Gossard, the album's simpler arrangements, "sussed out" songwriting and less production than in Backspacer made for songs that were easier to learn and play live. One of the tracks, "Sleeping by Myself", had been previously featured in Vedder's 2011 solo album Ukulele Songs. O'Brien suggested the re-recording as he thought that the composition was "a Pearl Jam song as far as I’m concerned." Another, "Pendulum", was originally composed during the Backspacer sessions.

While writing the lyrics to Lightning Bolt, Vedder tried to be less cryptic in expressing his feelings compared to the "word games" of previous Pearl Jam albums. The songs discuss lasting relationships, bad faith ("Getaway," "Mind Your Manners"), the state of the world ("Infallible") and life's transience ("Pendulum"), which Vedder summed up as "the same mysteries that I’ve been trying to unravel for a few decades now." Gossard explained that the reflective tone was indicative of the bandmembers' age: "[At] 40-something, almost 50-something, you're looking at life through your kids' eyes, through the filter of relationships that are 20 or 30 years long, through the filter of your parents getting older and the passing of friends and relatives-relationships and all that they encompass, the difficulties of them and the sacrifices you make in them and also the joy they bring you." Vedder at first was afraid of writing songs about mortality, but relented given he felt that "death is everywhere" and writing about death would help "getting through it", as "living to the day you die, and being cognizant of the end, you might lead a more appreciative life". One of the compositions about the theme was "Future Days", which discusses the loss of Vedder's friend Dennis Flemion, who accidentally drowned in 2012. The concernment in the songs also owed to Vedder being a father, as the singer detailed that "It’s going to be their world and what is their future? It feels like there is a lot that can be lost in the next 50 years if people don’t pay attention."

== Release and promotion ==
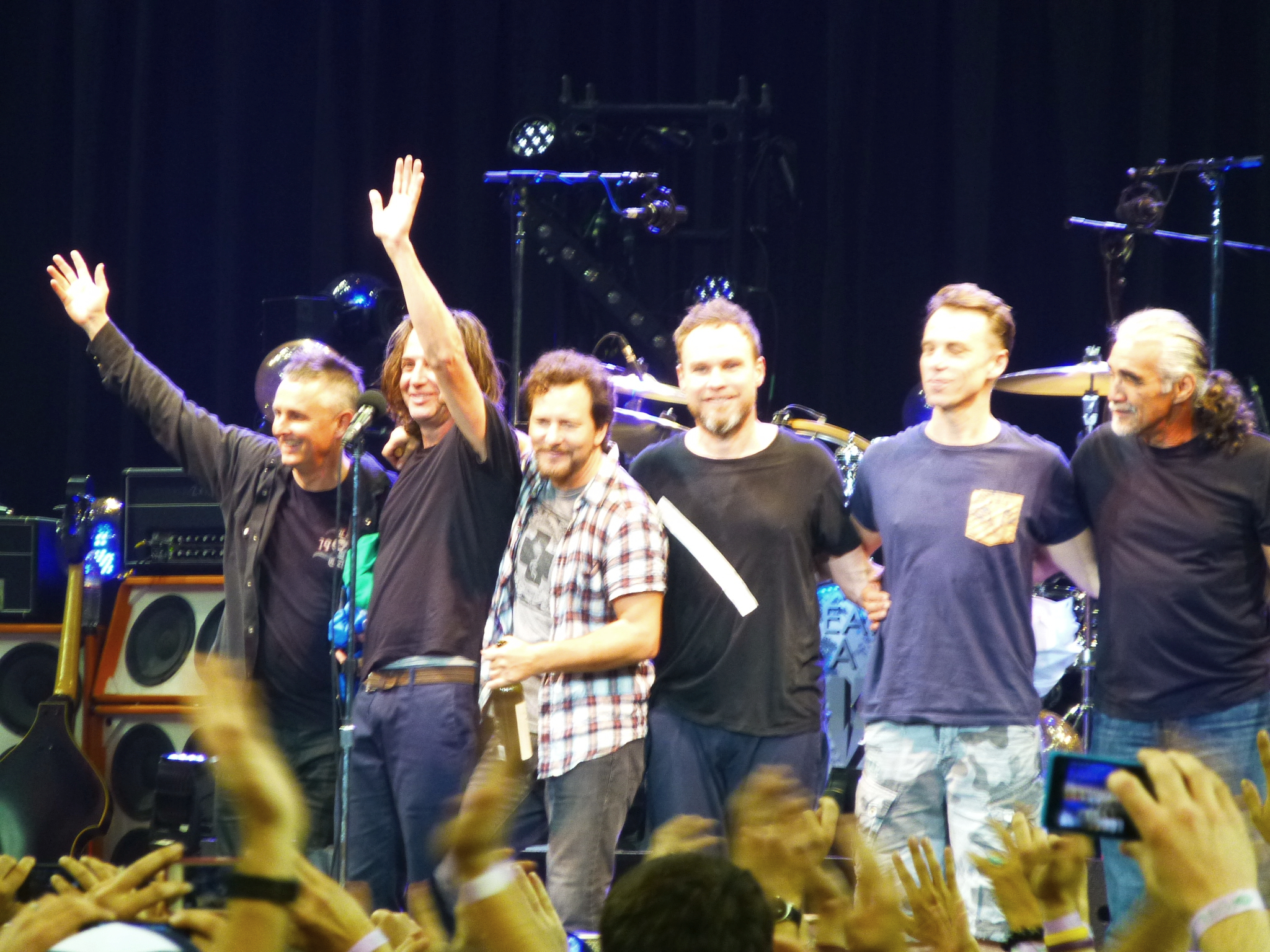
Pearl Jam on the Lightning Bolt Tour at the Oracle Arena in Oakland, California, November 26, 2013

Pearl Jam's website and social network pages were extensively used to create expectations and excitement for the upcoming album, with two countdown clocks being posted on the band's website. The first was revealed July 1, 2013, and once it hit zero a week later, the site had an announcement of a 24 date two-leg tour in North America from October 11, 2013, through December 6, 2013. After the tour was revealed, the PearlJam.com countdown clock reset, showing a new countdown which was set to end on July 11, 2013, and afterwards lead to news of the band's tenth studio album Lightning Bolt being released on October 15, 2013. On the same day the band revealed lead single "Mind Your Manners" through digital download, radio airplay and an audio-only YouTube video. The track received heavy airplay on rock radio, debuting at 12th on the Billboard Rock Airplay charts, and with 14,000 downloads reached number 14 at Rock Digital Songs and 12 on the Alternative Rock Tracks charts. An official Pearl Jam app was made available on iTunes on July 25, 2013, and through the final week of August, the band's Twitter revealed Lightning Bolt's track list through the artwork made by designer Don Pendleton for each track. "Mind Your Manners" was played live for the first time at their show in London, Ontario on July 16, 2013. Three days later the band debuted two more songs, "Lightning Bolt" and "Future Days," during a show at Wrigley Field. On August 23, 2013, the music video was released for "Mind Your Manners," directed by Danny Clinch.

On September 18, 2013, the band released Lightning Bolt's second single, "Sirens", and put online a short documentary directed by Danny Clinch where the bandmembers discussed the new album with friends Carrie Brownstein, Judd Apatow, Mark Richards and Steve Gleason. Ament suggested the concept of the video inspired by the Vanity Fair Comedy Issue, thinking it would be a variant on traditional press interviews. On September 23, 2013, the music video was released for "Sirens", also directed by Clinch. A special listening party with fans was held by SiriusXM at Seattle's Studio X eleven days before the album's release. Monkeywrench Records and Republic Records sent the album's title track, "Lightning Bolt" to mainstream rock and modern rock radio on March 4, 2014, as the album's third single.

Pearl Jam released the album through Monkeywrench Records/Republic Records in conjunction with Universal Music Group in the United States. The album also saw release through the band's official website, independent record stores and online retailers. It was made available to stream for free for a limited time on iTunes on October 7, 2013, in the run up to the official release. The band promoted the release of the album with a week-long programme of shows on Late Night with Jimmy Fallon, which included live performances of "Sirens" and the title track "Lightning Bolt". Pearl Jam also licensed the songs of Lightning Bolt along with 36 other tracks from their catalog to Fox Sports for the network's coverage of the 2013 World Series.

=== Lightning Bolt Tour ===
Pearl Jam promoted the album with shows in North America in 2013 before a tour of Oceania in January 2014. The band headlined the Voodoo Music + Arts Experience on November 1, 2013. The shows in Oceania were part of the Big Day Out festival. On November 15, 2013, drummer Matt Cameron announced that he would not be touring with Soundgarden in 2014, due to prior commitments promoting Lightning Bolt. On December 13, 2013, the band announced an eleven-date European leg starting on June 16, 2014. In May 2014, the band announced a ten-date tour of the American Midwest starting on October 1, 2014, to coincide with two appearances at the Austin City Limits Music Festival. To conclude the tour, the band played at the annual Bridge School Benefit in Mountain View, California. In March 2015 the band announced a nine-date tour of Latin America, scheduled to start in November.

=== Packaging ===
The artwork for Lightning Bolt was made by Don Pendleton, who is best known as a skateboard graphic artist. Ament bought some of Pendleton's paintings "in 2008 or 2009" and later asked the artist to do a logo for their upcoming album, which would later develop into all the illustrations. The bassist then kept in contact with Pendleton to guide his work, sending him the song lyrics, some sketches he had done and an unmastered copy of the album. The intention was to "make something that was a total package", according to Pendleton, who said that there was an attempt to bring back "these classic LPs in the days where you would read the lyrics. You related the band to the imagery to the song to the lyrics." Pendleton tried to "keep it iconic with some symbols but also really heavy with archetypes", given the body of images could be used consistently with all of the promotion. While some of the graphics evolved directly from Ament's sketches, Pendleton took some inspiration from his past work, such as a series of skateboards he painted "based around icons and logos", and the very first image sent to Ament, an eye with a lightning bolt which Pendleton made back in 2006 for a failed project, that evolved into the album cover. Said cover was painted by hand as Pendleton wanted "something so geometric that there would be some flaws in it, especially compared to the vector/computer stuff". Republic Records art designer Joe Spix then handled the presentation, with particular detail in the vinyl packaging. Pendleton also painted Ament's bass, Pearl Jam-themed shirts for Volcom, and posters for the Barclays Center concerts in October 2013. At the 57th Annual Grammy Awards in February 2015, the album won the award for Best Recording Package.

== Critical reception ==
Professional ratings
Aggregate scores
Source	Rating
AnyDecentMusic?	6.5/10
Metacritic	73/100
Review scores
Source	Rating
The A.V. Club	B+
AllMusic	4/5 stars
Chicago Tribune	3/4 stars
Entertainment Weekly	B+
New York Daily News	4/5 stars
PopMatters	8/10
Rolling Stone	3.5/5 stars
The Guardian	3/5 stars
Slant Magazine	3/5 stars
Spin	6/10

Upon its release, Lightning Bolt was met with generally positive reviews from music critics. At Metacritic, which assigns a normalized rating out of 100 to reviews from mainstream critics, the album received an average score of 73, based on 33 reviews, indicating "generally favorable reviews". Stephen Thomas Erlewine of AllMusic gave the album four out of five stars, stating that the band seemed more settled and comfortable while "accentuating the big riffs and bigger emotions, crafting songs without a worry as to whether they're hip or not and, most importantly, enjoying the deep-rooted, nervy arena rock that is uniquely their own." Jim Farber of the New York Daily News gave the album four out of five stars, commenting that while "some key sounds and sensibilities" and uplifting lyrics were unlike Pearl Jam's earlier style, the music in Lightning Bolt marked a return to the "thick-bottomed rhythms, hard-nosed guitars and darkened tone of classic Pearl Jam" compared to predecessor Backspacer. Cole Waterman of PopMatters gave the album an eight out of ten, praising "Pearl Jam thriving in their persona, building on what worked in the past without trying to copy it while adding new elements to the mix" and feeling that despite "the closing songs get[ting] monotonous in their united balladry", "Future Days" was a good album closer, comparing it to Tom Waits.

Dom Lawson of The Guardian gave the album three out of five stars, describing it as "a sturdy return to great form". Tom Willmott of The Independent gave the album three out of five stars, considering Lightning Bolt to "offer a broad range of styles" and praising the rock-focused tracks. Will Hermes of Rolling Stone gave the album three and a half stars out of five, saying that Eddie Vedder's earnest lyrics and vocals made for compelling tracks, and that the musicians "overthink, overemote and overreach — fruitfully". Josh Modell of The A.V. Club gave the album a B+, complaining about the excessive length and "a couple too many songs that revisit the past without any fresh insight" while feeling that "the album still feels fresher and more relevant than the world at large might expect at this point." Marc Hirsh of The Boston Globe considered the album to showcase that Pearl Jam "has plenty of spark left", comparing it to both the "dense eclecticism" of the band's own Vitalogy (1994), and "The Who’s solidity of purpose". "My Father's Son" was described as one of Vedder's "most intense performances to date" and a "sturdy return to great form".

Some reviewers still felt that Lightning Bolt was not up to the standards set by the band's previous work. Blue Sullivan of Slant Magazine gave the album three out of five stars, saying that the album had a "familiar spark" and was dragged down by "Pearl Jam's antiseptic '70s-album-rock-radio conservatism, along with frontman Eddie Vedder's ham-fisted lyrics", ultimately concluding that "Lightning Bolt is no masterwork. Years removed from the raw emotion and desperate appetites of youth, Pearl Jam has slipped into alt-rock elder statesmanship as one would a comfortable old sweater." Rob Harvilla of Spin gave the album a six out of ten, describing it as "far from an implosion, far from spectacular", criticizing the focus on calm songs and considering that Backspacer "barked louder and bit harder overall." In his 5.0 out of 10 review for Pitchfork, Stuart Berman also had a negative reaction to what he described as "centerpiece ballads [that] tread on odious Lite-FM territory and forcefully tip the scales from poignant to maudlin". Philip Cosores of Paste gave the album a 4.0 out of 10, saying "The album does grow on the listener, as Vedder's voice and the band's seeming ambivalence to all musical trends and developments outside of them is strangely comforting. And maybe some of these songs will come alive when performed, but there is not a single one to love in the set. Essentially, the cruise control is running onward with disregard for all the maintenance and repairs that an engine needs, and the result is the worst album of their career."

== Commercial performance ==
Lightning Bolt became Pearl Jam's fifth studio album to have debuted at number one on the Billboard 200 chart, with first-week sales of 166,000 copies in the United States. In its second week the album sold 46,000 copies holding the number two position on the chart. The album also debuted at number one in Canada, selling 23,000 copies in its first week, and becoming the band's second consecutive album to debut at number one on the Canadian Albums Chart. In Australia, Lightning Bolt became Pearl Jam's eighth chart-topper at the ARIA Charts. Lightning Bolt debuted at second at the UK Albums Chart, being Pearl Jam's highest-charting album in the United Kingdom since 1993's Vs. The album also topped the music charts in Belgium, Ireland, Croatia and Portugal, and held the second spot in the Netherlands, Italy, New Zealand, Norway and Switzerland.

== Track listing ==
All lyrics are written by Eddie Vedder.

No.	Title	Music	Length
1.	"Getaway"	Vedder	3:26
2.	"Mind Your Manners"	Mike McCready	2:38
3.	"My Father's Son"	Jeff Ament	3:07
4.	"Sirens"	McCready	5:41
5.	"Lightning Bolt"	Vedder	4:13
6.	"Infallible"	Ament, Stone Gossard	5:22
7.	"Pendulum"	Ament, Gossard	3:44
8.	"Swallowed Whole"	Vedder	3:51
9.	"Let the Records Play"	Gossard	3:46
10.	"Sleeping by Myself"	Vedder	3:04
11.	"Yellow Moon"	Ament	3:52
12.	"Future Days"	Vedder	4:22
Total length:			47:14

== Personnel ==
Pearl Jam

- Eddie Vedder – vocals, guitar; ukulele on "Sleeping by Myself"
- Jeff Ament – bass; bowed guitar and keyboard on "Pendulum"
- Matt Cameron – drums, percussion; backing vocals on "Sirens"
- Stone Gossard – guitar; bongo drums on "Pendulum"
- Mike McCready – guitar; six-string bass on "My Father's Son"

Additional musicians

- Brendan O'Brien – keyboards, guitar
- Boom Gaspar – keyboards
- Ann Marie Calhoun – strings

Technical personnel

- Brendan O'Brien – production, mixing
- Tom Syrowski – recording engineer
- Martin Cooke – recording engineer
- Billy Joe Bowers – recording engineer, mastering
- John Burton – recording engineer
- Nick DiDia – recording engineer
- Tom Tapley – recording engineer
- Floyd Reitsma – recording engineer

== Charts ==
=== Weekly charts ===
Chart (2013)	Peak position
Australian Albums (ARIA)	1
Austrian Albums (Ö3 Austria)	3
Belgian Albums (Ultratop Flanders)	1
Belgian Albums (Ultratop Wallonia)	4
Canadian Albums (Billboard)	1
Croatian Albums (IFPI)	1
Czech Albums (ČNS IFPI)	8
Danish Albums (Hitlisten)	3
Dutch Albums (Album Top 100)	2
Finnish Albums (Suomen virallinen lista)	8
French Albums (SNEP)	20
German Albums (Offizielle Top 100)	4
Greek Albums (IFPI)	7
Hungarian Albums (MAHASZ)	9
Irish Albums (IRMA)	1
Italian Albums (FIMI)	2
Japanese Albums (Oricon)	46
New Zealand Albums (Recorded Music NZ)	2
Norwegian Albums (VG-lista)	2
Polish Albums (ZPAV)	3
Portuguese Albums (AFP)	1
Scottish Albums (Official Charts)	2
Spanish Albums (Promusicae)	3
Swedish Albums (Sverigetopplistan)	12
Swiss Albums (Schweizer Hitparade)	2
UK Albums (Official Charts)	2
UK Rock & Metal Albums (Official Charts)	1
US Billboard 200	1
US Top Alternative Albums (Billboard)	1
US Top Hard Rock Albums (Billboard)	1
US Top Rock Albums (Billboard)	1

=== Year-end charts ===
Chart (2013)	Position
Australian Albums (ARIA)	75
Belgian Albums (Ultratop Flanders)	39
Belgian Albums (Ultratop Wallonia)	132
Canadian Albums (Billboard)	47
Dutch Albums (Album Top 100)	30
Italian Albums (FIMI)	30
Swiss Albums (Schweizer Hitparade)	81
US Billboard 200	99
US Top Alternative Albums (Billboard)	16
US Top Hard Rock Albums (Billboard)	5
US Top Rock Albums (Billboard)	24
Chart (2014)	Position
Belgian Albums (Ultratop Flanders)	103
Italian Albums (FIMI)	74
US Billboard 200	194
US Top Alternative Albums (Billboard)	25
US Top Hard Rock Albums (Billboard)	9
US Top Rock Albums (Billboard)	44

== Certifications and sales ==
Region	Certification	Certified units/sales
Australia (ARIA)	Gold	35,000^{^}
Canada (Music Canada)	Platinum	80,000^{^}
Italy (FIMI)	Platinum	60,000^{*}
Poland (ZPAV)	Gold	10,000^{*}
Portugal (AFP)	3× Platinum	45,000^{^}
United Kingdom (BPI)	Silver	60,000^{‡}
United States	—	411,310
^{*} Sales figures based on certification alone.^{^} Shipments figures based on certification alone.^{‡} Sales+streaming figures based on certification alone.

== Release history ==
Region	Date	Format	Label
Australia	October 14, 2013	CD, digital download, LP	Monkeywrench, Republic
Belgium	October 14, 2013	CD, digital download, LP	Monkeywrench, Republic
Denmark	October 14, 2013	CD, digital download, LP	Monkeywrench, Republic
France	October 14, 2013	CD, digital download, LP	Monkeywrench, Republic
Ireland	October 14, 2013	CD, digital download, LP	Monkeywrench, Republic
Italy	October 14, 2013	CD, digital download, LP	Monkeywrench, Republic
Netherlands	October 14, 2013	CD, digital download, LP	Monkeywrench, Republic
New Zealand	October 14, 2013	CD, digital download, LP	Monkeywrench, Republic
Norway	October 14, 2013	CD, digital download, LP	Monkeywrench, Republic
Spain	October 14, 2013	CD, digital download, LP	Monkeywrench, Republic
Sweden	October 14, 2013	CD, digital download, LP	Monkeywrench, Republic
Switzerland	October 14, 2013	CD, digital download, LP	Monkeywrench, Republic
United Kingdom	October 14, 2013	CD, digital download, LP	Monkeywrench, Republic
Germany	October 14, 2013	CD, digital download, LP	Monkeywrench, Republic
United States	October 15, 2013	CD, digital download, LP	Monkeywrench, Republic
Canada	October 15, 2013	CD, digital download, LP	Monkeywrench, Republic
