= Dark Matter World Tour =

2024–25 concert tour by Pearl Jam

- Tour by Pearl Jam
- Location: Europe; North America; Oceania
- Associated album: Dark Matter
- Start date: May 4, 2024
- End date: May 18, 2025
- Legs: 5
- No. of shows: 48
- Supporting acts: Deep Sea Diver; The Murder Capital; Glen Hansard; Pixies; Dead Pioneers; Teen Jesus and the Jean Teasers
- Box office: $120 million (30 shows)

Pearl Jam concert chronology
- Gigaton Tour (2022–23); Dark Matter World Tour (2024–25)

The Dark Matter World Tour was a concert tour by the American rock band Pearl Jam in support of their twelfth studio album Dark Matter (2024). The tour began on May 4, 2024, at the Rogers Arena in Vancouver, Canada, and concluded on May 18, 2025, at the PPG Paints Arena in Pittsburgh, United States.

The first leg of the tour consisted of eleven shows on the West Coast. The second leg of the tour, focused in Europe, originally had 9 scheduled shows, however, their June 29 London show as well as their July 2 and July 3 shows in Berlin were cancelled due to illness in the band. The third leg returned to North America with a mix of shows in the East Coast, Midwest, and Western United States. On July 25, 2024, Pearl Jam announced they would be playing two shows at the band run Ohana Festival which would be added at the end of the third leg of the tour. The fourth leg of the tour went to Oceania, featuring shows in New Zealand and Australia. The fifth leg of the tour was announced on December 5, 2024, with additional date on the New Orleans Jazz & Heritage Festival on January 15, 2025, and consisted of 11 shows focused on the Southeastern United States.

The tour was the band's last to feature longtime drummer Matt Cameron, who announced his departure from the group in July 2025.

== Opening acts ==
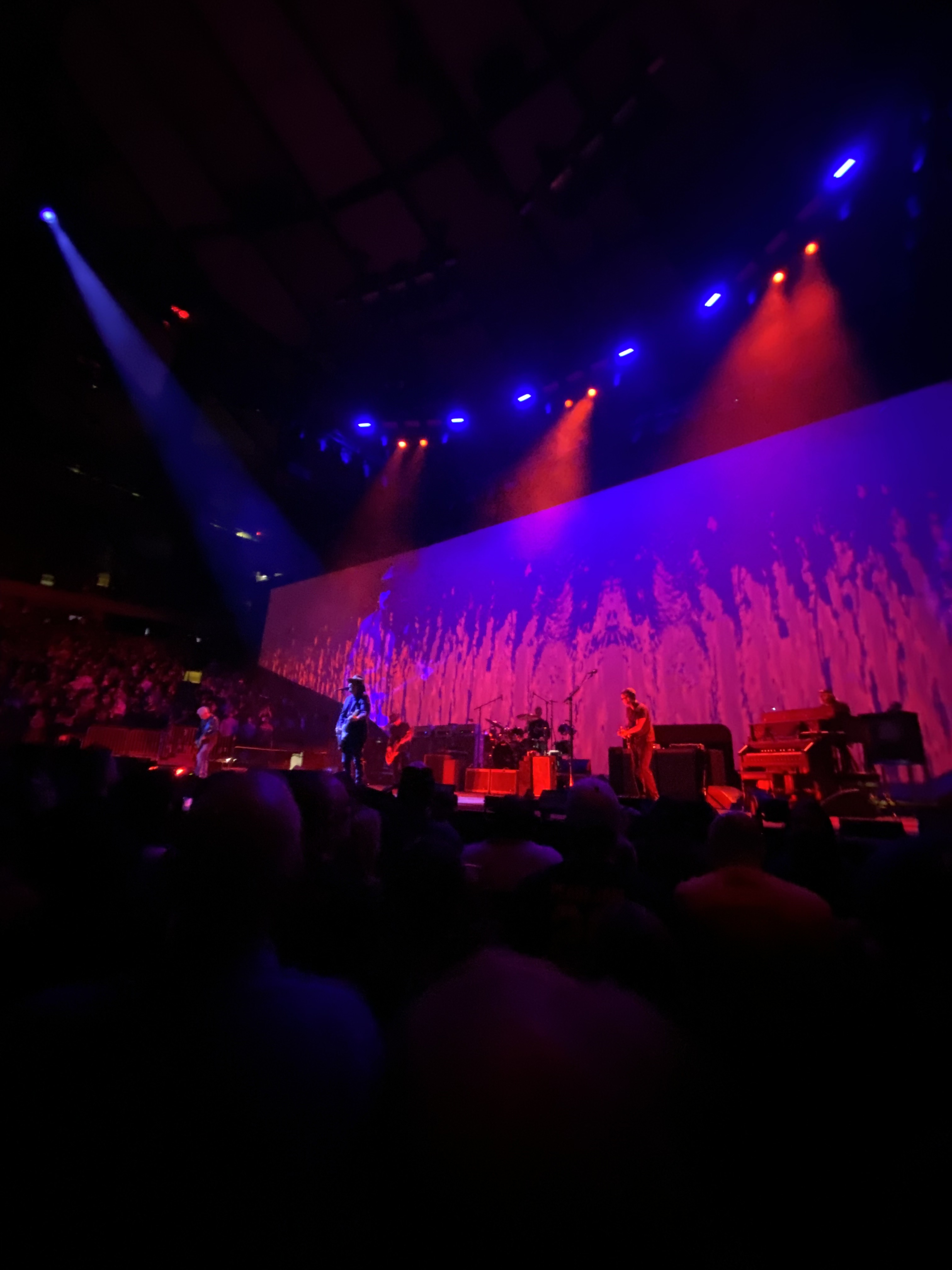
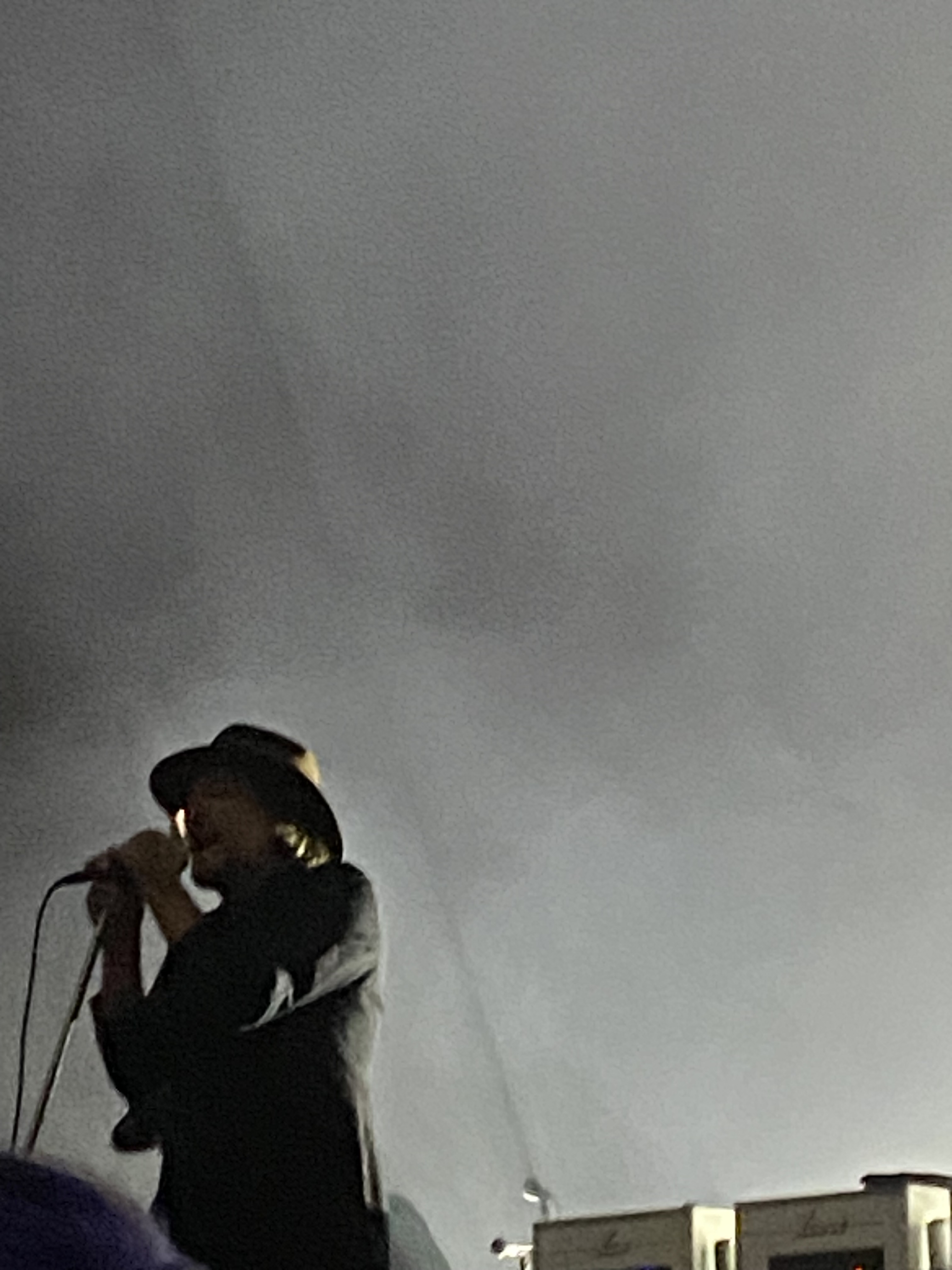
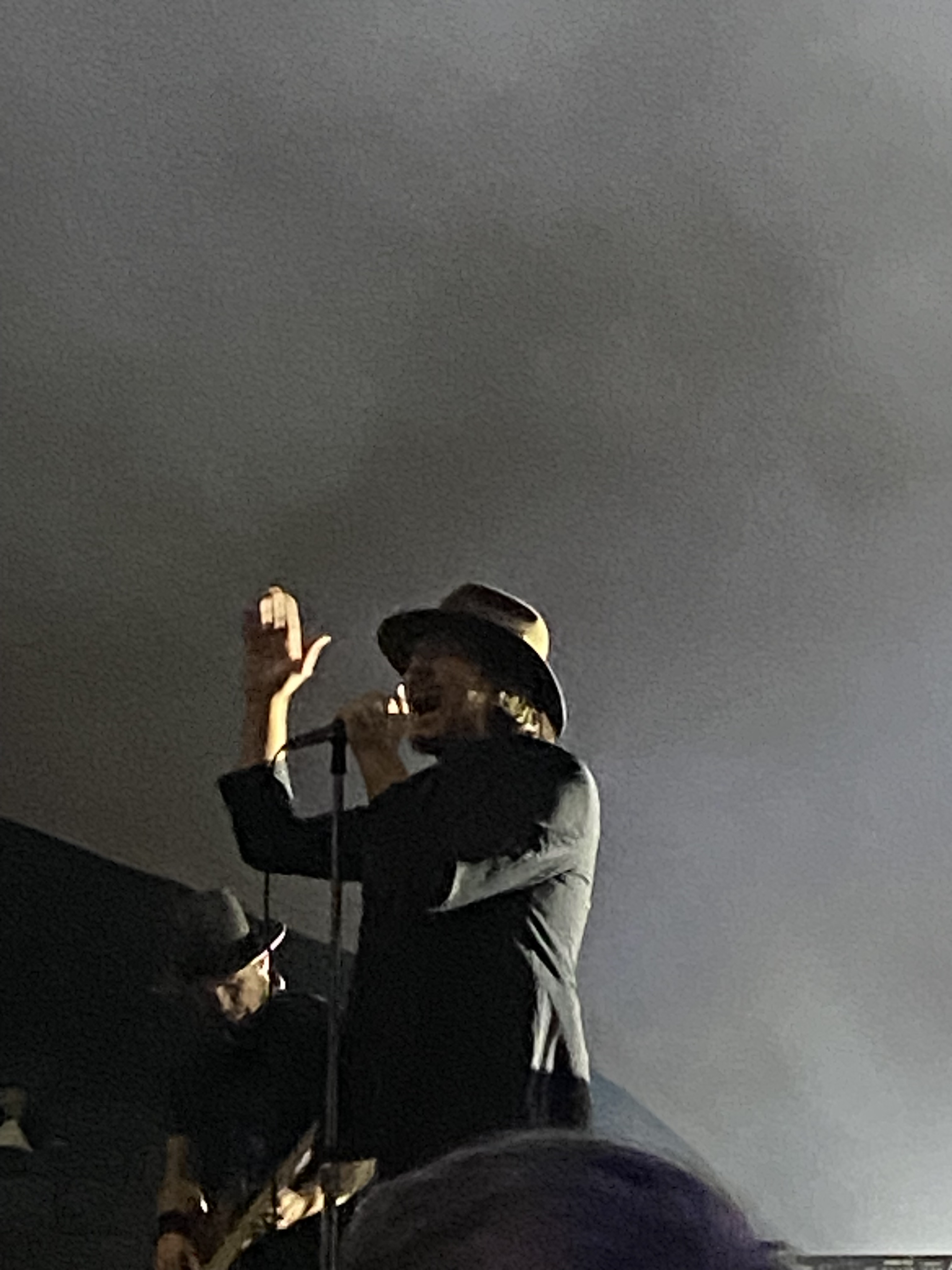
The band’s concert at Madison Square Garden on September 3, 2024

Seattle band Deep Sea Diver were the openers for leg one. The Murder Capital and Richard Ashcroft both opened for the band on the second leg. Glen Hansard opened on the third leg of the tour, and the fourth leg was opened by Pixies for every show on the leg, and Liam Finn, Teen Jesus and the Jean Teasers, and Cosmic Psychos for select shows.

== Set list ==
The following set list was obtained from the concert held on August 22, 2024, at the Washington-Grizzly Stadium in Missoula, United States. It does not represent all concerts for the duration of the tour.

1. "Given to Fly"
2. "Nothing as It Seems"
3. "Low Light"
4. "Why Go"
5. "Corduroy"
6. "Elderly Woman Behind the Counter in a Small Town"
7. "Scared of Fear"
8. "React, Respond"
9. "Wreckage"
10. "Even Flow"
11. "Hard to Imagine"
12. "Dark Matter"
13. "Won’t Tell"
14. "Upper Hand"
15. "Jeremy"
16. "Gimme Some Truth" (John Lennon cover)
17. "Porch"
18. "Her Majesty" (The Beatles cover)
19. "Just Breathe"
20. "Smile"
21. "Wasted Reprise"
22. "Life Wasted"
23. "Do the Evolution"
24. "Setting Sun"
25. "Alive"
26. "Rockin' in the Free World" (Neil Young cover)

== Tour dates ==
List of 2024 concerts, showing date, city, country, venue, opening act, tickets sold, number of available tickets and amount of gross revenue
| Date (2024) | City | Country | Venue | Opening acts | Attendance | Revenue |
|---|---|---|---|---|---|---|
| May 4 | Vancouver | Canada | Rogers Arena | Deep Sea Diver | 27,654 / 27,654 | $4,262,442 |
| May 6 | Vancouver | Canada | Rogers Arena | Deep Sea Diver | 27,654 / 27,654 | $4,262,442 |
| May 10 | Portland | United States | Moda Center | Deep Sea Diver | 14,088 / 14,088 | $2,125,364 |
| May 13 | Sacramento | United States | Golden 1 Center | Deep Sea Diver | 11,787 / 11,787 | $2,299,936 |
| May 16 | Las Vegas | United States | MGM Grand Garden Arena | Deep Sea Diver | 25,180 / 25,180 | $4,672,853 |
| May 18 | Las Vegas | United States | MGM Grand Garden Arena | Deep Sea Diver | 25,180 / 25,180 | $4,672,853 |
| May 21 | Inglewood (Note: Listed as Los Angeles in promotional material) | United States | Kia Forum | Deep Sea Diver | 27,823 / 27,823 | $4,664,690 |
| May 22 | Inglewood | United States | Kia Forum | Deep Sea Diver | 27,823 / 27,823 | $4,664,690 |
| May 25 (Note: The May 25, 2024 performance was a part of the Bottle Rock Festival.) | Napa Valley | United States | Napa Valley Expo | —N/a | —N/a | —N/a |
| May 28 | Seattle | United States | Climate Pledge Arena | Deep Sea Diver | 29,423 / 29,423 | $5,893,644 |
| May 30 | Seattle | United States | Climate Pledge Arena | Deep Sea Diver | 29,423 / 29,423 | $5,893,644 |
| June 22 | Dublin | Ireland | Marlay Park | The Murder Capital | — | — |
| June 25 | Manchester | England | Co-Op Live | The Murder Capital | — | — |
| July 6 | Barcelona | Spain | Palau Sant Jordi | The Murder Capital | — | — |
| July 8 | Barcelona | Spain | Palau Sant Jordi | The Murder Capital | — | — |
| July 11 (Note: The July 11, 2024 performance was a part of the Mad Cool Festival.) | Madrid | Spain | Iberdrola Music | —N/a | —N/a | —N/a |
| July 13 (Note: The July 13, 2024 performance was a part of the Nos Alive Festival.) | Lisbon | Portugal | Passeio Marítimo de Algés | —N/a | —N/a | —N/a |
| August 22 | Missoula | United States | Washington–Grizzly Stadium | Glen Hansard | 25,326 / 25,326 | $3,932,418 |
| August 26 | Noblesville (Note: Listed as Indianapolis in promotional material) | United States | Ruoff Music Center | Glen Hansard | 24,697 / 24,697 | $2,282,757 |
| August 29 | Chicago | United States | Wrigley Field | Glen Hansard | 81,910 / 81,910 | $13,689,882 |
| August 31 | Chicago | United States | Wrigley Field | Glen Hansard | 81,910 / 81,910 | $13,689,882 |
| September 3 | New York | United States | Madison Square Garden | Glen Hansard | 28,600 / 28,600 | $5,800,000 |
| September 4 | New York | United States | Madison Square Garden | Glen Hansard | 28,600 / 28,600 | $5,800,000 |
| September 7 | Philadelphia | United States | Wells Fargo Center | Glen Hansard | 29,132 / 29,132 | $6,300,000 |
| September 9 | Philadelphia | United States | Wells Fargo Center | Glen Hansard | 29,132 / 29,132 | $6,300,000 |
| September 12 | Baltimore | United States | CFG Bank Arena | Glen Hansard | 12,188 / 12,188 | $2,600,000 |
| September 15 | Boston | United States | Fenway Park | Glen Hansard | 74,802 / 74,802 | $12,547,015 |
| September 17 | Boston | United States | Fenway Park | Glen Hansard | 74,802 / 74,802 | $12,547,015 |
| September 27 (Note: The performances on September 27 and 29, 2024 were part of Ohana Festival.) | Dana Point | United States | Doheny State Beach | —N/a | —N/a | —N/a |
| September 29 | Dana Point | United States | Doheny State Beach | —N/a | —N/a | —N/a |
| November 8 | Auckland | New Zealand | Mount Smart Stadium | Pixies; Liam Finn | 71,000 / 71,000 | $7,900,000 |
| November 10 | Auckland | New Zealand | Mount Smart Stadium | Pixies; Liam Finn | 71,000 / 71,000 | $7,900,000 |
| November 13 | Gold Coast | Australia | People First Stadium | Pixies | 46,900 / 46,900 | $7,000,000 |
| November 16 | Melbourne | Australia | Marvel Stadium | Pixies; Cosmic Psychos | 116,000 / 116,000 | $15,700,000 |
| November 18 | Melbourne | Australia | Marvel Stadium | Pixies; Teen Jesus and the Jean Teasers | 116,000 / 116,000 | $15,700,000 |
| November 21 | Sydney | Australia | ENGIE Stadium | Pixies; Cosmic Psychos | 80,000 / 80,000 | $11,100,000 |
| November 23 | Sydney | Australia | ENGIE Stadium | Pixies; Teen Jesus and the Jean Teasers | 80,000 / 80,000 | $11,100,000 |

List of 2025 concerts, showing date, city, country, venue, opening act, tickets sold, number of available tickets and amount of gross revenue
| Date (2025) | City | Country | Venue | Opening acts | Attendance | Revenue |
|---|---|---|---|---|---|---|
| April 24 | Hollywood | United States | Hard Rock Live | Dead Pioneers | — | — |
| April 26 | Hollywood | United States | Hard Rock Live | Dead Pioneers | — | — |
| April 29 | Atlanta | United States | State Farm Arena | Dead Pioneers | — | — |
| May 1 | Atlanta | United States | State Farm Arena | Dead Pioneers | — | — |
| May 3 (Note: The May 3, 2025 performance was a part of the New Orleans Jazz & Heritage Festival.) | New Orleans | United States | Fair Grounds Race Course | —N/a | —N/a | —N/a |
| May 6 | Nashville | United States | Bridgestone Arena | Teen Jesus and the Jean Teasers | — | — |
| May 8 | Nashville | United States | Bridgestone Arena | Teen Jesus and the Jean Teasers | — | — |
| May 11 | Raleigh | United States | Lenovo Center | Teen Jesus and the Jean Teasers | — | — |
| May 13 | Raleigh | United States | Lenovo Center | Teen Jesus and the Jean Teasers | — | — |
| May 16 | Pittsburgh | United States | PPG Paints Arena | Teen Jesus and the Jean Teasers | — | — |
| May 18 | Pittsburgh | United States | PPG Paints Arena | Teen Jesus and the Jean Teasers | — | — |
| Total | | | | | 726,510 | $112,771,001 |

== Cancelled dates ==
| Date | City | Country | Venue | Reason for cancellation |
|---|---|---|---|---|
| June 29, 2024 | London | England | Tottenham Hotspur Stadium | Illness |
| July 2, 2024 | Berlin | Germany | Waldbühne | Illness |
| July 3, 2024 | Berlin | Germany | Waldbühne | Illness |

== Personnel ==
Pearl Jam

- Jeff Ament – bass guitar
- Stone Gossard – rhythm guitar
- Mike McCready – lead guitar
- Eddie Vedder – lead vocals, rhythm guitar
- Matt Cameron – drums

Additional musicians

- Boom Gaspar – hammond B3, keyboards
- Josh Klinghoffer – guitars, keyboards
