= Sirens (Pearl Jam song) =

Single by Pearl Jam

from the album Lightning Bolt
- Released: September 18, 2013
- Length: 5:41
- Label: Monkeywrench
- Composer: Mike McCready
- Lyricist: Eddie Vedder
- Producer: Brendan O'Brien

Pearl Jam singles chronology
"Mind Your Manners" (2013)	"Sirens" (2013)	"Lightning Bolt" (2014)

Music video
- "Sirens" on YouTube

"Sirens" is a song by the American rock band Pearl Jam. It was released on September 18, 2013 as a digital download as the second single from their tenth studio album Lightning Bolt. In its first week of release, the single sold 13,000 downloads in the United States. Guitarist Mike McCready said the song was inspired by Roger Waters's The Wall Live Tour, when after attending a concert in 2011, he "wanted to write something that would have a Pink Floyd type feel". The lyrics by singer Eddie Vedder concern his worries on mortality and what the future holds for the next generation.

== Music video ==
The music video directed by Danny Clinch was released on September 18, 2013.

== Personnel ==
Pearl Jam

- Eddie Vedder - lead vocals
- Mike McCready - guitar
- Stone Gossard - guitar
- Jeff Ament - bass guitar
- Matt Cameron - drums, backing vocals

Additional musician

- Boom Gaspar - keyboards

== Charts ==
=== Weekly charts ===
Weekly chart performance
Chart (2013–24)	Peak position
Australia (ARIA)	60
Austria (Ö3 Austria Top 40)	63
Belgium (Ultratop 50 Flanders)	21
Belgium (Ultratop 50 Wallonia)	49
Canada Hot 100 (Billboard)	31
Canada Rock (Billboard)	1
Finland Airplay (Radiosoittolista)	44
France (SNEP)	135
Germany (GfK)	86
Ireland (IRMA)	27
Italy (FIMI)	14
Netherlands (Single Top 100)	42
New Zealand (Recorded Music NZ)	36
Spain (Promusicae)	28
Switzerland (Schweizer Hitparade)	49
US Billboard Hot 100	76
US Adult Pop Airplay (Billboard)	34
US Hot Rock & Alternative Songs (Billboard)	11
US Rock & Alternative Airplay (Billboard)	4

=== Year-end charts ===
Year-end chart performance
Chart (2013)	Position
US Hot Rock Songs (Billboard)	54

Chart (2014)	Position
US Hot Rock Songs (Billboard)	71
US Rock Airplay (Billboard)	22

== Certifications ==
Certifications and sales
Region	Certification	Certified units/sales
Brazil (Pro-Música Brasil)	Platinum	60,000^{‡}
New Zealand (RMNZ)	Gold	15,000^{‡}
^{‡} Sales+streaming figures based on certification alone.

== Release history ==
Release dates and formats
Region	Date	Format	Label
Worldwide	September 18, 2013	Digital download	Monkeywrench
