= Pearl Jam 2016 North America Tour =

2016 concert tour by Pearl Jam

- Tour by Pearl Jam
- Location: North America
- Associated album: Lightning Bolt
- Start date: April 8, 2016
- End date: August 22, 2016
- Legs: 2
- No. of shows: 26 (1 cancelled)

Pearl Jam concert chronology
- Pearl Jam 2015 Latin America Tour (2015); Pearl Jam 2016 North America Tour (2016); Pearl Jam 2018 Tour (2018)

The Pearl Jam 2016 North America Tour was a concert tour by the American rock band Pearl Jam. The tour consisted of twenty-six shows in the United States and Canada, including appearances at the New Orleans Jazz Festival and the Bonnaroo Music Festival. This was the band's first tour following the Latin American Tour that finished in 2015.

The first leg of the tour started on April 8 in Sunrise, Florida and finished on May 12 in Toronto. The band then played at the Bonnaroo Festival in June, before playing two shows at Fenway Park, Boston and two shows at Wrigley Field, Chicago in August. Additional festival appearances at the Ride Festival and the Pemberton Music Festival in July were announced after the arena dates had been published.

Rolling Stone listed the tour as one of the 20 hottest tours of 2016. Music website Alternative Nation named it as the greatest Pearl Jam tour to date.

The two shows at Wrigley Field grossed more than $5.7 million, finishing as the 50th-highest-grossing concerts in 2016. The tour was the 45th-highest-grossing tour in North America and the 64th-highest-grossing tour in the world for 2016.

== History ==
The tour started on April 8 at the BB&T Center in Sunrise, a venue the band had not played at before. In Miami the band covered Cat Power's song "Good Woman" for the first time. Chris Joseph writing for the Miami New Times described the show as "emotional, visceral, honest, droll, raw, heartfelt, and political". The tour continued with two more dates in Florida, including the band's first ever show in Jacksonville. On April 16 at the Bon Secours Wellness Arena in Greenville, South Carolina, the band played the whole of their second album, "Vs.", for the first time during the show.

On April 18 the band announced that they will not be playing their previously scheduled show in Raleigh on April 20 due to the controversial Public Facilities Privacy & Security Act (also known as House Bill 2). Frontman Eddie Vedder addressed the crowd at the Hampton show about the cancellation in Raleigh saying "It was a hard process because we thought we could still play and make things right and we could fortify all the people on the ground working to repeal this despicable law". Bruce Springsteen and Ringo Starr also cancelled concerts in North Carolina in protest of the bill. At the concert in Columbia, Vedder called out Senator Lee Bright, who is also proposing a bill similar to HB2. At the same show, Pearl Jam paid tribute to Prince, who had died earlier that day, with Vedder saying "Prince was probably the greatest guitar player we've ever seen" before playing a snippet of "Purple Rain".

Midway through the first leg of arena shows, Pearl Jam headlined the New Orleans Jazz & Heritage Festival, playing for two hours and fifteen minutes, the longest set of the festival. Again, the band paid tribute to Prince before playing their song "Even Flow", a track Prince had covered live on his Live Out Loud Tour in 2013. They finished their set at the festival with a cover of Neil Young's song "Rockin' in the Free World" and were joined onstage with Josh Klinghoffer and Chad Smith of the Red Hot Chili Peppers and Nathan Followill of Kings of Leon.

The US part of the first leg concluded with Pearl Jam playing two sold-out shows in Philadelphia and two sold-out shows in New York City. At the second Philadelphia show, the band started the night by playing the whole of their debut album, "Ten", in order. At the second show in New York City at Madison Square Garden, the band were first joined onstage with Rick Nielsen and Tom Petersson of Cheap Trick to perform Cheap Trick's song "Surrender". Later that night, Sting joined Pearl Jam onstage, with them playing "Driven to Tears" by The Police.

Pearl Jam then played four shows in Canada, starting with the Videotron Centre in Quebec City. Originally the band were scheduled to play two consecutive nights in Toronto at the Air Canada Centre, but the second date was moved back one day to May 12 because of the NBA Playoff match with the Toronto Raptors. On May 10 at the first show in Toronto, the band played the whole of their sixth studio album "Binaural" in order as part of the set. During the encores for both shows in Toronto, the band were joined onstage with Donna Grantis of 3rdeyegirl.

Two days prior to their show at the Bonnaroo Music Festival, Pearl Jam played a surprise show at Third Man Records in Nashville, Tennessee. During the performance, they were joined onstage by the label's founder, Jack White. At Bonnaroo, the band's start time was delayed due to severe weather. On July 9 at the Ride Festival, Pearl Jam played the song "Angel" for the first time since 1994. At the Pemberton Music Festival on July 17, Pearl Jam covered "Dream Baby Dream" by Suicide in tribute to Alan Vega who died two days earlier.

In August the band played two shows at Fenway Park in Boston. On the first night they covered Aerosmith's song "Draw the Line" for the first time. At the second Boston show, they again covered "Draw the Line", this time with Aerosmith's bassist Tom Hamilton joining the band. Later the same month, they concluded the tour by playing two shows at Wrigley Field. At their second Wrigley show, they were joined onstage with Dennis Rodman while the band played the song "Black, Red, Yellow".

== Tour dates ==
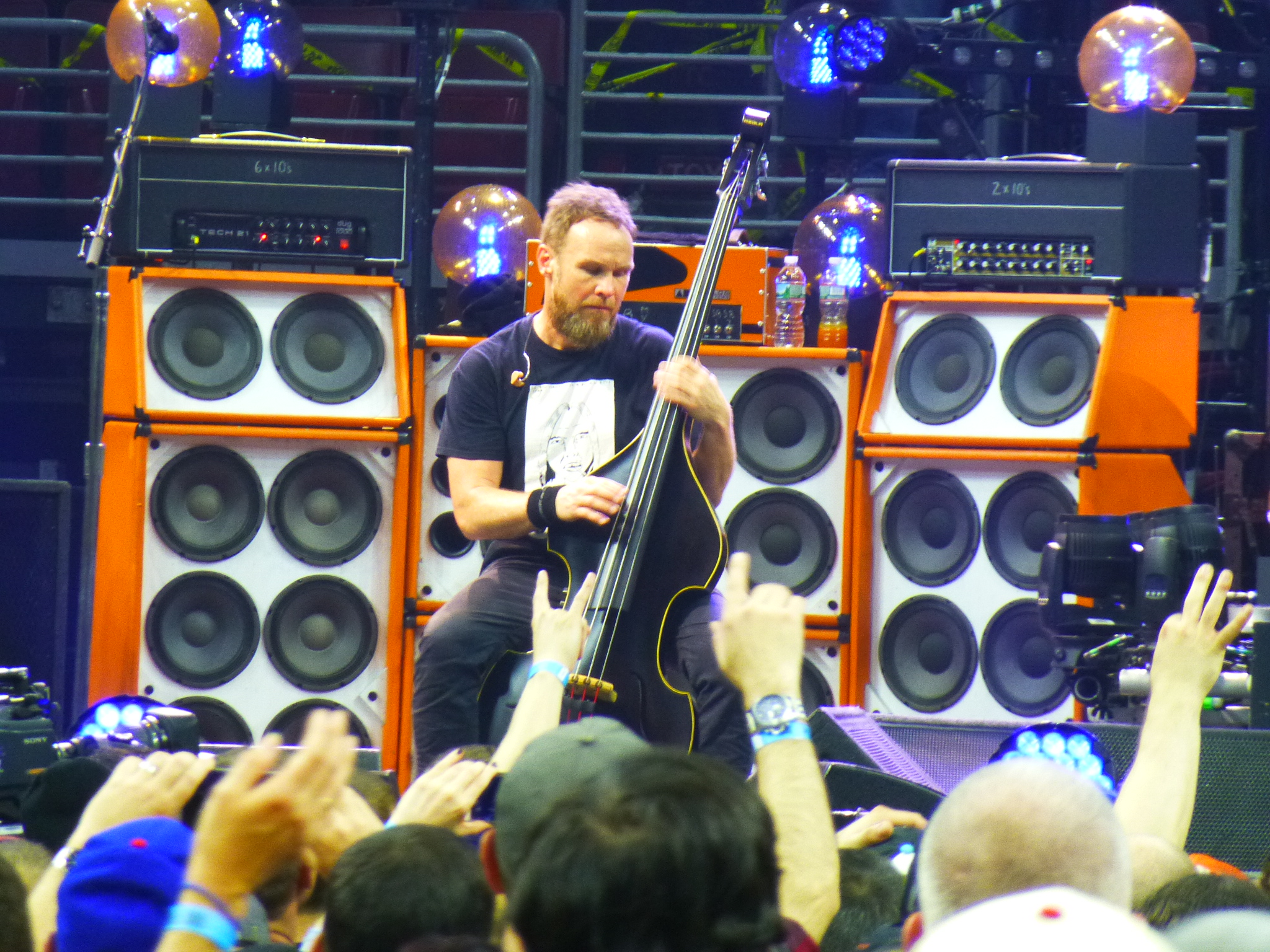
Bassist Jeff Ament at the Wells Fargo Center, Philadelphia on April 28, 2016

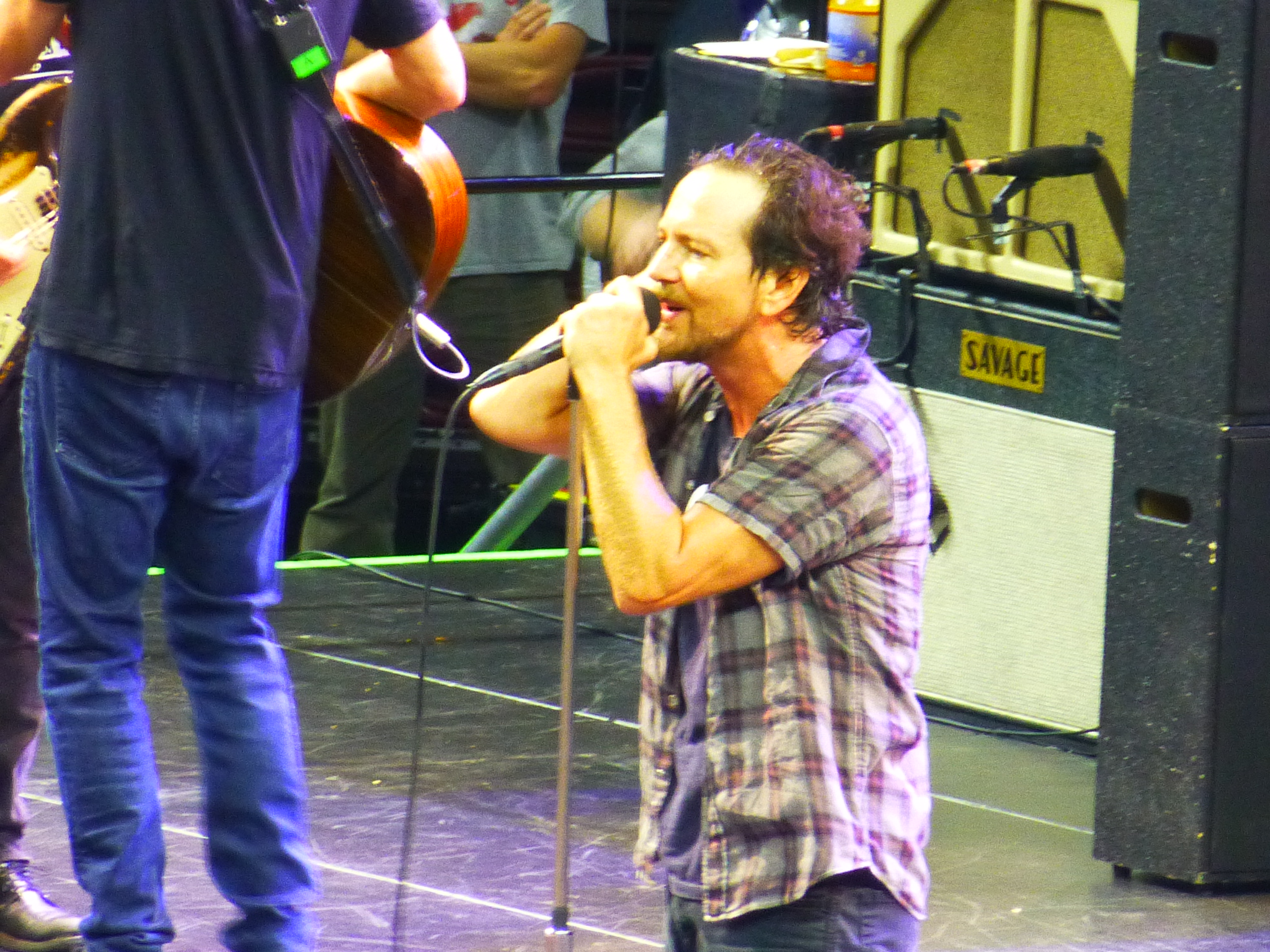
Frontman Eddie Vedder at the Wells Fargo Center, Philadelphia on April 29, 2016

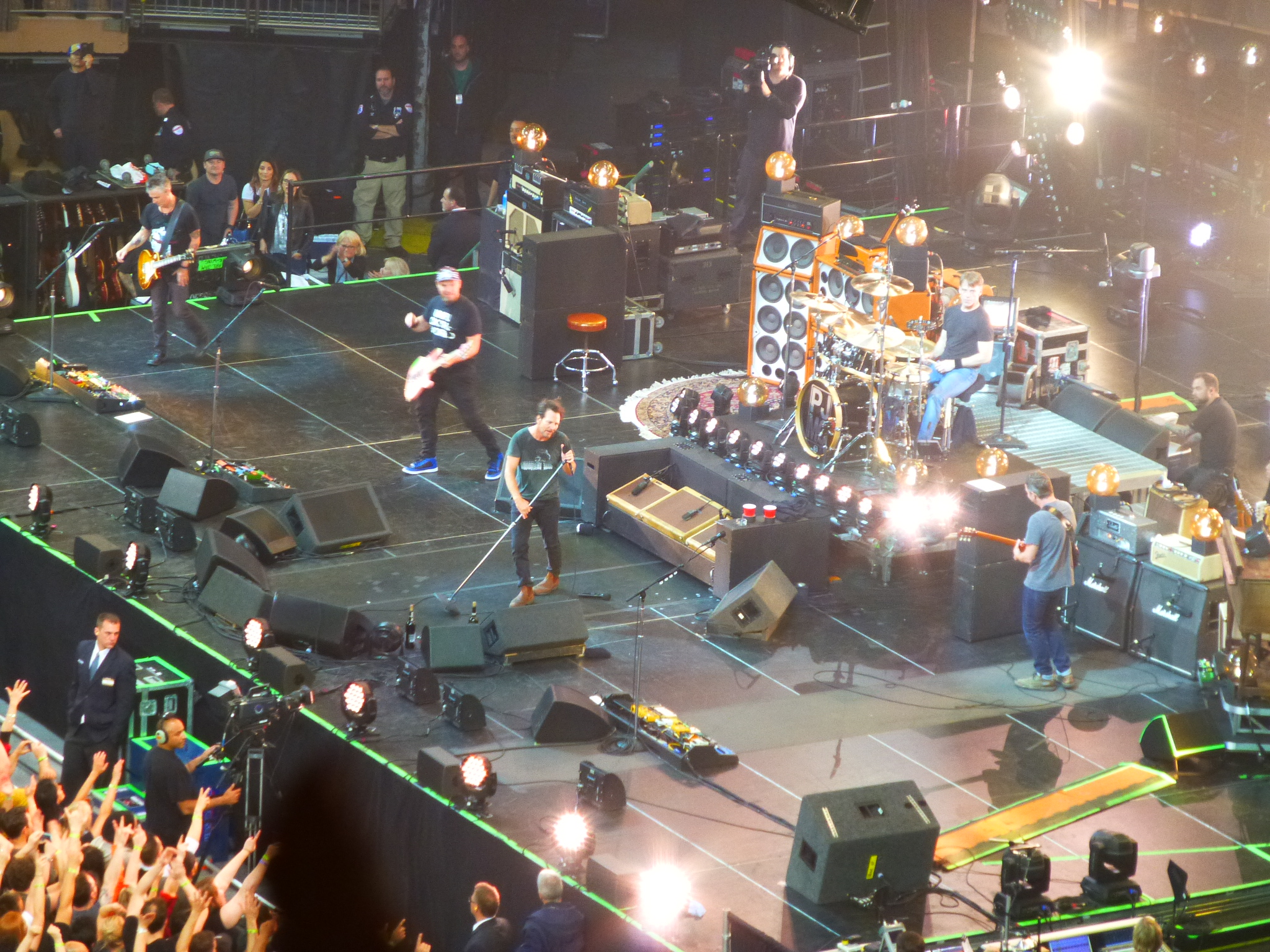
Pearl Jam at Madison Square Garden, New York City on May 1, 2016

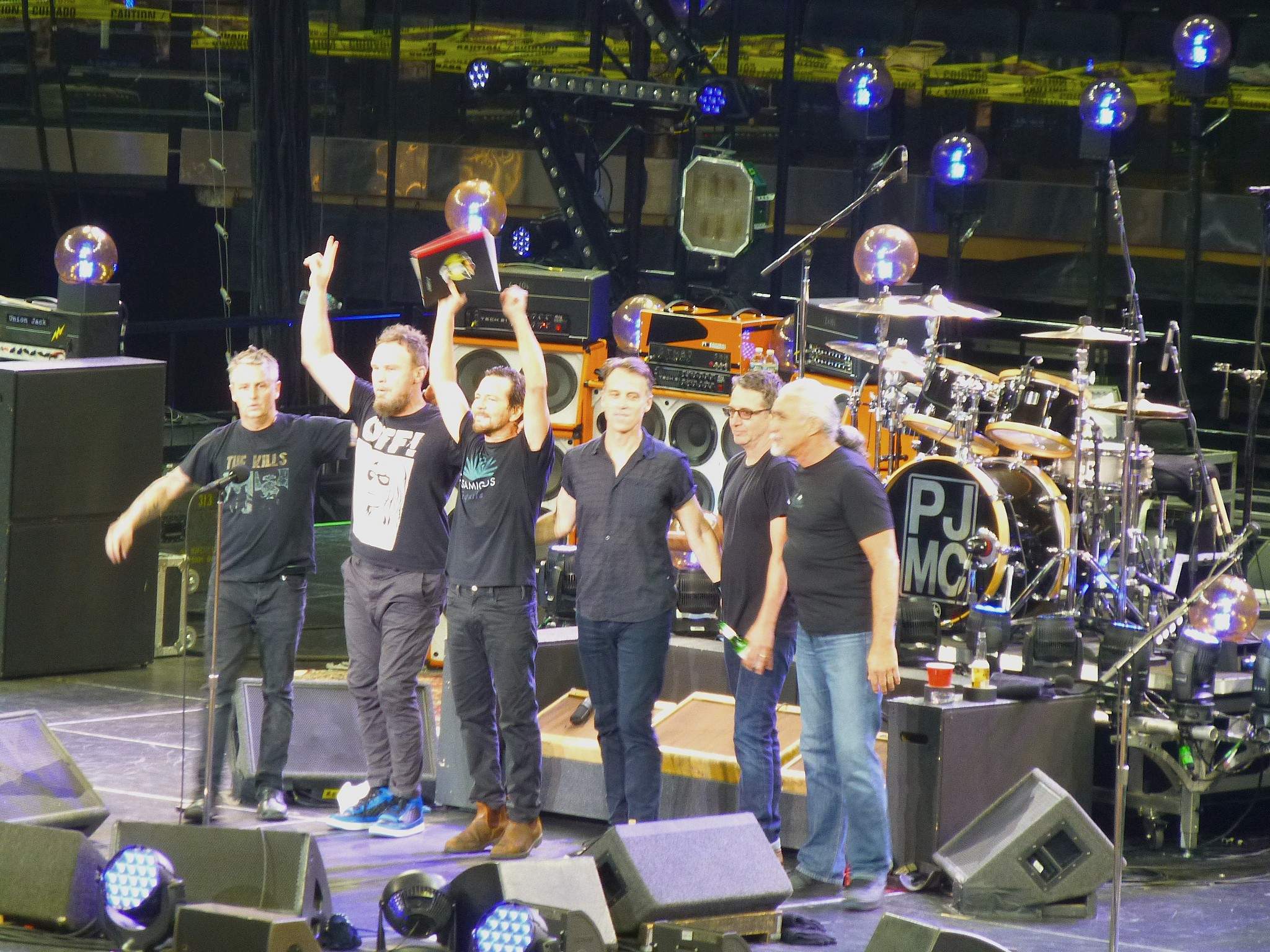
Pearl Jam at Madison Square Garden, New York City on May 2, 2016

Date	City	Country	Venue
Leg 1
April 8, 2016	Sunrise	United States	BB&T Center
April 9, 2016	Miami	United States	American Airlines Arena
April 11, 2016	Tampa	United States	Amalie Arena
April 13, 2016	Jacksonville	United States	Jacksonville Veterans Memorial Arena
April 16, 2016	Greenville	United States	Bon Secours Wellness Arena
April 18, 2016	Hampton	United States	Hampton Coliseum
~~April 20, 2016^{[A]}~~	~~Raleigh~~	United States	~~PNC Arena~~ (Cancelled in response to HB2)
April 21, 2016	Columbia	United States	Colonial Life Arena
April 23, 2016	New Orleans	United States	New Orleans Jazz & Heritage Festival
April 26, 2016	Lexington	United States	Rupp Arena
April 28, 2016	Philadelphia	United States	Wells Fargo Center
April 29, 2016	Philadelphia	United States	Wells Fargo Center
May 1, 2016	New York City	United States	Madison Square Garden
May 2, 2016	New York City	United States	Madison Square Garden
May 5, 2016	Quebec City	Canada	Videotron Centre
May 8, 2016	Ottawa	Canada	Canadian Tire Centre
May 10, 2016	Toronto	Canada	Air Canada Centre
May 12, 2016^{[B]}	Toronto	Canada	Air Canada Centre
Leg 2
June 9, 2016^{[C]}	Nashville	United States	Third Man Records
June 11, 2016^{[D]}	Manchester	United States	Great Stage Park
July 9, 2016^{[E]}	Telluride	United States	Ride Festival
July 17, 2016^{[F]}	Pemberton	Canada	Mount Currie
August 5, 2016	Boston	United States	Fenway Park
August 7, 2016	Boston	United States	Fenway Park
August 20, 2016	Chicago	United States	Wrigley Field
August 22, 2016	Chicago	United States	Wrigley Field

Notes

^{A} This concert was cancelled.
^{B} This concert was originally scheduled for May 11.
^{C} This concert was a surprise show.
^{D} This concert is part of the Bonnaroo Music Festival at Great Stage Park in Manchester, Tennessee.
^{E} This concert is part of the Ride Festival at Telluride Town Park in Telluride, Colorado.
^{F} This concert is part of the Pemberton Music Festival at Pemberton, British Columbia.

== Band members ==
Pearl Jam

- Jeff Ament – bass guitar
- Stone Gossard – rhythm guitar
- Mike McCready – lead guitar
- Eddie Vedder – lead vocals, guitar
- Matt Cameron – drums

Additional musicians

- Boom Gaspar – Hammond B3 and keyboards
