= Huka Entertainment =

Huka Entertainment and Tortuga Music Festival
- Formation: 2005
- Location: New Orleans, LA
- Executives: Evan Harrison, AJ Niland

Huka Entertainment is a music festival producer and promoter based in New Orleans, Louisiana. Starting with Hangout Music Festival, the company's festivals now include Tortuga Music Festival, BUKU Music + Art Project, and Hell Yes Fest. Huka Entertainment also has a concerts department spanning the southern and eastern coast of the United States. In October 2015, concert industry publication Pollstar listed Huka Entertainment among the top 50 concert promoters worldwide, based on ticket sales.

== History ==
Huka Entertainment was founded in 2005 by co-founders A.J. Niland and Bennett Drago after they promoted local shows around the Mobile area in Alabama. In 2010 the company held the first annual Hangout Music Festival, followed by a free Concerts for the Coast concert series featuring Jimmy Buffett, Bon Jovi and others in response to the BP Oil Spill disaster. Following the Hangout Music Festival, Huka Entertainment launched Tortuga Music Festival with co-founders Rock The Ocean Foundation, and also began co-producing the BUKU Music + Art Project alongside Winter Circle Productions. In 2014, the company announced they would bring the multi-genre Pemberton Music Festival to Pemberton in British Columbia, just north of Canadian resort-town, Whistler. That year the company promoted shows in New Orleans, Baton Rouge, Houston, Mobile, AL, Wilmington, NC and others. In 2015, former Clear Channel executive Evan Harrison joined as CEO.

== Hangout Music Festival ==
The Hangout Music Festival is an annual three-day music festival held at the public beaches of Gulf Shores, Alabama. It was co-founded by Huka Entertainment in 2010 and was produced by Huka Entertainment through 2013. The event features many genres of music, including rock, indie, hip hop, and electronic dance music. The festival generally takes place on the third weekend in May. It is the first major music festival held on the beach in the city.

== Tortuga Music Festival ==
Rock the Ocean’s Tortuga Music Festival
- Locations: Fort Lauderdale, FL, United States

Rock the Ocean’s Tortuga Music Festival is an annual music festival that takes place at Fort Lauderdale Beach Park in Fort Lauderdale, Florida. Founded by Huka Entertainment and the Rock The Ocean Foundation, the annual spring festival aims to raise awareness and support for ocean conservation. Over $250,000 was raised for ocean conservation efforts.

The festival features multiple stages of live entertainment with a focus on country, rock and a variety of roots music. Past performers have included Zac Brown Band, Luke Bryan, Eric Church, Kenny Chesney, Lynyrd Skynyrd and more. The 2016 edition of the festival expanded to 3 days, announcing Blake Shelton, Tim McGraw, and Dierks Bentley as headliners each day.

== BUKU Music + Art Project ==
BUKU Music + Art Project is a New Orleans based two-day music and arts festival produced by Huka Entertainment and Winter Circle Productions and held annually at Mardi Gras World. BUKU combines international musicians with local food vendors, local visual artists, and various pop-up street performers throughout the site. BUKU has included a mix of electronic dance music, hip hop music, and indie rock featuring past performances by Skrillex, Ellie Goulding, Kid Cudi, Bassnectar, The Flaming Lips, Calvin Harris, Kendrick Lamar, A$AP Rocky, Passion Pit, Nas, Explosions in the Sky, Major Lazer, Alt-J, TV on the Radio, Chromeo, Flux Pavilion, Flosstradamus, Sleigh Bells, Earl Sweatshirt, Porter Robinson, Die Antwoord, RL Grime, Seth Troxler, Purity Ring, Jamie Jones and dozens of others.

== Concerts ==
Huka Entertainment has promoted and produced concerts of various sizes throughout the span of the company. Huka Entertainment venues include the Saenger Theatre (Mobile, Alabama), Brooklyn Arts Center (Wilmington, North Carolina), Warehouse Live (Houston, Texas), Joy Theatre (New Orleans, Louisiana), Greenfield Lake Amphitheatre (Wilmington, North Carolina), Publiq House (New Orleans, Louisiana), and more.

== Former Promotions ==
Pemberton Music Festival was an annual four-day music festival that took place near Mount Currie in Pemberton, British Columbia. Produced by Huka Entertainment, the event took place in July from 2014 to 2016. The festival featured multiple stages of live entertainment, including rock, indie rock, hip hop, electronic, heavy metal, and comedy. On May 18, 2017, the festival announced the festival was cancelled and had filed for bankruptcy.
