= Stadio Euganeo =

Multipurpose stadium in Padua, Italy

Coordinates: 45°25′56″N 11°51′30″E

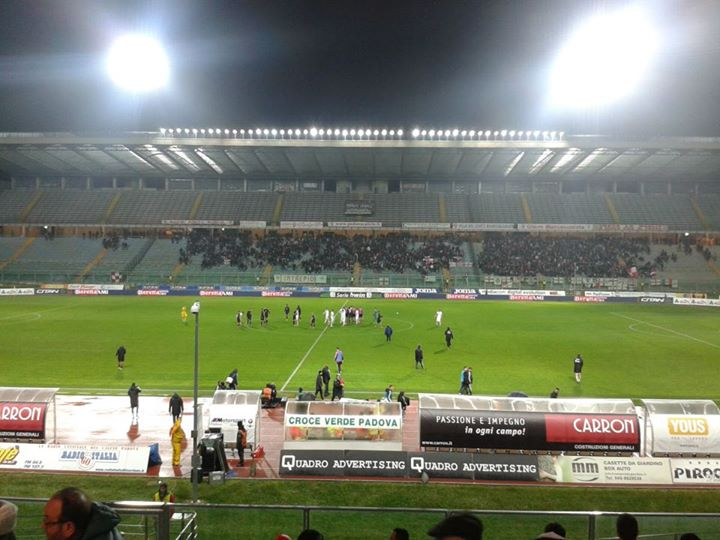
- Interactive map of Stadio Euganeo
- Location: Padua, Italy
- Owner: Municipality of Padua
- Capacity: 32,420
- Surface: Grass; 105x67m

Construction
- Opened: 1994

Tenants
- Padova (1994–present); Cittadella (2000–2002); Treviso (2005); Atletico San Paolo Padova (2010, 2014–2015); Italy national football team (selected matches)

Stadio Euganeo is a multipurpose stadium located in Padua, Italy. Primarily used for football, it is also used for athletics events, concerts, rugby league and rugby union matches. The stadium replaced the old and historically significant Appiani stadium.

From 1994 to the present, it has served as the home stadium for Calcio Padova. It has a total capacity of 32,420 spectators.

Due to strict Italian laws regarding security measures for football matches, the capacity of Stadio Euganeo can be reduced to 18,060 people specifically for football events.

Stadio Euganeo also temporarily hosted Treviso for their initial matches in Serie A in the 2005–06 season, as their ground, Stadio Omobono Tenni, was deemed unfit. It also served as the temporary home for Cittadella during their first two Serie B championships in the 2000–01 and 2001–02 seasons.

By the 2010–2011 season, it was also used for the home matches of San Paolo Padova, the city's second football team, competing in Serie D.

Stadio Euganeo hosted the international rugby match between Italy and Australia on 8 November 2008, which ended with a score of 20–30 in favor of Australia. The match drew an attendance of approximately 30,000 people, likely making it the most attended rugby match in Italy at that time.

On 22 November 2014, it hosted Italy's end-of-year rugby union international against South Africa, with South Africa winning with a score of 22–6.

The original Stadio Euganeo had previously hosted a rugby league international match between Italy and Australia on 23 January 1960. This match was part of the 1959-60 Kangaroo tour of Great Britain and France. The Kangaroos defeated the home side with a score of 37–15 in front of a modest crowd of 3,500 curious fans.

== Concerts ==
Date	Performer	Tour
27 June 2001	Bon Jovi	One Wild Night Tour
29 June 2004	Metallica	Madly in Anger with the World Tour
31 May 2013	Bruce Springsteen	Wrecking Ball World Tour
26 July 2013	Roger Waters	The Wall Live
24 June 2018	Pearl Jam	Pearl Jam 2018 Tour
1 July 2023	Rammstein	Europe Stadium Tour
13 July 2025	Iron Maiden	Run For Your Lives World Tour
