= Pemberton Music Festival =

2014 music festival in Canada

- Genre: rock, indie rock, hip hop, electronic, heavy metal, comedy
- Locations: Pemberton, BC, Canada
- Years active: 2014–2016
- Founders: HUKA Entertainment
- Website: pembertonmusicfestival.com

Pemberton Music Festival was a four-day music festival that took place near Mount Currie in Pemberton, British Columbia. Produced by Huka Entertainment, the 2016 event took place on July 14–17. The festival features multiple stages of live entertainment, including rock, indie rock, hip hop, electronic, heavy metal, and comedy.

On April 28, 2017, HUKA Entertainment announced the 2017 lineup. It was to include Chance The Rapper, Muse, A Tribe Called Quest, Major Lazer, Run the Jewels, HAIM, Big Sean and others.

On May 18, 2017, it was announced the festival was cancelled and it had filed for bankruptcy. Ernst & Young were appointed as the 'Trustee in Bankruptcy'. Rising costs from the lower Canadian dollar and ticket sales were factors in the decision to file. Ticket holders and creditors were not expected to get a full refund or payment. They will be creditors in the bankruptcy.

== 2014 lineup ==
- Nine Inch Nails
- Outkast
- Deadmau5
- Soundgarden
- Frank Ocean
- Kendrick Lamar
- Metric
- Modest Mouse
- Snoop Dogg
- Chance the Rapper
- Above & Beyond
- Empire of the Sun
- Grimes
- The Flaming Lips
- Blondie
- Cage the Elephant
- Girl Talk
- TV on the Radio
- Young the Giant
- Baauer
- Randy Newman
- Matthew Good
- Schoolboy Q
- St. Vincent
- Tyler, The Creator
- Violent Femmes
- Earl Sweatshirt
- Gord Downie, the Sadies
- The New Pornographers
- Sloan
- Stars
- Best Coast
- Big Gigantic
- Clockwork
- Flying Lotus
- Hayden
- Matt Mays
- RL Grime
- Shlohmo
- Delta Rae
- Dinosaur Jr.
- Fucked up
- Griz
- Hey Rosetta!
- Kaytranada
- Cashmere Cat
- Purity Ring (Dj Set)
- XXYYXX
- Dan Deacon
- Lettuce
- Metz
- Rich Aucoin
- Wild Belle
- ZZ Ward
- Aer
- The Boom Booms
- Gold & Youth
- Flash Lightnin’
- The Tontons
- Tory Lanez
- Yukon Blonde
- Hallelujah Train Feat. Daniel Lanois, Pastor Brady Blade, Brian Blade, Brady Blade Jr., Anders Osborne, Will Sexton, Chris Thomas, Malcolm Burn with Gospel Choir
- Trailer Park Boys
- Bob Saget
- Lisa Lampanelli
- Nick Swardson
- Norm Macdonald
- Doug Benson
- Hannibal Buress
- Tom Green
- Brian Posehn
- Jim Breuer
- Natasha Leggero
- Brian Scolaro
- Kyle Dunnigan
- Justice (band)

== 2015 lineup ==
- Kendrick Lamar
- The Black Keys
- J. Cole
- Tiësto
- Hozier
- Kid Cudi
- Missy Elliott
- Weezer
- Jane's Addiction
- The String Cheese Incident
- Bassnectar
- Passion Pit
- Billy Talent
- Chromeo
- Dada Life
- Sam Roberts Band
- The Decemberists
- The War on Drugs
- Edward Sharpe & the Magnetic Zeros
- Portugal. the Man
- PARTYNEXTDOOR
- Chvrches
- Chet Faker
- Beirut
- RL Grime
- Banks
- De La Soul
- STS9
- Duke Dumont
- Matt and Kim
- Earl Sweatshirt
- Flux Pavilion
- Dan Mangan + Blacksmith
- Father John Misty
- Galactic featuring Macy Gray
- Run the Jewels
- Paul Oakenfold
- Courtney Barnett
- Cut Copy
- Bleachers
- Ryn Weaver
- Logic
- Tobias Jesso Jr.
- Real Estate
- Preservation Hall Jazz Band
- Flatbush Zombies
- Yung Lean
- Givers
- Moon Taxi
- Ryan Hemsworth
- July Talk
- BADBADNOTGOOD
- Charles Bradley & his Extraordinaires
- Judah & the Lion
- Gay Nineties
- What So Not
- Beats Antique
- Kali Uchis
- Spooky Black (Corbin)
- The Suffers
- Giraffage
- DJ Dodger Stadium
- Bas
- Sango
- JackLNDN
- PPL MVR
- Boyfriend (rapper)
- Maggie Koerner
- Full Flex Express featuring Jack U Skrillex + Diplo, Zeds Dead, A$AP Ferg, Tycho, Hundred Waters, & Anna Lunoe B2B MIJA
- Tim & Eric
- Reggie Watts
- T. J. Miller
- Doug Benson
- Eric Andre
- Harland Williams
- Tig Notaro
- Ali Wong
- Ben Gleib
- Gorburger
- Chris Trew
- Air Sex Championships

Later added:

- Broken Social Scene
- Ludacris
- Alice Cooper
- G-Eazy
- Shakey Graves
- Zhu
- Tune-Yards
- The Glorious Sons
- Post Malone
- Apollo
- Basecamp
- Allie X
- Hey Marseilles
- JPNSGRLS
- Letts
- Pomo
- Lovecoast
- Dakota Pearl
- Will Ross Band
- Nick Offerman
- Tim Heidecker
- Neil Hamburger
- Dino Archie
- Ivan Decker

== 2016 lineup ==
- Pearl Jam
- The Killers
- J. Cole
- Snoop Dogg
- Kaskade
- Wiz Khalifa
- Bassnectar
- Ice Cube
- Halsey
- FKA Twigs
- DJ Snake
- Billy Idol
- The Chainsmokers
- Noel Gallagher's High Flying Birds
- Steve Angello
- Flosstradamus
- Miguel
- Purity Ring
- Jesse Roper
- Die Antwoord
- Tyler, the Creator
- Vince Staples
- Cypress Hill
- Hippie Sabotage*
- Rich Aucoin
- Mastodon
- Arkells
- Wolf Parade
- Cold War Kids
- Thievery Corporation
- Girl Talk
- Lance Herbstrong
- YG
- Baauer
- Mickey Blue
- Tory Lanez
- Big Gigantic
- Grace Potter
- Børns
- Method Man and Redman
- Rae Sremmurd
- Datsik
- Coleman Hell
- Kehlani
- Ra Ra Riot
- Wintersleep
- Savages
- Joey Bada$$
- Keys n Krates
- Robert Delong
- SZA
- Jon Bellion
- Protoje
- Anderson Paak & the Free Nationals
- Lido
- Hudson Mohawke
- Givers
- Kaleo
- Diiv
- White Denim
- Allen Stone
- Bully
- Hucci
- Mark Farina
- Lunice
- Bas
- Trill Sammy X Dice Soho
- Braids
- The Glorious Sons
- Hippie Sabotage
- Shawn Hook
- Miami Horror
- Stick Figure
- The Funk Hunters
- The Zolas
- The Elwins
- The London Souls
- Etsa
- Chrome Sparks
- Dizzy Wright
- Jahkoy
- Pell (musician)
- The Internet
- Jak Knight
- Quaker City Night Hawks

== 2017 lineup ==
The 2017 festival was cancelled. This was the proposed lineup.

- Chance The Rapper
- Muse
- A Tribe Called Quest
- Major Lazer
- HAIM
- Run The Jewels
- Marshmello
- Diplo
- Big Sean
- Ween
- Alesso
- Logic
- Tegan & Sara
- MGMT
- Future Islands
- Zeds Dead
- Migos
- Carnage
- Lil Uzi Vert
- Nathaniel Rateliff & The Night Sweats
- Slightly Stoopid
- Ben Harper & The Innocent Criminals
- GRiZ
- Nelly
- Rebelution
- Lil Yachty
- Deorro
- A Tribe Called Red
- Majid Jordan
- Local Natives
- Khalid
- Eagles of Death Metal
- The Avalanches
- Bob Moses
- July Talk
- Joey Bada$$
- 6lack
- Aminé
- Thundercat
- Cashmere Cat
- Shovels & Rope
- The Rural Alberta Advantage
- Noname
- Leithauser
- Denzel Curry
- Lecrae
- Said The Whale
- Pup
- Giraffage
- Pvris
- Boyfriend
- Dirty Radio
- Tennyson
- Marcus King Band
- Kilo Kish
- Tasha the Amazon
- A. Chal
- Hundred Waters
