= Gigaton Tour =

2022–2023 concert tour by Pearl Jam

- Tour by Pearl Jam
- Location: Europe; North America
- Associated album: Gigaton
- Start date: May 3, 2022
- End date: September 19, 2023
- Legs: 4
- No. of shows: 41

Pearl Jam concert chronology
- Pearl Jam 2018 Tour (2018); Gigaton Tour (2022–23); Dark Matter World Tour (2024–25)

The Gigaton Tour was a concert tour by the American rock band Pearl Jam. It was the band's first tour since 2018.

The tour was originally scheduled to consist of seventeen shows in North America, and fourteen shows in Europe during 2020. However, on March 9, 2020, the band announced that the first leg of North American shows would be postponed due to the COVID-19 pandemic, with the aim to reschedule them for a later date. On April 10, 2020, Pearl Jam announced that the European leg had been postponed until June/July 2021, also due to the COVID-19 pandemic. On July 23, 2020, Pearl Jam announced rescheduled dates for the European leg in the summer of 2021. On October 5, 2020, two dates at BST Hyde Park in London, England were also announced. However, on March 30, 2021, the band confirmed that the planned shows for 2021 had been pushed back to 2022 due to the pandemic. On November 16, 2021, the band posted an announcement on their website stating that North American tour would start in May 2022.

== History ==
=== Original 2020 plans ===
The North American leg of the tour was going to coincide with the release of the band's eleventh studio album, Gigaton. The first show would have taken place in Toronto, with the leg concluding with two shows in Oakland. Prior to the first show in the United States, the band were due to play at the Apollo Theater in New York City. It would have been an invitation-only show, for SiriusXM listeners and subscribers to Pandora.

Pixies, IDLES and White Reaper were announced as supporting the band across the dates in Europe 2020. The 2020 European leg was also scheduled to include several indoor shows, as well as outdoor festival shows at Rock Werchter, Lollapalooza in Stockholm and Paris, and the BST Hyde Park concert in London. The show at the Royal Arena in Copenhagen would have been on the eve of the 20th anniversary of the Roskilde tragedy. However, on April 8, 2020, the show in London was cancelled due to the coronavirus pandemic.

=== Leg 1, United States (2022) ===
The rescheduled tour started on May 3, 2022, at Viejas Arena in San Diego, with the band paying tribute to Taylor Hawkins, who had died in March 2022. Four nights later, at Pearl Jam's second show at the Kia Forum in Inglewood, California, drummer Matt Cameron led the band with a cover of the Foo Fighters' song "Cold Day in the Sun", which featured Hawkins on vocals. However, Cameron would miss the next few shows after he tested positive for COVID-19, the first shows he had missed since joining the band in 1998. For the two shows at the Oakland Arena, Richard Stuverud and Josh Klinghoffer played the drums each night in Cameron's absence. On May 16, 2022 in Fresno, Stuverud and Klinghoffer continued to fill in for Cameron, along with the band's original drummer Dave Krusen. Krusen played on the songs from Ten during the night, the first time he had played multiple songs with the band since he left in 1991. The final two shows of the Spring tour, in Sacramento and Las Vegas, were both cancelled after bassist Jeff Ament also tested positive for COVID-19.

=== Leg 2, Europe (2022) ===
The European leg of the tour started on June 18, 2022, with Pearl Jam headlining the Pinkpop Festival in the Netherlands. The tour continued, including shows in Berlin, Zürich and Werchter. In between playing the Lollapalooza festival in Sweden and France, Pearl Jam also played two back-to-back shows at BST Hyde Park in London, England. The band were scheduled to play at the Wiener Stadthalle in Vienna on July 20, 2022. However, lead singer Eddie Vedder damaged his throat from the impact of playing outdoors in Paris, due to the heat, dust and the smoke from nearby wildfires, with the show being cancelled. The following show at the O2 Arena in Prague was also cancelled for the same reason. The final shows of the European tour were scheduled to be two nights at the Ziggo Dome in Amsterdam. The first show was cancelled due to Vedder's voice problems, but the second night went ahead as scheduled. The final show started with acoustic songs. Later in the set, Stone Gossard sang lead vocals on "Mankind", Matt Cameron sang on a cover of "Black Diamond" by Kiss, and Josh Klinghoffer sang on a cover of Prince's "Purple Rain".

=== Leg 3, North America (2022) ===
In September 2022, Pearl Jam returned to North America, performing shows in Canada and the United States that had originally been scheduled for 2020. This leg included new dates in Camden and Louisville that had not been part of the original 2020 plans. Highlights from this leg included Pearl Jam's first-ever performance at the Apollo Theater as well as a Madison Square Garden show on the 21st anniversary of the September 11, 2001 terrorist attacks.

=== Leg 4, United States (2023) ===
In April 2023, Pearl Jam announced nine additional United States shows to take place in August and September, 2023. This leg of the tour began with two shows at the Xcel Energy Center in Saint Paul, and concluded with two shows at the Moody Center in Austin. Deep Sea Diver opened the shows in Saint Paul and Fort Worth, while Inhaler opened in Chicago, and Austin. During the final show in Austin, Vedder mentioned that it would be the final show of the Gigaton Tour as their next album would be released the following year.

== Tour dates ==
The European dates were originally announced in July 2020, with a revised set of dates announced in March 2021, and a further update for the two Amsterdam shows announced in November 2021. In March 2022, the band announced new and rescheduled dates for May and September 2022. However, due to planned renovations at Royal Farms Arena, the band's previously announced Baltimore show was cancelled.

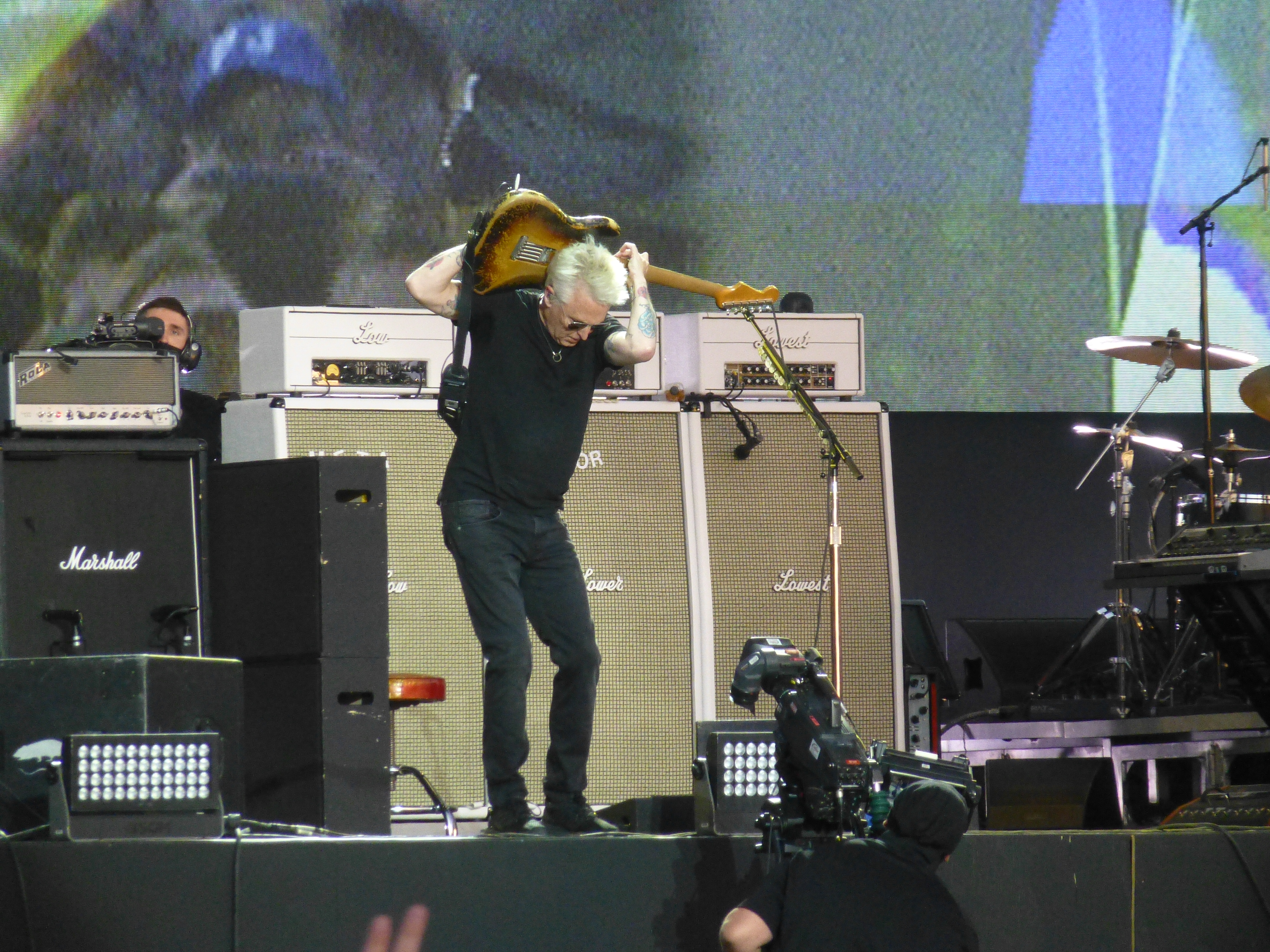
Guitarist Mike McCready at BST Hyde Park, London, on July 8, 2022

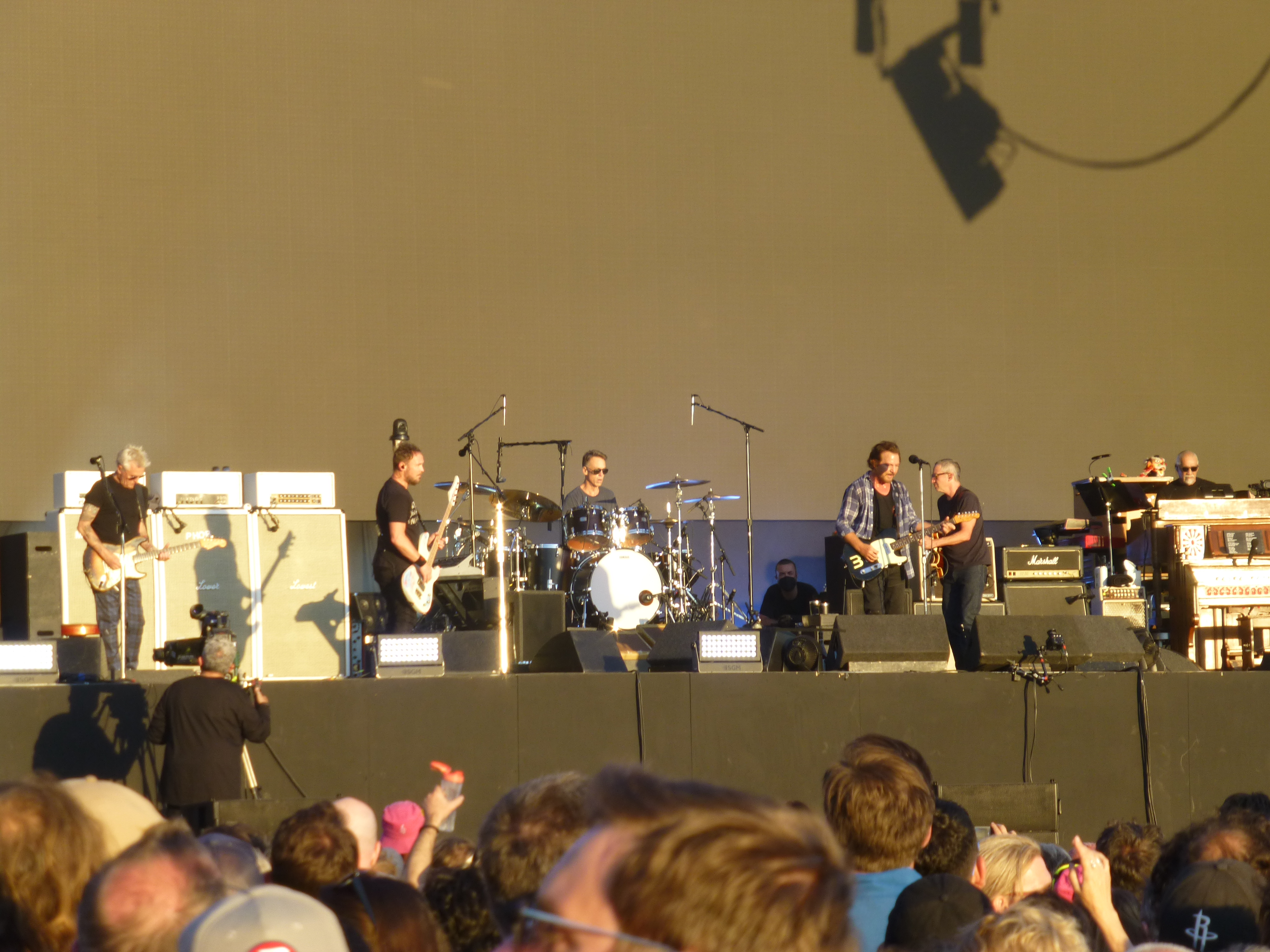
Pearl Jam at BST Hyde Park, London, on July 9, 2022

List of 2022 concerts
Date	City	Country	Venue
May 3, 2022	San Diego	United States	Viejas Arena
May 6, 2022	Inglewood	United States	Kia Forum
May 7, 2022	Inglewood	United States	Kia Forum
May 9, 2022	Glendale	United States	Gila River Arena
May 12, 2022	Oakland	United States	Oakland Arena
May 13, 2022	Oakland	United States	Oakland Arena
May 16, 2022	Fresno	United States	Save Mart Center
~~May 18, 2022~~	~~Sacramento~~	United States	~~Golden 1 Center~~ (Cancelled due to Matt and Jeff contracting COVID)
~~May 20, 2022~~	~~Las Vegas~~	United States	~~MGM Grand Garden Arena~~ (Cancelled due to Matt and Jeff contracting COVID)
June 18, 2022	Landgraaf	Netherlands	Pinkpop Festival
June 21, 2022	Berlin	Germany	Waldbühne
June 23, 2022	Zürich	Switzerland	Hallenstadion
June 25, 2022	Imola	Italy	Autodromo Enzo e Dino Ferrari
June 28, 2022	Frankfurt	Germany	Festhalle
June 30, 2022	Werchter	Belgium	Rock Werchter
July 3, 2022	Stockholm	Sweden	Lollapalooza
July 5, 2022	Copenhagen	Denmark	Royal Arena
July 8, 2022	London	England	BST Hyde Park
July 9, 2022	London	England	BST Hyde Park
July 12, 2022	Budapest	Hungary	Budapest Arena
July 14, 2022	Kraków	Poland	Tauron Arena
July 17, 2022	Paris	France	Lollapalooza
~~July 20, 2022~~	~~Vienna~~	~~Austria~~	~~Wiener Stadthalle~~ (Cancelled due to Vedder's throat problems)
~~July 22, 2022~~	~~Prague~~	~~Czechia~~	~~O2 Arena~~ (Cancelled due to Vedder's throat problems)
~~July 24, 2022~~	~~Amsterdam~~	~~Netherlands~~	~~Ziggo Dome~~ (Cancelled due to Vedder's throat problems)
July 25, 2022	Amsterdam	Netherlands	Ziggo Dome
September 1, 2022	Quebec City	Canada	Videotron Centre
September 3, 2022	Ottawa	Canada	Canadian Tire Centre
September 6, 2022	Hamilton	Canada	FirstOntario Centre
September 8, 2022	Toronto	Canada	Scotiabank Arena
September 10, 2022	New York City	United States	Apollo Theater
September 11, 2022	New York City	United States	Madison Square Garden
September 14, 2022	Camden	United States	Freedom Mortgage Pavilion
September 16, 2022	Nashville	United States	Bridgestone Arena
September 17, 2022	Louisville	United States	Kentucky Exposition Center
September 18, 2022	St. Louis	United States	Enterprise Center
September 20, 2022	Oklahoma City	United States	Paycom Center
September 22, 2022	Denver	United States	Ball Arena

List of 2023 concerts
Date	City	Country	Venue
August 31	Saint Paul	United States	Xcel Energy Center
September 2	Saint Paul	United States	Xcel Energy Center
September 5	Chicago	United States	United Center
September 7	Chicago	United States	United Center
~~September 10~~	~~Noblesville~~	United States	~~Ruoff Music Center~~ (Postponed to 2024 because of band Illness)
September 13	Fort Worth	United States	Dickies Arena
September 15	Fort Worth	United States	Dickies Arena
September 18	Austin	United States	Moody Center
September 19	Austin	United States	Moody Center

=== Original tour dates ===
Date	City	Country	Venue
March 18, 2020	Toronto	Canada	Scotiabank Arena
March 20, 2020	Ottawa	Canada	Canadian Tire Centre
March 22, 2020	Quebec City	Canada	Videotron Centre
March 24, 2020	Hamilton	Canada	FirstOntario Centre
March 26, 2020	New York City	United States	Apollo Theater
March 28, 2020	Baltimore	United States	Royal Farms Arena
March 30, 2020	New York City	United States	Madison Square Garden
April 2, 2020	Nashville	United States	Bridgestone Arena
April 4, 2020	St. Louis	United States	Enterprise Center
April 6, 2020	Oklahoma City	United States	Chesapeake Energy Arena
April 9, 2020	Denver	United States	Pepsi Center
April 11, 2020	Glendale	United States	Gila River Arena
April 13, 2020	San Diego	United States	Viejas Arena
April 15, 2020	Inglewood	United States	The Forum
April 16, 2020	Inglewood	United States	The Forum
April 18, 2020	Oakland	United States	Oakland Arena
April 19, 2020	Oakland	United States	Oakland Arena
June 23, 2020	Frankfurt	Germany	Festhalle
June 25, 2020	Berlin	Germany	Waldbühne
June 27, 2020	Stockholm	Sweden	Gärdet
June 29, 2020	Copenhagen	Denmark	Royal Arena
July 2, 2020	Werchter	Belgium	Rock Werchter
July 5, 2020	Imola	Italy	Autodromo Enzo e Dino Ferrari
July 7, 2020	Vienna	Austria	Wiener Stadthalle
July 10, 2020	London	England	BST Hyde Park
July 13, 2020	Kraków	Poland	Tauron Arena
July 15, 2020	Budapest	Hungary	Budapest Sports Arena
July 17, 2020	Zürich	Switzerland	Hallenstadion
July 19, 2020	Paris	France	Lollapalooza
July 22, 2020	Amsterdam	Netherlands	Ziggo Dome
July 23, 2020	Amsterdam	Netherlands	Ziggo Dome

== Band members ==
Pearl Jam

- Jeff Ament – bass guitar
- Stone Gossard – rhythm guitar
- Mike McCready – lead guitar
- Eddie Vedder – lead vocals, guitar
- Matt Cameron – drums

Additional musicians

- Boom Gaspar – Hammond B3 and keyboards
- Josh Klinghoffer – drums, guitar, keyboards, percussion, backing vocals
- Richard Stuverud – drums
- Dave Krusen – drums (Fresno concert)
