= Pearl Jam 2018 Tour =

Concert tour by Pearl Jam

- World tour by Pearl Jam
- Promotional poster for the tour
- Location: Europe; North America; South America
- Start date: March 13, 2018
- End date: September 4, 2018
- Legs: 3
- No. of shows: 27

Pearl Jam concert chronology
- Pearl Jam 2016 North America Tour (2016); Pearl Jam 2018 Tour (2018); Gigaton Tour (2022–2023)

The Pearl Jam 2018 Tour was a concert tour by the American rock band Pearl Jam. The tour consisted of twenty-seven shows, with five in South America, fifteen in Europe and seven in North America. It was the band's first tour following their North American tour that finished in August 2016.

The South American shows took place in March 2018 and were part of the Lollapalooza festival. The band also played their own headlining shows at the Movistar Arena, Chile and the Maracanã Stadium, Brazil. The European shows started at the Ziggo Dome in Amsterdam on June 12 and concluded at the NOS Alive Festival in Lisbon on July 14, 2018. On March 30, 2018, a second show at the Ziggo Dome was announced.

In January 2018, the band announced two shows at Safeco Field in Seattle, billed as the "Home Shows", with proceeds to benefit regional homelessness programs. It was the first time in five years since the band last played in their hometown. Later the same month, five more dates were announced in North America, under the name of the "Away Shows". The band used the show at Washington–Grizzly Stadium in Missoula, Montana to promote their Rock2Vote campaign to encourage young people to vote. Pearl Jam's shows at Wrigley Field and Fenway Park ended up earning $8.1 million and $7.7 million respectively, topping the Billboard Boxscore chart that was dated November 3, 2018.

== Tour ==
=== South America ===
Prior to the first shows in South America, Pearl Jam released a new song, "Can't Deny Me", which was at the time supposed to be on their forthcoming album, Gigaton, but didn’t end up making the final cut. The tour started on March 13, 2018, with a show at the Movistar Arena in Santiago, Chile. At the opening show of the tour, the band played their new song for the first time, dedicating it to the victims of the Stoneman Douglas High School shooting. They also played the song "Come Back" in memory of Chris Cornell who died the previous year. Pearl Jam's show on March 18, 2018, at the Lollapalooza festival in Argentina, was cancelled due to severe weather. At the final show in South America, in Brazil, Pearl Jam were joined onstage with Perry Farrell, frontman of Jane's Addiction and co-founder of Lollapalooza, to play the Jane's Addiction track "Mountain Song".

=== Europe ===
The European tour started with two shows at the Ziggo Dome in Amsterdam, with the band paying tribute to Anthony Bourdain and Chris Cornell. The tour continued with an appearance at the Pinkpop Festival, also in the Netherlands. The next scheduled dates were two sold out nights at the O2 Arena in London, England. However, after playing the first show, Eddie Vedder lost his voice, and the second night was postponed until July 17. It was the first time that the band had postponed a show for this reason. The tour continued, with Pearl Jam playing at the i-Days Festival in Milan, Italy on June 22. They played two further shows in Italy, in Padua and Rome. The show in Rome saw the band cover several songs, including "Comfortably Numb" by Pink Floyd, "Eruption" by Van Halen and "Black Diamond" by Kiss, with drummer Matt Cameron on vocals for the latter.

The European tour continued with several more arena shows, with Pearl Jam covering "Help!" by the Beatles at the gig in Prague, and they were joined onstage with J Mascis of Dinosaur Jr. to cover Neil Young's "Rockin' in the Free World" in Berlin. Following the arena shows, the band played three festival dates: the Werchter Festival in Belgium, the Mad Cool Festival in Spain, and the NOS Alive Festival in Portugal. The European leg concluded on July 17, 2018, with the rescheduled date at London's O2 Arena. The Donald Trump baby balloon was on display outside the venue prior to and during the gig.

=== North America ===
The American leg started on August 8, 2018, with a concert at Safeco Field in the band's hometown of Seattle, as part of project across the city to tackle homelessness. At the first show in Seattle, the band covered "We're Going to Be Friends" by the White Stripes. At the second Seattle show, Pearl Jam covered the Chris Cornell song "Missing", which was written for the Singles Soundtrack. The band were also joined onstage with Kim Thayil of Soundgarden, along with Mark Arm and Steve Turner from Mudhoney. The two shows raised more than $11 million to help with homelessness in the city. The next show was at the Washington–Grizzly Stadium in Missoula on August 13, where Pearl Jam promoted the Rock2Vote campaign, to get young people voting. The poster for the gig featured an image of Donald Trump's corpse being pecked at by a bald eagle outside the White House. It drew some controversy, with the Republican candidate for the Senate election in Montana, Matt Rosendale, calling it "disgusting and reprehensible".

The next two dates of the tour were at Wrigley Field, Chicago. At the first night, the band covered "Rebel Rebel" by David Bowie, and were later joined onstage with Dennis Rodman. Writing for the Chicago Sun-Times, Selena Fragassi said that "Pearl Jam shows remain some of the most unpredictable and eclectic live performances". As per the show at Wrigley Field on the 2013 tour, the second night in Chicago suffered a rain delay during Pearl Jam's set. The band were able to return to the stage to complete the show, which included the first ever live performance of the song "Evil Little Goat", an outtake from their debut album Ten.

The tour concluded with two sold-out shows at Fenway Park in Boston. At the first show, the song "Out of My Mind", an outtake from Vitalogy, was played for the first time in nine years. The Boston Herald's Jed Gottlieb said that the band "seemed to pluck sublime rock, unafraid of real emotion from nowhere, and thrill the stadium".

== Tour dates ==
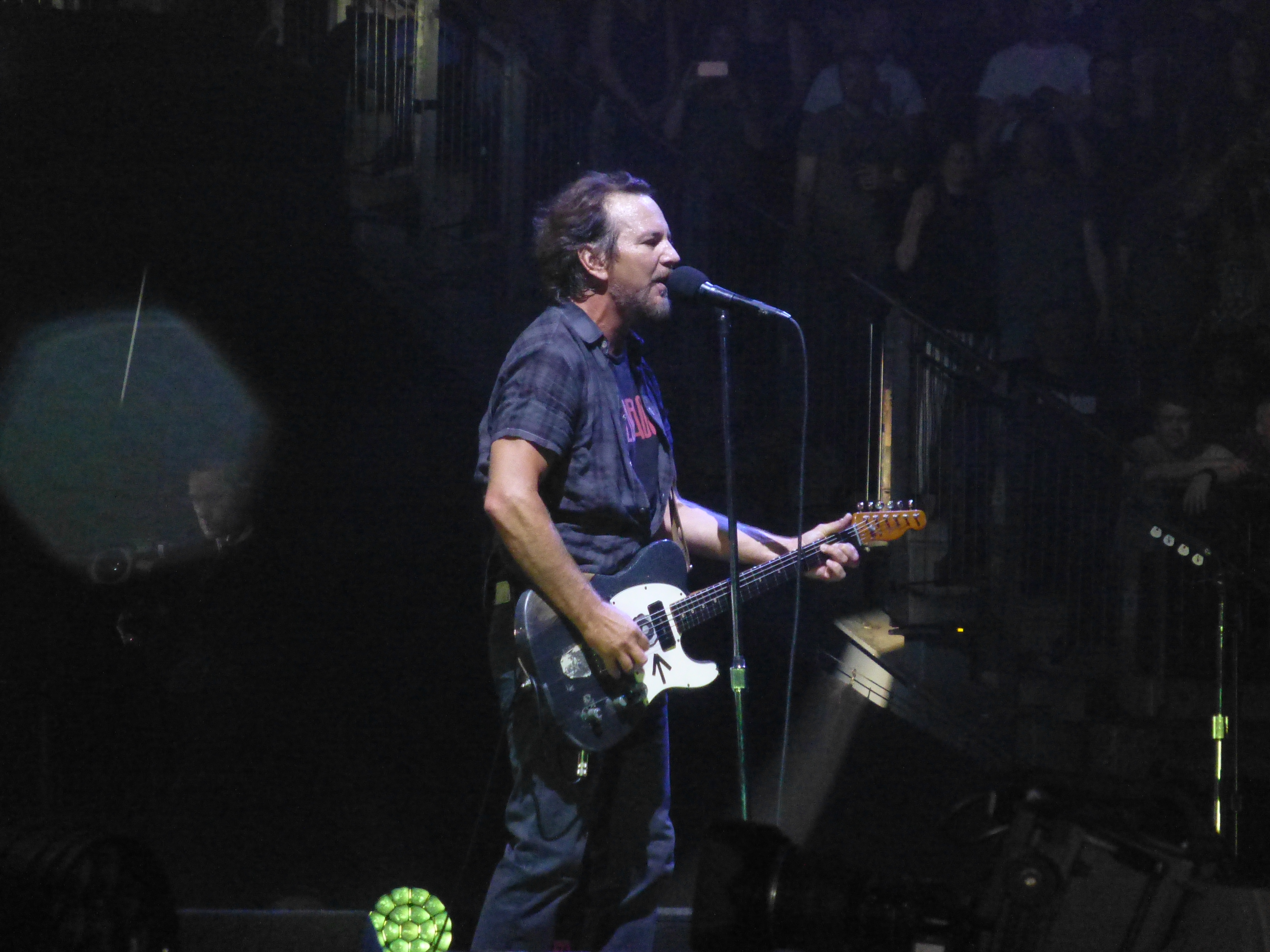
Frontman Eddie Vedder at the O2 Arena, London on June 18, 2018

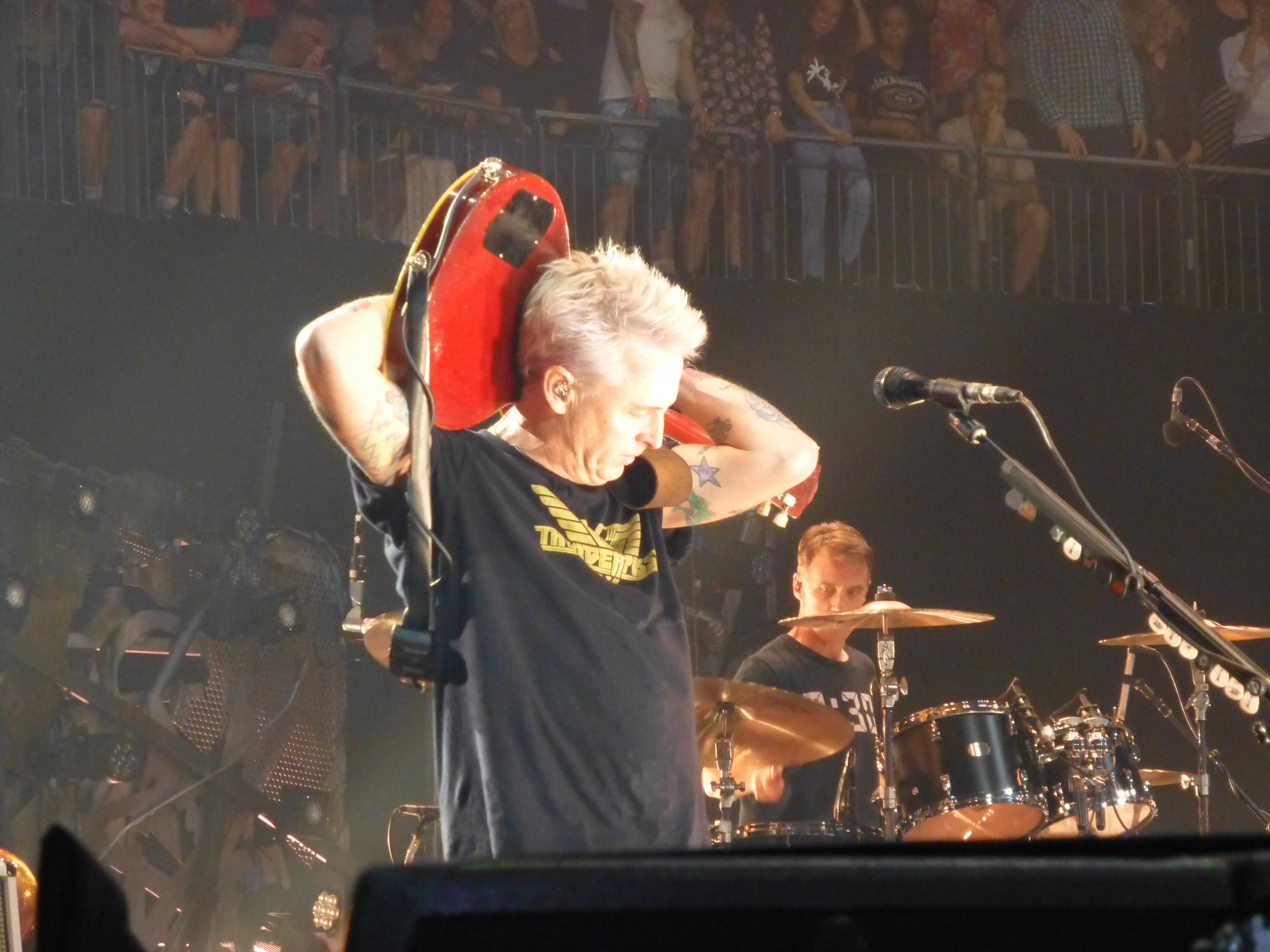
Guitarist Mike McCready at the O2 Arena, London on June 18, 2018

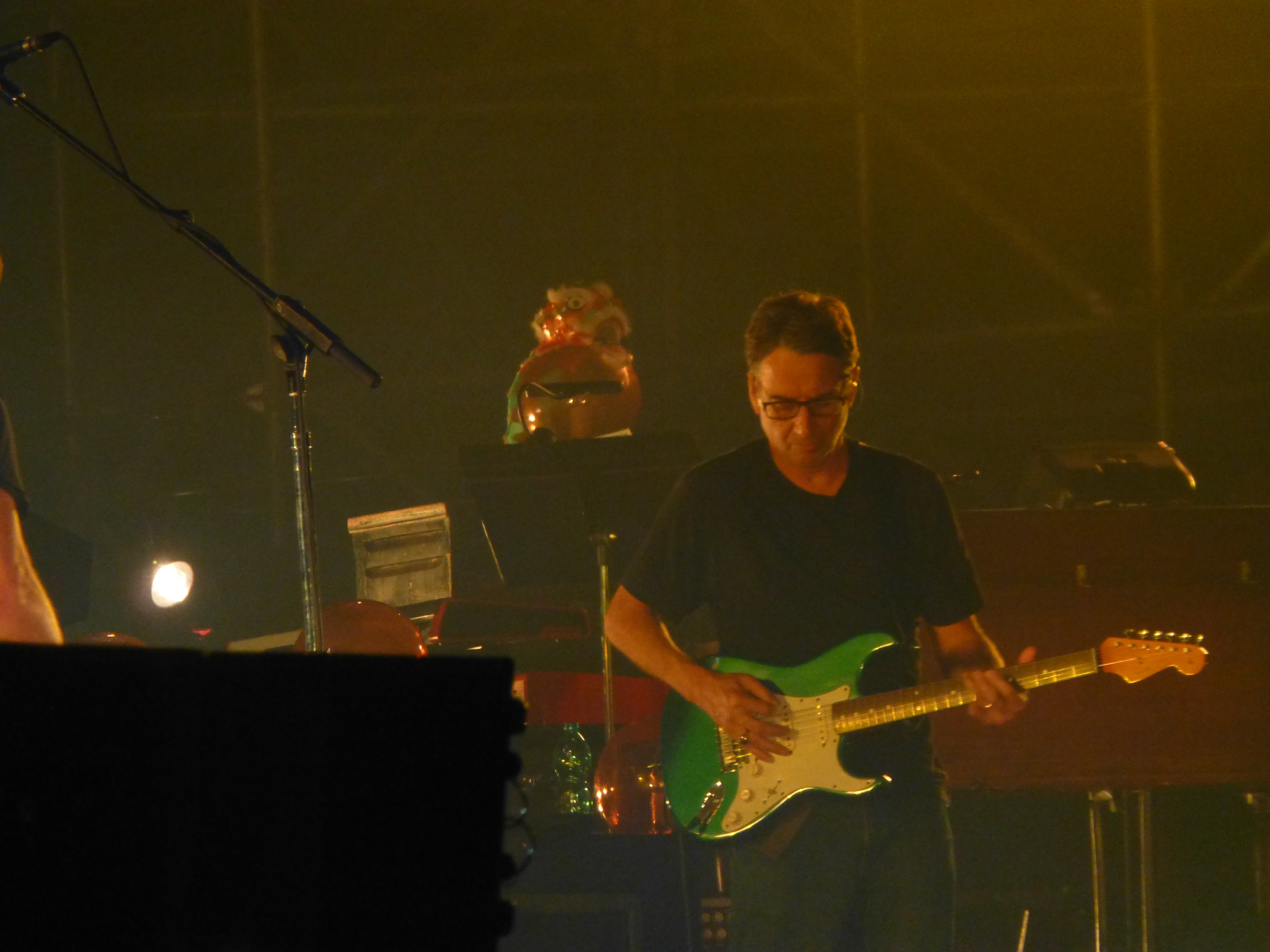
Guitarist Stone Gossard at the Stadio Euganeo, Padua on June 24, 2018

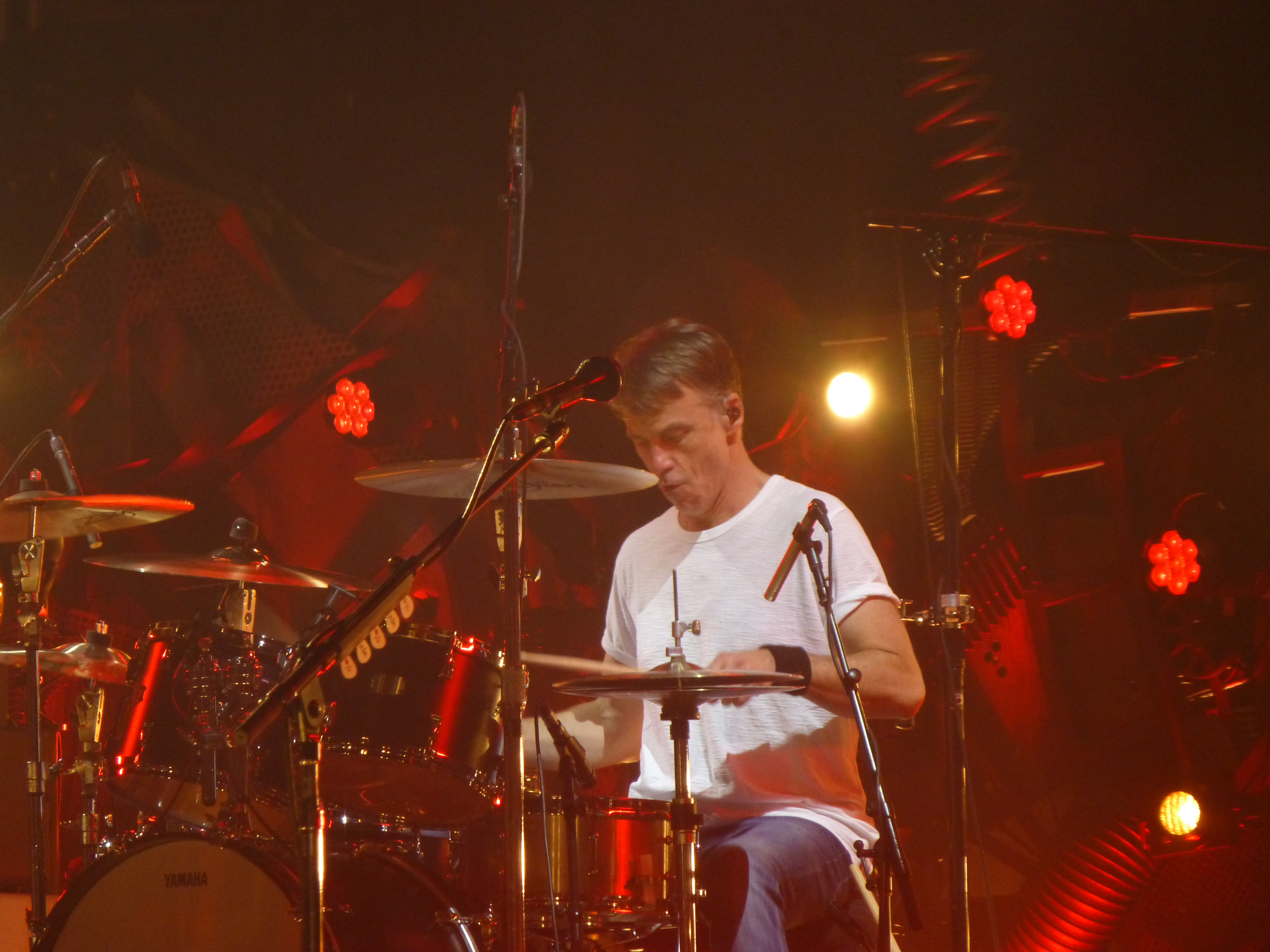
Drummer Matt Cameron at the O2 Arena, Prague on July 1, 2018

List of 2018 concerts
Date	City	Country	Venue	Attendance	Revenue
March 13, 2018	Santiago	Chile	Movistar Arena	—	—
March 16, 2018^{[A]}	Santiago	Chile	O'Higgins Park	—N/a	—N/a
~~March 18, 2018^{[A]}~~	~~Buenos Aires~~	~~Argentina~~	~~Hipódromo de San Isidro~~ (Cancelled due to severe weather)	—N/a	—N/a
March 21, 2018	Rio de Janeiro	Brazil	Maracanã Stadium	43,000 / 43,000	$4,324,380
March 24, 2018^{[A]}	São Paulo	Brazil	Autódromo José Carlos Pace	—N/a	—N/a
June 12, 2018	Amsterdam	Netherlands	Ziggo Dome	—	—
June 13, 2018	Amsterdam	Netherlands	Ziggo Dome	—	—
June 15, 2018^{[B]}	Landgraaf	Netherlands	Megaland	—N/a	—N/a
June 18, 2018	London	England	The O2 Arena	19,221 / 19,221	$2,669,400
~~June 19, 2018~~	London	England	The O2 Arena	19,221 / 19,221	$2,669,400
June 22, 2018^{[C]}	Milan	Italy	Arena Expo	—N/a	—N/a
June 24, 2018	Padua	Italy	Stadio Euganeo	—	—
June 26, 2018	Rome	Italy	Stadio Olimpico	—	—
July 1, 2018	Prague	Czech Republic	O2 Arena	—	—
July 3, 2018	Kraków	Poland	Tauron Arena	—	—
July 5, 2018	Berlin	Germany	Waldbühne	—	—
July 7, 2018^{[D]}	Werchter	Belgium	Werchter Festivalpark	—N/a	—N/a
July 10, 2018	Barcelona	Spain	Palau Sant Jordi	—	—
July 12, 2018^{[E]}	Madrid	Spain	Espacio Mad Cool	—N/a	—N/a
July 14, 2018^{[F]}	Lisbon	Portugal	Passeio Marítimo de Algés	—N/a	—N/a
July 17, 2018^{[G]}	London	England	The O2 Arena	19,572 / 19,572	$2,632,820
August 8, 2018	Seattle	United States	Safeco Field	91,918 / 91,918	$11,829,518
August 10, 2018	Seattle	United States	Safeco Field	91,918 / 91,918	$11,829,518
August 13, 2018	Missoula	United States	Washington–Grizzly Stadium	23,690 / 23,690	$2,114,194
August 18, 2018	Chicago	United States	Wrigley Field	83,348 / 83,348	$8,106,534
August 20, 2018	Chicago	United States	Wrigley Field	83,348 / 83,348	$8,106,534
September 2, 2018	Boston	United States	Fenway Park	72,092 / 72,092	$7,735,558
September 4, 2018	Boston	United States	Fenway Park	72,092 / 72,092	$7,735,558
Total				352,841 / 352,841	$38,412,404

Notes

^{A} These concerts are part of the Lollapalooza festival.
^{B} This concert is part of the Pinkpop Festival.
^{C} This concert is part of the i-Days Festival.
^{D} This concert is part of the Werchter Festival.
^{E} This concert is part of the Mad Cool Festival.
^{F} This concert is part of the NOS Alive Festival.
^{G} This concert was originally scheduled to take place on June 19.

== Band members ==
Pearl Jam

- Jeff Ament – bass guitar
- Stone Gossard – rhythm guitar
- Mike McCready – lead guitar
- Eddie Vedder – lead vocals, guitar
- Matt Cameron – drums

Additional musicians

- Boom Gaspar – Hammond B3 and keyboards
