= Arena Kraków =

Indoor arena in Kraków, Poland

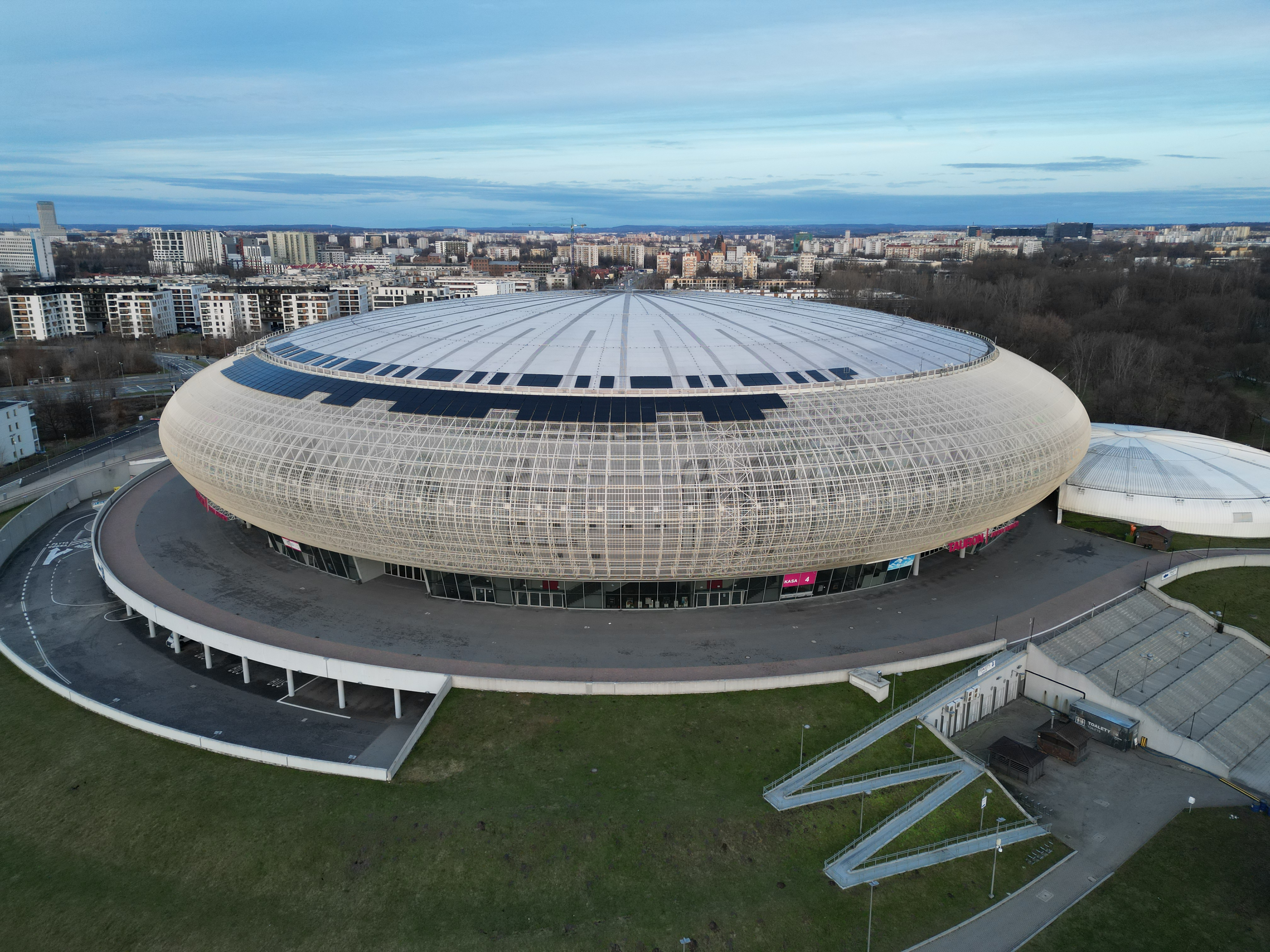
- Arena Kraków in 2023
- Interactive map of Arena Kraków
- Location: Stanisława Lema 7, 31-571, Kraków, Poland
- Coordinates: 50°04′02.9″N 19°59′30.1″E
- Capacity: 15,030 (seated); 22,000 (maximum)

Construction
- Groundbreaking: May 2010
- Opened: 12 May 2014
- Cost: PLN zł 445 million EUR € 106 million

Website
- http://www.tauronarenakrakow.pl/en

Arena Kraków, known as Tauron Arena Kraków for sponsorship reasons, is a multi-purpose indoor arena located in Kraków, Poland. It is the largest indoor arena in Poland, with a seating capacity of 15,030 for sporting events, an average capacity of 18,000 for concerts and maximum capacity of 22,000. It hosted the 2014 FIVB Volleyball Men's World Championship tournament, 2016 European League of Legends Championship Finals and 2015 IIHF Ice Hockey World Championship Division I.

== Overview ==
Arena Kraków is the largest and one of the most modern entertainment and sports venues in Poland. It has the facilities to host a variety of sports events, including badminton, boxing, curling, acrobatic and artistic gymnastics, indoor football, hockey, basketball, track and field, figure skating, volleyball, handball, martial arts, extreme sports, tennis, table tennis, equestrian competitions, and sports dancing competitions. The arena meets the requirements for the organization of world championship events

The facility is also adapted to the organization of trade fairs, concerts, performances, congresses, conferences and business events. Events also take place in the area around the venue and in the smaller adjoined arena, which serves both as a training hall and a place for organizing smaller events

The facility area has 61,434 m^{2}, with maximum area of the arena court of 4 546 m^{2}. The average capacity is 18,000 for concerts, and 15,000 for sport events, with maximum number of spectators being 22,000. The Arena boasts Poland's largest LED media façade, with a total surface of 5,200 m^{2} of LED strip lighting, wrapping around the stadium, and one of Europe's largest LED screens, measuring over 540 m^{2}.

== Events ==
=== Sports events ===
- 2014 FIVB Volleyball Men's World Championship
- UFC Fight Night: Gonzaga vs. Cro Cop 2
- 2015 IIHF Ice Hockey World Championship Division I
- 2016 European Men's Handball Championship
- 2016 Summer European League of Legends Championship Series finals
- 2017 Men's European Volleyball Championship
- 2017 PGL CS:GO Major Championship
- Intel Extreme Masters Kraków 2026 CS2 Tournament

=== Concerts ===
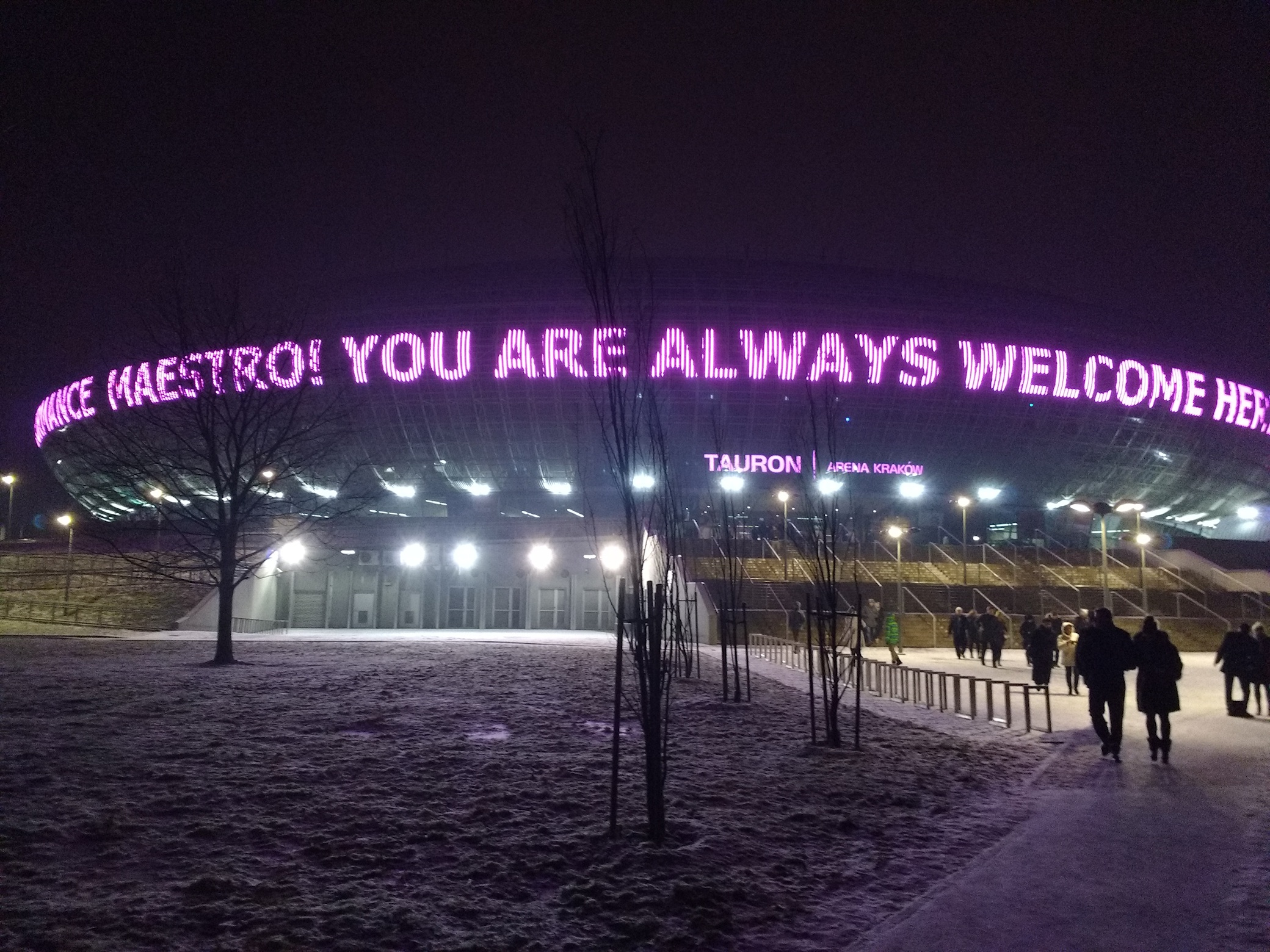
Thank you message after Ennio Morricone concert

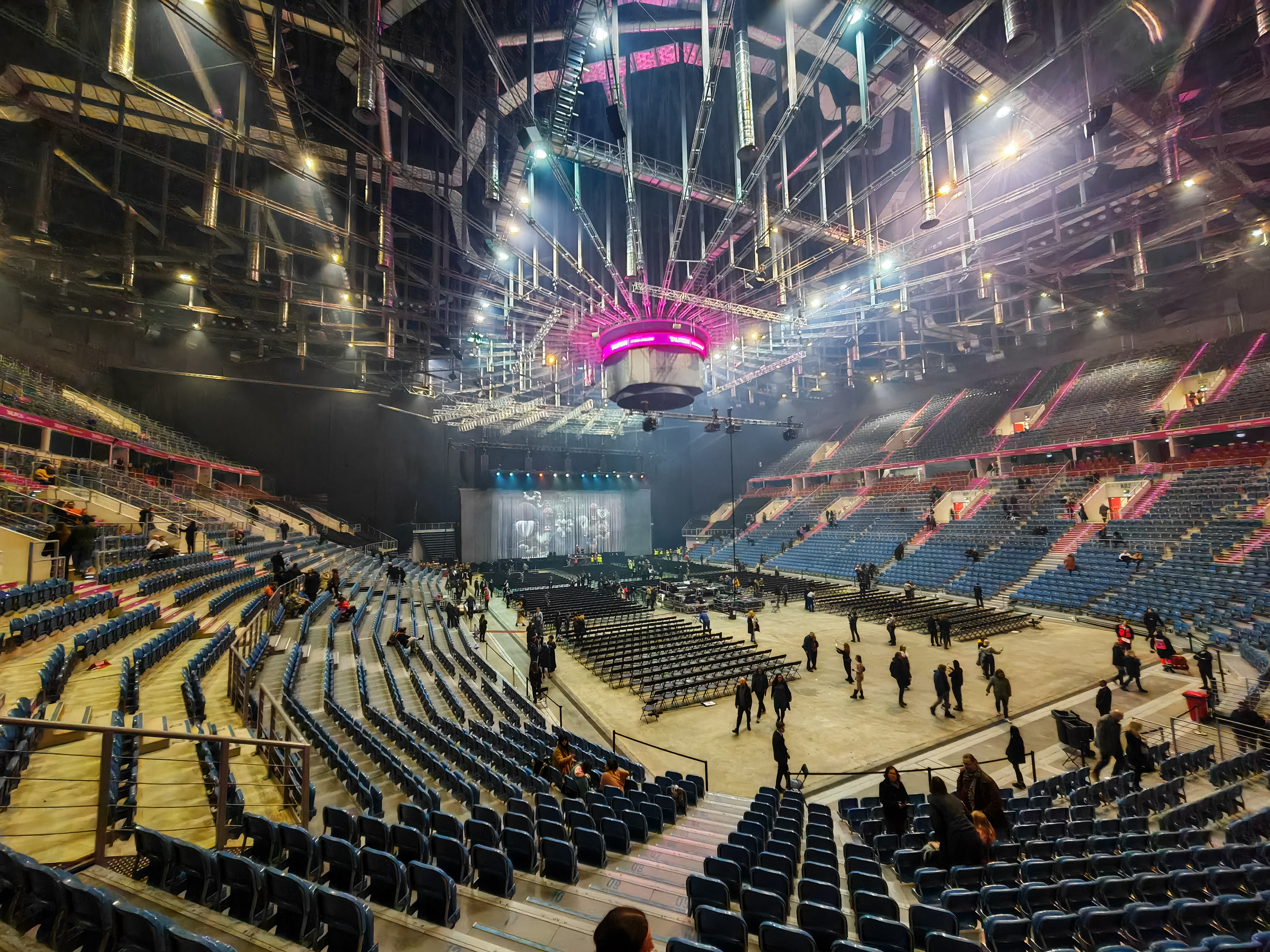
The arena, in concert mode, during Björk's Cornucopia in 2023

Concerts at Tauron Arena
Date	Artist	Tour	Attendance
4 November 2014	Michael Bublé	To Be Loved Tour	—N/a
5 November 2014	Elton John	Follow the Yellow Brick Road Tour	—N/a
20 November 2014	Slash	World on Fire World Tour	—N/a
16 December 2014	Bryan Adams	Reckless 30th Anniversary Tour	—N/a
14 February 2015	Ennio Morricone		—N/a
21 February 2015	Queen + Adam Lambert	Queen + Adam Lambert Tour 2014–2015	—N/a
24 February 2015	Katy Perry	The Prismatic World Tour	12 500
17 April 2015	Robbie Williams	Let Me Entertain You Tour	—N/a
28 May 2015	André Rieu		—N/a
8 June 2015	Faith No More		—N/a
13 July 2015	Mark Knopfler	Tracker Tour	—N/a
25/26 August 2015	Violetta	Violetta Live	—N/a
29 September 2015	Eros Ramazzotti	Eros World Tour 2015	—N/a
9 November 2015	Foo Fighters	Sonic Highways World Tour	—N/a
20 December 2015	José Carreras	A Life in Music	—N/a
6 February 2016	Thomas Anders + Modern Talking		—N/a
4 March 2016	Scorpions	Get Your Sting and Blackout World Tour	—N/a
11 April 2016	Mariah Carey	Sweet Sweet Fantasy Tour	—N/a
3 May 2016	Hans Zimmer		—N/a
15 May 2016	Al Bano and Romina Power		—N/a
31 May 2016	Il Divo	Amor & Pasión Tour 2016	—N/a
1 June 2016	Maroon 5	Maroon V Tour	16,700
4 June 2016	André Rieu		—N/a
15 June 2016	Zaz		—N/a
2 July 2016	Black Sabbath	The End Tour	—N/a
8 September 2016	Kings of Leon		—N/a
11 November 2016	Justin Bieber	Purpose World Tour	16,010
27 November 2016	Martin Garrix		—N/a
16 December 2016	Enrique Iglesias	Sex and Love Tour	—N/a
21 January 2017	Green Day	Revolution Radio Tour	—N/a
6 February 2017	Ennio Morricone	60 Years of Music World Tour	—N/a
8 February 2017	Lara Fabian		—N/a
19 February 2017	Rod Stewart	Hits	—N/a
24 February 2017	Lindsey Stirling	Brave Enough Tour	—N/a
3 March 2017	Sabaton	The Last Tour	—N/a
6 May 2017	Hardwell	Go Hardwell or go home Tour	—N/a
27 May 2017	Bruno Mars	24K Magic World Tour	18,528
30 May 2017	Hans Zimmer	Live on Tour	—N/a
2 June 2017	Aerosmith	Aero-Vederci Baby! Tour	—N/a
15 June 2017	Linkin Park	One More Light World Tour	—N/a
17 June 2017	System of a Down	Impact Festival	—N/a
9 July 2017	Jean-Michel Jarre	Electronica World Tour	—N/a
12 October 2017	Sting	57th & 9th Tour	17,166
17 October 2017	Imany		—N/a
25 October 2017	David Garrett	Explosive – Live	—N/a
11 November 2017	Andrea Bocelli		—N/a
11 November 2017	James Newton Howard		—N/a
27 January 2018	David Guetta		—N/a
7 February 2018	Depeche Mode	Global Spirit Tour	15,390 / 15,390
8 April 2018	The Kelly Family	We Got Love – Live 2018	—N/a
28 April 2018	Metallica	WorldWired Tour	19,751 / 19,751
8 June 2018	Lenny Kravitz	Raise Your Vibration Tour	—N/a
1 July 2018	Deep Purple	The Long Goodbye Tour	—N/a
3 July 2018	Pearl Jam	Pearl Jam 2018 Tour	—N/a
27 July 2018	Iron Maiden	Legacy of the Beast World Tour	30,617
28 July 2018	Iron Maiden	Legacy of the Beast World Tour	30,617
3 August 2018	Roger Waters	Us + Them Tour	16,937 / 17,054
3 December 2018	Paul McCartney	Freshen Up Tour 2018	—N/a
2 April 2019	Shawn Mendes	Shawn Mendes The Tour	TBA
4 May 2019	Elton John	Farewell Yellow Brick Road	13,972
7 May 2019	Enrique Iglesias	All The Hits Live	TBA
18 June 2019	KISS	End of the Road World Tour	TBA
21 June 2019	Rod Stewart	Live in Concert	TBA
22 June 2019	Muse	Simulation Theory Tour	14,222 / 14,222
30 June 2020	System of a Down	—N/a	TBA
10 September 2020	Rage Against the Machine	Public Service Announcement Tour	TBA
28 April 2022	5 Seconds of Summer	Take My Hand World Tour	TBA
14 July 2022	Pearl Jam	Gigaton Tour	TBA
18 July 2022	Harry Styles	Love On Tour	15,158 / 15,158
18 November 2022	Björk	Cornucopia	–
12 March 2023	Robbie Williams	XXV Tour	TBA
13/14 June 2023	Iron Maiden	The Future Past Tour	45,000
4 August 2023	Depeche Mode	Memento Mori World Tour	15,390
10 September 2023	Louis Tomlinson	Faith In The Future World Tour	
10 March 2024	Celine Dion	Courage World Tour	TBA
9 May 2024	Thirty Seconds to Mars	Seasons Tour	
16 October 2024	Jonas Brothers	Five Albums. One Night. The World Tour	
2 July 2024	Travis Scott	Circus Maximus Tour	
26 July 2024	Justin Timberlake	The Forget Tomorrow World Tour	
27 July 2024	Justin Timberlake	The Forget Tomorrow World Tour	
9 September 2025	Robbie Williams	Britpop Tour	
23 September 2024	Aurora	What Happened to the Earth?	
10 May 2025	Tyler, The Creator	Chromakopia: The World Tour	
3/4 June 2025	Billie Eilish	Hit Me Hard and Soft: The Tour	~ 40,000
23/24 June 2025	Pitbull	Party After Dark Tour	
5 August 2025	Shawn Mendes	On The Road Again Tour	
28 October 2025	Katy Perry	The Lifetimes Tour	
20 February 2026	Machine Gun Kelly	Lost Americana Tour	
7 March 2026	Florence and the Machine	Everybody Scream Tour	
2 May 2026	The Neighbourhood	Wourld Tour	
11 May 2026	Madison Beer	The Locket Tour	
29 May 2026	Conan Gray	Wishbone World Tour	
19 June 2026	Doja Cat	Tour Ma Vie World Tour	

Cancelled concerts
Date	Artist	Tour
9 September 2019	Ariana Grande	Sweetener World Tour
21 April 2023	Roger Waters	This Is Not a Drill
22 April 2023	Roger Waters	This Is Not a Drill
19 June 2023	Shawn Mendes	Wonder: The World Tour
20 June 2023	Shawn Mendes	Wonder: The World Tour

== See also ==
- List of indoor arenas in Poland
- List of European ice hockey arenas
- Sport in Poland

Preceded by Jyske Bank Boxen; Herning	European Men's Handball Championship; Final Venue; 2016	Succeeded by Arena Zagreb; Zagreb
Preceded by Maracanãzinho; Rio de Janeiro	FIVB Volleyball World League; Final Venue; 2016	Succeeded by Arena da Baixada; Curitiba
Preceded by Max-Schmeling-Halle (Germany) Berlin	CEV Champions League; Final Venue; 2016	Succeeded by PalaLottomatica (Italy) Rome
