= Mount Currie (British Columbia) =

Mountain in British Columbia

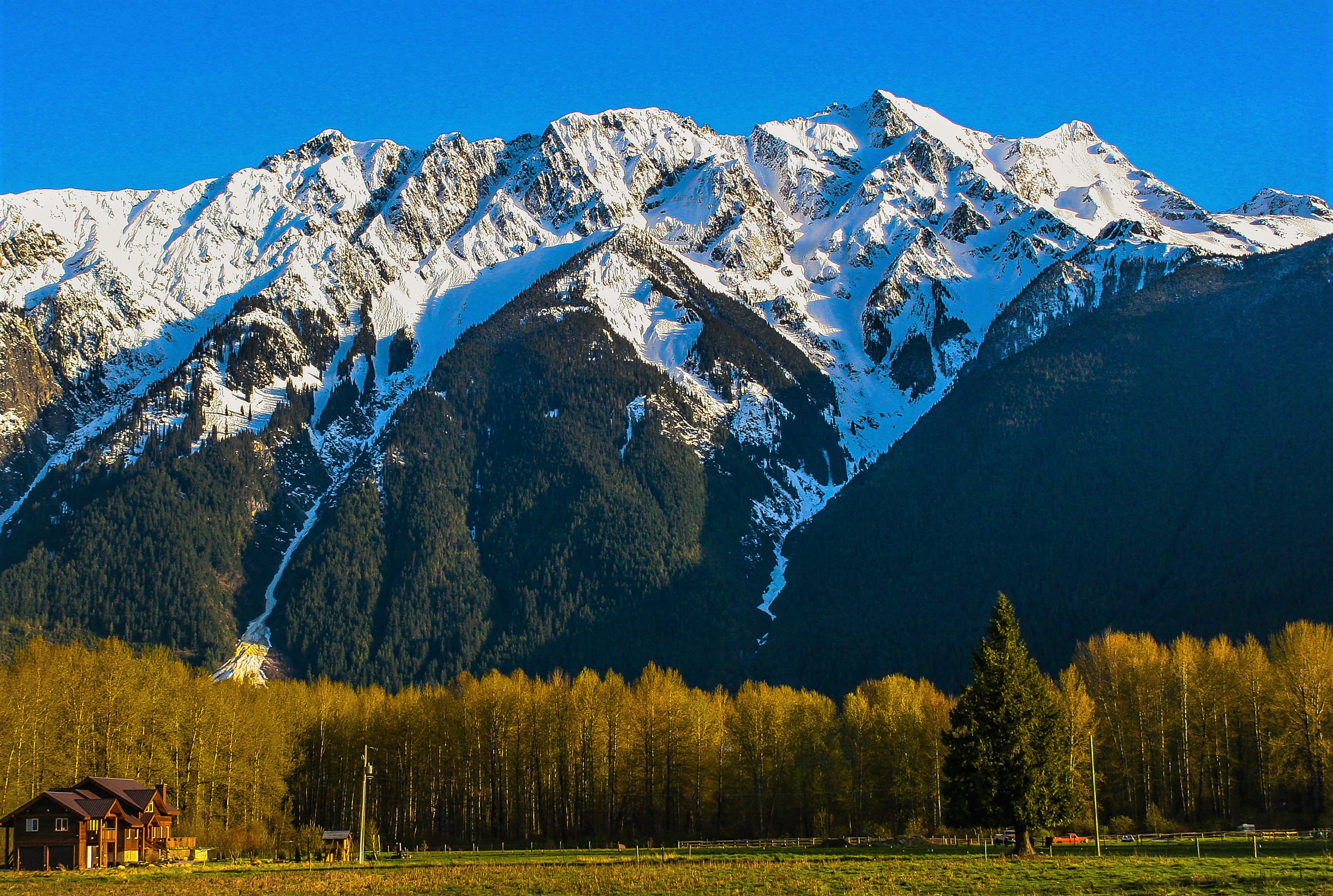
- North aspect

Highest point
- Elevation: 2,591 m (8,501 ft)
- Prominence: 346 m (1,135 ft)
- Coordinates: 50°14′55″N 122°46′55″W

Geography
- Location within British Columbia
- Interactive map of Mount Currie
- Location: British Columbia, Canada
- District: Lillooet Land District
- Parent range: Garibaldi Ranges
- Topo map: NTS 92J2 Whistler

Climbing
- First ascent: 1922

Mount Currie (Lillooet: Ts̓zil [tsʼzel]) is the northernmost summit of the Garibaldi Ranges in southwestern British Columbia, Canada. Its north face dominates the "skyline" of the Pemberton Valley and is one of the peaks visible from the Whistler-Blackcomb Ski Area just southwest. Mount Currie is the namesake of Mount Currie, British Columbia and the adjoining Mount Currie Indian Reserve, home of the Lil'wat First Nation.

The mountain was named for John Currie, the first permanent non-indigenous settler in the Pemberton Valley, who homesteaded the Currie Ranch (a.k.a. "Currie's", later the name of a Pacific Great Eastern Railway stop) in what is now the area of the Mount Currie community/reserve in the 1870s and was the re-builder of the Pemberton Trail.
