= Mudhoney discography =

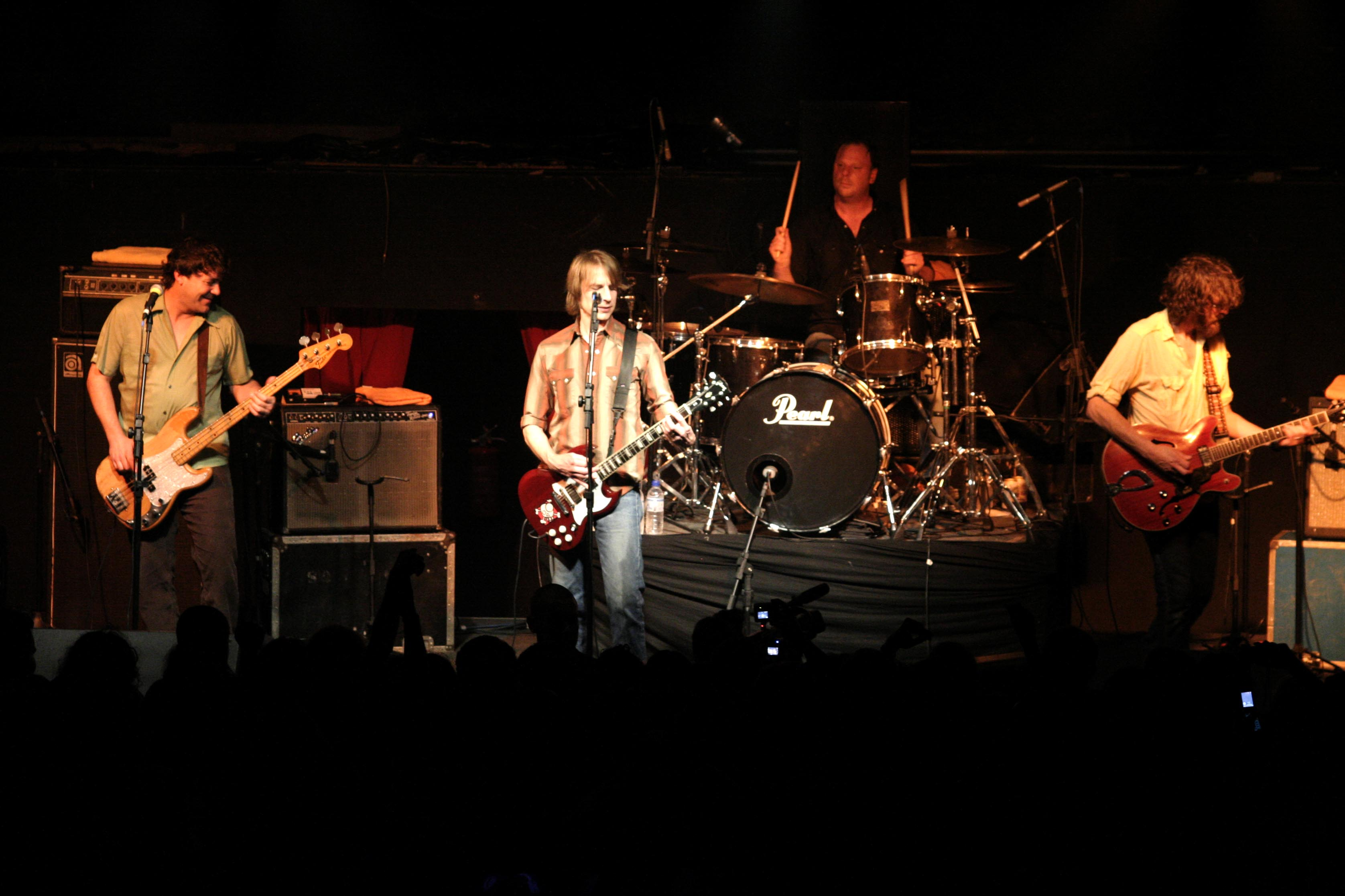
- Studio albums: 11
- Extended plays: 5
- Live albums: 1
- Compilation albums: 4
- Singles: 20
- Video albums: 4
- Music videos: 19

The discography of Mudhoney, a Seattle, Washington-based punk/grunge band, consists of eleven studio albums, four compilation albums, five extended plays (EP), one live album, and twenty singles. This list does not include material recorded by Mudhoney band members with any other project.

Mudhoney was formed in 1988 by vocalist/guitarist Mark Arm and guitarist Steve Turner. The band signed with the independent label Sub Pop and released the Superfuzz Bigmuff EP in 1988 and their debut album Mudhoney in 1989.

After the release of Every Good Boy Deserves Fudge, in 1991, the band signed with Reprise Records and released its third full-length album Piece Of Cake. Before being dropped, Mudhoney released two more albums for the label.

Subsequently, the band signed again with Sub Pop in 2000 issuing Since We've Become Translucent in 2002. Four years later 2006's Under a Billion Suns was released followed in 2008 by The Lucky Ones, which garnered little attention. The Lucky Ones was followed five years later by Vanishing Point.

== Albums ==
=== Studio albums ===
| Year | Title | Peak chart position | | | | |
| Year | Title | US | US Heat. | AUS | SCO | UK |
|---|---|---|---|---|---|---|
| 1988 | Superfuzz Bigmuff: Released: October 20, 1988; Label: Sub Pop; Formats: CD, CS, LP | — | — | — | — | — |
| 1989 | Mudhoney: Released: November 1, 1989; Label: Sub Pop; Formats: CD, CS, LP | — | — | — | — | — |
| 1991 | Every Good Boy Deserves Fudge: Released: July 26, 1991; Label: Sub Pop; Formats: CD, CS, LP | — | — | — | 60 | 34 |
| 1992 | Piece of Cake: Released: October 13, 1992; Label: Reprise; Formats: CD, CS, LP | 189 | 9 | — | — | 39 |
| 1995 | My Brother the Cow: Released: March 28, 1995; Label: Reprise; Formats: CD, CS, LP | — | 19 | 68 | 100 | 70 |
| 1998 | Tomorrow Hit Today: Released: September 22, 1998; Label: Reprise Records; Formats: CD, CS, LP | — | — | — | — | — |
| 2002 | Since We've Become Translucent: Released: August 20, 2002; Label: Sub Pop; Formats: CD, LP | — | — | — | — | — |
| 2006 | Under a Billion Suns: Released: March 7, 2006; Label: Sub Pop; Formats: CD, LP | — | — | — | — | — |
| 2008 | The Lucky Ones: Released: May 20, 2008; Label: Sub Pop; Formats: CD, LP | — | — | — | — | — |
| 2013 | Vanishing Point: Released: April 2, 2013; Label: Sub Pop; Formats: CD, LP | — | 9 | — | | — |
| 2018 | Digital Garbage: Released: September 28, 2018; Label: Sub Pop; Formats: CD, CS, LP | — | 16 | — | 83 | — |
| 2023 | Plastic Eternity: Released: April 7, 2023; Label: Sub Pop; Formats: CD, CS, LP | — | — | — | 42 | — |
"—" denotes albums that were released but did not chart. "×" denotes periods where charts did not exist or were not archived.

=== Compilation albums ===
| Year | Title |
|---|---|
| 1990 | Superfuzz Bigmuff Plus Early Singles: Released: October 25, 1990; Label: Sub Pop; Formats: CD, CS, LP |
| 2000 | March to Fuzz: Released: January 18, 2000; Label: Sub Pop; Formats: CD, CS, LP |
| 2000 | Here Comes Sickness: The Best of the BBC: Released: September 26, 2000; Label: Fuel 2000; Formats: CD, LP |
| 2020 | Real Low Vibe: Reprise Recordings 1992–1998: Released: October 15, 2020; Label: Cherry Red; Formats: CD |

=== Live albums ===
| Year | Title |
|---|---|
| 1993 | Mudhoney Live: Label: Sub Pop; Formats: CD |
| 1993 | On Tour Now: Label: Reprise; Formats: CD (promotional, not for sale) |
| 2007 | Live Mud: Label: Sub Pop; Formats: LP |
| 2009 | Live at El Sol: Label: Munster; Formats: CD, LP |
| 2014 | Live at Third Man Records: Label: Third Man; Formats: LP |
| 2014 | On Top! KEXP Presents Mudhoney Live on Top of the Space Needle: Label: Sub Pop; Formats: LP |
| 2018 | LiE: Label: Sub Pop; Formats: LP |

== Extended plays ==
| Year | Title | Chart position |
| Year | Title | US Heat. |
|---|---|---|
| 1988 | Superfuzz Bigmuff: Released: October, 1988; Label: Sub Pop; Formats: CD, CS, LP | — |
| 1989 | Boiled Beef & Rotting Teeth: Label: Sub Pop; Formats: CD, CS, LP | — |
| 1991 | Let It Slide: Label: Sub Pop; Formats: CD, LP | — |
| 1993 | Five Dollar Bob's Mock Cooter Stew: Released: October 26, 1993; Label: Reprise Records; Formats: CD, CS, LP | 13 |
| 1994 | Buckskin Stallion Blues: Released: March 15, 1994; Label: Sub Pop; Formats: CD, CS, LP | — |
| 2019 | Morning in America: Released: September 20, 2019; Label: Sub Pop; Formats: LP, DL | — |
| 2019 | Pedazo de Pastel: Released: December 2, 2019; Label: Folc Records; Formats: Vinyl, DL | — |
| 2020 | White Lazy Boy (with Melvins): Released: June 8, 2020; Label: Amphetamine Reptile; Formats: CD | — |
"—" denotes albums that were released but did not chart.

== Singles ==
| Year | Title | Chart position | | Album |
| Year | Title | US Mod Rock | UK | Album |
|---|---|---|---|---|
| 1988 | "Touch Me I'm Sick" | — | — | non-album single |
| 1988 | "Halloween" (Sonic Youth cover) | — | 111 | non-album single |
| 1989 | "You Got It (Keep It Outta My Face)" | — | 191 (Note: The "You Got It (Keep It Outta My Face)" single charted at number 3 on the UK Indie Singles chart in 1989, and at number 46 on the UK Indie Singles year-end chart of 1989.) | non-album single |
| 1989 | "This Gift" | — | 182 (Note: "This Gift" also known as "The Gift" charted at number 5 on the UK Indie Singles chart.) | Mudhoney |
| 1990 | "You're Gone" | — | 138 | non-album single |
| 1990 | "Hate the Police" (The Dicks cover) | — | — | Superfuzz Bigmuff Plus Early Singles |
| 1991 | "Let It Slide" | — | 60 | Every Good Boy Deserves Fudge |
| 1991 | "Into the Drink" | — | — | Every Good Boy Deserves Fudge |
| 1991 | "She's Just Fifteen" (Billy Childish cover) | — | — | non-album single |
| 1992 | "You Stupid Asshole" (Angry Samoans cover) | — | 84 | non-album single |
| 1992 | "Suck You Dry" | 23 | 65 | Piece of Cake |
| 1993 | "Blinding Sun" | — | — | Piece of Cake |
| 1994 | "Tonight I Think I'm Gonna Go Downtown" | — | — | Mudhoney / Jimmie Dale Gilmore |
| 1994 | "Pump It Up" (Elvis Costello cover) | — | — | non-album single |
| 1995 | "Goat Cheese" | — | — | non-album single |
| 1995 | "Into Yer Shtik" | — | — | My Brother the Cow |
| 1995 | "Generation Spokesmodel" | — | 100 | My Brother the Cow |
| 1998 | "Night of the Hunted" | — | — | Tomorrow Hit Today |
| 1998 | "Ghost" (Cheater Slicks cover) | — | — | Tomorrow Hit Today |
| 1999 | "Butterfly Stroke" | — | — | March to Fuzz |
| 2002 | "Sonic Infusion" | — | — | Since We've Become Translucent |
| 2006 | "It Is Us" | — | — | Under a Billion Suns |
| 2008 | "Urban Guerilla" (Hawkwind cover) | — | — | non-album single |
| 2013 | "New World Charm" | — | — | non-album single |
| 2013 | "Did He Die" (The Seeds cover) | — | — | non-album single |
| 2018 | "One Bad Actor" | — | — | non-album single |
| 2018 | "Paranoid Core" | — | — | Digital Garbage |
| 2021 | "Warning" (The Aynsley Dunbar Retaliation cover) | — | — | non-album single |
"—" denotes singles that did not chart.

== Long-form videos ==
| Year | Title |
|---|---|
| 1995 | No. 1 Video in America This Week: Released: September 26, 1995; Label: Warner Reprise Video; Formats: VHS |
| 2008 | Live at El Sol: Released: July 22, 2008; Label: Munster; Formats: DVD |
| 2012 | I'm Now: The Story of Mudhoney: Released: June 8, 2012 (theatrical premiere) / October 30, 2012 (online rental) / December 11, 2012 (DVD); Label: King of Hearts Productions; Formats: theatrical / VOD / DVD |
| 2012 | Live: Berlin 1988: Released: November 13, 2012; Label: !K7 Records; Formats: DVD |

== Music videos ==
| Year | Title | Director(s) | Ref. |
|---|---|---|---|
| 1989 | "This Gift" | Steve Brown | |
| 1989 | "Here Comes Sickness" | Steve Brown | |
| 1991 | "Let It Slide" | Duncan Sharp | |
| 1991 | "Good Enough" | Charles Peterson | |
| 1991 | "Into the Drink" | Charles Peterson | |
| 1991 | "Who You Drivin' Now?" | Dave Markey | |
| 1991 | "Fuzz Gun '91" | Dave Markey | |
| 1991 | "Generation Genocide" | Duncan Sharp | |
| 1992 | "Suck You Dry" | Charles Peterson | |
| 1992 | "Blinding Sun" | Michael Lavine | |
| 1993 | "No Song III" | ? | |
| 1994 | "Pump It Up" | ? | |
| 1995 | "Generation Spokesmodel" | Jeff Economy & Tim Rutili | |
| 1995 | "Judgment, Rage, Retribution and Thyme" | Jeff Economy | |
| 2002 | "Sonic Infusion" | Jack Hodge & Carol Hodge | |
| 2002 | "The Straight Life" | Emily Rieman | |
| 2006 | "It Is Us" | Whitey McConnaughy | |
| 2008 | "Touch Me I'm Sick" | Whitey McConnaughy | |
| 2013 | "I Like It Small" | Carlos F. Lopez | |
| 2013 | "The Only Son of the Widow from Nain" | Carlos F. Lopez | |
| 2018 | "Kill Yourself Live" | Carlos F. Lopez | |
| 2021 | "Ounce of Deception" | Duncan Sharp | |
| 2023 | "Almost Everything" | Arturo Baston | |
| 2023 | "Little Dogs" | Eleanor Petry | |

== Other appearances ==
| Year | Track(s) | Title | Label |
|---|---|---|---|
| 1988 | "Twenty Four" | Dope-Guns-'N-Fucking In The Streets Volume One | Amphetamine Reptile Records |
| 1988 | "Hate the Police" | Mondo Stereo | Away From The Pulsebeat |
| 1988 | "The Rose" | Sub Pop 200 | Sub Pop |
| 1989 | "Sweet Young Thing" | This House is not a Motel | Glitterhouse |
| 1991 | "Come to Mind" | The Grunge Years | Sub Pop |
| 1992 | "Overblown" | Singles: Original Motion Picture Soundtrack | Epic Records |
| 1993 | "Freak Momma" (with Sir Mix-a-Lot) | Judgment Night (Music From the Motion Picture) | Epic Records |
| 1994 | "Run Shithead Run" | With Honors (Music from the Motion Picture) | Maverick/Warner Bros. Records |
| 1994 | "Pump It Up" | PCU: Music from the Motion Picture | Fox Records |
| 1996 | "1995 (Live)" | Bite Back: Live at the Crocodile Cafe | PopLlama Records |
| 1996 | "Poisoned Water" | Black Sheep (Original Motion Picture Score) | Not On Label (William Ross) |
| 1996 | "Touch Me I'm Sick (Live)" | Hype! The Motion Picture Soundtrack | Sub Pop |
| 1999 | "War in Peace" | More Oar: A Tribute to the Skip Spence Album | Birdman Records |
| 2001 | "Who'll Be the Next in Line" | Give the People What We Want: Songs of The Kinks | Sub Pop Records |
| 2004 | "Hard-On for War" | Gimme Skelter | Buddyhead Records |
| 2007 | "I Like to Make Noise and Break Things" | Play | DeSoto Records |
