= Morning in America (EP) =

EP by Mudhoney
- Released: September 20, 2019
- Recorded: 2017–2018
- Studios: Studio Litho, Seattle; Crackle & Pop!, Seattle
- Genres: Alternative rock; garage rock
- Length: 22:02
- Label: Sub Pop
- Producer: Johnny Sangster

Mudhoney chronology
Digital Garbage (2018)	Morning in America (2019)	Pedazo de Pastel (2019)

Morning in America is a vinyl and download only EP by American rock band Mudhoney, released on September 20, 2019, by Sub Pop. It contains tracks recorded during the sessions for 2018's Digital Garbage, but not included on that album, plus a couple completed at a later time.

== Background ==
Although guitarist Steve Turner has described Morning in America as an "EP of leftovers" from the Digital Garbage sessions, singer Mark Arm don't feel the tracks are lesser songs necessarily; "they're just songs that for whatever reason didn't make the record," he said in 2023. "There are some that could have been swapped out for songs based on feel."

The album title alludes to a television commercial, known for its opening line, "It's morning again in America." The ad was part of the Ronald Reagan 1984 presidential campaign.

== Content ==
"Vortex of Lies" and "Ensam I Natt" were previously released in 2018 on a limited edition European tour single. "Ensam I Natt", which translates to "Lonely Tonight", is a cover of Swedish rock band the Leather Nun with lyrics translated in English. "One Bad Actor" was previously released as a 2018 limited edition split single with fellow Sub Pop label mates Hot Snakes. "Creeps Are Everywhere", "Morning in America" and "Snake Oil Charmer" are previously unreleased, while "Let's Kill Yourself Live Again" is an alternate version of the Digital Garbage track "Kill Yourself Live," and was previously released as the bonus track for the Japanese CD edition of that album.

== Critical reception ==
Professional ratings
Review scores
Source	Rating
AllMusic	3/5 stars
The Arts Desk	4/5 stars
ClashMusic	8/10

In his updated edition of the book Mudhoney: The Sound and the Fury from Seattle, Keith Cameron writes that together with Digital Garbage, the EP "offered a scathing eco-political health check while retaining all the elements one could want from Mudhoney: rowdy riffs, heroic yowl, frequent outbreaks of bad taste." Brad Cohan, writing for Bandcamp Daily, felt that the vibe on Morning in America, specifically on tracks such as "Vortex of Lies," "Morning in America" and "One Bad Actor," "lurches and grinds with stoner rock mettle, a Stooges-like wah-wah slow burn that's been creeping into the Mudhoney sound since 2002's Since We've Become Translucent."

The Arts Desk's Guy Oddy called the music "magnificent throughout," writing that "the genesis of Morning in America may have emerged from the leftovers of Mudhoney's previous album but it is a record with plenty of the zest and boisterousness, saturated in black humour, that we've come to expect from Mark Arm's crew." Mark Deming of AllMusic wrote, "this music sounds as fierce and committed as anything Mudhoney ever committed to plastic," while ClashMusic's Will Fitzpatrick described it as "wilder, punkier and even funnier" than Digital Garbage.

== Track listing ==
All tracks are written by Mudhoney, except where noted.

No.	Title	Writer(s)	Length
1.	"Vortex of Lies"		3:03
2.	"Creeps Are Everywhere"		2:09
3.	"Ensam I Natt"	Jonas Almqvist	2:11
4.	"Morning in America"		3:42
5.	"Let's Kill Yourself Live Again"		3:09
6.	"Snake Oil Charmer"		4:10
7.	"One Bad Actor"		3:38

== Personnel ==
Adapted from the album liner notes.

Mudhoney

- Mark Arm – vocals, guitar
- Steve Turner – guitar, vocals
- Dan Peters – drums, percussion, vocals
- Guy Maddison – bass, synthesizer, vocals

Additional personnel

- Johnny Sangster – piano, vocals, producer, engineer, mixing
- Jon Roberts – engineer
- Bob Weston – mastering
- Dusty Summers – art direction, design

== Charts ==
Chart (2019)	Position
UK Official Record Store Chart (OCC)	32
