= Boiled Beef & Rotting Teeth =

EP by Mudhoney
- Released: 1989
- Recorded: 1988
- Genre: Grunge
- Length: 13:42
- Label: Tupelo/Sub Pop
- Producer: Jack Endino

Mudhoney chronology
Superfuzz Bigmuff (1988)	Boiled Beef & Rotting Teeth (1989)	Mudhoney (1989)

Boiled Beef & Rotting Teeth is the second EP by the Seattle grunge band Mudhoney. It was released in England in 1989, and contains the band's first two singles, "Touch Me I'm Sick", and "You Got It", along with the b-sides of each. The song "Hate the Police" would also be released as a single. The songs on this EP were later included on the compilation album Superfuzz Bigmuff Plus Early Singles (1990).

== Track listing ==
1. "Hate the Police" (The Dicks) – 2:08
2. "Touch Me I'm Sick" – 2:35
3. "Sweet Young Thing Ain't Sweet No More" – 3:46
4. "You Got It (Keep It Outta My Face)" – 2:53
5. "Burn It Clean" – 3:00

== Personnel ==
- Mark Arm - electric guitar, vocals
- Steve Turner - guitar, backing vocals
- Matt Lukin - bass guitar
- Dan Peters - drums
- Jack Endino - production/engineering
