= My Brother the Cow =

Studio album by Mudhoney
- Released: March 28, 1995
- Recorded: October 1994
- Studios: The Ranch, Seattle
- Genres: Grunge; garage punk
- Length: 40:16 (73:58 including hidden track)
- Label: Reprise
- Producers: Jack Endino; Mudhoney

Mudhoney chronology
Piece of Cake (1992)	My Brother the Cow (1995)	Tomorrow Hit Today (1998)

Singles from My Brother the Cow
- 1. "Generation Spokesmodel" Released: May 22, 1995; 2. "Judgement, Rage, Retribution and Thyme" Released: June 26, 1995; 3. "Into Yer Shtik" Released: 1995

Professional ratings
Review scores
Source	Rating
AllMusic	4.5/5 stars
Rolling Stone	4/5 stars

My Brother the Cow is the fourth studio album by American rock band Mudhoney. It was released on March 28, 1995, through Reprise Records.

Nearly all of the album's songs (excluding the songs from the bonus 7") have been performed in concert. Judgement, Rage, Retribution and Thyme, as well as F.D.K. display constants in Mudhoney's live setlist. The only song that has yet to be performed live is Crankcase Blues.

In 2020, My Brother the Cow was included in the 4CD box set Real Low Vibe: Reprise Recordings 1992-1998.

== Background ==
According to drummer Dan Peters, the album's title derived from Renestair E.J., saxophonist of the band Bloodloss, who was "anesthetizing himself with heavy amounts of bourbon" due to girlfriend troubles. "So we stop at a drive-through," Peters said, "and he's in the back of the car, passed out. We asked him if he wanted anything, and he kinda came to enough to say, "I will not eat anything of my brother the cow." And he passed out again."

== Release history ==
The original CD release includes a 34-minute hidden track named "woC eht rehtorB yM", which consists of most of the album's preceding songs played backwards. Reprise re-issued the album in 2003 with bonus tracks. Tracks 13–18 of this edition were originally on a 7-inch single included with the vinyl LP of the album.

In the United Kingdom, "Generation Spokesmodel" was released as a single on May 22, 1995. The song was released in Australia as a CD single on June 12, 1995. "Not Goin' Down That Road Again" was used as a B-side to the "Generation Spokesmodel" single, and is also included on March to Fuzz. On June 26, 1995, "Judgement, Rage, Retribution and Thyme" was released to US alternative radio.

The song "Into Yer Shtik" received some backlash for the band as Courtney Love thought it was about her in the wake of Kurt Cobain's death. About a month before the release of the album and on frontman Mark Arm's 33rd birthday, head of Reprise called the band's A&R rep Dave Katznelson saying he never wanted to see or speak to the band ever again. Due to the decrease in popularity of grunge at this point, the record only sold around 40,000 copies on its initial release.

== Music ==
My Brother the Cow includes numerous direct references to bands that influenced Mudhoney's sound. The song "F.D.K. (Fearless Doctor Killers)", for example, is a reference to the Bad Brains song "F.V.K. (Fearless Vampire Killers)". "Orange Ball-Peen Hammer" alludes to the song "Orange Claw Hammer" by Captain Beefheart, as well as containing lyrics borrowed from Led Zeppelin. "1995" is homage to the song "1969" by the Stooges, and also includes musical references to "L.A. Blues", another Stooges song.

== Track listing ==
All tracks are written by Mudhoney.

1. "Judgement, Rage, Retribution and Thyme" – 2:34
2. "Generation Spokesmodel" – 2:33
3. "What Moves the Heart?" – 3:12
4. "Today, Is a Good Day" – 3:05
5. "Into Yer Shtik" – 3:48
6. "In My Finest Suit" – 4:57
7. "F.D.K. (Fearless Doctor Killers)" – 2:16
8. "Orange Ball-Peen Hammer" – 3:21
9. "Crankcase Blues" – 3:06
10. "Execution Style" – 2:24
11. "Dissolve" – 3:17
12. "1995" – 5:43
13. "woC eht rehtorB yM" (hidden track) – 33:42

== 2003 re-issue track listing ==
All tracks are written by Mudhoney.

1. "Judgement, Rage, Retribution & Thyme" – 2:34
2. "Generation Spokesmodel" – 2:33
3. "What Moves the Heart?" – 3:12
4. "Today, Is a Good Day" – 3:05
5. "Into Yer Shtik" – 3:48
6. "In My Finest Suit" – 4:57
7. "F.D.K. (Fearless Doctor Killers)" – 2:16
8. "Orange Ball-Peen Hammer" – 3:21
9. "Crankcase Blues" – 3:06
10. "Execution Style" – 2:24
11. "Dissolve" – 3:17
12. "1995" – 5:43

Bonus tracks

13. "Mudhoney Funky Butt" – 1:24
14. "West Seattle Hardcore" – 0:50
15. "Sissy Bar" – 1:06
16. "Carjack '94" – 1:16
17. "Sailor" – 0:25
18. "Small Animals" – 1:17
19. "Not Goin' Down That Road Again" – 3:41

== Personnel ==
Adapted from the album liner notes.

Mudhoney

- Mark Arm
- Matt Lukin
- Dan Peters
- Steve Turner

Additional musicians

- Jon Wahl – harmonica (8)
- Renestair E.J. – tenor sax (12)

Technical personnel

- Jack Endino – production, engineering
- Howie Weinberg – mastering
- Ed Fotheringham – artwork
- Charles Peterson – photography

== Charts ==
Chart performance for My Brother the Cow
Chart (1995)	Peak position
Australian Albums (ARIA)	68
UK Albums (Official Charts)	70
US Heatseekers	19
