= Here Comes Sickness: The Best of the BBC =

Here Comes Sickness: The Best of the BBC Recordings

Compilation album by Mudhoney
- Released: 2000
- Recorded: 1988–2000
- Genre: Garage punk
- Label: Sub Pop
- Producer: Various

Mudhoney chronology
March to Fuzz (2000)	Here Comes Sickness: The Best of the BBC Recordings (2000)	Since We've Become Translucent (2002)

Professional ratings
Review scores
Source	Rating
Allmusic	4/5 stars

Here Comes Sickness: The Best of the BBC Recordings is the third compilation album released by Mudhoney.

== Track listings ==
1. "Here Comes Sickness" – 3:31
2. "If I Think" – 3:30
3. "By Her Own Hand" – 3:15
4. "You Make Me Die" – 1:33
5. "Judgement, Rage, Retribution and Thyme" – 2:25
6. "Dissolve" – 3:00
7. "Poisoned Water Poisons the Mind" – 2:11
8. "Editions of You" – 2:38
9. "Suck You Dry" – 2:27
10. "You Got It (Keep It Out of My Face)" – 2:26
11. "What Moves the Heart" – 3:08
12. "In My Finest Suit" – 4:46
13. "Judgement, Rage, Retribution and Thyme" – 2:19
14. "This Gift" – 3:02
15. "Into Your Schtik" – 3:44
16. "Touch Me I'm Sick" – 2:40
17. "Fuzzgun 91" – 1:54
18. "Poisoned Water Poisons the Mind" – 2:06
19. "When Tomorrow Hits" – 3:25
20. "1995" – 4:55
21. "Hate the Police" – 2:10
