= Matt Lukin =

American musician

- Born: Matthew David Lukin; August 16, 1964 (age 61); Aberdeen, Washington, U.S.
- Genres: Grunge; garage punk; hardcore punk; sludge metal
- Occupation: Musician
- Instrument: Bass
- Years active: 1983–2001
- Labels: Sub Pop; Reprise; Ipecac; Alternative Tentacles; the Alchemy; C/Z
- Formerly of: Mudhoney; Melvins

Matthew David Lukin (born August 16, 1964) is an American former musician, best known as a bassist and founding member of the Melvins and Mudhoney.

== Career ==
=== Melvins (1983–1987) ===
Lukin co-founded the Melvins in 1983 with guitarist/vocalist Buzz Osborne and drummer Mike Dillard in Montesano, Washington, where the trio had attended high school together. Beginning as a Jimi Hendrix cover band and then as a hardcore punk band, they changed their sound when Dillard left and a new drummer, Dale Crover joined the band, playing slower and heavier rock music. Soon they were one of the most important bands in the early Seattle-area grunge scene. When Crover joined the band, the Melvins also relocated to Aberdeen, Washington.

While with the Melvins, Lukin recorded Mangled Demos from 1983; Six Songs (later repackaged as 8 Songs, 10 Songs and then 26 Songs); and the band's first full-length album, Gluey Porch Treatments. He also played bass on the band's four contributions to the Deep Six compilation.

In 1987, the band temporarily dissolved. According to Lukin, Osborne had told him that he was going to relocate to San Francisco to live with then girlfriend Lori Black, and that the Melvins would be disbanding as a result. It was then later found out by Lukin that Crover had moved down there as well, and they hired Black to play bass in the revived version of the band.

=== Mudhoney (1988–2001) ===
Remaining in Washington, Lukin formed the grunge band Mudhoney with vocalist Mark Arm and guitarist Steve Turner, both formerly of Green River, and drummer Dan Peters, formerly of Bundle of Hiss.

Lukin played bass on Mudhoney's first five studio albums (Mudhoney, Every Good Boy Deserves Fudge, Piece of Cake, My Brother the Cow, and Tomorrow Hit Today), as well as two EPs and numerous singles.

Lukin left Mudhoney in June 1999, but rejoined the band in December 2000 for a tour that lasted through January 2001. Since then, Guy Maddison has been Mudhoney's bassist.

In 1996, Pearl Jam wrote and recorded a short and fast punk-rock song entitled "Lukin" for its album No Code, naming it after Matt Lukin. Lukin described the song in an interview for the book Everybody Loves Our Town: An Oral History of Grunge: "Vedder had a stalker chick that would come by his house that was freaking him out. He would start to avoid his house after a while, so he would just come by my place. Vedder'd come over and we'd sit 'round the kitchen and drink and stuff. He would talk about his stalker problem a little bit, but I would just blow it off. It was just drunken talk, throwing darts, having fun. There'd be other people there, sometimes four or five of us. Just me and Eddie and our wives and mutual friends like [then Mudhoney manager] Bob Whittaker. The Pearl Jam song 'Lukin' is about how my kitchen's a sanctuary for him. Also, I was giving him shit about all their songs being too long. That inspired him to make 'Lukin' a one-minute song. I've always flipped him shit. Never let him be the rock star that he is."

== Retirement from music ==
Since leaving Mudhoney in 2001, Lukin has essentially retired from music. Currently, he works as a carpenter in the Seattle area.

== Discography ==
=== With the Melvins ===
- Melvins (1986; a.k.a. "Six Songs")
- Gluey Porch Treatments (1987)
- 10 Songs (1991; recorded in 1986, not the same sessions as debut EP)
- 26 Songs (2003; deluxe re-issue of 10 Songs and debut EP)
- Mangled Demos from 1983 (2005)

=== With Mudhoney ===
- Touch Me I'm Sick (1988)
- Superfuzz Bigmuff (1988)
- Boiled Beef & Rotting Teeth (1989)
- Mudhoney (1989)
- Superfuzz Bigmuff Plus Early Singles (1990)
- Every Good Boy Deserves Fudge (1991)
- Piece of Cake (1992)
- Five Dollar Bob's Mock Cooter Stew (1993)
- My Brother the Cow (1995)
- Tomorrow Hit Today (1998)
