= Five Dollar Bob's Mock Cooter Stew =

EP by Mudhoney
- Released: October 26, 1993
- Recorded: August 1, 1993 Hanszek Audio, Ballard, WA, "Deception Pass" and "Underide" recorded at Egg Studios at the Helm, 1992
- Genres: Garage punk, alternative rock
- Length: 23:11
- Label: Reprise
- Producers: Mudhoney, Kurt Bloch

Mudhoney chronology
Piece of Cake (1992)	Five Dollar Bob's Mock Cooter Stew (1993)	Buckskin Stallion Blues (1994)

Professional ratings
Review scores
Source	Rating
AllMusic	3/5 stars
Christgau's Consumer Guide	(neither)
The Encyclopedia of Popular Music	2/5 stars
Entertainment Weekly	B−
Spin Alternative Record Guide	6/10

Five Dollar Bob's Mock Cooter Stew is an EP by the grunge band Mudhoney released on October 26, 1993, by Reprise Records. Mudhoney vocalist Mark Arm described this EP as a chance for the band to "get new songs out for fans in between albums."

== Song information ==
This EP is a compilation of seven tracks, four of which were new songs at the time of release. Out of the remaining three, two are rare and the last is a re-recording of a previously released song. The song "Make It Now" from Mudhoney's previous album Piece of Cake was re-recorded and re-titled "Make It Now Again" for this EP. "Deception Pass" and "Underide" both appear on previously released singles. The remaining four tracks are all brand new and unique to the EP.

The four new songs feature a very diverse selection of music from "In the Blood" with its 'mid-range pace' to "Six To One" which demonstrates the band's grunge origins. "No Song III" manages to illustrate Dan Peters' "sharp drumming flair", while "Between Me & You Kid"'s slight country sound foreshadows Mudhoney's future, where a year later, they collaborated with Jimmie Dale Gilmore.

All of the tracks, except "Deception Pass" and "Underide" were recorded on August 1, 1993, between 9:30 and 10:15 P.M. at Hanszek Audio. "Deception Pass" and "Underide" were recorded in 1992 at Egg Studios with Conrad Uno at the Helm.

All tracks from this EP are featured on the remastered 2003 re-issue of Piece of Cake by Reprise.

== Criticism ==
Trouser Press speculates that recording Piece of Cake took a lot out of the band, and that as a result, Five Dollar Bob's Mock Cooter Stew became "a dull, dopey mishmash of suburban-boy backwoodsiness" and an overall lackluster effort.

== Album inlay information ==
In the liner notes, producer Kurt Bloch is listed as 'Curt' and 'Kurdt' Bloch on two separate occasions. This mistake is actually a joke, referring to frontman of the band Nirvana, Kurt Cobain, who often intentionally misspelled his name as Kurdt Kobain.

The cover art consists of a photograph which is from the Southern Historical Collection of the Manuscripts Department at the University of North Carolina.

== Track listing ==
All songs are written by Mudhoney.

1. "In the Blood" – 3:08
2. "No Song III" – 4:11
3. "Between Me & You Kid" – 3:38
4. "Six Two One" – 2:35
5. "Make It Now Again" – 4:35
6. "Deception Pass" – 2:52
7. "Underide" – 2:08

== Credits ==
- Mark Arm – Vocals/Guitar
- Dan Peters – Drums
- Matt Lukin – Bass Guitar/Backing Vocals on "Deception Pass"
- Steve Turner – Guitar/Backing Vocals on "Deception Pass"
- Scott McCaughey – Backing Vocals on "Deception Pass"
- Tad Hutchinson – Backing Vocals on "Deception Pass"
- Bob Whittaker – Backing Vocals on "Deception Pass"
- Kurt Bloch – Engineer/Producer
- Conrad Uno – Engineer

== Charts ==
Chart (1993)	Peak position
US Heatseekers	13
