= Plastic Eternity =

Studio album by Mudhoney
- Released: April 7, 2023
- Recorded: November 2021
- Studios: Crackle & Pop, Seattle, Washington, United States
- Genres: Grunge; psychedelic rock
- Length: 42:06
- Label: Sub Pop
- Producer: Johnny Sangster

Mudhoney chronology
Real Low Vibe: Reprise Recordings 1992–1998 (2020)	Plastic Eternity (2023)

Plastic Eternity is the eleventh studio album by American grunge band Mudhoney, released on April 7, 2023, and their eighth released on Sub Pop. It has received positive reviews from critics.

== Recording, release, and promotion ==
Plastic Eternity features the first Mudhoney songs written with someone outside the band, producer Johnny Sangster, who appears on several tracks. Most of the songs on the album were not completely written prior to entering the studio, which is uncharacteristic for the band. When the band felt that certain songs needed another key change or a bridge, Sangster was helpful in coming up with suggestions. According to singer Mark Arm "there was sort of the fog of recording where no one was taking notes of who actually came up with whatever idea. [Sangster] was definitely coming up with ideas. So you know, why not credit him?" It also marks the first Mudhoney album where drummer Dan Peters takes a more active role in the songwriting, contributing riffs and chord progressions to the tracks "Human Stock Capital", "One or Two" and "Little Dogs". The album was written during the COVID-19 pandemic and recorded in nine days at the Seattle studio Crackle & Pop before bassist Guy Maddison moved to Australia. The album was promoted by the single "Almost Everything" and a world tour. Singles "Move Under" and "Little Dogs" followed.

April 7, 2023 was proclaimed Mudhoney Day by King County, Washington to coincide with the album release.

== Reception ==
Professional ratings
Review scores
Source	Rating
AllMusic	3.5/5 stars
The Fire Note	3.5/5 stars
Louder	3.5/5 stars
Louder Than War	5/5 stars
New Noise Magazine	4/5 stars
PopMatters	7/10
Stereoboard.com	4/5 stars
Wall of Sound	9/10

Plastic Eternity received positive reviews from critics noted at review aggregator Metacritic. It has a weighted average score of 78 out of 100, based on six reviews.

Glide Magazine notes unexpected moments in the music, such as the inclusion of love ballad "Little Dogs" and the publication sums up the review that the recording is "a fun alternative album that channels political fury into a fiery collection of aggressive rock". For Louder Sound, Everett True gave this album 3.5 out of five stars, opining that "Mudhoney remain their own, inherent force of nature". Editors of AllMusic Guide scored Plastic Eternity 3.5 out of five stars, with critic Mark Deming commenting that the band continues to be innovative decades into their career and "are capable of surprising us (and themselves) thirty-five years in, and judging from the results, it won't be the last time they'll pull that off".

In The Irish News, David Roy informed readers of Mudhoney Day, encouraging them to listen to the band's music exclusively for 24 hours and noted the diversity of this release, with tracks that "switch[...] off between slow ‘n’ woozy and loud 'n' frustrated to fine effect". BrooklynVegan's Bill Pearis connects this release to the rest of Mudhoney's catalogue and opines that "Plastic Eternity may not be as essential as Superfuzz Bigmuff or Every Good Boy Deserves Fudge, but it's always good to have them back". The Stranger listed nine releases from Pacific Northwest musicians for Bandcamp Friday, a celebration on the streaming music service, and included Plastic Eternity.

Online music venue Bandcamp highlighted this release and reviewed Mudhoney's catalogue, calling this album "a ripper that reaffirms their place in the annals of American hardcore and punk rock". A retrospective from Louder Sound ranked Plastic Eternity fifth out of the band's eleven studio albums.

Christopher J. Lee of PopMatters rated this release a seven out of 10, noting the important legacy of the band for grunge and also how the lyrics are modern and the production is professional, as well as praising the humorous lyrics, but noting that the album "will be a hit-or-miss affair for some listeners, partly due to its length".

== Track listing ==
All songs written by Mark Arm, Guy Maddison, Dan Peters, and Steve Turner, except where noted.

1. "Souvenir of My Trip" – 2:35
2. "Almost Everything" (Arm, Maddison, Peters, Johnny Sangster, Turner) – 4:25
3. "Cascades of Crap" – 3:11
4. "Flush the Fascists" – 2:51
5. "Move Under" – 3:33
6. "Severed Dreams in the Sleeper Cell" – 4:55
7. "Here Comes the Flood" – 3:21
8. "Human Stock Capital" – 2:08
9. "Tom Herman's Hermits" – 2:55
10. "One or Two" (Arm, Maddison, Peters, Sangster, Turner) – 3:53
11. "Cry Me an Atmospheric River" (Arm, Maddison, Peters, Sangster, Turner) – 2:56
12. "Plasticity" – 2:12
13. "Little Dogs" – 3:11

== Personnel ==
Adapted from the album liner notes.

Mudhoney

- Mark Arm – vocals, guitar
- Guy Maddison – bass guitar, synthesizer
- Dan Peters – drums, percussion, guitar, vocals
- Steve Turner – guitar, vocals

Additional personnel

- Jeff Kleinsmith – art direction, design
- Nicholas Law – cover illustration
- Emily Rieman – photography
- Johnny Sangster – backing vocals, organ, guitar, recording, mixing, production
- Bob Weston – mastering

== Charts ==
Chart performance for Plastic Eternity
Chart	Peak	Duration (weeks)
Scottish Albums (Official Charts)	42	1
UK Independent Albums (Official Charts)	17	1
