= Digital Garbage =

Studio album by Mudhoney
- Released: September 28, 2018
- Recorded: September, December 2017
- Studios: Studio Litho, Seattle; Crackle & Pop!, Seattle
- Genre: Alternative rock
- Length: 34:39
- Label: Sub Pop
- Producer: Johnny Sangster

Mudhoney chronology
Vanishing Point (2013)	Digital Garbage (2018)	Plastic Eternity (2023)

Digital Garbage is the tenth studio album by American rock band Mudhoney. It was released on September 28, 2018. This is their seventh studio album release on Sub Pop.

== Critical reception ==
Professional ratings
Review scores
Source	Rating
AllMusic	4/5 stars
ClashMusic	8/10
Exclaim!	9/10
MusicOMH	4.5/5 stars
Pitchfork	7.1/10
PopMatters	7/10
The Quietus	4/5 stars
Rolling Stone	3.5/5 stars

Digital Garbage received generally positive reviews from most music critics. At Metacritic, they assign a "weighted average" score out of 100 to reviews and ratings from mainstream critics, and the album received a score of 75, based on 17 reviews. AllMusic's Mark Deming affirmed that "Digital Garbage isn't quite Mudhoney's great protest album, but as a reaction to a chaotic and divisive time, it's powerfully eloquent in its own grimy way, and it shows they can still sound like nothing but themselves without being tethered to the past. Come for the rage on Digital Garbage and stay for the rock. Both feel intense and purifying."

AllMusic chose it as one of their favorite rock albums of 2018, and Mojo listed it No. 55 on its list of top 75 albums of 2018.

== Track listing ==
All tracks written by Mark Arm, Steve Turner, Dan Peters, and Guy Maddison.

No.	Title	Length
1.	"Nerve Attack"	2:45
2.	"Paranoid Core"	2:31
3.	"Please Mister Gunman"	3:30
4.	"Kill Yourself Live"	4:48
5.	"Night and Fog"	4:04
6.	"21st Century Pharisees"	2:35
7.	"Hey Neanderfuck"	2:40
8.	"Prosperity Gospel"	3:48
9.	"Messiah's Lament"	3:04
10.	"Next Mass Extinction"	3:25
11.	"Oh Yeah"	1:29
Total length:		34:39

== Personnel ==
Adapted from the album liner notes.

Mudhoney

- Mark Arm – vocals, guitar, organ
- Steve Turner – guitar, vocals
- Dan Peters – drums, percussion, guitar
- Guy Maddison – bass, synthesizer, vocals

Additional musicians

- Johnny Sangster – piano, vocals
- Kelly Van Kamp – harmonica

Technical

- Johnny Sangster – producer, engineer, mixing
- Jon Roberts – engineer
- Bob Weston – mastering
- Dusty Summers – art direction, design
- Ed Fotheringham – illustrations
- Emily Rieman – photography

== Charts ==
Chart (2018)	Peak position
Scottish Albums (Official Charts)	83
UK Independent Albums (Official Charts)	31
US Vinyl Albums (Billboard)	24
US Independent Albums (Billboard)	31
US Heatseekers Albums (Billboard)	16
