= Superfuzz Bigmuff =

- Original cover

Studio album by Mudhoney
- Released: October 1988
- Recorded: July 22–24, August 6, 15, 21, 25 and September 29, 1988
- Studios: Reciprocal Recording, Seattle, Washington
- Genres: Grunge; garage punk
- Length: 23:04
- Labels: Sub Pop (USA); Au Go Go (Australia); Glitterhouse (Germany)
- Producer: Jack Endino

Mudhoney chronology
Superfuzz Bigmuff (1988)	Boiled Beef & Rotting Teeth (1989)

Superfuzz Bigmuff is the debut EP and first major release by the Seattle grunge band Mudhoney. It was released in October 1988, through record label Sub Pop. The album was later re-released in 1990 in the form of Superfuzz Bigmuff Plus Early Singles.

== Background and writing ==
The album was named after two of the band's favorite guitar effects pedals: the Univox Super-Fuzz and the Electro-Harmonix Big Muff, which helped to provide the band's signature "dirty" sound.

Guitarist Steve Turner considers the release to be Mudhoney's first official studio album, despite it being an EP initially.

During the writing process, some of the songs were named after a band that inspired it or whose material the song resembled. For instance, "No One Has" was originally called "The Wipers Song." As Turner put it, "all these songs came together so quickly, there wasn't a whole lot of thought, but usually in my mind, I always try to think of something that I think it sounds like... Like, you know, 'What are we accidentally ripping off?' if you will. And sometimes it's like, 'Great, we're ripping it off. Cool.'"

Singer-guitarist Mark Arm has described "Chain that Door" as "a kind of an homage to [Australian band] Feedtime," while Turner has stated that it was influenced by the Meat Puppets song "Split Myself in Two" from Meat Puppets II.

The band approached "In 'n' Out of Grace" as a direct homage to Blue Cheer's debut studio album Vincebus Eruptum, even initially naming the song "The Blue Cheer Song." According to Arm, the song's "bass and drum break" and "dual out of tune guitar solo" were particularly inspired by the album. "In 'n' Out of Grace" opens with a sample of the eulogy from Peter Fonda's character in the 1966 movie The Wild Angels, saying "We wanna be free to do what we wanna do…"; a similar sample was later used on Primal Scream's song "Loaded", and also a refraining soundbite and quote in the 2013 film The World's End.

== Cover ==
The cover artwork is a photograph of frontman Mark Arm (left) and guitarist Steve Turner (right) performing live by photographer Charles Peterson. Other artwork on the album includes more photos of the band performing and them posing topless.

== Reception and legacy ==
Professional ratings
Review scores
Source	Rating
AllMusic	4.5/5 stars
Mojo	5/5 stars
NME	8/10
The Observer	4/5 stars
Pitchfork	9.1/10
PopMatters	9/10
Record Collector	5/5 stars
The Rolling Stone Album Guide	4/5 stars
Spin Alternative Record Guide	8/10
Uncut	5/5 stars

During initial release, the EP proved a success for Sub Pop, becoming one of the labels biggest selling early releases, alongside Nirvana's Bleach and Mudhoney's Debut LP. Bruce Pavitt, co-founder of Sub Pop, commented in 1993: “If Superfuzz Bigmuff hadn’t been on the U.K. charts for a year and Mudhoney hadn’t been a big sensation, who knows what would have happened to Nirvana?” It has since been acknowledged as one of the seminal records of the Seattle scene. In mid-2008 the EP charted at #25 on the UK Indie Album Chart, a peak for the album, twenty years after its release.

Along with Mudhoney's second album Every Good Boy Deserves Fudge, it was included in 1001 Albums You Must Hear Before You Die. In its review, Jamie Gonzalo called it "sexy, smart, humorous and hard", as well as writing "[Mudhoney] emerged from the underground with this mischievous workout, achieving tense and dramatic musical structures with Turner's scalping guitars, Mark Arm's angry vocals, Matt Lukin's mighty bass and Dan Peters' propulsive drums." Kurt Cobain listed the EP in his top fifty albums of all time. Krist Novoselic said in 1993: "When that EP came out it was a must-have, and those were magical times. That was the Seattle scene."

== Track listing ==
Adapted from the album liner notes.

=== Original release (1988) ===
All tracks are written by Mudhoney (Mark Arm, Steve Turner, Matt Lukin, Dan Peters).

No.	Title	Length
1.	"Need"	2:58
2.	"Chain That Door"	1:51
3.	"Mudride"	5:44
4.	"No One Has"	3:26
5.	"If I Think"	3:37
6.	"In 'n' Out of Grace"	5:28
Total length:		23:04

=== Superfuzz Bigmuff Plus Early Singles (1990) ===
All tracks are written by Mudhoney, except where noted.

No.	Title	Writer(s)	Origin	Length
1.	"Touch Me I'm Sick"		Non-album single, 1988	2:35
2.	"Sweet Young Thing Ain't Sweet No More"		B-side of "Touch Me I'm Sick"	3:46
3.	"Hate the Police"	Dicks	Mondo Stereo, 1988 (*)	2:08
4.	"Burn It Clean"		B-side of "You Got It (Keep It Outta My Face)", 1989	3:00
5.	"You Got It (Keep It Outta My Face)"		A-side of "You Got It (Keep It Outta My Face)"	2:53
6.	"Halloween"	Sonic Youth	Split single with Sonic Youth, 1990	6:12
7.	"No One Has"		Superfuzz Bigmuff	3:26
8.	"If I Think"		Superfuzz Bigmuff	3:37
9.	"In 'n' Out of Grace"		Superfuzz Bigmuff	5:28
10.	"Need"		Superfuzz Bigmuff	3:00
11.	"Chain That Door"		Superfuzz Bigmuff	1:51
12.	"Mudride"		Superfuzz Bigmuff	5:43
Total length:				43:39

=== Superfuzz Bigmuff deluxe edition (2008) ===
All tracks are written by Mudhoney, except where noted.

Disc 1
No.	Title	Writer(s)	Origin	Length
1.	"Touch Me I'm Sick"		Non-album single	2:35
2.	"Sweet Young Thing Ain't Sweet No More"		B-side of "Touch Me I'm Sick"	3:46
3.	"Twenty Four"		Dope-Guns-'n-Fucking in the Streets Volume One, 1988 (*)	2:46
4.	"Need"		Superfuzz Bigmuff	3:01
5.	"Chain That Door"		Superfuzz Bigmuff	1:51
6.	"Mudride"		Superfuzz Bigmuff	5:43
7.	"No One Has"		Superfuzz Bigmuff	3:26
8.	"If I Think"		Superfuzz Bigmuff	3:37
9.	"In 'n' Out of Grace"		Superfuzz Bigmuff	5:28
10.	"The Rose"	Amanda McBroom	Sub Pop 200, 1988 (*)	4:04
11.	"Hate the Police"	Dicks	Mondo Stereo (*)	2:09
12.	"You Got It (Keep It Outta My Face)"		A-Side of "You Got It (Keep It Outta My Face)", 1989	2:55
13.	"Burn It Clean"		B-side of "You Got It (Keep It Outta My Face)	2:58
14.	"Halloween"	Sonic Youth	Split single with Sonic Youth	6:12
15.	"Need" (demo)			3:23
16.	"Mudride" (demo)			6:03
17.	"In 'n' Out of Grace" (demo)			4:53

- Tracks 15–17 recorded April–May 1988, mixed November 2007 by Johnny Sangster.
- Releases marked with an asterisk (*) are various artists compilation albums.

Disc 2
No.	Title	Length
1.	"No One Has" (live)	3:59
2.	"Sweet Young Thing Ain't Sweet No More" (live)	3:45
3.	"Need" (live)	2:47
4.	"Chain That Door" (live)	1:59
5.	"If I Think" (live)	3:18
6.	"Mudride" (live)	6:20
7.	"Here Comes the Sickness" (live)	4:12
8.	"Touch Me I'm Sick" (live)	2:51
9.	"In 'n' Out of Grace" (live)	6:55
10.	"Mudride" (live)	5:34
11.	"Here Comes the Sickness" (live)	4:10
12.	"No One Has" (live)	3:32
13.	"By Her Own Hand" (live)	3:32
14.	"Touch Me I'm Sick" (live)	3:14
15.	"Dead Love" (live)	14:18

- Tracks 1–9 recorded live at the Metropol in Berlin, 10 October 1988, and tracks 10–15 broadcast live at KCSB-FM, Santa Barbara, 16 November 1988. Tracks 1–9 mixed November 2007 by Johnny Sangster.

== Personnel ==
Adapted from the album liner notes.

Mudhoney

- Mark Arm – vocals, guitar
- Steve Turner – guitar, backing vocals
- Matt Lukin – bass
- Dan Peters – drums

Technical personnel

- Jack Endino – producer, engineer, mixing
- Charles Peterson – photography

== Charts ==
Chart (1989)	Peak position
UK Indie Chart	3
