= Bundle of Hiss =

American grunge band

- Origin: Seattle, Washington, U.S.
- Genres: Hard rock, grunge, heavy metal
- Years active: 1980–1988
- Label: Loveless
- Past members: Jamie Lane; Kurt Danielson; Dan Peters; Russ Bartlett; Kurt Schonberg; Jeff Hopper

Bundle of Hiss was an American grunge band formed in 1980 in Stanwood, Washington by future Tad member Kurt Danielson, guitarist Jeff Hopper, vocalist Kurt Schonberg and drummer Russ Bartlett.

== History ==
Schonberg left the band after recording demo tapes and was replaced by Bartlett on vocals. The band featured various drummers before finding Dan Peters. Hopper later left the band and was replaced by Jamie Lane, who had met Kurt Danielson at the University of Washington.

In 1986, Russ Bartlett left the band to pursue a solo career. Jamie Lane then took up vocals and guitar. The band recorded demo tapes and passed them on to fans at their shows and fellow Seattle bands, such as Soundgarden, Mudhoney, and Melvins. In 1988, the group officially disbanded. Kurt Danielson formed his new band, Tad, with former drummer Tad Doyle. Dan Peters became the drummer in another local band, Feast, which disbanded shortly after he joined. After Feast broke up, Peters formed Mudhoney with Mark Arm and Steve Turner. In 2000, Bundle of Hiss re-released an old demo tape on Loveless Records called Sessions: 1986-1988.

== Influences ==
Bundle of Hiss cited influences including Jimi Hendrix, Led Zeppelin, Black Sabbath, the Stooges, Gang of Four and Joy Division.
