= Tomorrow Hit Today =

Studio album by Mudhoney
- Released: September 22, 1998
- Recorded: January 7–17; February 5–12, 1998
- Studios: Studio Litho, Seattle; Ardent, Memphis
- Genres: Grunge; punk blues
- Length: 43:22
- Label: Reprise
- Producers: Jim Dickinson, Mudhoney

Mudhoney chronology
My Brother the Cow (1995)	Tomorrow Hit Today (1998)	Since We've Become Translucent (2002)

Singles from Tomorrow Hit Today
- 1. "Night of the Hunted" Released: 1998

Professional ratings
Review scores
Source	Rating
AllMusic	3.5/5 stars
Kerrang!	3/5 stars
NME	5/10
Pitchfork	6.8/10
Rolling Stone	4/5 stars

Tomorrow Hit Today is the fifth studio album by American rock band Mudhoney. It was released by Reprise Records on September 22, 1998. Barely selling 11,000 copies on its release this would be the last album the band would release with Reprise as well as a major label. Although the band retains their grunge sound on the album, a noticeable garage and blues influence can be heard. The album title is a reference to a song, "When Tomorrow Hits", off of their eponymous debut. This is also the last album to feature bass player Matt Lukin. The album was released on CD through Reprise and on Vinyl through Superelectro Sound Recordings. The album also gained a cassette release on the Philippines. In 2018, the album was re-released on blue vinyl to celebrate its 20th anniversary.

In 2020, Tomorrow Hit Today was included in the 4CD box set Real Low Vibe: Reprise Recordings 1992-1998.

Three singles were released from the album, a limited 7" of Night Of The Hunted via Super Electro Recordings, a promotional CD for Ghost and a radio-only CD-R for This Is The Life.

== Track listing ==
Adapted from the album liner notes.

All tracks composed by Mudhoney, except where noted

1. "A Thousand Forms of Mind" – 4:43
2. "I Have to Laugh" – 3:29
3. "Oblivion" – 3:26
4. "Try to Be Kind" – 2:55
5. "Poisoned Water" – 2:45
6. "Real Low Vibe" – 2:55
7. "This Is the Life" – 3:32
8. "Night of the Hunted" – 3:05
9. "Move with the Wind" – 3:49
10. "Ghost" (Cheater Slicks) – 4:33
11. "I Will Fight No More Forever" – 2:54

12.1 "Beneath the Valley of the Underdog" – 5:16
12.2 "Talkin' Randy Tate's Specter Blues" (hidden track) (Traditional, arranged by Mudhoney and Jim Dickinson) – 1:22

- The hidden track at the end of track 12 (after 2 minutes of silence) is not listed in the track listing but is mentioned in the liner notes, which credit it as traditional. However, Steve Turner has confirmed that he and Arm actually wrote it. Total length of track 12 is 8:39.

== Personnel ==
Adapted from the album liner notes.

=== Mudhoney ===
- Mark Arm – vocals, guitar, organ
- Steve Turner – guitar
- Matt Lukin – bass guitar
- Dan Peters – drums, percussion

=== Additional personnel ===
- Jim Dickinson – additional keyboards, producer.
- Adam Kasper – engineer (Studio Litho)
- Matt Bayles – assistant engineer (Studio Litho)
- John Hampton – engineer (Ardent)
- Pete Mathews – assistant engineer (Ardent)
- David Bianco – mixing (at Royal Tone, Los Angeles, March 24–31, 1998, and at Track Record, North Hollywood, April 1–3, 1998)
- Mudhoney (Mark, Steve and Dan) – mixing
- Jeff Thomas – assistant mixing engineer (Royal Tone)
- Mike Ainsworth – assistant mixing engineer (Track Record)
- Hank Trotter – art direction
- David Belisle – photography
