= Under a Billion Suns =

Studio album by Mudhoney
- Released: 7 March 2006
- Recorded: 3 June – 3 July 2005. Horns recorded 5 July, 7 July, 26 September 2005
- Studios: Avast!, Seattle; Flora Avenue, Seattle; Mushroom, Vancouver
- Genre: Alternative rock
- Length: 43:50
- Label: Sub Pop
- Producers: Phil Ek; Johnny Sangster; Tucker Martine

Mudhoney chronology
Since We've Become Translucent (2002)	Under a Billion Suns (2006)	The Lucky Ones (2008)

Singles from Under a Billion Suns
- 1. "It Is Us" Released: May 7, 2006

Professional ratings
Review scores
Source	Rating
AllMusic	4/5 stars
Alternative Press	4/5 stars
Drowned in Sound	8/10
Entertainment Weekly	B
Pitchfork	6.1/10
PopMatters	7/10 stars
Punknews.org	3/5 stars
Slant	2.5/5 stars

Under a Billion Suns is the seventh studio album by American rock band Mudhoney, released in the United States on March 7, 2006. The album further departed from grunge and continued a more commercial direction that began with their previous album Since We've Become Translucent. Of note is the unusual amount of saxophones and trumpets featured on the album. A few of the songs also feature female backing vocals. It was recorded with three producers: Phil Ek, Johnny Sangster and Tucker Martine.

The first few hundred copies pre-ordered from Sub Pop were autographed by the band, and came with a bonus CD featuring demos and remixes. The song "Empty Shells" was featured on the "NHL 2K7" video game.

== Writing and recording ==
Like on their previous album, Since We've Become Translucent, the band chose to work with three different producers over three weekends. In early June 2005 they recorded four tracks with Phil Ek at Avast! Recording Company in Seattle, then three tracks in mid-June with Johnny Sangster at Mushroom Studios in Vancouver (a fourth track was recorded but not used). Then early July they recorded the last four tracks at Tucker Martine's Flora Avenue Studio in Seattle.

The album includes backing vocals from Christy McWilson and Amy Allison on "Let's Drop In" and "I Saw the Light". Before the album was released co-founder of Sub Pop records Jonathan Poneman said that the album is more political than typical Mudhoney albums, while vocalist Mark Arm said, "That may be a little exaggerated. There are four songs where those things are touched on. It's more kind of mocking than the stark, black or white approach." The song "Hard on for War" was written around the time of the U.S.'s 2003 invasion of Iraq. Although songs like "On the Move," and "I Saw the Light" had been appearing in Mudhoney's live shows, Arm said the band wasn't particularly looking to fine-tune the material before it hit the studio.

Although the song "Hard on for War" was written around the time of the U.S.'s 2003 invasion of Iraq, and had been appearing in Mudhoney's live shows with songs like "On the Move," and "I Saw the Light", Arm said the band wasn't particularly looking to fine-tune the material before it hit the studio.

When asked to rank the band's albums in 2018, guitarist Steve Turner ranked Under a Billion Suns as his least favorite Mudhoney album. He stated that "This sounds bad, but I think we were overambitious and there were maybe too many people involved."

== Track listing ==
All songs are composed by Mudhoney.

1. "Where Is the Future?" - 5:38
2. "It Is Us" - 3:28
3. "I Saw the Light" - 2:23
4. "Endless Yesterday" - 4:02
5. "Empty Shells" - 2:38
6. "Hard-On for War" - 3:57
7. "A Brief Celebration of Indifference" - 2:06
8. "Let's Drop In" - 4:40
9. "On the Move" - 4:46
10. "In Search Of..." - 5:02
11. "Blindspots" - 5:37

Pre-order bonus disc

1. "Where Is the Future?" (remix by Tucker Martine) - 8:01
2. "Hard-On for War" (rough mix with horns) - 4:03
3. "Dig Those Trenches" (unreleased) - 3:27
4. "On the Move" (Johnny Sangster version) - 4:50
5. "It Is Us" (rough mix with horns) - 3:31
6. "Blindspots" (rough mix with original horns) - 4:53

== Personnel ==
Adapted from the album liner notes.

Mudhoney

- Mark Arm – vocals, guitar, synthesizer (5), cover photography
- Steve Turner – guitar, synthesizer (5), backing vocals (2, 3, 5, 11)
- Guy Maddison – bass
- Dan Peters – drums, percussion

Additional musicians

- Hans Teuber – alto saxophone (1, 2, 11)
- Saul Cline – tenor saxophone (1)
- Jay Thomas – tenor saxophone (8, 11)
- Craig Flory – baritone saxophone (1, 2, 8, 11), tenor saxophone (11), horn arrangements (1, 2, 8, 11)
- Dave Carter – trumpet (1, 2, 8, 11)
- Steve Moore – trombone (1, 2, 8, 11)
- Greg Powers – trombone (11)
- Amy Allison – backing vocals (3, 8)
- Christy McWilson – backing vocals (3, 8)

Technical

- Tucker Martine – producer, engineer, mixing (1, 4, 7, 10); treatments (1, 10)
- Phil Ek – producer, engineer, mixing (2, 5, 6, 9)
- Johnny Sangster – producer, engineer, mixing (3, 8, 11)
- Donn Devore – assistant engineer (2, 5, 6, 9)
- Shawn Penner – assistant engineer (3, 8, 11)
- Roger Seibel – mastering
- Jeff Kleinsmith – design
- Steve Gullick – photography
- Steven Dewall – photography
