= The Lucky Ones (Mudhoney album) =

Studio album by Mudhoney
- Released: 20 May 2008
- Recorded: September 6–10, 2007
- Studios: Studio Litho, Seattle
- Genres: Alternative rock; grunge
- Length: 36:17
- Label: Sub Pop
- Producer: Tucker Martine

Mudhoney chronology
Under a Billion Suns (2006)	The Lucky Ones (2008)	Vanishing Point (2013)

Professional ratings
Review scores
Source	Rating
AllMusic	4/5 stars
The Guardian	4/5 stars
musicOMH	4/5 stars
Pitchfork Media	7.2/10
PopMatters	6/10 stars

The Lucky Ones is the eighth studio album by American rock band Mudhoney, released on Sub Pop Records on May 20, 2008.

== Writing and recording ==
The band has said that the album was written "from the rhythm up instead of from the riff and the lyrics down" and has also stated that it's the quickest album they recorded. As singer and rhythm guitarist Mark Arm has said, "The effect is to thrust out the bottom-end rumble of drummer Dan Peters and bassist Guy Maddison, and to bring about a cohesive whole not entirely ruled by the almighty riff—although you certainly don't have to look hard to find 'em." Rather spontaneously, the veterans recorded the eleven songs found on the record in only three and a half days, including overdubs. The ninth track on the album is titled "Tales of Terror" in honor of the Sacramento hardcore punk band Tales of Terror that influenced and inspired the grunge movement.

It is the only Mudhoney album to not feature Arm as second guitarist. Main guitarist Steve Turner said in 2018, "I liked how sparse this record was... we wrote these songs fast and they just seemed like they didn't need a second guitar."

== Track listing ==
All tracks are written by Mudhoney, except where noted.

1. "I'm Now" - 2:40
2. "Inside Out Over You" - 3:25
3. "The Lucky Ones" - 4:52
4. "Next Time" - 3:01
5. "And the Shimmering Light" - 3:05
6. "The Open Mind" - 2:26
7. "What's This Thing?" - 2:54
8. "Running Out" - 3:28
9. "Tales of Terror" - 3:17
10. "We Are Rising" - 4:30
11. "New Meaning" - 2:39

Vinyl edition bonus 7"

1. "Street Waves" (Pere Ubu) - 3:14 (Pere Ubu cover)
2. "Gonna Make You" (Colin Frechter, Larry Page) - 3:02 (The Troggs cover)
- 7" recorded and mixed at Electrokitty, Seattle, by Johnny Sangster.

== Personnel ==
Mudhoney

- Mark Arm – vocals
- Steve Turner – guitar
- Dan Peters – drums
- Guy Maddison – bass

Technical

- Tucker Martine – production, engineer, mixing
- Floyd Reitsma – assistant engineer
- Bill Inglot – mastering
- Dave Schultz – mastering
- Jeff Kleinsmith – art direction, design
- Ed Fotheringham – cover painting
