= Vanishing Point (Mudhoney album) =

2013 album

Studio album by Mudhoney
- Released: April 2, 2013
- Recorded: April, September, October 2012
- Studios: Avast! Studio B, Seattle; Crackle & Pop!, Seattle
- Genre: Alternative rock
- Length: 34:06
- Language: English
- Label: Sub Pop

Mudhoney chronology
The Lucky Ones (2008)	Vanishing Point (2013)	Digital Garbage (2018)

Vanishing Point is the ninth studio album by American rock band Mudhoney. It was released on April 2, 2013, as their sixth studio album release on Sub Pop.

== Critical reception ==
Professional ratings
Review scores
Source	Rating
AllMusic	4/5 stars
Blurt	4/5 stars
Consequence of Sound	3/5 stars
Drowned in Sound	8/10
Mojo	4/5 stars
musicOMH	4/5 stars
NME	8/10
Pitchfork	7.4/10
Q	4/5 stars
Uncut	8/10
Under the Radar	3.5/10 stars

Vanishing Point received generally positive reviews from most music critics. At Metacritic, they assign a "weighted average" score out of 100 to reviews and ratings from mainstream critics, and the album received a Metascore of 76, based on 20 reviews. AllMusic's Stephen Thomas Erlewine affirmed that this is "a Mudhoney album through and through", which contains "no outright surprises sonically, but beneath the roar it's hard not to admire how their perennial piss-takes are subtly deepening and how their saturated superfuzz always sounds so good." At Blurt, Mike Shanley evoked that "Mudhoney shows no sign of either calming down or tinkering with a good formula." Marc Burrows of Drowned in Sound alluded to how that "while it's very much business as usual [...] groove-led-Stooges-acid-pop with added screaming [...] it sounds so gloriously Mudhoney it offers a thrill akin to Popping Candy fizzing in My Little Pony blood."

Martyn Young of musicOMH proclaimed that the release "is such a vibrant and quintessential Mudhoney album makes it a real triumph." At Mojo, Stevie Chick called it the "best of the bunch". NME's Thom Gibbs claimed that the band was "putting the fun in grunge since 1988, Mudhoney drink from the familiar well of Iggy on their ninth album with outrageously enjoyable results." Andrew Perry of Q found that the band are "pissed off, over-amped, just the right side of sloppy, shorn of the brass grafted into recent outings", which is "exactly like themselves." At Uncut, Peter Watts told that the release "is a riot of dirty [...] yet never cluttered" that contains "Detroit riffs and Mark Arm's laconically enrage vocals."

However, Matt Melis of Consequence of Sound stated that Mudhoney is "maturing without growing up," but this only "works here on a handful of tracks", which is because the album is "cleaning up the band’s early fuzz without sacrificing their trademark youthful irreverence." At Under the Radar, Dan Lucas noted how "Vanishing Point is a reflection of the band's current creative mindset", and told that "what little credit can be afforded Vanishing Point is due to the album's lack of pretention", which is not very much because the listener needs only to "think Ash covering Nirvana and you'll have an idea of just how bad an idea this album is."

== Track listing ==
All tracks written by Mark Arm, Steve Turner, Dan Peters, and Guy Maddison.

No.	Title	Length
1.	"Slipping Away"	4:44
2.	"I Like It Small"	3:39
3.	"What to Do with the Neutral"	3:29
4.	"Chardonnay"	1:39
5.	"The Final Course"	4:19
6.	"In This Rubber Tomb"	3:33
7.	"I Don't Remember You"	2:35
8.	"The Only Son of the Widow from Nain"	2:45
9.	"Sing This Song of Joy"	3:32
10.	"Douchebags on Parade"	3:51
Total length:		34:06

== Personnel ==
Adapted from the album liner notes.

Mudhoney

- Mark Arm – vocals, guitar (1, 2, 6), slide guitar (10)
- Steve Turner – guitar, backing vocals (1, 2, 7)
- Dan Peters – drums, guitar (2), tambourine (2, 3, 7, 9), glockenspiel (2), backing vocals (2)
- Guy Maddison – bass, backing vocals (2)

Additional personnel

- Johnny Sangster – engineer, mixing, piano (2), backing vocals (2)
- Ty Bailie – organ (2, 9), clavinet (3)
- Ivan Schwartz – synthesizers (5, 6), theremin (5)
- Lacey Swain – backing vocals (2, 7)
- Emily Nokes – backing vocals (2, 7)
- Leiah Maupin – backing vocals (2, 7)
- Sam Peters – backing vocals (2)
- Will Peters – backing vocals (2)
- Bob Weston – mastering
- Emily Rieman – photography, backing vocals (2, 7)
- Jeff Kleinsmith – art direction

== Charts ==
Chart (2013)	Peak position
US Heatseekers Albums (Billboard)	9
US Independent Albums (Billboard)	47
US Indie Store Album Sales (Billboard)	13
