= Since We've Become Translucent =

Studio album by Mudhoney
- Released: August 20, 2002
- Recorded: April 4, 2000–February 23, 2002
- Studios: Jupiter; Egg; Gravelvoice; Private Radio; (Seattle)
- Genre: Alternative rock
- Length: 46:34
- Label: Sub Pop
- Producers: Mudhoney; Johnny Sangster; Martin Feveyear; Scott Colburn; Jack Endino

Mudhoney chronology
| Tomorrow Hit Today (1998) | Since We've Become Translucent (2002) | Under a Billion Suns (2006) |

Singles from Since We've Become Translucent
- 1. "Sonic Infusion" Released: 2002

Professional ratings
Review scores
| Source | Rating |
|---|---|
| AllMusic | 4/5 stars |
| Pitchfork | 5.2/10 |
| Rolling Stone | 3/5 stars |

Since We've Become Translucent is the sixth studio album by American rock band Mudhoney, released in 2002. The album was the first to be recorded after the departure of their original bassist Matt Lukin, three years earlier. It was also the first to be released through Sub Pop after the band returned to the label.

Since We've Become Translucent marked a prominent change in the band's sound. The album departed from their typical grunge sound and features a relatively accessible rock sound. However, on tracks such as "Baby, Can You Dig the Light?", psychedelica, synthpop, and jazz are explored.

The bulk of the album was recorded over three weekends with three different producers – Johnny Sangster, Martin Feveyear and Scott Colburn – between November 2001 and February 2002. The band focused on three songs at a time, which they rehearsed and recorded before moving on to the next songs. This approach would also be used on the band's next album Under a Billion Suns. One track, "Inside Job", was recorded with Jack Endino in a single day in April 2000 with former MC5 Wayne Kramer on bass, before new bassist Guy Maddison joined the band in 2001.

== Track listing ==
All tracks are written by Mudhoney

1. "Baby, Can You Dig the Light?" - 8:26
2. "The Straight Life" - 3:33
3. "Where the Flavor Is" - 3:34
4. "In the Winner's Circle" - 4:27
5. "Our Time Is Now" - 3:39
6. "Dyin' for It" - 4:54
7. "Inside Job" - 2:52
8. "Take It Like a Man" - 2:35
9. "Crooked and Wide" - 4:54
10. "Sonic Infusion" - 7:40

== Personnel ==
Mudhoney

- Mark Arm – vocals, guitar (except 8), organ (1, 6), piano (3, 8), backing vocals (4, 8)
- Steve Turner – guitar, backing vocals (2, 4, 5, 8)
- Guy Maddison – bass guitar (except 7)
- Dan Peters – drums

Additional personnel

- Craig Flory – tenor saxophone (1, 3, 8), baritone saxophone (3, 8), horn arrangements (3, 8)
- Jeff McGrath – trumpet (3, 8)
- Greg Powers – trombone (3, 8)
- Wayne Kramer – bass guitar (7)
- Jo Claxton – violin (10)
- Miho Takekawa – vibraphone (10)
- Johnny Sangster – backing vocals (2, 5), producer, engineer, mixing (2, 5, 6)
- Martin Feveyear – backing vocals (8), producer, engineer, mixing (1, 3, 8)
- Scott Colburn – infused sonics (10), producer, engineer, mixing (4, 9, 10)
- Julian Martlew – backing vocals (4), assistant engineer, mixing assistant (4, 9, 10)
- Jack Endino – producer, engineer, mixing (7)
- Steve Hall – mastering
- Jeff Kleinsmith – design
- Jesse LeDoux – design
- Lance Hammond – cover photos
- Emily Rieman – inside photo

== Chart ==
Chart performance for Since We've Become Translucent
| Chart (2002) | Peak position |
|---|---|
| UK Independent Albums (Official Charts) | 44 |
| UK Rock & Metal Albums (Official Charts) | 32 |
