= Piece of Cake (album) =

Studio album by Mudhoney
- Released: October 13, 1992
- Recorded: July 1992
- Studio: Egg
- Genres: Grunge; garage punk
- Length: 44:33
- Label: Reprise
- Producers: Conrad Uno, Mudhoney

Mudhoney chronology
Every Good Boy Deserves Fudge (1991)	Piece of Cake (1992)	My Brother the Cow (1995)

Singles from Piece of Cake
- 1. "Suck You Dry" Released: October 12, 1992; 2. "Blinding Sun" Released: 1993

Piece of Cake is the third studio album by American rock band Mudhoney. Released in 1992, it was the band's first album for Reprise Records. The album was released at the height of grunge, a genre Mudhoney had helped create.

The album peaked at No. 189 on the Billboard 200. The band supported it with a North American tour that included shows with Eugenius. "Suck You Dry" and "Blinding Sun" were released as singles.

Reprise reissued the album in 2003, bundled with the E.P. Five Dollar Bob's Mock Cooter Stew and the b-sides from the singles. In 2020, Piece of Cake was included in the 4CD box set Real Low Vibe: Reprise Recordings 1992-1998.

== Recording and production ==
Recorded at Seattle's Egg Studios, the album was produced by Conrad Uno and the band. Mudhoney spent $15,000 to record it; unlike previous albums, the band completed it at one time, instead of spending non-consecutive weeks in the studio. Reprise granted Mudhoney full artistic freedom in the making of Piece of Cake.

Mudhoney reserved four of the album's tracks for each individual band member to do what he saw fit. "Youth Body Expression Explosion" is an instrumental track. The band used an organ on many of the songs. Piece of Cake was the first Mudhoney album that bass player Matt Lukin was satisfied with.

== Critical reception ==
Professional ratings
Review scores
Source	Rating
AllMusic	3/5 stars
Calgary Herald	A−
The Indianapolis Star	3/4 stars
Los Angeles Times	3/4 stars
Rolling Stone	2/5 stars
Toronto Sun	2/5 stars

The Toronto Star wrote that the songs "are leavened with hooks and humor, and mostly free of extraneous axework." The Calgary Herald determined that "it takes time to grow on you because [Mudhoney] eschews more over-the-top metal influences in favor of punkish garage-rock glory." The Toronto Sun opined that "the majority of the 13 songs sound artlessly tossed together, as though the group felt a lack of effort, in and of itself, somehow constituted a statement about signing with a big corporation."

The Washington Post concluded: "Where other Seattle bands seem to embrace going under, this one fights back ... Mudhoney is too noisy, too punchy and just plain too contrary to curl up and die." The Indianapolis Star stated that, "in his minor-key yelp, Mark Arm frequently equates love with death ... Some listeners may be reminded of a similar album thematically, X's Under the Big Black Sun."

The Rocky Mountain News listed Piece of Cake as the sixth best album of 1992. Spin included the album on its list of the 20 best records of the year.

== Track listing ==
All tracks are written by Mudhoney, except where noted.

1. "[Untitled 1]" – 0:38
2. "No End in Sight" – 3:34
3. "Make It Now" – 4:25
4. "When in Rome" – 3:55
5. "[Untitled 2]" – 0:25
6. "Suck You Dry" – 2:34
7. "Blinding Sun" – 3:39
8. "Thirteenth Floor Opening" – 2:31
9. "Youth Body Expression Explosion" – 1:59
10. "I'm Spun" – 4:04
11. "[Untitled 3]" – 0:40
12. "Take Me There" – 3:32
13. "Living Wreck" – 3:30
14. "Let Me Let You Down" – 3:57
15. "[Untitled 4]" – 0:29
16. "Ritzville" – 2:38
17. "Acetone" – 4:15

2003 reissue bonus tracks

18. "Over the Top" (Lemmy Kilmister, Eddie Clarke, Phil Taylor)– 2:35 *
19. "King Sandbox" – 2:43 **
20. "Baby o Baby" (Martin Rev) – 3:45 **
21. "In the Blood" – 3:08 ***
22. "No Song III" – 4:11 ***
23. "Between Me and You Kid" – 3:38 ***
24. "Six Two One" – 2:34 ***
25. "Make It Now Again" – 4:35 ***
26. "Deception Pass" – 2:54 ***/*/**
27. "Underide" – 2:07 ***/*
- * originally appeared as a B-Side to "Suck You Dry" (1992)
- ** originally appeared as a B-Side to "Blinding Sun" (1993)
- *** originally appeared on the E.P. Five Dollar Bob's Mock Cooter Stew (1993)
- Tracks 21–25 recorded August 1, 1993, at Hanszek Audio, Ballard, Washington. Produced by Kurt Bloch and Mudhoney, engineered by Kurt Bloch.
- Tracks 26 and 27 recorded at Egg Studios with Conrad Uno, 1992.

== Personnel ==
Adapted from the album liner notes.

Mudhoney

- Mark Arm – vocals, guitar, organ, slide guitar, piano
- Steve Turner – guitar, key bass, harmonica, banjo, vocals
- Dan Peters – drums, marimba, vocals
- Matt Lukin – bass guitar, vocals

Additional musicians

- Conrad Uno – backing vocals (8, 12, 13, 17)
- Emily Bishton – additional "ooohs" (14)
- The Fresh Mud Choir (Scott McCaughey, Tad Hutchison, Bob Whittaker, Steve Turner, Matt Lukin) – additional background vocals, handclaps (4, 16, 26)
- Ken Stringfellow – organ (20)

Technical

- Conrad Uno – producer, engineer
- Mudhoney – producer
- Art Chantry – design
- Ed Fotheringham – cover illustration

== Chart positions ==
=== Album ===
Chart (1992)	Peak position
Official UK Charts	39
US Heatseekers	9
US Billboard Top 200	189

=== Singles ===
Year	Single	Chart	Peak
1992	"Suck You Dry"	US Modern Rock Tracks	23
