= March to Fuzz =

Compilation album by Mudhoney
- Released: January 2000
- Recorded: 1988–2000
- Genre: Grunge, garage punk, hardcore punk, punk rock
- Label: Sub Pop
- Producer: Various

Mudhoney chronology
Tomorrow Hit Today (1998)	March to Fuzz (2000)	Here Comes Sickness: The Best of the BBC (2000)

Professional ratings
Review scores
Source	Rating
Allmusic	4.5/5 stars
BBC	(Favorable)
Kerrang!	4/5 stars
Pitchfork Media	7.5/10 stars
PopMatters	(Favorable)

March to Fuzz is a compilation album by American rock band Mudhoney, released in January 2000 by Sub Pop Records. Disc 1 is a collection of the band's most popular songs, such as "Here Comes Sickness" and "Sweet Young Thing Ain't Sweet No More." Disc 2 is a collection of rare tracks, b-sides such as "Butterfly Stroke," and covers such as "The Money Will Roll Right In."

The booklet that comes with the digipak album features an introduction by Sub Pop co-founder Bruce Pavitt, "Corporate Associate." The remainder of the booklet includes comments by band members Mark Arm and Steve Turner about each of the 52 songs.

== Track listing ==
All tracks written by Mudhoney unless otherwise noted.

Disc 1 - Best Of

1. "In 'n' Out of Grace"
2. "Suck You Dry"
3. "I Have to Laugh"
4. "Sweet Young Thing Ain't Sweet No More"
5. "Who You Driving Now?"
6. "You Got It"
7. "Judgement, Rage, Retribution & Thyme"
8. "Into the Drink"
9. "A Thousand Forms of Mind"
10. "Generation Genocide"
11. "If I Think"
12. "Here Comes Sickness"
13. "Let It Slide"
14. "Touch Me I'm Sick"
15. "This Gift"
16. "Good Enough"
17. "Blinding Sun"
18. "Into Your Shtik"
19. "Beneath the Valley of the Underdog"
20. "When Tomorrow Hits"
21. "Make It Now Again"
22. "Hate the Police" (The Dicks)

Disc 2 - Rarities

1. "Hey Sailor"
2. "Twenty Four"
3. "Baby Help Me Forget" (Mr. Epp and the Calculations)
4. "Revolution" (Spacemen 3)
5. "You Stupid Asshole" (Angry Samoans)
6. "Who Is Who" (The Adolescents)
7. "Stab Your Back" (The Damned)
8. "Pump It Up" (Elvis Costello)
9. "The Money Will Roll Right In" (Fang)
10. "Fix Me" (Black Flag)
11. "Dehumanized" (Void)
12. "She's Just 15" (Billy Childish)
13. "Baby O Baby" (Suicide)
14. "Over the Top" (Motörhead)
15. "You Give Me the Creeps" (The Crucifucks)
16. "March to Fuzz"
17. "Ounce of Deception"
18. "Paperback Life"
19. "Bushpusher Man"
20. "Fuzzbuster"
21. "Overblown"
22. "Run Shithead Run"
23. "King Sandbox"
24. "Tonight I Think I'm Gonna Go Downtown" (Jimmie Dale Gilmore)
25. "Holden" (Jimmie Dale Gilmore/Reed)
26. "Not Going Down That Road Again"
27. "Brand New Face"
28. "Drinking for Two"
29. "Butterfly Stroke"
30. "Editions of You" (Roxy Music)
