= Superfuzz Bigmuff Plus Early Singles =

Compilation album by Mudhoney
- Released: October 25, 1990
- Recorded: 1988–1989 at Reciprocal Recording in Seattle, Washington
- Genre: Grunge; garage punk
- Length: 43:25
- Label: Sub Pop
- Producer: Jack Endino

Mudhoney chronology
Mudhoney (1989)	Superfuzz Bigmuff Plus Early Singles (1990)	Every Good Boy Deserves Fudge (1991)

Professional ratings
Review scores
Source	Rating
Allmusic	4.5/5 stars
PopMatters	9/10 stars

Superfuzz Bigmuff Plus Early Singles is a compilation album by the grunge band Mudhoney. The album contains the entire Superfuzz Bigmuff EP, the A-sides and B-sides of 2 singles, and 2 covers from split singles with Sonic Youth and The Dicks. It was released by Sub Pop Records in October 1990. The album is named after the Electro-Harmonix Big Muff Pi and the Univox Super-Fuzz fuzzboxes, (the title also being a play on words) which gave the band their signature dirty sound.

- "Touch Me I'm Sick" was Mudhoney's first single, and one of the first singles ever released by Sub Pop; "Sweet Young Thing Ain't Sweet No More" was the B-side.
- "You Got It (Keep It Outta My Face)" was released as a single in 1989; "Burn It Clean" was the B-side.
- "Hate the Police" is a cover of a song by The Dicks.
- "Halloween" is a cover of a Sonic Youth song, originally recorded for the split single between the two bands, on which Sonic Youth played "Touch Me I'm Sick."
- The last 6 tracks on the album are from Mudhoney's debut EP Superfuzz Bigmuff.

In 2005 the album was performed live in its entirety as part of the All Tomorrow's Parties-curated Don't Look Back series.

== Track listing ==
All tracks by Mudhoney unless otherwise noted.

1. "Touch Me I'm Sick" – 2:35
2. "Sweet Young Thing Ain't Sweet No More" – 3:46
3. "Hate the Police" (The Dicks cover) – 2:08
4. "Burn It Clean" – 3:00
5. "You Got It (Keep It Outta My Face)" – 2:53
6. "Halloween" (Sonic Youth cover) – 6:12
7. "No One Has" – 3:26
8. "If I Think" – 3:37
9. "In 'n' Out of Grace" – 5:28
10. "Need" – 3:00
11. "Chain That Door" – 1:51
12. "Mudride" – 5:43
