= Guy Maddison =

Australian musician (born 1965)

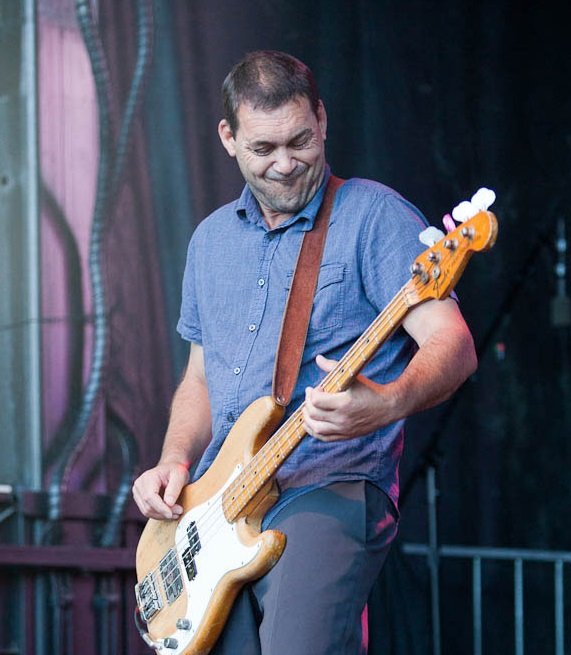
- Maddison performing with Mudhoney in 2012

Background information
- Also known as: Buster Smallgoods
- Born: Guy Bernard Maddison; 31 March 1965 (age 60); Perth, Western Australia, Australia
- Genres: Garage punk, punk rock
- Occupation(s): Musician, nurse
- Instrument(s): Bass guitar, vocals, guitar
- Years active: 1985–present
- Labels: Black Eye, Sub Pop, Amphetamine Reptile
- Member of: Mudhoney
- Formerly of: Greenhouse Effect; Lubricated Goat; the Unconscious Collective; Merge; Monroe’s Fur; Bloodloss; Bushpig; Tall Poppies; the Bricklane

Guy Bernard Maddison (born 31 March 1965) is an Australian punk and grunge musician. From 1986 to 1989 he worked as a member of noise rock group Lubricated Goat and appeared on their album Paddock of Love. He was a member of Bloodloss (1993–1997), a blues-punk band, alongside Mark Arm on vocals. From 2001 Maddison is the bass guitarist of the United States–based grunge band, Mudhoney (which includes Arm), and has worked on their studio albums, Since We've Become Translucent (2002), Under a Billion Suns (2006), The Lucky Ones (2008), Vanishing Point (2013), Digital Garbage (2018) and Plastic Eternity (2023).

== Career ==
=== 1980s ===
Guy Maddison played in mid-1980s Perth-based punk group, Greenhouse Effect, with Paul Gill on guitar and Dave Brockwell on drums. By 1986 he moved to Sydney, he played bass guitar for noise rock band Lubricated Goat, sometimes under the pseudonym Buster Smallgoods, recording one album, Paddock of Love (July 1988). In 2003 Maddison recalled meeting Stu Spasm (aka Stuart Grey) by chance, "I was crossing the road one day on Cleveland Street ... and Stuart yelled out to me ... he asked me if I was doing anything and if I’d like to play the bass in Lubricated Goat" – they had previously met when Spasm was recording tracks in Perth with an earlier version of Lubricated Goat. The line-up of Lubricated Goat for Paddock of Love, alongside Maddison on bass guitar, and Spasm on vocals, guitar, synthesiser and bass guitar; were Pete Hartley on bass guitar and guitar; and Brett Ford on drums. In November 1988 the band lip-synched a nude performance of their track, "In the Raw", on the Australian Broadcasting Corporation TV program Blah Blah Blah, an event which created national media outrage. In 2009 Cousin Creep, an alternative music journalist, directed a documentary film, In the Raw, about the event.

In May 1989 Lubricated Goat followed with an extended play, Schadenfreude with Maddison and Spasm joined by Gene Ravet on drums (ex-Ragadoll, Space Juniors) and Charlie Tolnay on guitar (Grong Grong, King Snake Roost). Front man Spasm and Maddison were the only band members to tour the United States, they enlisted tour musicians, Renestair EJ on guitar and Martin Bland on drums. Maddison was an occasional member of the improvised group, The Unconscious Collective, and the mixed media experiment, Merge. In late 1989, after the US tour, Maddison left Lubricated Goat and formed a side project with former bandmate, Hartley. The new group was Monroe's Fur. At this time, Maddison relocated to Seattle, Washington.

=== 1990s ===
In 1990 Guy Maddison was briefly a member of a studio group, Bushpig, on bass guitar and keyboards, with Tolnay (ex-Bloodloss) and Peter Hill (King Snake Roost) on vocals and harmonica. That year they issued a self-titled album on Hill's label, Practical Goat Keeping Records. In 1993, Maddison played bass guitar in the third incarnation of Bloodloss, a blues-punk band which had started in Adelaide, Australia in 1982. This version had formed in Seattle with Mark Arm of Mudhoney on vocals, and Maddison's former bandmates Renestair and Bland. In November 1995 the group issued Live My Way on Warner / Reprise Records. Australian rock music historian, Ian McFarlane, felt they "played delta blues by way of Captain Beefheart and Jon Spencer Blues Explosion". On 1 January 1996, Bloodloss issued their next album, Misty. McFarlane found it showed "echoes of Pere Ubu, Thug and all manner of jazz and blues".

=== Mudhoney (since 2001) ===
In 2001, after the departure of founding bass guitarist Matt Lukin, Maddison joined the band Mudhoney, reuniting with Arm. He has appeared on all of their studio albums since then, most recently in Plastic Eternity. In November 2011, Arm credited Maddison with reinvigorating his interest in the group after Lukin had left.

== Personal life ==
Guy Bernard Maddison was born on 31 March 1965 and grew up in Perth, Western Australia. In addition to his work as a musician, Maddison also works as a critical care nurse at Harborview Medical Center.

== Discography ==
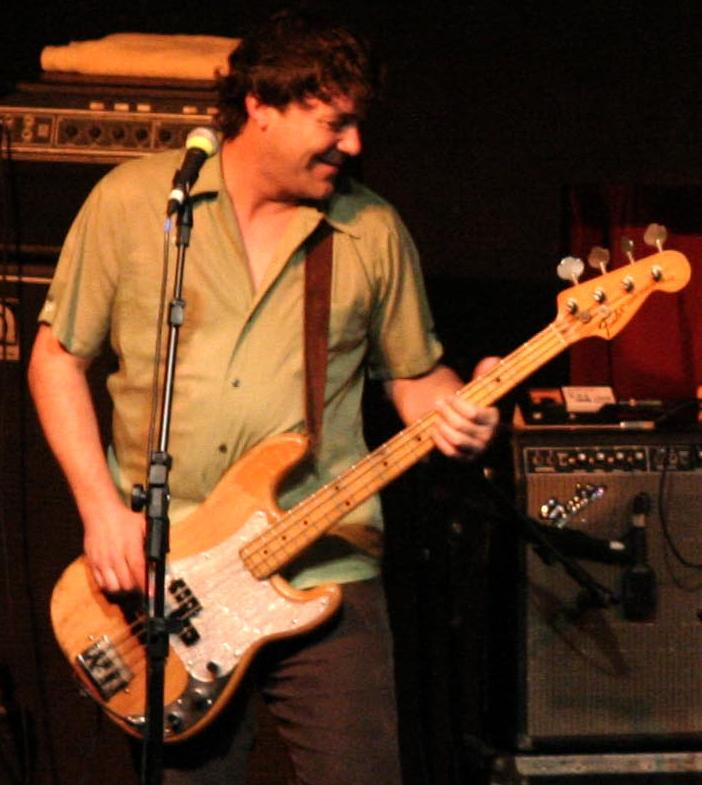
Maddison in 2007

With Lubricated Goat

- Paddock of Love (1988) Black Eye Records
- Schadenfreude EP (1989) Black Eye Records

With Bushpig

- Bushpig (1990) Practical Goat Keeping Records, PGK 001

With Monroe's Fur

- New World Order Catalogue (1991) Vinal Pollution Records
- Fire/Green Horn (1994) Carving Knife Records, CKR-011

With Bloodloss

- Live My Way, (1995)
- Misty, (1996)
- In a Gadda-da-Change (1993)

With Mudhoney

- Since We've Become Translucent (2002)
- Under a Billion Suns, (2006)
- Live in Mexico City (2007)
- The Lucky Ones (2008)
- Vanishing Point (2013)
- Digital Garbage (2018)
- Plastic Eternity (2023)
