= Bloodloss =

Former Australian Grunge Band

- Also known as: Zulu Rattle
- Origin: Sydney, New South Wales, Australia
- Genres: Post-punk; grunge; jazz; blues
- Years active: 1982–1984; 1986–1997
- Labels: Greasy Pop; Aberrant; Sympathy for the Record Industry; Warner/Reprise; Au-go-go; Memorandum
- Past members: see Members

Bloodloss was an Australian post-punk, grunge band formed in 1982. The original line-up was Martin Bland on drums, Renestair E.J. on guitar and saxophone, Jim Selene on bass guitar, and Sharron Weatherill on lead vocals and guitar. They issued five albums: Human Skin Suit (June 1988), The Truth Is Marching In (1990), In-a-Gadda-Da-Change (1993), Live My Way (March 1996) and Misty (1996).

== History ==
Bloodloss was formed in Sydney late in 1982 as a post-punk, grunge band by Martin Bland on drums (ex-Chaos, Head On, Crawling Eye, Acid Drops), Renestair E.J. (née Eric Reynolds) on guitar and saxophone (ex-Head On), Jim Selene on bass guitar (ex-Spell) and Sharron Weatherill on lead vocals and guitar. Bland and Renestair E.J.'s earlier Adelaide-based group, Head On, are described by Australian musicologist, Ian McFarlane, as "a loud, Detroit-fuelled punk band in the vein of The Stooges and MC5." Renestair E.J. had relocated to Sydney while Bland remained in Adelaide to briefly join Crawling Eye and then Acid Drops before also moving to Sydney.

Bloodloss had a run of temporary drummers prior to Bland joining. AllMusic's Ned Raggett described the group's sound as "loud blues/Vegas/punk craziness." Late in 1983, when Stuart Gray (a.k.a. Stu Spasm) joined on guitar and vocals, the group changed their name to Zulu Rattle. They issued a sole track, "Terror Train", on a various artists' compilation album, Strawberry Hills (1984), via Green Records. In March 1984 Bland and Gray left to form Salamander Jim alongside Tex Perkins and Zulu Rattle disbanded.

Bland returned to Adelaide in 1985 where he rejoined Selene, who was a member of Primevils with Dave Mason on guitar and vocals (ex-Head On, Acid Drops) and Su Severin on guitar (ex-Crawling Eye). That line-up issued a single, "I Saw My Name" (November 1986), which was co-written by Bland, Mason, Severin and J Syrokos. Bland and Gray formed a noise rock group, Lubricated Goat, in 1986 in Sydney. Renestair E.J. joined Primevils prior to recording their debut and sole album, Chicken Factory, which was released via Greasy Pop Records in May 1987.

Back in 1986 Renestair E.J. and Weatherhill reformed Bloodloss in Adelaide by recruiting Charlie Tolnay on lead guitar (ex-Grong Grong, also in King Snake Roost), Andrew Stosch (a.k.a. Andrew Foley) on drums and Chris Wiley on bass guitar (from Fear and Loathing). They issued a music cassette, Bloodloss, in that year.

Bland rejoined Bloodloss in 1987 as second drummer with Stosch. They issued an album, Human Skin Suit, in June 1988, which McFarlane opined was "a jazzy brand of pre-grunge noise." Afterwards Tolnay focussed solely on his work with King Snake Roost, Weatherhill left and Bland shifted over to lead vocals and guitar.

The new line-up released a single, "Smell Machine", in March 1989 before Wiley left and Selene returned on bass guitar. In 1990 they issued their next album, The Truth Is Marching In, before disbanding in the next year. Bland and Renestair E.J. returned to Lubricated Goat in 1990 in Sydney. Then they relocated to Seattle where they resumed Bloodloss in 1993 with Mark Arm on guitar and vocals and fellow Australian expatriate, Guy Maddison, on bass guitar and vocals (ex-Lubricated Goat, Monroe's Fur, Greenhouse Effect). Arm was a member of Seattle-based grunge band, Mudhoney.

Bloodloss released an album, Live My Way, in March 1996, on Warner/Reprise which McFarlane observed provided "delta blues by way of Captain Beefheart and Jon Spencer Blues Explosion." Raggett rated the album at four out of five stars and found the group "dedicated to amped-up, brutally trashy fun... [Arm] steps back from the spotlight except on the hilarious 'The Truth Is Marching In'; otherwise, it's Renestair and Bland's show first and foremost, and they put on a good one."

They followed with Misty later that year on Au-go-go Records, it "contained material from 1993–1994 which displayed echoes of Pere Ubu, Thug and all manner of jazz and blues." The group disbanded in 1997. Maddison joined Arm in Mudhoney.

== Members ==
- Jeremy Bender – drums (1982)
- Duncan Coleman – drums (1982)
- John Gazzola – drums (1982)
- Yvette Ralph – drums (1982)
- Renestair E.J. (née Eric Reynolds) – guitar, saxophone (1982–84, 1986–91, 1993–97)
- Jim Selene – bass guitar (1982–84, 1988–91)
- Sharron Weatherill – lead vocals (1982–84, 1986–88),
- Martin Bland – drums (1982–84, 1987–88, 1993–97), guitar, vocals (1988–91)
- Andre Poublon – drums (1983)
- Stuart Gray (a.k.a. Stu Spasm) – guitar vocals (1983–84)
- Andrew Foley (a.k.a. Andrew Stosch) – drums (1986–89)
- Chris Wiley – bass guitar (1986-1988)
- David Creese – drums (1991)
- Rick Bishop – bass guitar (1992)
- Mark Arm – guitar, vocals (1993–97)
- Guy Maddison – bass guitar, vocals (1993–97)

== Discography ==
=== Albums ===
- Bloodloss (1986) – Greasy Pop Records
- Human Skin Suit (June 1988) – Greasy Pop Records
- The Truth Is Marching In (1990) – Aberrant Records
- In-a-Gadda-Da-Change (1993) – Sympathy for the Record Industry
- Ten Solid Rockin' Inches of Rock Solid Rock 10" (1994) – Sympathy for the Record Industry
- Live My Way (March 1996) – Warner/Reprise
- Misty (1996) – Au-go-go Records
- The Truth Is Marching In 1983–1991 (2× CD compilation, 2010) – Memorandum Recordings
