= Every Good Boy Deserves Fudge =

Studio album by Mudhoney
- Released: July 26, 1991
- Recorded: Spring 1991
- Studio: Egg
- Genre: Grunge; garage punk
- Length: 42:29
- Label: Sub Pop
- Producer: Conrad Uno

Mudhoney chronology
Mudhoney (1989)	Every Good Boy Deserves Fudge (1991)	Piece of Cake (1992)

Singles from Every Good Boy Deserves Fudge
- 1. "Let It Slide" Released: June 1991

Professional ratings
Review scores
Source	Rating
AllMusic	4.5/5 stars
Collector's Guide to Heavy Metal	8/10
The Encyclopedia of Popular Music	3/5 stars
Entertainment Weekly	B−
MusicHound Rock	3.5/5 stars
NME	8/10
Ox-Fanzine	5/5 stars
PopMatters	8/10
The Rolling Stone Album Guide	3/5 stars
Spin Alternative Record Guide	6/10

Every Good Boy Deserves Fudge is the second studio album by American rock band Mudhoney. It was recorded at a time when the band was thinking of signing to a major record label, but decided to release the album on Sub Pop in 1991. The album shipped 50,000 copies on its original release. It was credited with helping to keep Sub Pop in business.

Guitarist Steve Turner has said that the album is his "favorite Mudhoney album as a whole."

There is an alternate version of "Check-Out Time" on the Let It Slide EP.

Two singles were lifted from the album: Let It Slide was issued as an EP in Europe and the United States, featuring bonus tracks and songs that did not make the album, while Into The Drink was released as a promotional effort.

== Recording and production ==
The album was recorded on cheap tape via an 8-track desk. It is named after a mnemonic used by music students to recall the notes (EGBDF) on the lines of the treble clef.

== Critical reception and legacy ==
Entertainment Weekly wrote: "Imagine the heaviest of Black Sabbath heavy metal, only somewhat speeded up and with added touches of humor, and you have a good approximation of the Mudhoney way of life." Trouser Press wrote that "Conrad Uno’s dry 8-track production sharpens Mudhoney’s garage-rock edge — evident in Arm’s fuzzed-out vocals and a shared fondness for second-hand blues progressions — enough to stand apart from the watered-down metal of most flannel merchants, but they don’t go anywhere with it." The Spin Alternative Record Guide called the album "charming," writing that a "revitalized sense of hooks connect Mudhoney more directly back to '60s garage." Mark Deming of AllMusic wrote: "Every Good Boy Deserves Fudge was Mudhoney's declaration that they didn't need grunge to survive, and if their timing proved to be a bit off, their musical instincts were faultless, and it's one of their very best albums."

Along with the band's debut EP Superfuzz Bigmuff, the album was included in 1001 Albums You Must Hear Before You Die, with reviewer Jason Chow calling it "a classic album, one of the best of the genre."

In 2022, Stuart Berman and Jeremy D. Larson of Pitchfork included the album in their list of "The 25 Best Grunge Albums of the '90s".

== Track listing ==
All tracks are written by Mudhoney.

No.	Title	Length
1.	"Generation Genocide"	1:13
2.	"Let It Slide"	2:35
3.	"Good Enough"	3:25
4.	"Something So Clear"	4:14
5.	"Thorn"	2:10
6.	"Into the Drink"	2:08
7.	"Broken Hands"	6:02
8.	"Who You Drivin' Now?"	2:21
9.	"Move Out"	3:32
10.	"Shoot the Moon"	2:27
11.	"Fuzzgun '91"	1:52
12.	"Pokin' Around"	3:30
13.	"Don't Fade IV"	3:58
14.	"Check-Out Time"	3:07

2021 30th anniversary deluxe edition bonus tracks
No.	Title	Origin	Length
1.	"March to Fuzz"	The Estrus Half-Rack, 1991 (*)	2:20
2.	"Ounce of Deception"	"Let It Slide" single, 1991	1:50
3.	"Paperback Life" (alternate version)	"Let It Slide" single	1:35
4.	"Fuzzbuster"	Nardwuar the Human Serviette Presents... Clam Chowder and Ice Vs Big Macs and Bombers, 1991 (*)	1:56
5.	"Bushpusher Man"	Puget Power III, 1992 (*)	2:25
6.	"Flowers for Industry"	Previously unreleased	3:21
7.	"Thorn" (1st attempt)	"You're Gone" single, 1990	1:49
8.	"Overblown"	Singles: Original Motion Picture Soundtrack, 1992 (*)	2:59
9.	"March from Fuzz"	March to Fuzz, 2000	2:22
10.	"You're Gone"	Non-album single, 1990	4:05
11.	"Something So Clear" (24-track demo)	Previously unreleased	4:29
12.	"Bushpusher Man" (24-track demo)	Previously unreleased	2:27
13.	"Pokin' Around" (24-track demo)	Previously unreleased	4:00
14.	"Check-Out Time" (24-track demo)	Previously unreleased	3:21
15.	"Generation Genocide" (24-track demo)	Previously unreleased	2:44

- Releases marked with an asterik (*) are various artists compilation albums.

== Personnel ==
Adapted from the album liner notes.

Mudhoney

- Mark Arm – vocals, guitar, organ
- Steve Turner – guitar, harmonica, backing vocals
- Matt Lukin – bass guitar, backing vocals
- Dan Peters – drums, backing vocals

Technical

- Conrad Uno – producer, engineer
- Ed Fotheringham – cover art

== Charts ==
Chart (1991)	Peak position
Official UK Charts	34
