= Mudhoney (album) =

Studio album by Mudhoney
- Released: November 1, 1989
- Recorded: July 1989
- Studio: Reciprocal, Seattle, Washington
- Genre: Grunge; garage punk
- Length: 37:32
- Label: Sub Pop (US) Glitterhouse (Europe)
- Producer: Jack Endino, Mudhoney (Note: Although no producer is credited on the album, the 2000 March to Fuzz compilation credits Jack Endino and Mudhoney as producers.)

Mudhoney chronology
Boiled Beef & Rotting Teeth (1989)	Mudhoney (1989)	Every Good Boy Deserves Fudge (1991)

Singles from Mudhoney
- 1. "This Gift" Released: 1989

Mudhoney is the debut studio album by American rock band Mudhoney, released in 1989. It was their first LP after several singles and two EPs (Superfuzz Bigmuff and Boiled Beef & Rotting Teeth).

The instrumental song "Magnolia Caboose Babyshit" is a cover of "Magnolia Caboose Babyfinger" by Blue Cheer, but the song is still credited to Mudhoney. The album, when bought as a new vinyl record, is also packaged with a poster of the band (Photo by Michael Lavine). The poster features the band in a blue filter and says "Mudhoney. The album is out." as well as the SubPop and Au Go Go logos.

== Critical reception ==
Professional ratings
Review scores
Source	Rating
AllMusic	3/5 stars
The Encyclopedia of Popular Music	2/5 stars
The Great Rock Discography	6/10
Metal Hammer	4/5 stars
MusicHound Rock	4/5 stars
NME	8/10
The Rolling Stone Album Guide	2.5/5 stars
Spin Alternative Record Guide	6/10

In 2009, BBC Music noted that "the manic, macabre garage-rock contortions of their debut album remain a scuzzed-up, sleazy and subterranean treasure."

== Track listing ==
All tracks are written by Mudhoney, except where noted.

1. "This Gift" – 3:34
2. "Flat Out Fucked" – 2:15
3. "Get Into Yours" – 3:50
4. "You Got It" – 2:50
5. "Magnolia Caboose Babyshit" – 1:07
6. "Come to Mind" – 4:52
7. "Here Comes Sickness" – 3:41
8. "Running Loaded" – 2:50
9. "The Farther I Go" – 2:07
10. "By Her Own Hand" – 3:16
11. "When Tomorrow Hits" – 2:39
12. "Dead Love" – 4:27

2009 Japanese CD reissue bonus tracks

13. "Revolution" (Pete Kember) – 4:47
14. "Baby Help Me Forget" (Mr. Epp) – 2:30
- Tracks 13 and 14 are B-sides from the "This Gift" single.

== Personnel ==
Taken from the album liner notes.

- Mark Arm - vocals, guitar
- Steve Turner - guitar, vocals
- Matt Lukin - bass guitar, vocals
- Dan Peters - drums, vocals

=== Production personnel ===
- Jack Endino - engineering
- Jane Higgins - album cover design
- Michael Lavine - album cover photography

== Charts ==
Chart (1989)	Peak position
UK Indie Chart	1
