= The Dicks Hate the Police =

"The Dicks Hate The Police"

Single by the Dicks
- Released: 1980
- Genre: Hardcore punk
- Label: Radical
- Songwriters: Gary Floyd, Glen Taylor, Buxf Parrott, Pat Deason

The Dicks singles chronology
"Hate The Police 7" (1980)	"Live at Raul's Club" (1980)

"The Dicks Hate the Police" (usually shortened to "Hate the Police") is the debut release and 7-inch single from the American hardcore punk band the Dicks, released in 1980. The record was released on the band's own Radical Records imprint. Mudhoney included a cover of the song on Superfuzz Bigmuff Plus Early Singles.

== Critical reception ==
Pitchfork wrote that "the song contained few words and fewer chords, and yet, with an arch sneer, the singer—Gary Floyd, a genuine punk hero deserving of recognition beyond the underground—communicated the essence of state power deployed in its most wretched everyday form." The A.V. Club called it a "classic," writing that "even removed from its historical and geographical contexts 'Hate The Police' remains a powerful song." The Dallas Observer called it "perhaps the finest single ever released by a Texas punk band."

== Track listing ==
1. The Dicks Hate the Police
2. Lifetime Problems
3. All Night Fever

== Line up ==
- Gary Floyd – Vocals
- Glen Taylor – Guitar
- Buxf Parrot – Bass, vocals on "All Night Fever"
- Pat Deason – Drums
