= Dan Peters =

American drummer (born 1967)

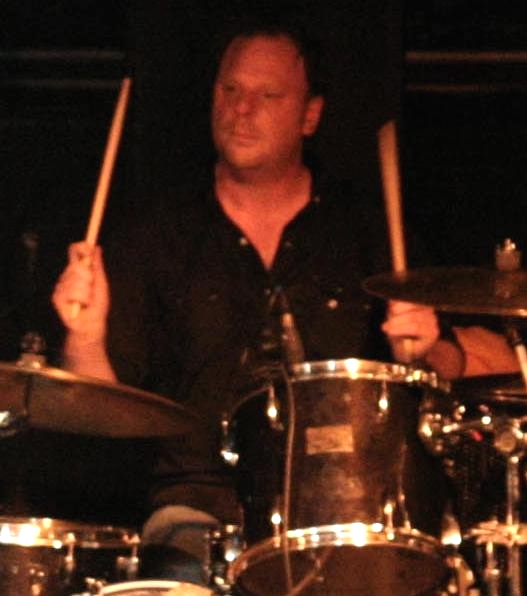
- Peters performing in 2007

Background information
- Born: Daniel Joe Peters; August 18, 1967 (age 59); Seattle, Washington, U.S.
- Genres: Punk rock, alternative rock, grunge
- Occupation: Musician
- Instruments: Drums, vocals
- Labels: Sub Pop, Reprise Records
- Member of: Mudhoney
- Formerly of: Bundle of Hiss; Feast; Nirvana; Screaming Trees; Fastbacks; Love Battery; VALIS

Daniel Joe Peters (born August 18, 1967) is an American drummer best known for being a member of Mudhoney, having played with them since their formation in 1988. Prior to Mudhoney, he joined Bundle of Hiss when he was fifteen years old.

He was also briefly the drummer for Nirvana in the summer of 1990, playing on one single, "Sliver", and making one live appearance with them that September in Seattle, shortly before drummer Dave Grohl joined. Peters has expressed his only regret as missing the chance to play drums on Nirvana's album Nevermind. Mudhoney's latest offering is Plastic Eternity released on April 7, 2023. Peters also played drums for the Ellensburg, Washington based band Screaming Trees from 1990 to 1991, and appeared in the movie Black Sheep alongside David Spade and Chris Farley.

== Discography ==
=== With Mudhoney ===
- Superfuzz Bigmuff (1988)
- Mudhoney (1989)
- Every Good Boy Deserves Fudge (1991)
- Piece of Cake (1992)
- Five Dollar Bob's Mock Cooter Stew (1993)
- My Brother the Cow (1995)
- Tomorrow Hit Today (1998)
- Since We've Become Translucent (2002)
- Under a Billion Suns (2006)
- The Lucky Ones (2008)
- Vanishing Point (2013)
- Digital Garbage (2018)
- Plastic Eternity (2023)

=== With Bundle of Hiss ===
- Sessions: 1986-1988 (2000)

=== With Nirvana ===
- Sliver (1990) - single
- Incesticide (1992) ("Sliver" only. Appears as drummer.)
- Nirvana (2002) ("Sliver" only. Appears as drummer.)

=== With Love Battery ===
- Confusion Au Go Go (1999)

Preceded by Dale Crover	Drummer of Nirvana; 1990	Succeeded by Dave Grohl
