= Johnny Sangster =

Musician and producer from America

Johnny Sangster is an American musician, record producer, and recording engineer.

== Professional career ==
Johnny Sangster is a Seattle-based recording engineer, musician, and producer. As a musician he is known for The Sharing Patrol, Dear John Letters, The Tripwires, Mark Pickerel & His Praying Hands, as well as being a touring guitar player and keyboardist for Neko Case. Sangster’s producer and engineer credits include The Briefs, Mudhoney, The Posies, Supersuckers, and many others. He currently works primarily out of Crackle & Pop, a studio that he cofounded and operates along with Andrew Smith in Seattle’s Ballard neighborhood.

=== The Sharing Patrol ===
The Sharing Patrol began on Lopez Island while Johnny Sangster and drummer Jonathan Stibbard were in high school. Following high school Sangster relocated to Copenhagen, Denmark, followed shortly after by Stibbard, where The Sharing Patrol met bassist Henrik Tuxen. The Sharing Patrol released several albums on independent record labels in Scandinavia before moving to the major label EMI. For their final album, Take You There, in 1996, The Sharing Patrol decided to return to their hometown of Seattle to record with producer Kurt Bloch of The Fastbacks and Young Fresh Fellows.

=== Return to Seattle and production ===
Following the experience of recording Take You There, Sangster moved back to Seattle, Washington, in 1997. In Seattle he decided to focus on the production and engineering side of the music industry. Upon returning to Seattle he began engineering records at Egg Studio with Conrad Uno. From there he began to produce more sessions, finding his experience and skill as a musician a boon to communicating with bands.

Sangster later worked out of other Seattle studios such as Avast, Soundhouse, and Electrokitty. In 2006 he opened Crackle & Pop studio in the Ballard neighborhood of Seattle. Crackle & Pop was originally envisioned as a smaller space to record overdubs and mix records, but due to demand Crackle & Pop quickly grew past its original vision. In 2018 Crackle & Pop expanded into a larger space in order to accommodate full bands and larger groups.

The expansion of Crackle & Pop was possible due to inheriting equipment from the recently closed Egg Studio including a Spectra Sonics recording console that originally belonged to the Stax Records studios as well as several vintage tape machines. The new expanded Crackle & Pop features a full wall mural by Austin, Texas artist and musician Tim Kerr. Crackle & Pop also continues to produce their “Live at Crackle & Pop,” a series of intimate live videos with artists such as Ken Stringfellow, Rusty Willoughby, and Bronwynne Brent, as well as many other local Seattle artists.

=== 2016-present ===
In addition to producing records and expanding Crackle & Pop, Sangster was also a member of the Case/Lang/Veirs touring band during their 2016/2017 world tour. Following that tour, he has continued as a member of Neko Case’s touring band in support of her album Hell-On in 2018/19. He regularly performs with The Tripwires and several other bands in Seattle. Sangster released his first full solo album entitled The Moon on the Ceiling & Other Night Hags in 2018.
