= Mudhoney =

American rock band

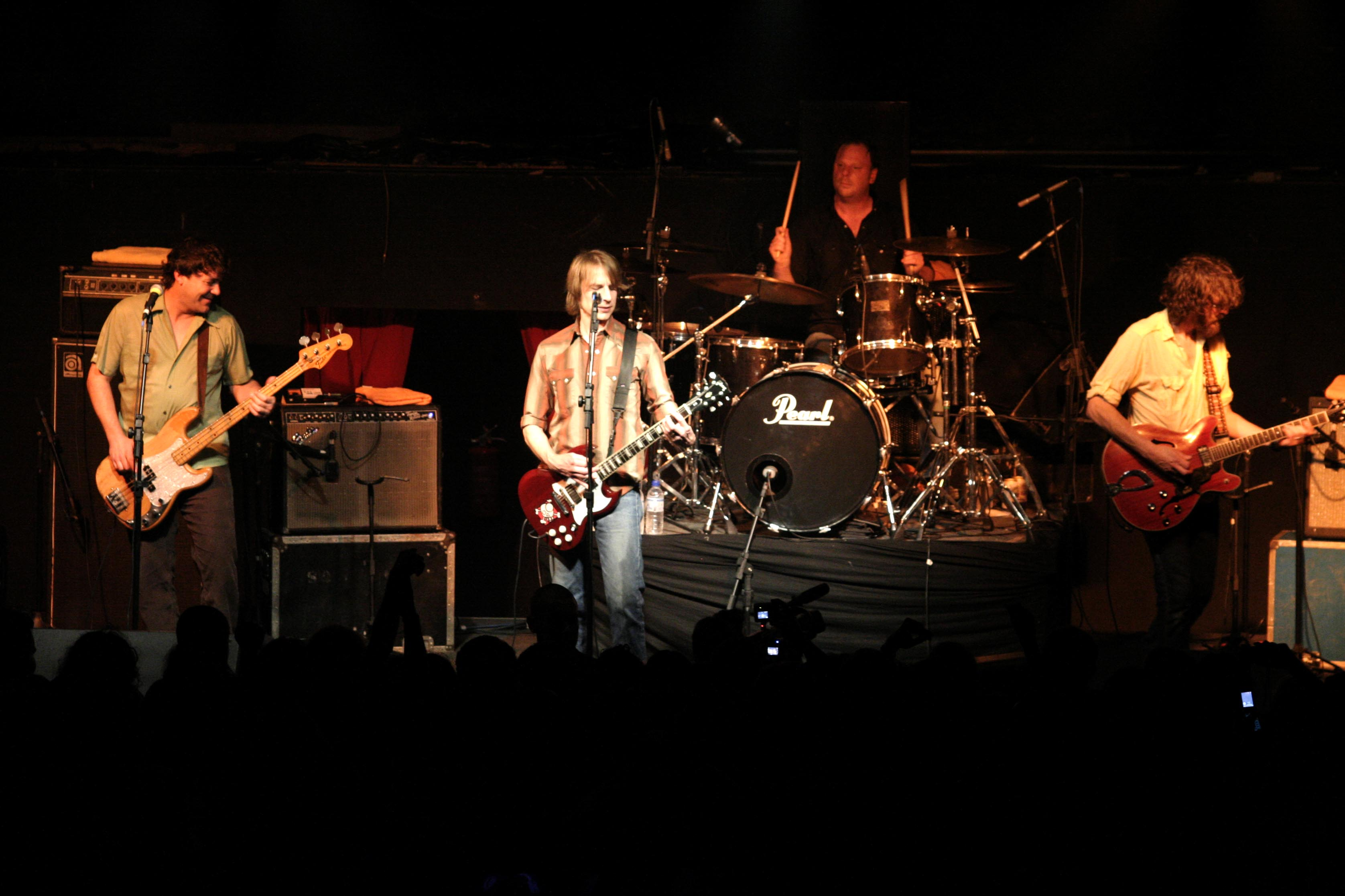
- Mudhoney in 2007. From left to right: Guy Maddison, Mark Arm, Dan Peters and Steve Turner

Background information
- Origin: Seattle, Washington, U.S.
- Genres: Alternative rock; grunge; garage punk; punk rock
- Works: Discography
- Years active: 1988–present
- Labels: Sub Pop; Reprise
- Spinoff of: Green River
- Members: Mark Arm; Steve Turner; Dan Peters; Guy Maddison
- Past members: Matt Lukin

Mudhoney is an American rock band formed in Seattle, Washington, on January 1, 1988, following the demise of Green River. Its members are singer and rhythm guitarist Mark Arm, lead guitarist Steve Turner, bassist Guy Maddison and drummer Dan Peters. Original bassist Matt Lukin left the band in 1999, but rejoined the band in December 2000 for a tour that lasted through January 2001.

Mudhoney's early releases on the Sub Pop label, particularly their debut single "Touch Me I'm Sick" and the Superfuzz Bigmuff EP, were instrumental in the creation of the grunge genre. Although the band found little commercial success and remained somewhat 'underground' and non-mainstream, Mudhoney has released eleven studio albums and inspired countless grunge and alternative rock musicians during their long career.

== History ==
=== Mr. Epp and the Calculations: 1978–1984 ===
Mark Arm and Steve Turner met through their association with Mr. Epp and the Calculations. This band formed in 1978 in Bellevue, Washington, a suburb of Seattle. While at Bellevue Christian High School, Mark McLaughlin (later known as Mark Arm) and some friends started Mr. Epp and the Calculations, a band named after a math teacher of his. Initially the band was essentially a joke band rather than a serious one; their first "show" was in class singing Marvin Gaye's "Got to Give It Up", using rolled-up maps as guitars because they could not actually play any instruments. Mr. Epp and the Calculations played their first real show in 1981, three years after they formed. To make the band seem more serious, Mr. Epp added a second guitarist, Steve Turner, who was in a small garage band called The Ducky Boys. Arm and Turner became instant friends. In 1983, three songs of Mr. Epp were included in First Strike: a compilation, the first cassette in the BCT catalog. Mr. Epp and the Calculations appeared on KZAM radio and were introduced as "the worst band in the world." They played their last show on February 3, 1984, with Malfunkshun at Seattle's Metropolis. Arm and Turner formed a joke-punk band called The Limp Richerds in 1984 near the end of Mr. Epp but this band ended shortly after Mr. Epp's ending as well.

=== Green River: 1984–1987 ===
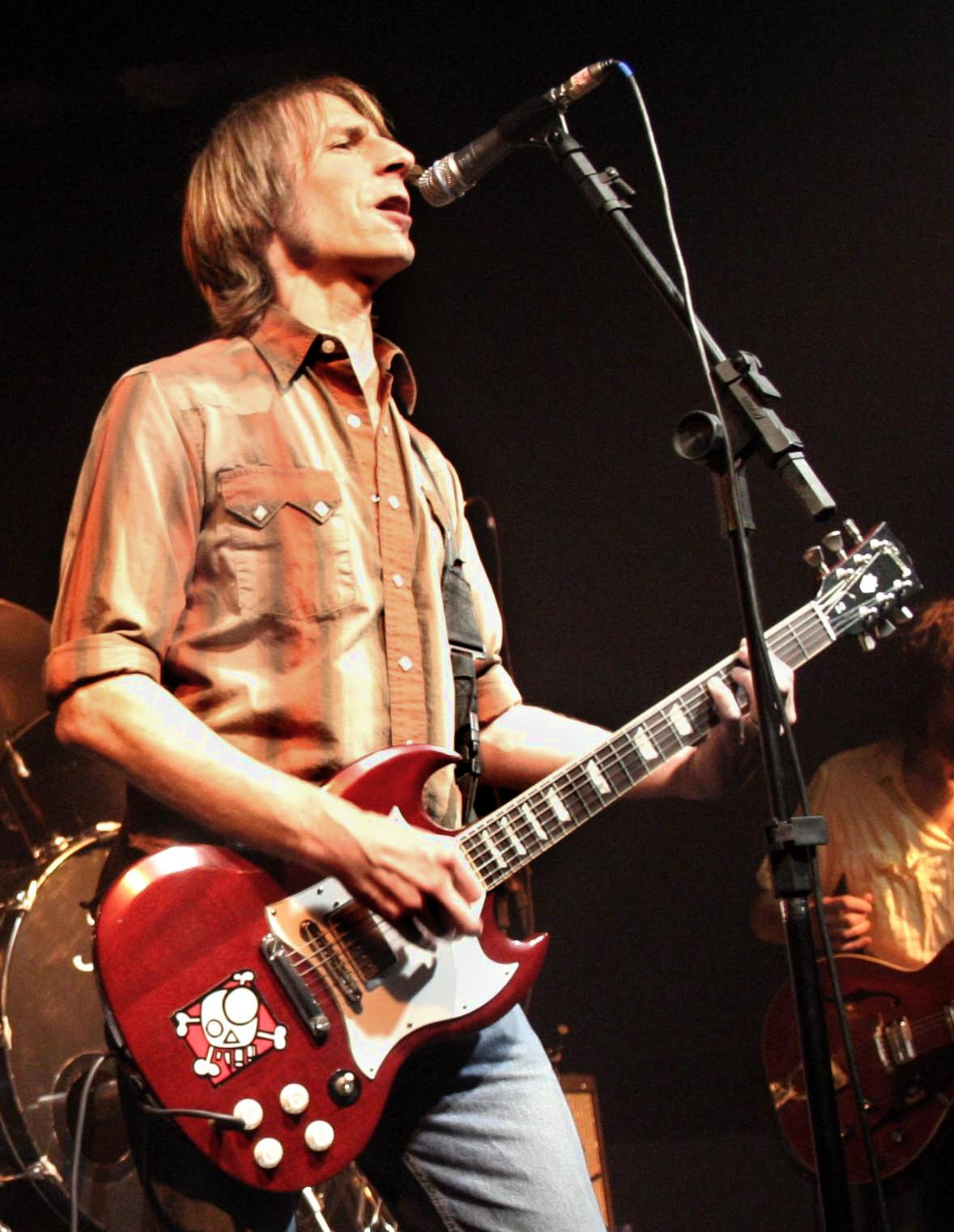
Frontman Mark Arm

Green River was formed in 1984 when Arm and Turner recruited Alex Vincent as drummer, who had previously played with Turner in the short-lived Spluii Numa. Bassist Jeff Ament joined the band after arriving in Seattle with his band Deranged Diction. Stone Gossard, another of Turner's former bandmates, was recruited as second guitarist. Green River recorded their debut EP, Come on Down, in 1985, and it is considered the first grunge record because it was released several months before the Deep Six album (which featured music by Green River and five other Seattle grunge bands). Turner left the band after its release due to his distaste of the band's hard rock leanings. He was replaced by another Deranged Diction member, Bruce Fairweather. After recording another EP (Dry As a Bone) and a full-length album (Rehab Doll), the band disbanded in late 1987. Gossard, Ament, and Fairweather went on to join Mother Love Bone. Following lead singer Andrew Wood's death, Gossard and Ament went on to form Pearl Jam, and Fairweather joined Love Battery.

=== Sub Pop: 1988–1991 ===
Turner wanted to start a band that practiced before playing to a live audience. He and Arm began songwriting with Bundle of Hiss drummer Dan Peters. The trio decided that Matt Lukin, who had recently left Melvins, should join the band as bassist. The band's first practice with its full original lineup was on January 1, 1988 and their first show took place later that year, on April 19. The band named themselves after the Russ Meyer film Mudhoney.

In early 1988, Arm played Sub Pop founder Bruce Pavitt a poor boombox recording Mudhoney had made. Pavitt suggested the band record with producer Jack Endino and offered to release it on Sub Pop. This recording session resulted in Mudhoney's first single, "Touch Me I'm Sick". The band recorded and released their debut EP, Superfuzz Bigmuff, also on Sub Pop. Mudhoney quickly became Sub Pop's flagship band.

Sonic Youth, who were fans of Mudhoney, took the band out on a tour of the West Coast and the Southwest, followed by a two-week jaunt through the United Kingdom. According to Arm, their association with Sonic Youth endeared British audiences to them: "The U.K. was crazy, and Sonic Youth, at that point, were like total walking gods. The previous tour, they had Dinosaur Jr. with them, which made that band in the U.K. They could bring someone over and basically anoint them." After this tour Superfuzz Bigmuff entered the British indie charts and the band received a respectable amount of press coverage.

"Touch Me I'm Sick"
Sample of "Touch Me I'm Sick", a single by Mudhoney. The sample illustrates the song's high tempo, main guitar riff, heavy use of distortion and frenetic drumming. Also heard are band frontman Mark Arm's self-deprecating and sarcastic lyrics.

Upon returning from Europe, Mudhoney played the Sub Pop-organized Lamefest alongside Nirvana and Tad on June 6, 1989. The festival, held at Seattle's Moore Theatre, sold out, and is seen by Bruce Pavitt as "the definitive turning point in the Seattle music scene." The band released their first album, Mudhoney that same year.

Kurt Cobain listed Superfuzz Bigmuff as one of his favourite albums in his journal in 1993.

They released their second album, Every Good Boy Deserves Fudge, in 1991. After the album's release they were offered a deal with Reprise Records, and they joined the label in 1992.

=== Reprise: 1992–1999 ===
Mudhoney's first album with Reprise was Piece of Cake. In a 2008 Mojo magazine article, Turner explained the album references "how easily things had come to them ... the songs were kinda half-baked ..." They also contributed a track "Overblown" at this time to the soundtrack to the film Singles.

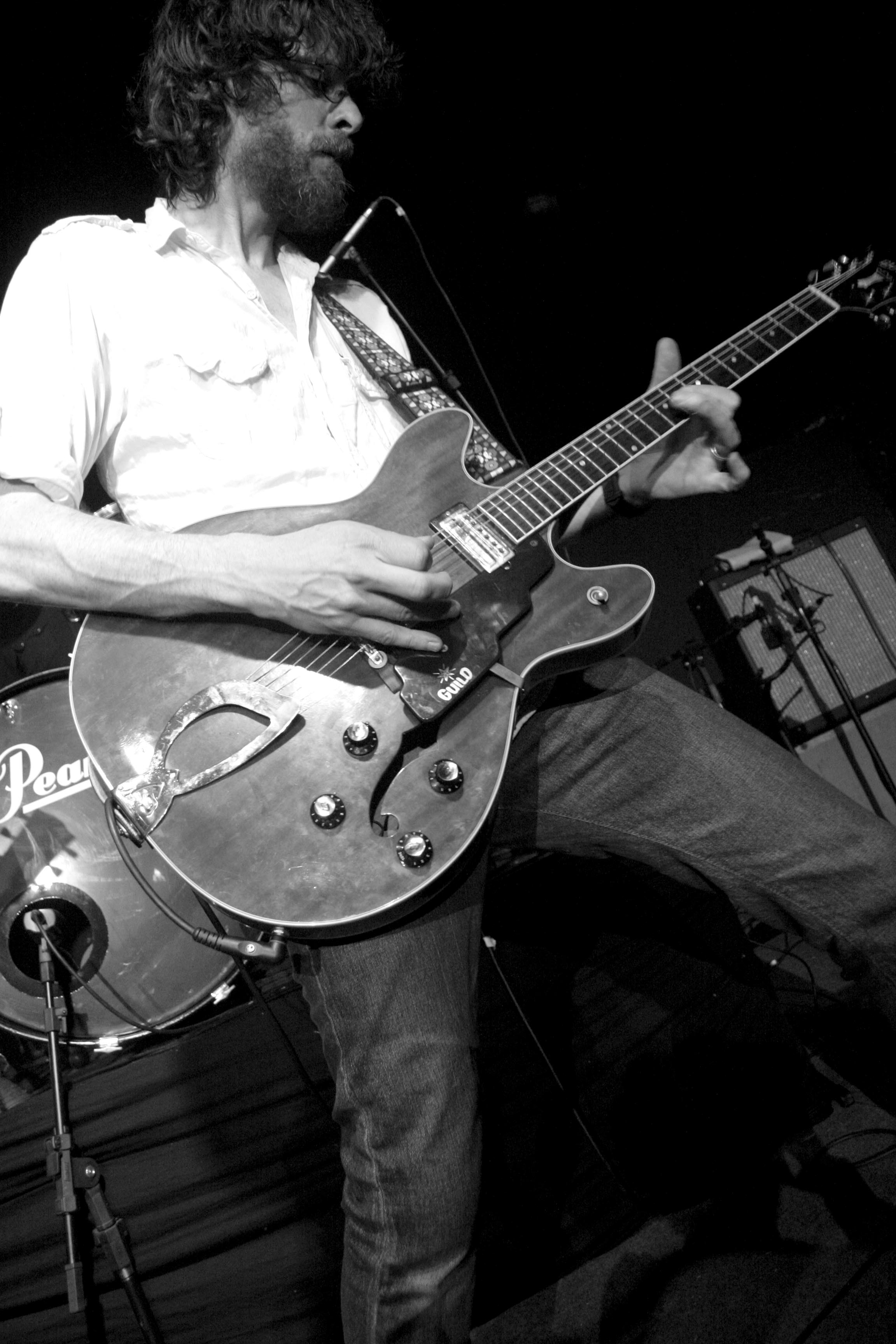
Lead guitarist Steve Turner in 2007

With their 1995 album My Brother the Cow they mixed their earlier and more recent sound, but Turner explained in an article in Mojo, "There was a backlash after Kurt [Cobain] killed himself. The English press were so angry that we were still around. Those were some of the worst reviews we'd ever gotten. We were mocked for still existing." The press was not all negative, as the album received praise in certain U.S. publications, including People magazine: "Leave the brooding anthems to Pearl Jam. Mudhoney delivers pure grunge—messy music that casts a powerful spell."

In 1996, Mudhoney appeared in the comedy movie Black Sheep, starring Chris Farley and David Spade. The band was shown performing at an MTV concert and then speaking with Farley backstage. Tomorrow Hit Today was released in September 1998. The album demonstrated a blues-rock influence, and the band used record producer Jim Dickinson, who worked with The Rolling Stones. They recorded the set in three different cities.

After a few years of touring, Reprise decided to cut ties with Mudhoney. Subsequently, Lukin left the band. They released March to Fuzz, a retrospective compilation album.

=== After Matt Lukin: 2000–present ===
Mudhoney continued to play some concerts in the Pacific Northwest and recruited permanent bassist Guy Maddison (of Monroe's Fur and Lubricated Goat) who had played with Arm in one of his many side projects, Bloodloss. In 2002, following their return to Sub Pop, the band recorded and released a new studio album, Since We've Become Translucent. This was followed by a major South American tour.

In early 2003 the band entered the studio to record "Hard-On For War", that would appear exclusively on Buddyhead Presents: Gimme Skelter compilation album. Later that year the band recorded Under a Billion Suns on which a new version of the song appeared. The album was released in 2006 and received favorable reviews. In 2006 the band also helped to curate an edition of the British All Tomorrow's Parties festival.

During 2007, Mudhoney played in Brazil again and went on a brief European tour. In November that year, the band released a live album entitled Live Mud, containing songs recorded at a concert in Mexico.

In 2008, Mudhoney began recording their next album with producer Tucker Martine, The Lucky Ones, which was released in May 2008. Shortly thereafter, Sub Pop released a deluxe, remastered edition of Superfuzz Bigmuff. The reissue contained the original EP in its correct running order, along with singles, demos, and two live recordings from 1988. In the liner notes of the reissued Superfuzz Bigmuff, Jay Hinman wrote:

My feeling—and I know I'm not alone in this one—is that for all the play and worldwide attention several Seattle-area bands got during the 1988–92 period, at the end of the day (and even at the time), there was Mudhoney—and then there was everybody else. To me, you, and everyone else paying close attention to underground rock music during those years, Mudhoney still sound like the undisputed kingpins of roaring, surging, fuzzed-out, punk music.

In 2009, Mudhoney announced a series of live dates. This included an extensive tour of Europe which started in Edinburgh, Scotland with Sub Pop labelmates The Vaselines. The tour ended on October 26. The group performed at the Nelsonville Music Festival in Nelsonville, Ohio, in May 2009. The group played at the ATP New York 2010 music festival in Monticello, New York in September 2010, where they performed Superfuzz Bigmuff in its entirety.

In 2011, Pearl Jam had Mudhoney open for them on their 20th Anniversary tour. They were chosen by Mogwai to perform in May 2012 at the All Tomorrow's Parties 'I'll Be Your Mirror' festival at Alexandra Palace, London. In April 2013 the band put out their ninth studio album Vanishing Point, followed by 2018's Digital Garbage.

In 2021, Mudhoney and Sub Pop celebrated the 30-year anniversary of Every Good Boy Deserves Fudge with a remastered deluxe version. This included remastered and re-released music videos and songs, as well as previously unreleased songs and demos.

Plastic Eternity was released by Sub Pop on April 6, 2023.

== Musical style and influences ==
Mark Deming of AllMusic called Mudhoney "a group with a penchant for metal muscle, punk attitude, and garage rock primitivism." He further described the band's discography as "big, loud, purposefully sloppy, a little bit menacing, and even more funny." Mudhoney have cited numerous bands and artists as influences, including the Stooges, Spacemen 3, Wipers, Dinosaur Jr., Neil Young, Black Flag, Feedtime, and the Scientists.

== Legacy ==
According to Mark Deming of AllMusic: "Nirvana may have been the band that put an entire generation in flannel, and Pearl Jam and Soundgarden both sold a lot more records, but Mudhoney were truly the band that made the '90s grunge rock movement possible. Mudhoney were the first real success story for Sub Pop Records; their music laid the groundwork for the movement that would (briefly) make Seattle, Washington the new capitol of the rock & roll universe. They took the sweat-soaked and beer-fueled mixture of heavy metal muscle, punk attitude, and garage rock primitivism that would become known as "grunge" to the hipster audience for the first time [...] and those fans would in turn sell it to a mass audience ready for something new. [...] Their importance on the Seattle scene cannot be underestimated, and their body of work [...] has stood the test of time better than their well-known colleagues."

== Members ==
=== Current members ===
- Mark Arm – lead vocals, rhythm guitar (1988–present)
- Dan Peters – drums, percussion, backing vocals (1988–present)
- Steve Turner – lead guitar, backing vocals (1988–present)
- Guy Maddison – bass guitar, backing vocals (2001–present)

=== Former members ===
- Matt Lukin – bass guitar, backing vocals (1988–2001)

== Discography ==
- Superfuzz Bigmuff (1988)
- Mudhoney (1989)
- Every Good Boy Deserves Fudge (1991)
- Piece of Cake (1992)
- My Brother the Cow (1995)
- Tomorrow Hit Today (1998)
- Since We've Become Translucent (2002)
- Under a Billion Suns (2006)
- The Lucky Ones (2008)
- Vanishing Point (2013)
- Digital Garbage (2018)
- Plastic Eternity (2023)

== Other sources ==
- Deming, Mark. "Mudhoney". AllMusic. Retrieved May 14, 2005.
- Vinylnet Record Label Discographies. link. – Sub Pop catalogue references.
