= Mark Arm =

American musician

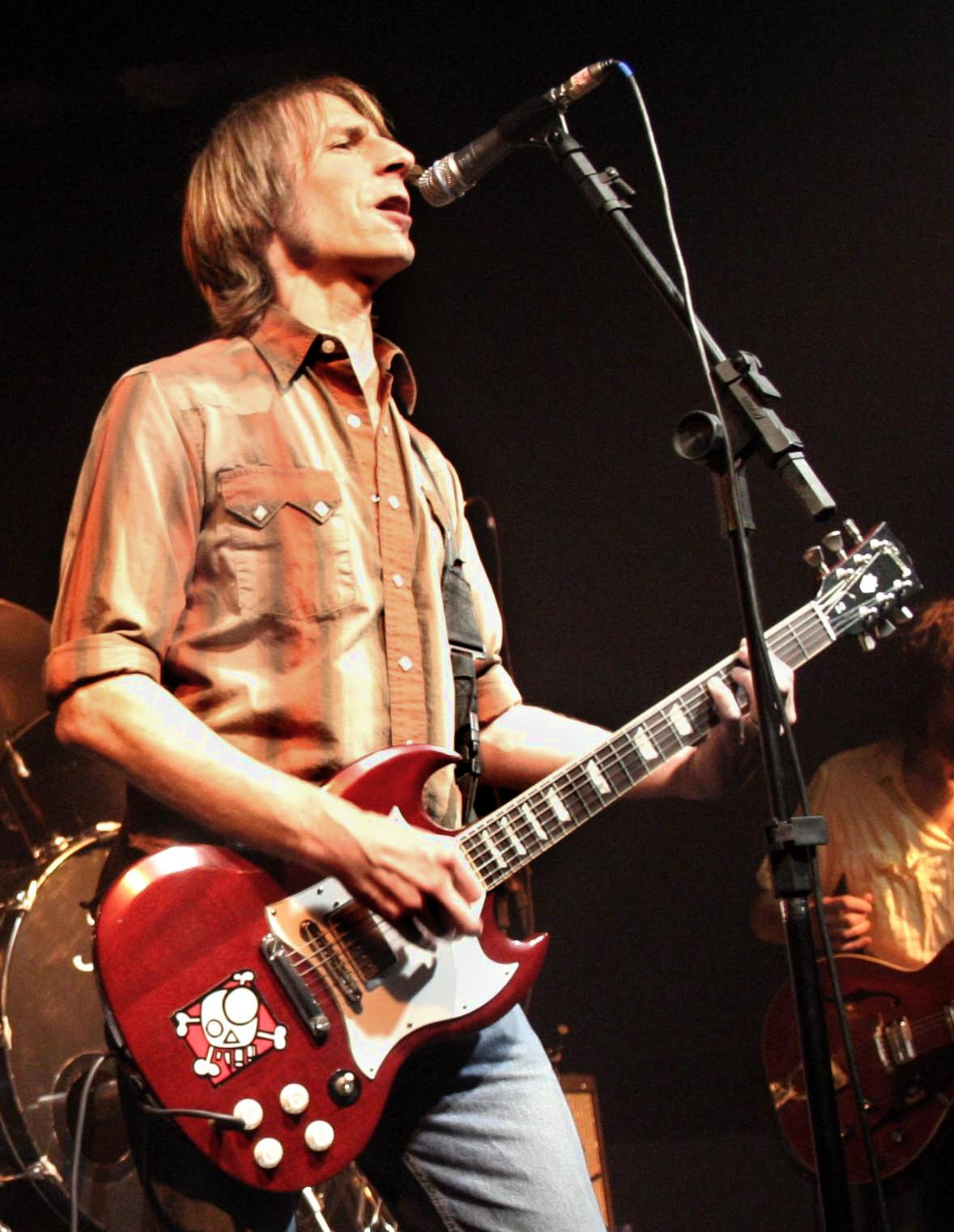
- Mark Arm in 2007

Background information
- Born: Mark Thomas McLaughlin; February 21, 1962 (age 64); Vandenberg Air Force Base, California, U.S.
- Genres: Grunge; alternative rock; garage punk; hardcore punk; heavy metal
- Occupations: Musician, songwriter, Warehouse manager
- Instruments: Vocals, guitar
- Years active: 1980–present
- Labels: Sub Pop, Reprise, C/Z, Homestead, Tasque Force
- Member of: Mudhoney
- Formerly of: The Monkeywrench, Green River, DKT/MC5
- Spouse: Emily Rieman
- Website: mudhoney.org

Mark Arm (born Mark Thomas McLaughlin; February 21, 1962) is an American singer and songwriter, best known as the vocalist for the grunge band Mudhoney. His former group, Green River, was one of the first grunge bands, along with Malfunkshun, Soundgarden, Skin Yard, the U-Men, and others. He is also the manager of the Sub Pop warehouse and previously worked at Fantagraphics Books.

== Early life ==
Arm was born February 21, 1962, at Vandenberg Air Force Base in California, and was raised in Kirkland, Washington. As a child, he was a member of Boy Scouts of America. He graduated from Bellevue Christian High School in Bellevue, Washington.

In 1985, Arm earned an English degree with an emphasis in creative writing from the University of Washington.

== Early career ==
Arm first entered the Seattle rock scene in 1980, when he formed a band while still in high school called Mr. Epp and the Calculations, with Jo Smitty and Peter Wick. The band was named after their math teacher and soccer coach. The band played its first show in 1981, and in 1982 they released the 7-inch EP Mohawk Man. The following year they added guitarist Steve Turner, and released a cassette described on the lyric sheet as a "combination of art and hardcore." The cassette featured one side of live recordings and a flip-side of studio recordings and experimental sounds; a sonic amalgam described in a 1984 issue of Revenge Against Boredom as "45 or so minutes of Pillow Fights, Jokes, some songs, preachers' garbled talking. And you get to find out what you get if you give up your personality."

That band split in 1984. Arm and Turner then joined the Limp Richerds for a few weeks. Afterward, Arm and Turner took on future Pearl Jam members Jeff Ament and Stone Gossard, as well as Alex Vincent, to form the band Green River. Green River released two EPs and a full-length album before disbanding. Steve Turner left the band to finish college, and Arm was forced to find a new band again.

== Mudhoney ==
Arm and Turner took on drummer Dan Peters, and bassist Matt Lukin, formerly of Melvins. The new band renamed themselves Mudhoney. In 1988, Sub Pop released Mudhoney's first single, "Touch Me I'm Sick". After extensive touring and an EP album, Mudhoney released their self-titled full length debut in 1989. Their next album, Every Good Boy Deserves Fudge came out soon after, just before the explosion of grunge spearheaded by Nirvana's seminal Nevermind. At the time, Sub Pop, their record label, was "on the verge of bankruptcy, having trouble paying its flagship band, severely delaying the release of the album to July 1991." In 1992, they signed to a major record label, Reprise and released Piece of Cake. The album did not sell well, due to a combination of the band's uncompromising sound and an oversaturation of the genre; according to Stephen Turner, the album references "how easily things had come to them...the songs were kinda half-baked... and Mark wasn't at his best."

Although they never achieved the fame of some of their contemporaries, Arm and Mudhoney have made significant contributions to grunge music. Mudhoney is one of the few grunge bands that continue to release albums; in 2002 they released Since We've Become Translucent, Under a Billion Suns in 2005, The Lucky Ones followed in May 2008, Vanishing Point came in April 2013, Digital Garbage came out in September 2018 and, most recently, Plastic Eternity in 2023. All of these releases have been on the Sub Pop record label.

== Solo and side projects ==
Arm released "The Freewheelin' Mark Arm", a solo single in 1990. He was a singer and guitarist for the group Bloodloss and singer for the Seattle supergroup The Monkeywrench. Monkeywrench members include Arm, Turner, Tim Kerr (Lord Hi Fixers, Big Boys, Poison 13), Tom Price (U-Men, Gas Huffer) and Martin Bland (Bloodloss). He has also made guest appearances on several albums, most notably on Alice in Chains' 1992 EP Sap.

In 1998, he made an appearance on the motion picture soundtrack for the film Velvet Goldmine with Ron Asheton, Mike Watt, Thurston Moore, and Steve Shelley under the name Wylde Ratttz. In 1999, he recorded the vocals for the song "I Need Somebody", a cover of the song by The Stooges, featured on Nebula's first album, To the Center.

In 2000, Arm, Turner, Peters, Scott McCaughey, Tom Price and Bill Henderson recorded the album "The New Original Sonic Sound" under the band name The New Strychnines. they recorded a compilation of 16 songs by the legendary mid-1960's Seattle garage band The Sonics. The album was released by Book Records. In 2004, he toured with MC5, standing in for the late Rob Tyner on vocals. In 2013, he contributed vocals on a cover version of The Scientists' "Set It on Fire" for the Melvins' album Everybody Loves Sausages.
