= Steve Turner (guitarist) =

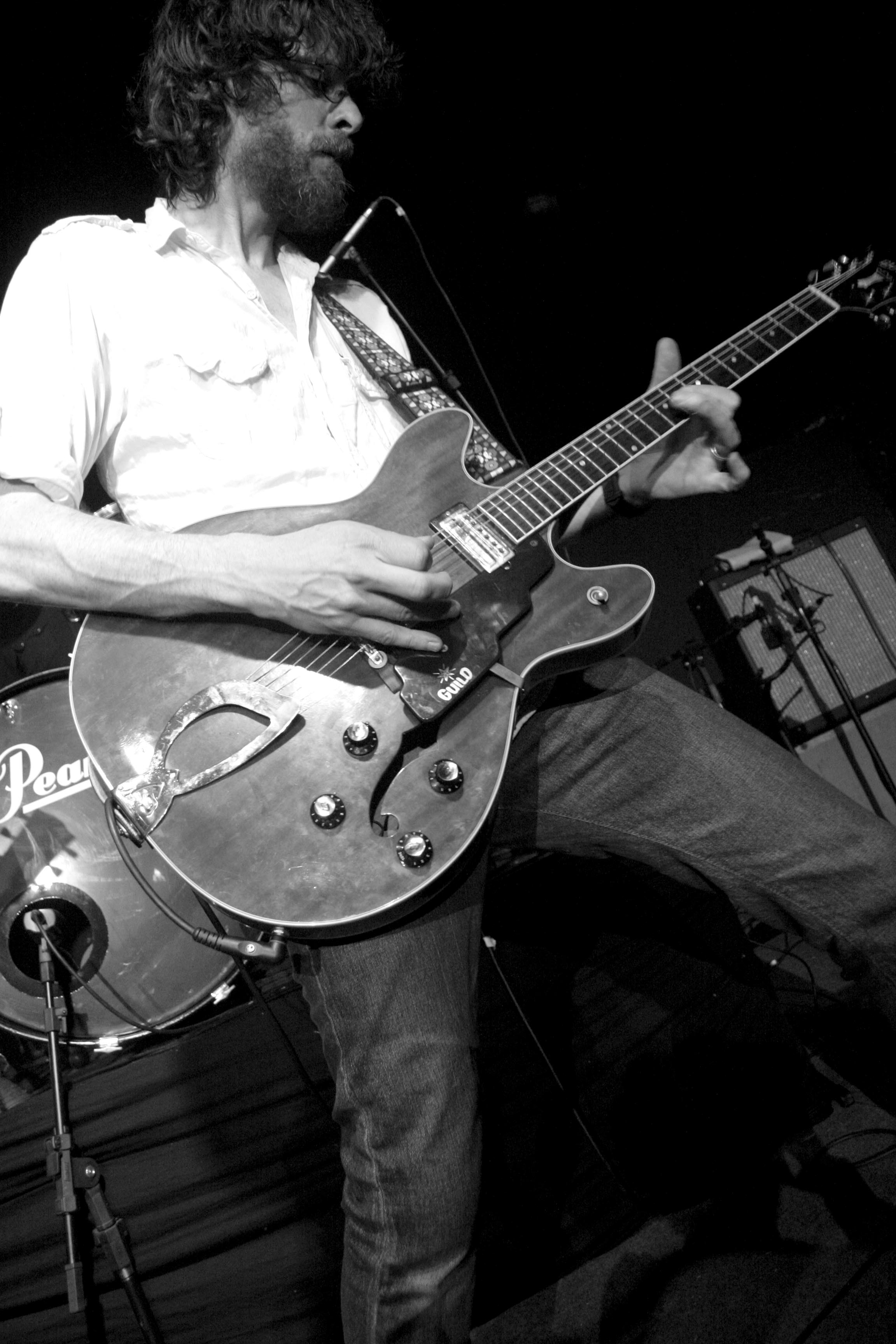
- Turner performing in 2007

Background information
- Born: Steven Neil Turner; March 28, 1965 (age 61); Houston, Texas, U.S.
- Genres: Alternative rock; grunge; punk rock
- Occupations: Guitarist, author
- Instruments: Guitar, bass, vocals

Steven Neil Turner (born March 28, 1965) is an American guitarist known for his work with Green River and Mudhoney.

== Early life ==
Turner was born in 1965 in Houston, Texas, but moved with his family to Seattle when he was two.

== Career ==
His first band was called The Ducky Boys. The lineup included future Pearl Jam member Stone Gossard. The Ducky Boys split around 1983. Turner later joined Mark Arm in Mr. Epp and the Calculations, which Arm described as "The worst band in the world". Mr. Epp played their final show with Turner in 1984.

Turner was also the first guitarist in Green River which again featured Arm and Gossard, and also acquired the services of Jeff Ament (later Pearl Jam) on bass guitar. Turner left the band in 1985, citing differences with the "careerist" Ament.

Arm and Turner started Mudhoney on New Year's Day, 1988. The Melvins bassist Matt Lukin was brought in, as was Dan Peters on drums. With Mudhoney, Turner recorded all their albums from Superfuzz Bigmuff in 1988 to Plastic Eternity in 2023.

Turner also has side projects such as The Thrown Ups, Monkeywrench, and played bass for a short time with legendary Seattle band The Fall-Outs. He also has released various solo recordings in a folk vein.

== Other work ==
Turner founded Super Electro, an independent record label, which ran from 1992 to 1998.

Turner's memoir, Mud Ride: A Messy Trip Through the Grunge Explosion, was published in North America by Chronicle Prism on June 13, 2023, and in the UK by Omnibus Press on June 8, 2023. It was co-written with music journalist, Adem Tepedelen.

== Discography ==
=== With Green River ===
Year	Title	Label	Track(s)
1985	Come on Down	Homestead	All
2016	1984 Demos	Jackpot Records	All
2019	Live at the Tropicana	Jackpot Records	All

=== Solo discography ===
Year	Title	Label	Format
2003	Searching for Melody	Roslyn Recordings	LP, CD
2004	Steve Turner and His Bad Ideas	Roslyn Recordings	LP, CD
2006	New Wave Punk Asshole	Funhouse	LP, CD
