= List of artists that appear on ROIR =

Following is a list of musical artists appearing on the ROIR record label, also known as Reach Out International Records, the New York City-based record label founded in 1979 by Neil Cooper.

== Artists ==
- 10 Foot Ganja Plant
- 8 Eyed Spy
- Adrenalin O.D.
- Laurel Aitken
- GG Allin
- Alpha & Omega
- Alphonia Tims and His Flying Tigers
- Badawi
- Bad Brains
- Bad Cop
- Beastie Boys
- Big Youth
- Black Uhuru
- Cedella Marley Booker
- Jonathan Borofsky
- Glenn Branca
- Glen Brown
- Brother D and Silver Fox
- Brother Vernard Johnson
- The Bush Chemists
- Bush Tetras
- Buzzcocks
- John Cale
- Joe "King" Carrasco
- James Chance and the Contortions
- Chocolate Watchband
- Christian Death
- Chicken Chest
- Deltones
- The Dickies
- The Dictators
- Digital K
- Disco Tex and His Sex-O-Lettes
- Dr. Israel
- Mikey Dread
- Durutti Column
- Dub Trio
- Dufus
- Dub Syndicate
- Einstürzende Neubauten
- Exterminator
- Exuma (musician)
- The Fleshtones
- Flipper
- Front Line Assembly
- Gato Negro
- Germs
- Peter Gordon
- Greater Than One
- Human Switchboard
- Richard Hell and the Voidoids
- Gregory Isaacs
- Jah Works
- Jazz Butcher
- Michael E. Johnson and Killer Bees
- King Tubby
- Mike Ladd
- Bill Laswell
- Jon Langford
- Legendary Pink Dots
- Llwybr Llaethog
- Lounge Lizards
- Lee "Scratch" Perry
- Malaria!
- Mekons
- Raz Mesinai
- Ras Michael
- Mute Beat
- Mad Professor
- MC5
- Mirrors
- R. Stevie Moore
- New York Dolls
- Nico
- Niney the Observer
- Judy Nylon
- Oku Onuora
- Pankow
- Phase Selector Sound
- Praxis
- Polyrock
- Prince Charles and the City Beat band
- Prince Far I
- Question Mark and the Mysterians
- The Raincoats
- Martin Rev
- Roots Tonic
- Royal Trux
- Ruts DC
- Roots Radics
- The Skatalites
- Skip and the Exciting Illusions
- Shox Lumania
- The Scientific Americans
- Suicide
- UK Subs
- Sex Gang Children
- The Stimulators
- The Styrenes
- Suns of Arqa
- Television
- Terrorists
- Johnny Thunders
- Twilight Circus Dub Sound System
- The Three Johns
- Univox
- Yabby U
- Steely and Clevie
