= Martin Rev (album) =

1980 studio album

Studio album by Martin Rev
- Released: February 1980
- Recorded: December 1979; 1991 (bonus tracks)
- Studio: Sorcerer Sound Recording Studios, New York City
- Genre: Synth-pop; no wave
- Length: 29:45 (original)
- Label: Infedility; Reachout International Records; Superior Viaduct
- Producer: Martin Rev and Charles Ball

Martin Rev chronology
Martin Rev (1980)	Clouds of Glory (1985)

Martin Rev is the debut solo album by Martin Rev. It was released in February 1980 on Lust/Unlust Music via their Infedility imprint. The album showcases the cerebral synth-pop sensibilities of its artist, who was one half of the pioneering synthpunk duo Suicide.

== Recording ==
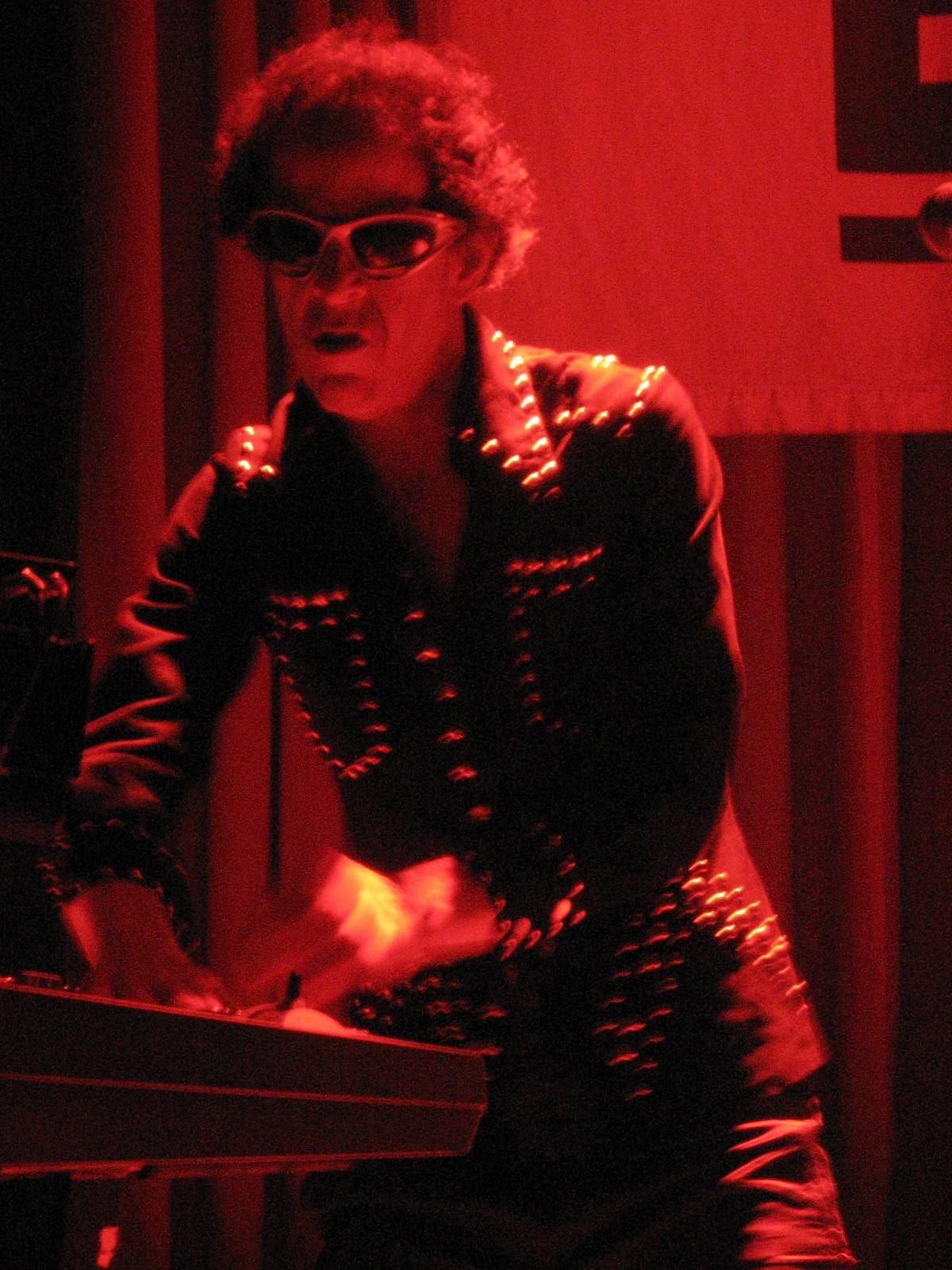
Martin Rev, pictured in 2005

Suicide's manager Marty Thau first approached Martin Reverby with the idea for him to record a solo album on Thau's Red Star Records in 1978, shortly after the release of Suicide's 1977 debut album on the same label. Rev was receptive, but Alan Vega (the other half of Suicide) felt it was too early for either artist to go solo. In the fall of 1979—by which point Suicide was in a touring lull and Red Star had been in financial trouble—Rev revived the idea for a solo album. He pitched it to Charles Ball, Suicide's live audio engineer in Europe. Ball was the owner of Lust/Unlust Music, which had a number of imprints devoted to various flavors of post-punk music, including Infedility, which was focused on no wave music from New York City. After Ball gave Rev the greenlight, Rev recorded the album in December 1979 at Sorcerer Sound Recording Studios, owned by Alan Fierstein and located at 19 Mercer Street. Martin Rev was recorded with synthesizer, rhythm machine, xylophone, piano, microphone, and eight-track recorder. Rev self-produced the album with Ball.

== Composition ==
Side one opens with "Mari", named after Rev's wife Mari Reverby (née Montgomery), who briefly played in Suicide in the early 1970s. It sports a dense, upbeat synthesizer melody with rhythm-machine percussion. "Baby O Baby", the only song on the album to feature vocals, has Rev singing with a guttural, monotone affect. "Nineteen 86" features distorted church bell samples while a synth riff runs in the background.

Side two opens with "Temptation", with xylophone providing the main melody, while deep and wooshing synth pulses provide counter-melody and ambiance. "Jomo" sports harmonium-esque drones underneath a bedrock of splashing synth noise and a motorik beat. "Asiá", the closing track, features piano and rhythm machine above synthesized organ and metallic echoing.

== Release ==
Martin Rev was released in February 1980 on Infedility, shortly before the release of Suicide's second album on ZE Records. In 1997, the album was re-released on Daft Records of the Netherlands as Marvel, with the bonus tracks "Coal Train" and "Marvel" (recorded later in 1991) added to the end of the original track list. In 2002, it was reissued under its original self-titled name on Reachout International Records (ROIR), featuring the aforementioned bonus tracks as well as three additional songs recorded in the same 1991 session: "5 to 5", "Wes", and "Daydreams". In 2013, Superior Viaduct reissued the album with the original 1980 track list.

== Reception ==
New York Rocker's Roy Trakin called the album a "particularly revelatory in capturing [Rev's] left-field genius". Tiny Mix Tapes's Clifford Allen described it as "full of stunningly beautiful passages ... it shouldn't be overlooked in any study of punk-era electronics or the Madagascan array of art that permeated Koch-era New York". Charlotte Robinson, reviewing the 2002 reissue in PopMatters, called it "an erratic and sometimes exhausting listen", inconsistent but overall interesting. She found the original tracks ultimately "reinforcing the assertion that Rev was 20 years ahead of his time". Jon Savage of The Guardian called it a "a prime, albeit forgotten example" of the 1980s golden age of electronic music: "[I]n its dark minimalism, it points forward to Plastikman, the Tresor artists and other future explorers".

== Track listing ==
All tracks are written by Martin Rev.

Side one
No.	Title	Length
1.	"Mari"	4:25
2.	"Baby O Baby"	4:47
3.	"Nineteen 86"	4:35

Side two
No.	Title	Length
4.	"Temptation"	7:18
5.	"Jomo"	4:40
6.	"Asiá"	4:00
Total length:		29:45

1997 bonus tracks
No.	Title	Length
7.	"Coal Train"	5:28
8.	"Marvel"	12:50
Total length:		48:03

2002 bonus tracks
No.	Title	Length
9.	"5 to 5"	2:00
10.	"Wes"	4:16
11.	"Daydreams"	5:22
Total length:		59:41
