= Ghost Riders (Suicide album) =

Live album by Suicide
- Released: 1986
- Recorded: September 19, 1981
- Venue: The Walker Art Center, Minneapolis, MN.
- Genre: Synth-punk
- Length: 42:04
- Label: ROIR
- Producer: Suicide

Suicide chronology
Half Alive (1981)	Ghost Riders (1986)	A Way of Life (1988)

Professional ratings
Review scores
Source	Rating
Allmusic	3/5 stars

Ghost Riders is a live performance album by Suicide, recorded in 1981 and released in 1986 by ROIR.

== Track listing ==
All tracks are written by Martin Rev and Alan Vega.

Side one
No.	Title	Length
1.	"Rocket USA"	4:53
2.	"Rock N' Roll (Is Killing My Life)"	5:14
3.	"Ghost Rider"	7:06
4.	"Dream Baby Dream"	6:18

Side two
No.	Title	Length
1.	"Sweet White Lady"	8:42
2.	"Harlem"	9:51

1990 CD issue bonus track
No.	Title	Writer(s)	Length
7.	"96 Tears" (Question Mark & the Mysterians cover)	Robert Martinez	4:38

== Personnel ==
Adapted from the Ghost Riders liner notes.

Suicide

- Martin Rev – keyboards, drum programming
- Alan Vega – vocals

Production and additional personnel

- Paul Marotta – mastering
- Mari Rev – cover art
- Suicide – production

== Release history ==
Region	Date	Label	Format	Catalog
United States	1986	ROIR	CS	A-145
France	1990	Danceteria	CD, LP	DAN 029
United States	1991	ROIR	CD	ROIR-145
United States	1998	ROIR	CD	RUS8239
United States	2006	ROIR	CD	RUS8239
