= Fight (Flipper album) =

Live album by Flipper
- Released: May 19, 2009
- Recorded: 2007
- Genre: Hardcore punk, noise rock
- Length: 46:12
- Language: English
- Label: MVD Audio
- Producer: Jack Endino

Flipper chronology
Live at CBGB's (1997)	Fight (2009)

Professional ratings
Review scores
Source	Rating
AllMusic	3.5/5 stars

Fight is the fifth live album by San Francisco-based punk rock band Flipper, released May 19, 2009 by MVD Audio. The album was recorded in 2007; the first four tracks were recorded at Funhouse in Seattle, Washington, and the next five at Dante's in Portland, Oregon.

== Track listing ==
No.	Title	Writer(s)	Length
1.	"Way of the World"	Bruce Loose/Ted Falconi/Steve DePace/Will Shatter	4:08
2.	"(I Saw You) Shine"	Loose/Falconi/DePace/Shatter	7:59
3.	"Be Good, Child!"	Loose/Falconi/DePace/Krist Novoselic	2:06
4.	"Why Can't You See?"	Loose/Falconi/DePace/Novoselic	7:41
5.	"Night Fails"	Loose/Falconi/DePace/Novoselic	6:08
6.	"Ha Ha Ha"	Loose/Falconi/DePace/Shatter	2:46
7.	"Triple Mass"	Loose/Falconi/DePace/Novoselic	4:24
8.	"Sacrifice"	Loose/Falconi/DePace/Shatter	5:41
9.	"The Light, the Sound, the Rhythm, the Noise"	Loose/Falconi/DePace/Shatter	5:23

Tracks 3, 4, 5, 7 appear on the studio album Love. Tracks 1, 2 appear on the album Album – Generic Flipper. Tracks 8, 9 appear on the album Gone Fishin'. Track 6 from the "Love Canal" 7" single.

== Personnel ==
Flipper

- Bruce Loose – lead vocals
- Ted Falconi – guitar
- Krist Novoselic – bass guitar, backing vocals
- Steve DePace – drums

Production

- Jack Endino – recording, mixing
- Gary Hobish – mastering
- Nicholas Evans – live sound engineer (Funhouse 2006–2010)
