= Alan Vega 70th Birthday Limited Edition EP Series =

- Artwork for Dream Baby Dream, the first EP in the series. Photograph taken by Edward Mapplethorpe.

EP series by various artists
- Released: October 28, 2008 – July 6, 2010
- Recorded: 1976–2009
- Length: 112:18
- Label: Blast First Petite
- Producer: various

Alan Vega 70th Birthday Limited Edition EP Series is a series of eight EPs with contributions from various artists paying tribute to Alan Vega and his band Suicide. The individual 10" vinyl EPs were pressed in limited quantities and released through the London-based label Blast First Petite. According to the project's press release, the series was originally intended to be a monthly year-long series across 12 EPs, but ended up being released periodically over three years starting in 2008, continuing into 2010. The series launched with simultaneous releases of Dream Baby Dream and Shadazz on October 28, 2008. Each EP features one or two artists covering either a Suicide or Alan Vega solo track, paired with either a previously unreleased live or demo version of a Suicide or Vega solo song. Most releases in the series featured what Blast First referred to as a "major" artist and also an "upcoming" artist. Most of the EPs were also released digitally around the time of the 10" vinyl release, with some seeing limited-edition CD releases as well.

== Song information ==
Bruce Springsteen met Vega in the 1970s and had been a big fan of his work ever since, stating that he appreciated the dreamy direction of his music. Beginning with his 2005 Devils & Dust Tour, Springsteen incorporated a cover of Suicide's song "Dream Baby Dream" into many of his live performances over the years, and even recorded a studio version for his 2014 album High Hopes. One of his performances of "Dream Baby Dream" from the 2005 tour was recorded and used for his contribution to the Alan Vega 70th Birthday Limited Edition EP Series. The Guardian praised the track for reinterpreting the lyrics and tone to be more hopeful than Vega's dark version; a change that Vega himself appreciated. In 2005, Vega said of the Springsteen cover: "A lot of bands have done my stuff, Suicide stuff, and they basically try and copy and do it the way that you do it. Thank God – finally somebody did their version of it. He did it his way, and such a great way, that I'm going to have to sing it that way, or not sing it at all any more."

British rock band Primal Scream covered Suicide's "Diamonds, Fur Coat, Champagne" from 1980 album Suicide: Alan Vega and Martin Rev. The band chose the song because they, "loved the lyric and also its sci-fi futuristic sound." On a separate EP in the series, German techno musician Thomas Brinkmann contributed a reinterpretation of "Diamonds, Fur Coat, Champagne" as a "loping dancefloor" anthem. Primal Scream invited French electronic musician Miss Kittin to collaborate on the track to help bring out the pop influences in the song. American singer and poet Lydia Lunch covered "Frankie Teardrop". Alan Vega and Martin Rev were two of Lunch's first friends when she arrived in Manhattan, and she has performed her rendition of "Frankie Teardrop" at an annual Suicide tribute concert.

Several artists mentioned in the series' press release as contributing to the collection were absent from the finished product. Those include Grinderman (feat. Nick Cave), Spiritualized, Julian Cope, Vincent Gallo, Liars, HTRK, and S.C.U.M.

== Reception ==
The tributary EPs that comprise the Alan Vega 70th Birthday Limited Edition EP Series were generally well received by music critics. Jim Allen of AllMusic said the Dream Baby Dream EP was likely to garner the most attention due to Springsteen's name recognition, and said his live performance was "ethereal and haunting". In a separate review, Allen said the Horrors' cover of "Shadazz" stayed true to the source material while the song also "switches up their usual garage-punk style for more of a sleek, electronic-tinged sound." Anthony Tognazzini of AllMusic said the pairing of Primal Scream's interpretation of "Diamonds, Fur Coat, Champagne" with an old demo of Suicide's "Ghost Rider", "makes for an intriguing post-punk curio, not to mention a thoroughly satisfying listen."

Vega himself was very pleased with the results of the EP series and the covers of his songs. In a press release for Klaxon's Sweetheart EP, Vega said, "I'm knocked out by these new versions, they just keep on coming and coming and their like whole new worlds to me.... so completely different.... and some of these new upcoming bands man, they've really got into it. It's really great. It's like a soap opera you know, what's gonna happen in the next episode!"

== Track listings ==
EP #1 – Dream Baby Dream – October 28, 2008
No.	Title	Writer(s)	Track artist	Length
1.	"Dream Baby Dream" (live from 2005 Devils & Dust Tour)	Martin Rev, Alan Vega	Bruce Springsteen	6:55
2.	"Dream Baby Dream" (live from The Midnight Special 1978)	Rev, Vega	Suicide	3:51
3.	"Mr. Ray"		Beat the Devil	5:30

EP #2 – Shadazz – October 28, 2008
No.	Title	Writer(s)	Track artist	Length
1.	"Shadazz"	Rev, Vega	The Horrors	4:18
2.	"Radiation" (live 1980)		Suicide	5:06
3.	"Rocket U.S.A."	Rev, Vega	Nik Void (Nikki Colk)	3:58

EP #3 – Frankie Teardrop – November 25, 2008
No.	Title	Writer(s)	Track artist	Length
1.	"Frankie Teardrop"	Rev, Vega	Lydia Lunch	5:33
2.	"Frankie Teardrop vs the Space Alien" (1976 Demo)		Suicide	13:04

EP #4 – Diamonds, Fur Coat, Champagne – March 30, 2009
No.	Title	Writer(s)	Track artist	Length
1.	"Diamonds, Fur Coat, Champagne"	Rev, Vega	Primal Scream (feat. Miss Kittin)	3:33
2.	"Ghost Rider" (Demo 1976)	Rev, Vega	Suicide	2:47
3.	"Diamonds, Furcoat, Champagne"	Rev, Vega	Conrad Standish	6:10

EP #5 – Che – August 4, 2009
No.	Title	Writer(s)	Track artist	Length
1.	"Che"	Rev, Vega	Sunn O))) & Pan Sonic	6:00
2.	"13 Crosses, 16 Blazin' Skulls" (Live 2008)	Vega	Alan Vega	5:57
3.	"Goodbye Darling"	Mark Kuch, Vega	Stephen Burroughs	4:05

EP #6 – Sweetheart – October 19, 2009
No.	Title	Writer(s)	Track artist	Length
1.	"Sweetheart"	Rev, Vega	Klaxons	3:52
2.	"Speedway"	Vega	Alan Vega	2:35
3.	"Super Subway Comedian"		No Bra	3:46

EP #7 – Ghost Rider – July 6, 2010
No.	Title	Writer(s)	Track artist	Length
1.	"Ghost Rider"	Rev, Vega	Gavin Friday & David Ball	2:52
2.	"Diamonds, Furcoats, Champagne"	Rev, Vega	Thomas Brinkmann	5:50
3.	"Puss on tha Time Warp"	Vega	Alan Vega	4:03

EP #8 – Jonny – July 6, 2010
No.	Title	Writer(s)	Track artist	Length
1.	"Jonny"	Rev, Vega	Peaches	2:01
2.	"Universe"	Rev, Vega	Effi Briest	6:01
3.	"No Tomorrow"		Alan Vega	4:31
