= Half Alive (album) =

Compilation album by Suicide
- Released: September 9, 1981
- Recorded: 1974 – 1979
- Genre: Synthpunk
- Length: 37:15
- Label: ROIR

Suicide chronology
Suicide: Alan Vega and Martin Rev (1980)	Half Alive (1981)	Ghost Riders (1986)

Professional ratings
Review scores
Source	Rating
Allmusic	4/5 stars
Select	3/5 medals

Half Alive is a compilation album by Suicide, originally released on cassette only on September 9, 1981 by ROIR. It is composed of live recordings from 1978 and home and studio demos recorded between 1974 and 1979.

== Track listing ==
All tracks are written by Martin Rev and Alan Vega.

Side one
No.	Title	Length
1.	"Harlem II" (recorded live at CBGB's, 1978)	3:58
2.	"Goin' to Las Vegas" (recorded live at CBGB's, 1978)	4:16
3.	"Love You" (recorded at Suicide Home Studio, 1979)	2:46
4.	"Cool as Ice" (recorded at Suicide Home Studio, 1979)	3:19
5.	"All Night Long" (recorded live at Horseshoe Club, Toronto, 1978)	4:10

Side two
No.	Title	Length
1.	"Sister Ray Says" (recorded live at Marquee, London, 1978)	4:26
2.	"Johnny Dance" (recorded live at Marquee, London, 1978)	3:01
3.	"Space Blue" (recorded at Suicide Home Studio, 1974/75)	1:47
4.	"Long Talk" (recorded at Suicide Home Studio, 1974/75)	1:27
5.	"Speed Queen" (recorded at Suicide Home Studio, 1974/75)	2:27
6.	"Chezazze" (recorded at Suicide Home Studio, 1979)	3:25
7.	"Dreams" (recorded at Sun Dragon Studio, 1975)	2:13

2000 CD re-issue bonus track
No.	Title	Length
13.	"All Night Long" (recorded live in the UK, 1978)	4:31
14.	"Sweetheart" (recorded live in the UK, 1978)	4:44
15.	"Scream and Shout" (recorded live in the UK, 1978)	4:17

== Personnel ==
Adapted from the Half Alive liner notes.

Suicide

- Martin Rev – keyboards, drum programming
- Alan Vega – vocals

Production and additional personnel

- John Hanti – executive production
- Stanley Moskowitz – mastering
- Jim Sclavunos – design
- Wayne Vlcan – mixing

== Release history ==
Region	Date	Label	Format	Catalog
United States	1981	ROIR	CS	A 103
Italy	1990	Contempo	CD, LP	CONTE148
Japan	1993	Meldac	CD	MECR-25022
United States	2000	ROIR	CD, LP	RUS 8264
