= Why Be Blue =

Studio album by Suicide
- Released: 1992
- Recorded: One Take Studios, New York City
- Genre: Synthpop, electronic
- Length: 41:10
- Label: Brake Out
- Producer: Ric Ocasek

Suicide chronology
A Way of Life (1988)	Why Be Blue (1992)	American Supreme (2002)

Professional ratings
Review scores
Source	Rating
Allmusic	2.5/5 stars

Why Be Blue is the fourth studio album by Suicide, originally released in 1992 by Brake Out Records. It was reissued on Mute Records Blast First sub-label in 2005 containing a new remix of the entire album by keyboardist Martin Rev, a revised track order, new artwork, plus an additional disc of live material from 1989.

== Track listing ==
All tracks are written by Martin Rev and Alan Vega.

No.	Title	Length
1.	"Why Be Blue"	4:33
2.	"Cheat-Cheat"	4:02
3.	"Hot Ticket"	3:59
4.	"Universe"	3:56
5.	"Last Time"	3:35
6.	"Play the Dream"	4:24
7.	"Pump It"	3:50
8.	"Flashy Love"	4:43
9.	"Chewy-Chewy"	3:57
10.	"Mujo"	4:11

== 2005 Track listing ==
Disc 1 – Remixed by Martin Rev

No.	Title	Length
1.	"Why Be Blue?"	4:33
2.	"Cheat-Cheat"	4:04
3.	"Mujo"	4:10
4.	"Pump It"	3:52
5.	"Last Time"	3:36
6.	"Play the Dream"	4:25
7.	"Chewy-Chewy"	3:56
8.	"Hot Ticket"	4:02
9.	"Flashy Love"	4:44
10.	"Universe"	4:00

Disc 2 – Live at Le Palace, Paris / 17 April 1989

No.	Title	Length
1.	"C'est La Vie"	7:02
2.	"Johnny"	5:04
3.	"Mambo Mambo"	6:18
4.	"Rock Train"	8:36
5.	"Jukebox Baby '96"	7:40
6.	"Dream Baby Dream"	6:56
7.	"Night Time"	8:04
8.	"On Fire"	5:12

== Personnel ==
Adapted from the Why Be Blue liner notes.

Suicide

- Martin Rev – keyboards, drum programming
- Alan Vega – vocals

Production and additional personnel

- David Heglmeier – engineering
- Brad Johnson – mastering
- Ric Ocasek – production

== Release history ==
Region	Date	Label	Format	Catalog
United Kingdom	1988	Chapter 22	CD, LP	CHAP 35
United States/UK	2005	Blast First/Mute/EMI	CD	BFFP 191/07243 8 63538 0 1
