= Surrender (Suicide song) =

Single by Suicide

from the album A Way of Life
- B-side: "Rain of Ruin"
- Released: 1988
- Recorded: December 13, 1987 at Right Track Recording, NY
- Genre: Synthpop, doo-wop, dream pop
- Length: 3:47
- Label: Chapter 22
- Songwriters: Martin Rev, Alan Vega
- Producer: Ric Ocasek

Suicide singles chronology
"Dream Baby Dream" (1979)	"Surrender" (1988)

"Surrender" is a single by the synthpop band Suicide, written by its members Martin Rev and Alan Vega. It was released as a single in 1988 by Chapter 22.

== Formats and track listing ==
All songs written by Martin Rev and Alan Vega

UK 12" single (CHAP 36)

1. "Surrender" – 3:48
2. "Rain of Ruin" – 4:03

== Personnel ==
Adapted from the Surrender liner notes.

Suicide

- Martin Rev – keyboards
- Alan Vega – vocals

Production and additional personnel

- Joe Barbaria – engineering
- Ric Ocasek – production

== Charts ==
Chart (1989)	Peak position
UK Indie Chart	13

== Release history ==
Region	Date	Label	Format	Catalog
United Kingdom	1988	Chapter 22	LP	CHAP 36
France	1988	Accord	LP	102277
