= Public Flipper Limited Live 1980–1985 =

Public Flipper Limited

Live album by Flipper
- Released: 1986
- Labels: Subterranean Records (original release); Water Records (2008 CD reissue); 4 Men With Beards (2009 LP reissue); Fundamental Records (original release); Domino Records (2009 reissue)

Flipper chronology
Blow'n Chunks (1984)	Public Flipper Limited (1986)	Nurnberg Fish Trials (1991)

Professional ratings
Review scores
Source	Rating
Robert Christgau	B+
The Rolling Stone Album Guide	3/5 stars
Spin Alternative Record Guide	5/10

Public Flipper Limited is the second live album by San Francisco-based punk rock band Flipper, released in 1986 by Subterranean Records. It contains recordings from 1980–85. The title is a nod to John Lydon's post-punk outfit Public Image Ltd. Earlier the same year Public Image Ltd. had released an album titled Album whose title resembled that of Flipper's debut release, Album.

== Critical reception ==
Trouser Press wrote that the "obnoxious onstage patter only adds to the mind-boggling raucous entertainment."

== Track list ==
=== Side 1 (20:46) ===
1. New Rules No Rules (2/24/80, San Francisco) (2:19)
2. Hard Cold World (3/14/82, Washington DC) (7:47)
3. I'm Fighting (2/24/80, San Francisco) (2:40)
4. The Game's Got a Price (11/15/80, San Francisco) (8:00)

=== Side 2 (22:10) ===
1. Love Canal (9/6/80, Berkeley) (4:03)
2. Oh-Oh-Ay-Oh (2/24/80, San Francisco) (1:44)
3. We Don't Understand (2/6/82, San Francisco) (7:30)
4. If I Can't Be Drunk (6/22/82, San Francisco) (8:53)

=== Side 3 (20:53) ===
1. Sex Bomb (12/31/84, New York City) (10:21)
2. Brainwash (3/14/82, Washington DC) (0:59)
3. (I Saw You) Shine (4/1/82, San Francisco) (9:33)

=== Side 4 (22:00) ===
1. Southern California (1/26/85, Los Angeles) (4:43)
2. Life (8/6/83, Berkeley) (5:42)
3. The Wheel (2/6/82, San Francisco) (5:19)
4. Flipper Blues (1/5/85, Toronto) (6:16)

== Personnel ==
- Ted Falconi – guitar
- Steve DePace – drums
- Bruce Loose – vocals, bass
- Will Shatter – vocals, bass
