= Thomas Brinkmann =

German record producer (born 1959)

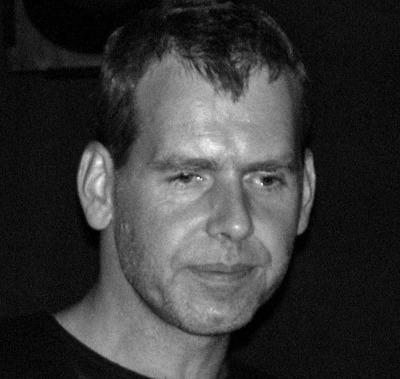
- Thomas Brinkmann at Empty Bottle in 2004

Background information
- Also known as: Ester Brinkmann; Soul Center
- Born: 1959 (age 66–67); Mönchengladbach, Germany
- Genre: Minimal techno
- Occupation: Record producer
- Years active: 1998–present
- Labels: Max Ernst; Editions Mego; Frozen Reeds

Thomas Brinkmann (born 1959) is a German record producer from Mönchengladbach. He is the founder of the record label Max Ernst.

== Biography ==
Brinkmann began experimenting with records in the early eighties and released re-workings of material by fellow artists Mike Ink and Richie Hawtin in the second half of the 1990s. These productions were made by playing physically modified vinyl records on highly customized turntables with an additional tone arm.

Brinkmann later founded the Ernst record label and introduced his own productions on a series of 12" records taking their titles from female names. He has also produced for labels such as Traum Schallplatten, Raster-Noton, and Mute Records (under the Soul Center alias).

In 2010, he contributed a cover of Suicide's song "Diamonds, Furcoats, Champagne" for the Alan Vega 70th Birthday Limited Edition EP Series.

In 2017, he performed his collaboration with Derek Piotr "Absolute Grey", at ISSUE Project Room in NYC.

In 2018, he contributed the piece "Wiener" to Stephan Mathieu's SCALE project.

Thomas Brinkmann's tracks Olga Al and Sym feature on the soundtrack of the film John & Jane by Ashim Ahluwalia.

== Discography ==
=== Studio albums ===
- Tokyo + 1 (Max Ernst, 2004)
- Lucky Hands (Max Ernst, 2005)
- When Horses Die (Max Ernst, 2008)
- What You Hear (Is What You Hear) (Editions Mego, 2015)
- A 1000 Keys (Editions Mego, 2016)
- A Certain Degree of Stasis (Frozen Reeds, 2016)
