= Neil Cooper =

Neil Cooper may refer to:

- Neil Cooper (drummer) (born 1973), drummer who has played for Therapy? and other bands
- Neil Cooper (footballer) (born 1958), Scottish football player and manager
- Neil Cooper (record executive) (1930–2001), founder of record company ROIR (Reachout International Records)
- Neil Cooper (Hollyoaks), a fictional character from British soap opera Hollyoaks

== See also ==
- Neale Cooper (1963–2018), Scottish football player and manager
