= 21½ Minutes in Berlin/23 Minutes in Brussels =

Live album by Suicide
- Released: 1978
- Recorded: July 30, 1978 at Neue Welt; June 16, 1978 at the Ancienne Belgique, Brussels
- Genre: Synthpop
- Label: Red Star

Suicide chronology
Suicide (1977)	21½ Minutes in Berlin/23 Minutes in Brussels (1978)	Suicide: Alan Vega and Martin Rev (1980)

Professional ratings
Review scores
Source	Rating
Allmusic	2/5 stars

21½ Minutes in Berlin/23 Minutes in Brussels is a live performance album by Suicide, released in 1978 by Red Star Records. The B-side of the album is infamous for the audience's raucous revulsion toward the duo's performance, providing "some indication of the public's reaction to this confrontational duo in their heyday". 23 Minutes in Brussels remained largely unheard until its release in 1998 with the reissue of the band's self-titled debut album. 21½ Minutes in Berlin remains out of print.

== Background and summary ==
The A-side, 21½ Minutes in Berlin, documents a recording of the duo at Neue Welt concert hall in Berlin, Germany, on July 30, 1978.

The B-side, 23 Minutes in Brussels, documents a live performance by Suicide on June 16, 1978, at the Ancienne Belgique in Brussels, Belgium, while supporting Elvis Costello and The Clash. A friend of the band, Howard Thompson, recorded the performance on cassette tape, and it was later released as a flexi-disc insert for a music magazine. In 2000, while Mute Records was rereleasing Suicide's catalog, the tape was remastered and included as a bonus track for their first album. The entire performance is mixed as a single track.

Before Suicide even starts playing, booing can be heard from the crowd indicating that they wanted to hear the main act, Elvis Costello, straight away. Suicide is introduced and begins to play "Ghost Rider". Once it ends, there is booing from the crowd. The second song is "Rocket U.S.A". After that, at roughly 9:30, the audience can be heard chanting "Elvis! Elvis!". This attitude continues through the third and fourth songs, "Cheree" and "Dance".

The audience becomes more active during the performance of "Frankie Teardrop". At roughly 19:30, loud applause can be heard; someone steals Alan Vega's microphone (a woman at 20:35 can be heard saying "They took the mic"). Shortly afterwards, the music stops and the promoter comes on, warning the audience that if they don't give the microphone back, there will be "no show". Vega joins in, swearing at the audience. After receiving the microphone, he continues to sing "Frankie Teardrop" a cappella. After even more booing, Vega shouts "Shut the fuck up! This is about Frankie!". A few moments later, there is rapturous applause as the band leaves the stage.

Later, Elvis Costello played a very short and angry set in which he made no secret of his outrage over Suicide's treatment by the crowd. This incited a riot. The show was cancelled and Vega's nose was broken. The story is detailed in the liner notes of the 2000 re-release.

== Reception ==
Suicide would only become famous after the peak of their activity was over. During the 1980s and 90s, they were responsible for influencing many bands and shaping genres such as industrial music, dance music and notably electroclash. This performance has been called "a record of proof of an innovative band’s struggle with an unreceptive audience" and has been compared to the audience's reactions to Dylan going electric. It also "clearly demonstrates two individuals flying in the face of convention, screaming their guts out to be heard, and failing to make a poignant imprint on the listening audience". Allmusic said that "though the (reissues) extra tracks dilute the original album's impact somewhat, they're worthwhile supplements to one of the punk era's most startlingly unique works". In review of their debut album for 1001 Albums You Must Hear Before You Die, Chris Shade called it a "riotous comedy", and noted that "(their) lack of rock 'n' roll accoutrements such as a drummer or guitarist often aroused violent reactions in their bewildered audiences".

The 1995 song "23 Minutes in Brussels" by the band Luna — "23 minutes in Brussels / Why can't they just leave us alone / Are we gonna get into a tussle / Cannot take an airplane home" — is a reference to the Suicide concert.

== Track listing ==
All tracks are written by Martin Rev and Alan Vega, except "96 Tears" by Robert Martinez.

Side one – 21½ Minutes in Berlin
No.	Title	Length
1.	"Ghost Rider"
2.	"Rocket USA"
3.	"Cheree"
4.	"Harlem"
5.	"96 Tears" (Question Mark & the Mysterians cover)

Side two – 23 Minutes in Brussels
No.	Title	Length
1.	"Ghost Rider"
2.	"Rocket USA"
3.	"Cheree"
4.	"Dance"
5.	"Frankie Teardrop"

== Personnel ==
Adapted from the 21½ Minutes in Berlin/23 Minutes in Brussels liner notes.

Suicide

- Martin Rev – keyboards, drum programming
- Alan Vega – vocals

== Release history ==
Region	Date	Label	Format	Catalog
United Kingdom	1978	Red Star	LP	FRANKIE 1
