= Ancienne Belgique =

Concert hall in Brussels, Belgium

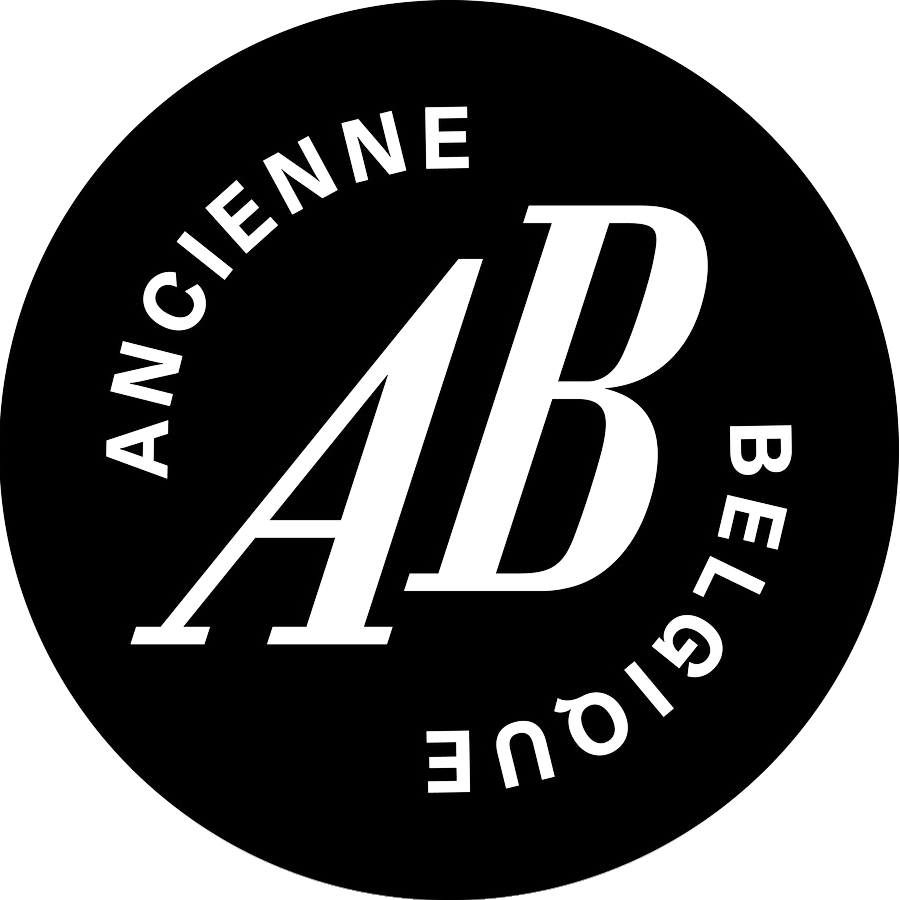

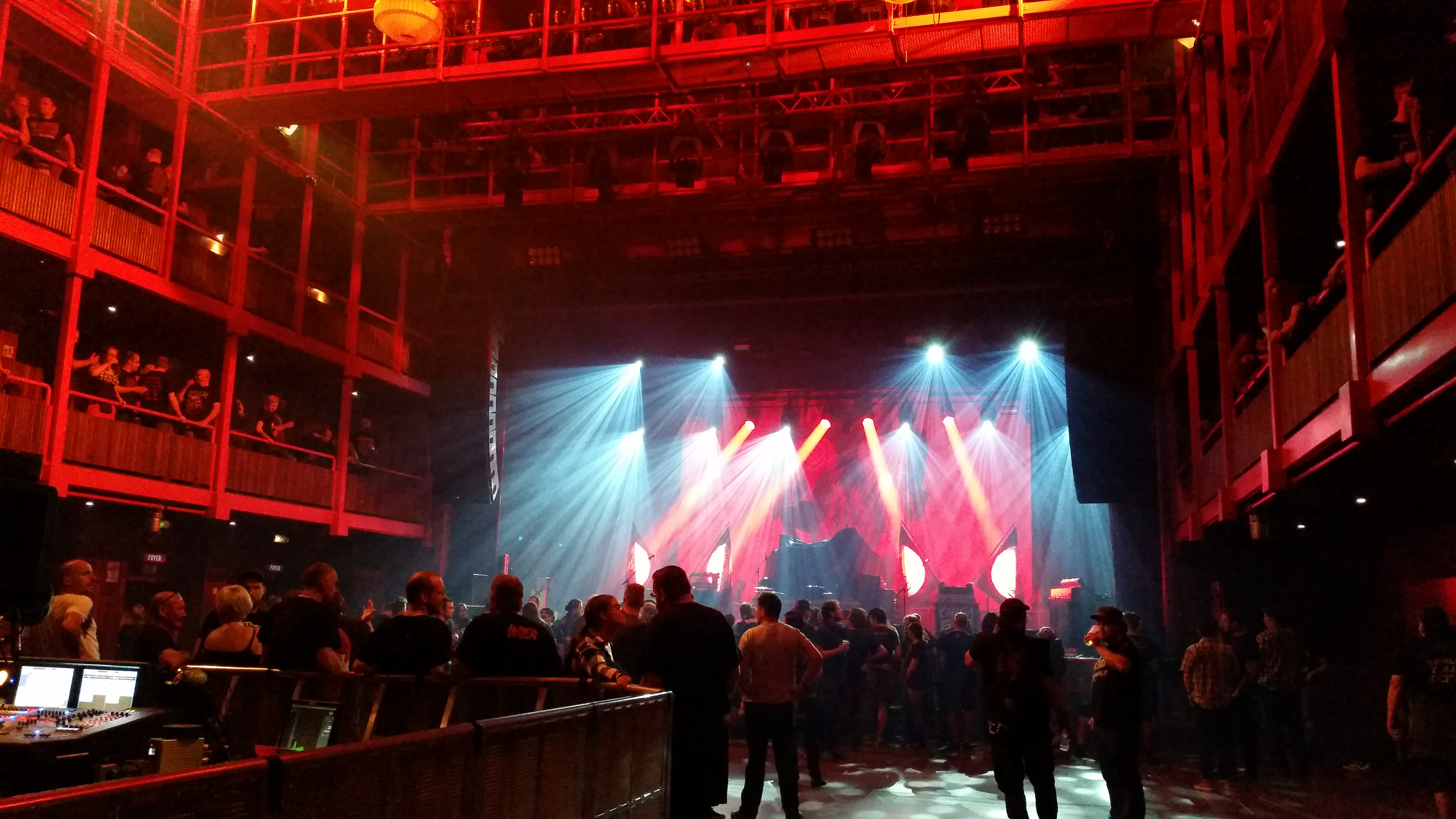
- A concert taking place in the main hall
- Interactive map of Ancienne Belgique
- Address: Boulevard Anspach / Anspachlaan 110; 1000 City of Brussels, Brussels-Capital Region; Belgium
- Coordinates: 50°50′49″N 4°20′55″E
- Operator: Ancienne Belgique
- Capacity: 2,000 (main hall), 250 (ABClub)
- Type: Concert hall

Construction
- Opened: 1857
- Renovated: 1992

Website
- www.abconcerts.be/en

The Ancienne Belgique (French for 'Old Belgium') (AB) is a concert hall for contemporary music in Brussels, Belgium. Located in the historic heart of Brussels, it is one of the leading concert venues in Belgium, hosting a wide variety of international and local acts. Some 300,000 people attend a concert at the "AB" every year.

== The venue ==
The venue consists of three concert halls: the "Main Hall", the "ABBox", and the "ABClub". The Main Hall is, logically, the Ancienne Belgique's main hall, and has a capacity of 2,000 people. It is considered one of the best concert halls in Europe for its acoustics. The ABBox is the latest addition to the Ancienne Belgique. It is the same space as the Main Hall, but rearranged for greater intimacy: the seats in the back and the balconies at the sides of the hall are covered, limiting its capacity to 800 people. The ABBox is the Ancienne Belgique's response to the need for a smaller concert hall to host less well-known acts, helping them gain a new and larger audience. The ABClub has a capacity of approximately 250 people, and hosts smaller, up-and-coming acts.

== Notable concerts ==
- In January 1955, Jacques Brel supported the performances of the Belgian pop and variety pioneer Bobbejaan Schoepen for one week.
- Suicide performed at the Ancienne Belgique on 16 June 1978. The crowd was hostile, wanting to hear the main act (Elvis Costello), and the members of Suicide antagonised the audience further during the performance. The recorded performance, on which many confrontational exchanges can be heard, was eventually released as 23 Minutes in Brussels.
- In 1982, The Cure played a concert which ended in a fight between band-members on stage. The band split up right after this gig, yet reformed months later.
- Circa 1986, Ancienne Belgique hosted a popular club night with DJ "Fat" Ronny Harmsen whose distinctive DJ-ing style, dubbed "AB" music after the club's initials, laid the groundwork for the emergence of the New Beat genre.
- The Domino festival, which was held annually from 1999 to 2011, hosted some underground artists that later broke into the mainstream.
- AJR performed here on 11 October 2022 on their tour supporting their album "OK Orchestra".

== Albums and videos recorded at the Ancienne Belgique ==
- In 1999, Iggy Pop performed a concert that was recorded on a DVD and made available with his 2005 release A Million in Prizes.
- In 2000, the rock band Oasis played a notable concert which was taped by MTV.
- Magnolia Electric Co.'s live album, Trials & Errors, was recorded at Ancienne Belgique in April 2003 and released in January 2005.
- The Hives' 2004 performance was released as the live DVD Tussles in Brussels.
- Róisín Murphy released the limited double CD Live at Ancienne Belgique in November 2007.
- Yeasayer released a live album Live at Ancienne Belgique, which was recorded on 28 October 2010 in the venue.
- Kings of Leon released a limited edition EP in 2004, Day Old Belgian Blues, which was recorded at the ABBox.
- Monster Magnet placed two songs from a 2014 performance (which also was the debut for recent bassist Chris Kosnik) at the AB on Milking the Stars: A Re-Imagining of Last Patrol. The songs chosen were "Last Patrol" and "Three Kingfishers".
- Calexico released three live albums recorded at the Ancienne Belgique in 2008 and 2012.
- Netsky went to Ancienne Belgique in 2012 for his song "Give & Take".
- King Gizzard & the Lizard Wizard's performances at Ancienne Belgique on 8 and 9 October 2019 were released in 2020 as Live in Brussels '19. It was also partially included in their 2020 concert film Chunky Shrapnel.
- Queens of the Stone Age, Therapy?, Lamb and Chvrches released songs that were recorded in the main hall.

== See also ==
- List of concert halls
- History of Brussels
- Culture of Belgium
- Belgium in the long nineteenth century
