= A Way of Life (Suicide album) =

Studio album by Suicide
- Released: 1988
- Recorded: December 13, 1987
- Studios: Right Track Recording, New York
- Genres: Synth-pop, drone rock
- Length: 39:24
- Label: Chapter 22, Wax Trax! Records
- Producer: Ric Ocasek

Suicide chronology
Ghost Riders (1986)	A Way of Life (1988)	Why Be Blue (1992)

Professional ratings
Review scores
Source	Rating
Allmusic	3.5/5 stars

A Way of Life is the third studio album by Suicide, released in 1988. It was first distributed by Chapter 22 Records, then received wider global distribution through Wax Trax! Records a year later. Visual artist Stefan Roloff produced a music video for the song "Dominic Christ" and Suicide went overseas to promote the album by performing the single "Surrender" in Paris which was aired on French television. In 2005, it was remastered containing a slight remix by Martin Rev and redistributed by Mute Record's Blast First sub-label with an additional disc of live material.

== Track listing ==
All tracks are written by Martin Rev and Alan Vega.

No.	Title	Length
1.	"Wild in Blue"	4:34
2.	"Surrender"	3:47
3.	"Jukebox Baby 96"	3:21
4.	"Rain of Ruin"	4:00
5.	"Suffering in Vain"	4:40
6.	"Dominic Christ"	6:46
7.	"Love So Lovely"	4:03
8.	"Devastation"	4:00
9.	"Heat Beat"	4:13

== Personnel ==
Adapted from the A Way of Life liner notes.

Suicide

- Martin Rev – keyboards, drum programming
- Alan Vega – vocals

Production and additional personnel

- Joe Barbaria – engineering
- Ric Ocasek – production

== Release history ==
Region	Date	Label	Format	Catalog
United Kingdom	1988	Chapter 22	CD, LP	CHAP 35
United States	1988	Wax Trax!	CD, LP	WAX 7072
France	1988	Accord	CD, LP	10227
Germany	1988	Rough Trade	CD, LP	RTD 96
United States/Europe	2005	Blast First/Mute/EMI	CD	BFFP 178/07243 8 63500 0 8
