= American Supreme =

Studio album by Suicide
- Released: October 28, 2002
- Length: 55:13
- Label: Mute
- Producer: Suicide

Suicide chronology
Why Be Blue (1992)	American Supreme (2002)

American Supreme is the fifth and final studio album by the American band Suicide. It was released in 2002 on Mute Records and was the group's first self-produced album. The album received generally favorable reception with positive reviews praising its experimental and difficult listening experience while negative reviews found the album sounding dated even in comparison to the group's first two albums released decades prior.

== Production ==
After the release of their previous studio album Why Be Blue? in 1992, Alan Vega and Martin Rev discussed a follow-up for years with Vega stating that "nothing jump started us right away" The group felt encouraged to record new material after Mute Records began re-issuing some of the group's older albums. Rev gave Vega around 20 songs to choose 10 to 12 from to work on.

== Style ==
American Supreme contains elements of free jazz, hip hop, and disco music.

== Release ==
American Supreme was released on October 28, 2002 in the United Kingdom and October 29, 2002 in the United States.

== Reception ==
American Supreme received generally favorable reviews. At Metacritic, which assigns a normalized rating out of 100 to reviews from mainstream critics, the album has received an average score of 66, based on ten reviews. Uncut and The Wire gave the most positive reviews referring to the album as "audaciously modern in its textural absorption of outre sounds from the 21st-century dance underground" and "Possibly their best [album]". New York Magazine praised the album's experimental side, noting that "Even in its least compelling (or completely annoying) moments, there's a refreshing daftness and a disregard of the confining structures that rule electronic music." Online music zine Pitchfork gave the album a 7.0 out of 10, referring to it as an album that will not warrant repeated listens, and "even at its most unlistenable and monotonous, still makes its point."

Allmusic gave the album a negative review of two stars out of five opining that the album sounded even more dated than the duo's first two albums released decades prior. Q also commented on the dated sound of the album, stating that the group "unfortunately discovered dance music several years too late." PopMatters found the album strayed too far from the group's style on their earlier albums, noting that "Suicide now seem like band struggling to find their true sonic spirit, like their indelible identity is lost in a whirlwind of mish-mashed ideas that range from one-dimensional house music to uncomfortable and self-conscious turntable cuts"

== Track listing ==
All songs by Martin Rev and Alan Vega.

1. "Televised Executions" – 6:11
2. "Misery Train" – 5:18
3. "Swearin' to the Flag" – 4:51
4. "Beggin' for Miracles" – 5:01
5. "American Mean" – 5:04
6. "Wrong Decisions" – 4:29
7. "Death Machine" – 4:16
8. "Power au Go-Go" – 4:14
9. "Dachau, Disney, Disco" – 5:18
10. "Child, It's a New World" – 4:52
11. "I Don't Know" – 5:39

== Personnel ==
Suicide

- Alan Vega – vocals
- Martin Rev – keyboards

Technical

- Perkin Barnes – engineer
- Jonathan de Villiers – photography
- Scott King – art direction, design

== See also ==
- 2002 in music
- Music of New York City

== Notes ==
=== References ===
- Nobahkt, David (2004). Suicide: No Compromise. SAF Publishing Ltd. ISBN 0946719713.
