= Live at CBGB's 1983 =

Live at CBGB's

Live album by Flipper
- Released: 1997
- Label: Overground

Flipper chronology
Nürnberg Fish Trials (1991)	Live at CBGB's (1997)	Fight (2009)

Live at CBGB's is the fourth live album by San Francisco-based punk rock band Flipper, released in 1997 by Overground, It was recorded May 14, 1983 at CBGB in New York City, is Flipper's fourth live album.

== Track list ==
1. If It Don't Fit Don't Force It
2. The Lights, the Sounds, the Rhythm, the Noise
3. Life
4. In Life My Friends
5. Ha Ha Ha
6. I Saw You Shine
7. If I Can't Be Drunk
8. Hopelessly in Love
9. Love Canal
10. Sex Bomb

== Personnel ==
- Ted Falconi – guitar
- Steve DePace – drums
- Bruce Loose – vocals, bass
- Bruno DeSmartass – vocals, bass
