= 2×4 (Einstürzende Neubauten album) =

2X4

Live album by Einstürzende Neubauten
- Released: 1984
- Recorded: 1980–1983
- Genre: Experimental music
- Length: 38:02
- Label: ROIR
- Producer: Jochem Huelder & Peter Wright (Project Coordinators)

Einstürzende Neubauten chronology
Strategies Against Architecture 80-83 (1984)	2X4 (1984)	Halber Mensch (1985)

Professional ratings
Review scores
Source	Rating
Allmusic	3/5 stars

2X4 is a collection of concert recordings by the German group Einstürzende Neubauten. ROIR released 2X4 in 1984 in cassette-only format (as was the case for all early ROIR releases). The live tracks were recorded in various European cities between 1980 and 1983. Kurt Loder wrote the liner notes. The album was re-released on CD in 1997.

The title refers to the four tracks on each side of the cassette (or possibly to dimensional lumber, which the band was likely to use as a part of its instrumentation).

== Track listing ==
No.	Title	Location and Date	Length
1.	"Fleisch Blut Haut Knochen"	Belgium 1982	3:50
2.	"Sehnsucht (Nie Mehr)"	Berlin 1983	2:27
3.	"Womb"	Hamburg 1980	5:15
4.	"Krach der Schlagenden Herzen"	Belgium 1982	7:49
5.	"Armenisch Bitter"	Berlin 1982	8:53
6.	"Zum Tier machen"	Berlin 1982	1:57
7.	"Sehnsucht (Still Stehend)"	Berlin 1982	3:00
8.	"Durstige Tiere"	Amsterdam 1982	4:51

== Personnel ==
Einstürzende Neubauten

- Blixa Bargeld
- F.M. Einheit
- N.U. Unruh
- Mark Chung
- Alexander Hacke (also known as Alexander V. Borsig)
