= Blow'n Chunks =

Live album by Flipper
- Released: 1984
- Recorded: 1983
- Label: ROIR

Flipper chronology
| Blow'n Chunks (1984) | Public Flipper Limited (1986) |

Professional ratings
Review scores
| Source | Rating |
|---|---|
| AllMusic | 4/5 stars |

Blow'n Chunks is the first live album by American punk rock band Flipper, released in 1984 by ROIR. The recordings originate from a show performed at CBGB on Thanksgiving Day of 1983.

== Track listing ==
1. Way of the World
2. The Lights, the Sound, the Rhythm, the Noise
3. Shed No Tears
4. Love Canal
5. Ha Ha Ha
6. In Your Arms
7. Life Is Cheap
8. In Life My Friend
9. Get Away
10. Life
11. Sacrifice
12. If I Can't Be Drunk
13. Ice Cold Beer

== Personnel ==
- Ted Falconi – guitar
- Steve DePace – drums
- Bruce Loose – vocals, bass
- Will Shatter – vocals, bass
