= American Grafishy =

Studio album by Flipper
- Released: 1992
- Length: 42:05
- Label: Def American
- Producer: Flipper

Flipper chronology
Gone Fishin' (1984)	American Grafishy (1992)	Love (2009)

American Grafishy is the third studio album by the San Francisco-based punk rock band Flipper. It was released in 1992 by Def American; label president Rick Rubin had once been in a Flipper tribute band. The album title is a pun on the coming-of-age film American Graffiti. The band promoted the album with a North American tour.

== Production ==
The album was produced by Flipper. The opening and closing tracks allude to former bandmember Will Shatter's death. John Dogherty replaced Shatter on bass.

== Critical reception ==
Professional ratings
Review scores
Source	Rating
AllMusic	2.5/5 stars
Chicago Tribune	3.5/4 stars
Christgau's Consumer Guide	(dud)
Collector's Guide to Heavy Metal	7/10
Entertainment Weekly	C
Spin Alternative Record Guide	3/10

Trouser Press noted that "the band’s patented approach to noise still packs a punch." The Chicago Reader deemed American Grafishy a "feeble reunion album." The Boston Globe called it "semi-hooky, appealingly tortured, snarling, gnarled punk." The Toronto Star considered it "hard, lean, exciting, vital."

The Atlanta Journal-Constitution wrote: "What was once radical now sounds rote, and if a band capable of such titanic anarchy can even bother with a career, what does it say about the rest of us number-crunchers, dishwashers and wage slaves?"

== Track listing ==
All tracks are written by Flipper.

No.	Title	Length
1.	"Someday"	4:18
2.	"Flipper Twist"	4:48
3.	"May the Truth Be Known"	2:51
4.	"We're Not Crazy"	3:11
5.	"Fucked Up Once Again"	5:31
6.	"Exist or Else"	5:18
7.	"Distant Illusion"	4:28
8.	"Telephone"	3:18
9.	"It Pays to Know"	4:50
10.	"Full Speed Ahead"	3:37
Total length:		42:05

== Personnel ==
- Bruce Loose – lead and backing vocals
- Ted Falconi – guitar, illustration
- John Dougherty – bass, backing vocals
- Steve DePace – drums, backing vocals

=== Other personnel ===
- Flipper – producer, art direction
- Rick Rubin – executive producer
- Garry Creiman – associated producer, engineering
- Barrle Goshko – art direction, design
- Tami Herrick-Needham – design
- Jay Blakesberg – photography
