= A 1000 Keys =

Studio album by Thomas Brinkmann
- Released: 30 September 2016
- Length: 75:31
- Label: Editions Mego

Thomas Brinkmann chronology
What You Hear (Is What You Hear) (2015)	A 1000 Keys (2016)	A Certain Degree of Stasis (2016)

A 1000 Keys is a studio album by German record producer Thomas Brinkmann. It was released on 30 September 2016 through Editions Mego.

== Background ==
Thomas Brinkmann is a German record producer. For A 1000 Keys, he translated the sounds of a grand piano into binary codes and sequenced them. The album consists of 18 tracks, clocking in at 75 minutes. All tracks on the album are named after three-letter codes for various international airports. The album is dedicated to composer Conlon Nancarrow. It was released on 30 September 2016 through Editions Mego.

== Critical reception ==
Professional ratings
Review scores
Source	Rating
No Ripcord	6/10
Pitchfork	6.9/10
PopMatters	5/10 stars
Resident Advisor	3.4/5

Philip Sherburne of Pitchfork commented that "There are no melodies here, just a steady, MIDI-driven pummel of chord clusters: Imagine a set of pistons suspended over the keys, striking over and over until the ivory cracks and the ebony splinters." Marc Masters of Resident Advisor stated, "As ruthless as it can be, the music is a fascinating demonstration of what repetition can do when left unattended, as if the creator has exited the room." He added, "There are some interesting variations in Brinkmann's attack, but many are so small they feel like illusions conjured by all the numbing monotony."

Juan Edgardo Rodríguez of No Ripcord wrote, "A 1000 Keys has the uncanny ability to both fascinate and infuriate those who choose to stay for the entire recording." John Garratt of PopMatters noted that "it's entirely too easy to lose focus amongst all the ramshackle rhythms and atonal figures." He added, "The Editions Mego label has long been good for a conceptually musical challenge for our senses, but A 1000 Keys proves that you can't nail it cold all the time every time." Jedd Beaudoin of Spectrum Culture stated, "it's all hopeless and monochromatic, inescapable but not in the way one hopes for."

== Track listing ==
A 1000 Keys track listing
No.	Title	Length
1.	"PSA"	3:12
2.	"LHR"	5:48
3.	"SYD"	4:36
4.	"VIE"	6:58
5.	"JFK"	5:50
6.	"KGD"	7:24
7.	"TLV"	3:26
8.	"TBS"	3:24
9.	"SFO"	0:44
10.	"MEX"	3:27
11.	"HEL"	0:44
12.	"CGN"	3:35
13.	"LAS"	8:11
14.	"YWG"	4:37
15.	"LED"	2:17
16.	"NRT"	3:59
17.	"MAD"	5:52
18.	"KIX"	1:27
Total length:		75:31

Notes

- "LHR", "YWG", and "MAD" are not included on the vinyl edition.
