= Love (Flipper album) =

Studio album by Flipper
- Released: May 19, 2009
- Recorded: 2008
- Studio: Murky Slough
- Genres: Hardcore punk, noise rock
- Length: 42:25
- Label: MVD Audio
- Producer: Jack Endino

Flipper chronology
American Grafishy (1993)	Love (2009)

Love is the fourth studio album by the San Francisco-based punk rock band Flipper, released in 2009. The album was issued more than 16 years after their previous studio album, 1993's American Grafishy. Love is the only Flipper studio album to date to include bassist Krist Novoselic. The recording sessions took place at Novoselic's studio in Washington.

Love was released simultaneously with the live album Fight, which was recorded in Portland, Oregon, and Seattle. Jack Endino recorded and produced both albums.

== Critical reception ==
Professional ratings
Review scores
Source	Rating
AllMusic	3.5/5 stars
Boston Phoenix	1.5/5 stars
Punknews.org	4.5/5 stars

The Austin Chronicle wrote: "These old dogs haven't learned any new tricks, but with Jack Endino in the producer's chair and Nirvana bassist Krist Novoselic, they manage a raucous, post-punk retread that, after the teenaged delinquency of 'Be Good, Child!' goes off like 'Sex Bomb' closing 1982's seminal Album: Generic Flipper."

== Track listing ==
All songs written by Bruce Loose, Ted Falconi, Krist Novoselic and Steve DePace.

No.	Title	Length
1.	"Be Good, Child!"	1:42
2.	"Learn to Live"	3:03
3.	"Only One Answer"	6:14
4.	"Live Real"	2:35
5.	"Triple Mass"	2:40
6.	"Love Fight"	4:50
7.	"Transparent Blame"	2:25
8.	"Why Can't You See?"	6:32
9.	"Night Falls"	3:29
10.	"Old Graves"	8:51
Total length:		42:25

== Musicians and personnel ==
Flipper

- Bruce Loose – lead vocals
- Ted Falconi – guitar
- Krist Novoselic – bass; backing vocals on "Learn to Live"
- Steve DePace – drums; backing vocals on "Learn to Live"

Production

- Jack Endino – engineering, production
