= Honky (album) =

Studio album by Melvins
- Released: May 5, 1997
- Recorded: February 12–17, 1997
- Genres: Sludge metal; experimental rock
- Length: 70:53
- Label: Amphetamine Reptile
- Producers: Melvins; Joe Barresi

Melvins chronology
Stag (1996)	Honky (1997)	Singles 1–12 (1997)

Professional ratings
Review scores
Source	Rating
AllMusic	3/5 stars
NME	1/10
Rock Hard	1/10 stars

Honky is the ninth studio album by American rock band Melvins, released on May 5, 1997, through Amphetamine Reptile Records. The album's final track, "In the Freaktose the Bugs are Dying", concludes with more than 25 minutes of silence. As of 2026, the album has not been added to streaming services.

== Vinyl version ==
A vinyl version was also released by Amphetamine Reptile Records in a limited amount. The vinyl version splits the song "Air Breather Deep in the Arms of Morphius" into two parts due to limitations of the vinyl sides. The final song "In the Freaktose the Bugs Are Dying" omits the 25 minutes of silence.

== Track listing ==
All tracks are written by Melvins.

No.	Title	Length
1.	"They All Must Be Slaughtered"	8:17
2.	"Mombius Hibachi"	1:58
3.	"Lovely Butterfly"	2:10
4.	"Pitfalls in Serving Warrants"	3:36
5.	"Air Breather Deep in the Arms of Morphius"	12:12
6.	"Laughing with Lucifer at Satan's Sideshow"	2:16
7.	"HOW --++--"	3:26
8.	"Harry Lauder's Walking Stick Tree"	3:17
9.	"Grin"	4:11
10.	"In the Freaktose the Bugs Are Dying" (4:20 without lacuna)	29:23
Total length:		70:53 (45:43 without lacuna)

== Personnel ==
Melvins

- King Buzzo – guitar, vocals
- Mark D – bass, guitar
- Dale C – drums

Additional musicians

- Katherine Bjelland – additional vocals (track 1)
- Mac Mann – piano, bell and synthesizer
- David Scott Stone – bowed cymbal and oscillators

Production

- Joe Barresi – production, engineering, mixing
- Ryan Boesch – assistance
- Mackie O – art and polaroids
