= Lysol (album) =

Studio album by Melvins
- Released: 1992
- Genres: Drone doom; noise rock; sludge metal; stoner metal
- Length: 31:21
- Label: Boner

Melvins chronology
Joe Preston (1992)	Lysol (1992)	Houdini (1993)

Lysol (also known as Melvins, Untitled and Lice-All) is the fourth studio album by the American rock band Melvins, released in 1992 via Boner Records.

The album consists of six separate tracks which were mastered and assembled as one "megacomposition". It also features covers of Flipper's "Sacrifice" (from the album Gone Fishin') and Alice Cooper's "Second Coming" and "The Ballad of Dwight Fry", both from the album Love It to Death. The album has been credited as an influence on the drone doom genre and the band Sunn O))).

== Artwork ==
The album cover is a painting based on a 1908 sculpture by Cyrus Edwin Dallin, Appeal to the Great Spirit. The image also appears on The Beach Boys in Concert, on the logo for Brother Records, and on the cover of The Time Is Near by the Keef Hartley Band.

== Title ==
Boner Records was unaware that Lysol was a registered trademark until after the first batch of record jackets and CD booklets/back cards had already been printed. Lehn & Fink, the company owning the trademark to Lysol, sent a staff member to go undercover as an interviewer for a magazine to find out information about the record, as they did not want the Lysol name on the album. Boner officially retitled the record Melvins and covered the word Lysol with black tape on the front of the jackets and booklets and with black ink on the spines. Early after the initial release, the tape and ink were easily removed, and many fans did so. Later, attempting to remove the tape would result in severe damage. Subsequent printings omitted the word Lysol entirely.

On January 20, 2015, Boner re-released the album in a double LP combo with Eggnog. The title was changed to "Lice-All", presumably to avoid legal conflict with Lysol owner Reckitt but maintain the phonetic recognition.

== Reception ==
Professional ratings
Review scores
Source	Rating
AllMusic	4.5/5 stars

AllMusic critic Ned Raggett wrote: "The logical extension of the sheer monstrosity of the band's work up to that time, with longer and longer songs, its first two parts alone are jawdroppers." Ira Robbins of Trouser Press described the record as "weird and wonderful". Robbins also further stated: "The first half is a big gulp of guitar distortion into which the rhythm section weighs in from time to time; at the twelve-minute mark, the arrival of a steady beat and vocals shape it into a bone-crushing mother of a song."

== Track listing ==
All songs written by Buzz Osborne, except where noted.

No.	Title	Writer(s)	Length
1.	"Hung Bunny"		10:42
2.	"Roman Dog Bird"		7:38
3.	"Sacrifice"	Will Shatter	6:11
4.	"Second Coming"	Alice Cooper	1:14
5.	"The Ballad of Dwight Fry"	Michael Owen Bruce, Cooper	3:11
6.	"With Teeth"		2:26

Notes

- No edition of the album gives a track listing. In the CD edition, the entire six song program is presented as one continuous and unbroken track.

== Personnel ==
- Buzz – guitar, lead vocals
- Joe – bass, backing vocals
- Dale – drums, backing vocals
