= What You Hear (Is What You Hear) =

Studio album by Thomas Brinkmann
- Released: 25 May 2015
- Genre: Experimental
- Length: 68:39
- Label: Editions Mego

Thomas Brinkmann chronology
When Horses Die (2008)	What You Hear (Is What You Hear) (2015)	A 1000 Keys (2016)

What You Hear (Is What You Hear) is a studio album by German record producer Thomas Brinkmann. It was released on 25 May 2015 through Editions Mego.

== Background ==
Thomas Brinkmann is a German record producer. What You Hear (Is What You Hear) is his first album for Peter Rehberg's record label Editions Mego. The album consists of 11 tracks, clocking in at 68 minutes. The album is dedicated to Zbigniew Karkowski. Prior to the album's release, the track "Agent Orange" was posted on Editions Mego's SoundCloud page. The album was released on 25 May 2015 through Editions Mego.

== Critical reception ==
Professional ratings
Review scores
Source	Rating
Exclaim!	7/10
Pitchfork	6.9/10
PopMatters	8/10 stars

Miles Raymer of Pitchfork stated, "What You Hear (Is What You Hear) is minimalist, but it's not techno." He added, "Ambient's not the right word for it either, because the songs are too alien-sounding to settle into the scenery. John Bush of AllMusic described the album as "an intense, quasi-rhythmic noise excursion." Bryon Hayes of Exclaim! wrote, "Each piece, if not probed and ruminated upon by the listener, will appear monolithic in nature, but through perspicacious listening, the molecular arrangement and the micro-rhythmic qualities of the music are revealed."

=== Accolades ===
Year-end lists for What You Hear (Is What You Hear)
Publication	List	Rank	Ref.
Pitchfork	The Best Experimental Albums of 2015	8	

== Track listing ==
What You Hear (Is What You Hear) track listing
No.	Title	Length
1.	"Ziegelrot"	2:38
2.	"Kadmiumgelb"	6:54
3.	"Indigoblau"	4:52
4.	"Agent Orange"	8:03
5.	"Purpurrot"	8:03
6.	"Antimongelb"	4:52
7.	"Mitisgrün"	7:06
8.	"Perinon"	6:40
9.	"Bleiweiss"	5:58
10.	"Graphit"	11:12
11.	"Oxidrot"	2:21
Total length:		68:39

== Personnel ==
Credits adapted from liner notes.

- Thomas Brinkmann
- Stephen O'Malley – design
