= Bruce Loose =

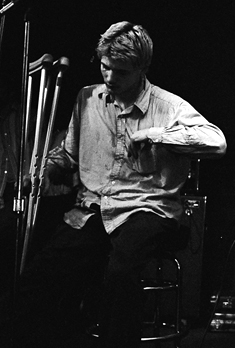
- Loose on stage with Flipper in 1984

Background information
- Also known as: Bruce Loose; Bruce Lose
- Born: Bruce Richard Calderwood; June 6, 1959; California, US
- Died: September 8, 2025 (aged 66) Humboldt County, California, US
- Genre: Punk rock
- Instruments: Vocals, bass
- Years active: 1979–1994, 2005–2015
- Formerly of: Flipper

Bruce Richard Calderwood (1956 — September 5, 2025) was an American punk singer. He was a co-lead singer and bassist for Flipper from 1979 to 2015.

== Career ==
Loose joined Flipper in 1979 after they kicked out their original lead singer, Ricky Williams. He originally sang as "Bruce Lose" before switching to "Loose" as he "he wanted to be less negative". The band was unique for having two singer/bassist, Loose and Will Shatter. When Shatter died in 1987, the band went on hiatus during which Loose was left with a broken back after a car accident in 1994.

He returned to the stage in 2002, with support from a walking cane, for a one-off gig at Berkeley's 924 Gilman Street space billed as "Not Flipper". Loose reformed Flipper with Ted Falconi and Steve DePace in 2005. Loose was "voted out" of Flipper in 2015 due to health problems and was replaced by David Yow.

== Personal life ==
He was born to Beatnik parents in California in 1956. Loose was married to poet and artist Meri St. Mary and had a child with her.

After many years of health problems, Bruce died on September 5, 2025 at his home in Humboldt County, California from a suspected heart attack aged 66. He had also suffered a stroke in June.
