= Flipper (band) =

American noise-punk band

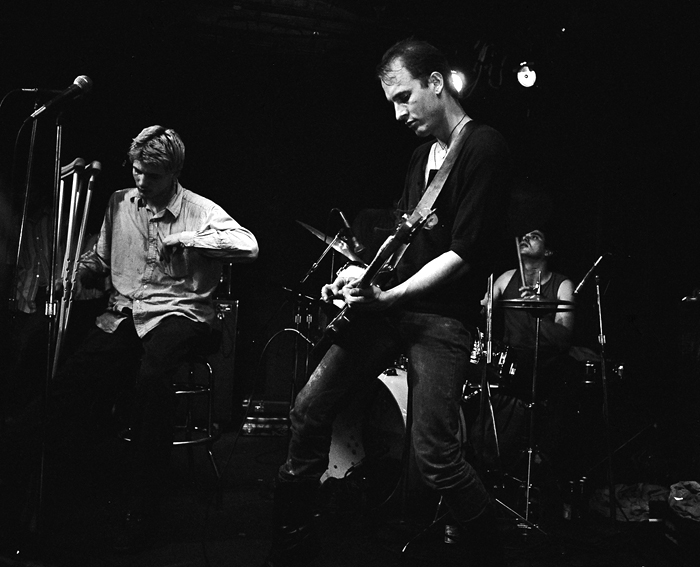
- Flipper at the 9:30 Club, Washington, D.C., 1984

Background information
- Origin: San Francisco, California, U.S.
- Genre: Noise rock • punk rock • hardcore punk
- Years active: 1979–1987, 1990–1993, 2005–present
- Labels: Subterranean, Alternative Tentacles, ROIR, American, Domino
- Members: Steve DePace; Jon Kelly; Sean Shimmer aka Sean Paul Lampon; Justin Pearson; Matt Korvett
- Past members: Will Shatter; Ricky Williams; Bruce Loose; Ted Falconi; John Dougherty; Krist Novoselic; Bruno DeSmartass; David Yow; Rachel Thoele; Mike Watt
- Website: flipperrules.com

Flipper is an American punk rock band formed in San Francisco, California in 1979. The band influenced a number of grunge, punk rock and noise rock bands. Their slowed-down, bass-driven and heavily distorted style of punk is considered to have inspired bands such as the Melvins and Nirvana, whose bass player Krist Novoselic played with the band in the 2000s.

Flipper's classic lineup, consisting of Bruce Loose (vocals, bass), Ted Falconi (guitar), Will Shatter (vocals, bass) and Steve DePace (drums), appeared on the band's first two studio albums, Album – Generic Flipper (1982) and Gone Fishin' (1984) as well as the live albums, Blow'n Chunks (1984) and Public Flipper Limited Live 1980–1985 (1986) before Shatter's death caused the band to go on hiatus in 1987. The band reunited in 1990, releasing the album American Grafishy (1993) with bassist John Dougherty before going again on hiatus.

The band reunited in 2005, and has gone through several more bassists, including Krist Novoselic who played on their fourth studio album, Love (2009). After Loose left the band in 2015, followed by Falconi in 2025, DePace remains as the sole original member.

== History ==
=== Early years (1979–1989) ===
Flipper was founded by former Sleepers member Ricky Williams (vocals), former Rad Command member Ted Falconi (guitar), and former Negative Trend members Will Shatter (bass) and Steve DePace (drums). Founding member and original vocalist Williams was credited with naming the band, but was fired before it made any recordings. Bruce “Loose” Calderwood replaced Williams and he and Shatter then went on to trade vocal and bass duties, with both bringing a bass onstage. Bruce and Shatter typically took turns, one playing bass while the other sang lead vocal. Falconi was a Vietnam War veteran, and played a uniquely distorted style of guitar.

Flipper's first recordings appeared in late 1979 on the SF Underground 7-inch EP released on the newly formed Subterranean Records, followed by the "Love Canal"/"Ha Ha Ha" 7-inch single in 1980.

"Ha Ha Ha"
Sample of the 1981 Flipper single "Ha Ha Ha." Characteristic of the band, the heavy bass and vocals primarily carry the melody. Also exemplified is Ted Falconi's unique style of distorted guitar playing.

In 1981, the "Sex Bomb"/"Brainwash" single was released, featured individually hand-made covers. The lengthy A-side had minimal lyrics ("She's a sex bomb, my baby, yeah") and gained the band notoriety within the punk community. The original lineup released their first full-length album, Album – Generic Flipper, on Subterranean in 1982. It was recorded over a year and contained a new version of "Sex Bomb". It was followed later in the year with another single on Subterranean, "Get Away"/"The Old Lady that Swallowed the Fly".

The band regularly performed in the San Francisco area and attracted a large following. Simultaneously, their uniquely slowed-down and raucous approach to punk managed to infuriate other members of the local punk scene, especially with the burgeoning popularity of faster-paced hardcore punk. Mark Arm claimed, in the 2006 documentary American Hardcore, that Flipper's charm as a band lay in their ability to upset audiences while attracting their undivided attention and curiosity at the same time. Fans began spray painting "Flipper Rules" in various locations around San Francisco and eventually the world.

In 1983, Flipper appeared in Rick Schmidt's independent film, Emerald Cities. Footage of a live performance was interspersed throughout the film, showcasing three songs: "One By One", "Get Away" and "Love Canal".

The cover of Gone Fishin' in 1984. The pictured van was where Ted Falconi lived when not on tour with the band. Photo by Vincent Anton.

A follow-up 1984 Subterranean studio album, Gone Fishin', featured the opening track "The Lights, the Sound, the Rhythm, the Noise", as well as "Survivors of the Plague" and "Sacrifice". The colorful van on the cover, along with figures representing the band and their equipment, could be cut out and folded. Subterranean also offered extra covers through a small mail order fee.

Cover of Blow'n Chunks, featuring the dead fish used as Flipper's mascot

Also in 1984, the ROIR cassette label released Blow'n Chunks, a live document of a Flipper performance at CBGB. It included material from all phases of the band's existence to that date. It was reissued on CD in 1990. A 2001 reissue included four outtakes from the live sessions.

Flipper titled their 1986 double live album Public Flipper Limited. The album unfolded into a board game with a cutout spinner and game cards, with Subterranean once again providing extra covers through mail order.

The original lineup splintered after a period of touring, and singer and core member Shatter died on December 9, 1987, of a drug overdose after forming A3I. Subterranean packaged the band's singles and rarities as the 1988 collection Sex Bomb Baby. The cassette edition and later CD re-releases featured three bonus tracks.

=== After Will Shatter (1990–1999) ===
The band resurfaced in 1990 with a new single on Subterranean, "Some Day"/"Distant Illusion", and began performing again. Nürnberg Fish Trials, another live album, was released in 1991. This lineup released an all-new studio album in 1992, American Grafishy, on Rick Rubin's Def American imprint, which was not as well-received as their previous work. Also in 1992, founding member Ricky Williams also died of a heroin overdose. After the album was released, replacement bass player John Dougherty died of a drug overdose in 1997.

Rubin also reissued Album – Generic Flipper and the singles compilation Sex Bomb Baby on his Infinite Zero label. By 1997, Flipper's music went largely out of print, with Rubin holding on to the rights. As part of a legal settlement, Subterranean was awarded the right to reissue its Flipper records on vinyl in the United States.

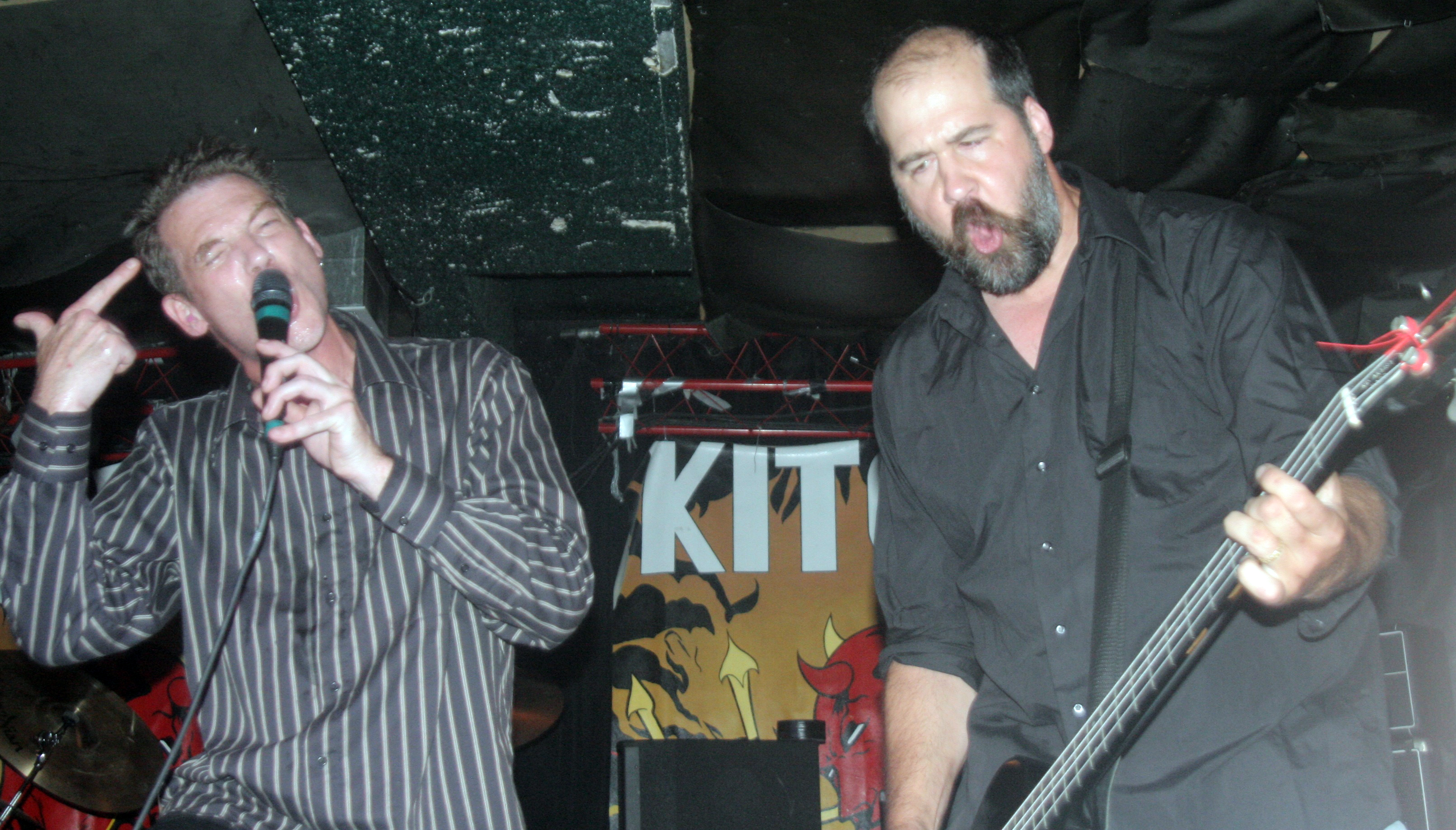
Krist Novoselic and Bruce Loose perform in the band Flipper in Seattle in 2008.

=== Reformations (2002–present) ===
In 2002, Loose (using a cane) returned for a one-off gig at Berkeley's 924 Gilman Street space as "Not Flipper". He stated that he had changed his name from Bruce Lose to Bruce Loose "because he wanted to be less negative".

The original members of Flipper, save for the late Shatter (with Bruno DeSmartass again replacing Shatter, as he had done for a 1982 tour), reunited to support CBGB on August 22 and 28, 2005. This lineup then continued to perform live beginning in 2006.

In December 2006, DeSmartass was replaced by Novoselic (ex-Nirvana) on bass for a tour of the UK and Ireland, as well as several US shows. The song "Scentless Apprentice", which the band recorded (without Novoselic) for a 2000 Nirvana tribute album, was added to the band's setlist.

Cover of 2008's Love, written and recorded with Krist Novoselic of Nirvana on bass

In 2008, the band recorded a new album with Novoselic, On May 19, 2009, Flipper released a "twin album" featuring one album, titled Love, of new studio material, and a second live album, titled Fight featuring both old and new songs. Both of these albums were produced by Seattle producer Jack Endino and were well received. Novoselic announced his departure from the band in September 2009 due to responsibilities at home, forcing a tour cancellation. He was replaced by Rachel Thoele, formerly of Frightwig, Mudwimin and Van Gough's Daughter.

Several Flipper albums were reissued during 2008–2009 in a variety of formats. Album – Generic Flipper, Gone Fishin', Public Flipper Limited and Sex Bomb Baby! were reissued on compact disc by Water Records in the US and Domino Recording Company in the UK, and on vinyl by the Runt Distribution imprint 4 Men with Beards.

Flipper played two shows at San Francisco's Bottom of the Hill on October 10 and 11, 2015, with DeSmartass returning on bass and David Yow (formerly of Scratch Acid and the Jesus Lizard) on vocals.

In 2019, Flipper decided to play some dates to celebrate the 40th anniversary of the band. The 2019 incarnation of the band consists of Steve DePace, Ted Falconi, and David Yow. With no permanent bass player, the band reached out to friends Rachel Thoele, Mike Watt (whose previous band Minutemen played with Flipper 36 years earlier), and Krist Novoselic. Their Northern California dates will be with Thoele on bass and supported by No Parents, Mike Watt & the Secondmen, and Qui. Watt will take over for Thoele when the band embarks on their European tour.

On September 5, 2025, Bruce Loose died from a heart attack at the age of 66.

== Influence on other musicians ==
Kurt Cobain wore a self-made Flipper T-shirt, seen in the booklet pictures of Nirvana's In Utero, on the band's first performance on Saturday Night Live in 1992, and also in the music video for "Come as You Are". Cobain and Novoselic cited Flipper as one of their band's influences.

In the documentary American Hardcore, Moby stated that he fronted Flipper for two days while singer Will Shatter was in jail because he "knew all of their songs". Steve DePace recalls that it was only for one night.

Eric Avery of Jane's Addiction has said that Flipper's rolling rhythms and repetitive riffs were an influence on his band's early sound.

In Get in the Van, his memoir of the early 1980s punk rock scene, Henry Rollins of Black Flag described the Flipper experience: "They were just heavy. Heavier than you. Heavier than anything...When they played they were amazing".

== Covers ==
R.E.M. covered "Sex Bomb" for the A-side of the 1994 edition of their Fan Club Singles 7-inch series.

The Melvins covered several Flipper songs: "Sacrifice" on their Lysol album; "Love Canal" and "Someday" on a 5-inch single released by Slap-A-Ham Records; and "Way of the World" on the Singles 1–12 compilation.

Belgian electronica/industrial band Lords of Acid covered Flipper's song "Sex Bomb", and released a live version on the 1995 "Do What You Wanna Do" maxi-single. The track started with Praga Khan giving credit to Flipper. It was later reinterpreted in the Lords' typical style on the 2000 album Farstucker, and is a staple of their live shows.

UK band Terminal Cheesecake also covered' "Sex Bomb" on their second album, 1989's V.C.L. (Wiiija Records).

Unsane covered the song "Ha Ha Ha" on their 2012 album Wreck.

== Band members ==
Current

- Steve DePace – drums (1979–present)
- Jon Kelly — guitar (2025-present)
- Sean Shimmer aka Sean Paul Lampon – bass (2026–present)
- Justin Pearson — vocals (2026–present)
- Matt Korvett — vocals (2026–present)

Former

- Ted Falconi – guitar (1979–2025)
- Will Shatter – vocals, bass (1979–1987; his death)
- Ricky Williams – vocals (1979; died 1992)
- Bruce Loose – vocals, bass (1979–2015; died 2025)
- Bruno DeSmartass – bass, guitar (1983, 2005–2006, 2015)
- John Dougherty – bass (1990–1993; died 1997)
- Krist Novoselic – bass (2006–2009)
- Rachel Thoele – bass (2009–2015, 2019, 2019–2022)
- David Yow – vocals (2015–2022); bass (2015–2019)
- Mike Watt – bass (2019, 2022); vocals (2022)

== Discography ==
=== Studio albums ===
Title	Year	Label
Album – Generic Flipper	1982	Subterranean Records, reissued on Water Records in 2008
Gone Fishin'	1984	Subterranean Records, reissued on Water Records in 2008
American Grafishy	1993	Def American
Love	2009	MVD Audio

=== Live albums ===
Title	Year	Label
Blow'n Chunks	1984	ROIR
Public Flipper Limited	1986	Subterranean Records, reissued on Water Records in 2008
Nürnberg Fish Trials	1991	Musical Tragedies
Live at CBGB's	1997	Overground
Fight	2009	MVD Audio

=== Singles ===
Title	Year	Label
"Love Canal"/"Ha Ha Ha"	1980	Subterranean Records
"Sex Bomb"/"Brainwash"	1981	Subterranean Records
"Get Away"/"The Old Lady that Swallowed the Fly"	1982	Subterranean Records
"Some Day"/"Distant Illusion"	1990	Subterranean Records
"Flipper Twist"/"Fucked Up"	1992	Matador Records/Def American
"Sex Bomb Remix-Falconi's Horn Concerto In D-Fault (Live)" (Second recording is on the same track. Sides A and B are the same)	1993	Fear and Loathing
Generic Single: "Sex Bomb"/"Sex Bomb (Single Version)"/"Brainwash"	2009	Domino
"Hot Fish (with The Melvins)"/"Sacrifice (with The Melvins)" (Side A of split single with The Melvins)	2019	Amphetamine Reptile Records
"Love Canal (with David Yow)"	2019	Joyful Noise Records

=== Compilations ===
Title	Year	Label
Sex Bomb Baby	1988	Subterranean Records, reissued on Infinite Zero Archive/American Recordings in 1995, reissued on Water Records in 2008
Not A Flipper Tape (Limited Cassette Release)	1988	Cao Din Records
Problem Child	2020	Cleopatra Records
Flipper's Greatest Misses	Unreleased	None

=== Videos ===
Title	Year	Label
Flipper Tape/Caught Live!/Flipper Live:1983	1983	Ace Video/RIA/Dog Patch
Flipper Live	February 19, 2008	Music Video Distributors

=== Other appearances ===
Title	Year	Album
"Earthworm"	1979	SF Underground
"Falling", "Lowrider" and "End the Game"	1981	Live at Target
"Ha Ha Ha"	1981	Let Them Eat Jellybeans!
"Sacrifice"	1982	Not So Quiet on the Western Front
"Life"	1982	Rat Music for Rat People
"Ever"	1983	Eastern Front
"Ever" and "Sex Bomb"	1992	The Wanna-Be-an-Indie-But-Got-Too-Much-$ Sampler
"Some Day"	1993	SXSW
"Love Canal" and "Get Away"	1994	Infinite Zero Promotional CD#2
"Ha Ha Ha"	1995	Old School Punk
"Scentless Apprentice" (Nirvana cover)	2000	Smells Like Bleach: A Punk Tribute to Nirvana
"Sad But True"	2001	A Punk Tribute to Metallica
"Problem Child" (AC/DC cover)	2002	For Those About to Rawk: A Punk Tribute to AC/DC
"Ha Ha Ha"	2006	American Hardcore's Official Movie Soundtrack
"Hash Pipe" (Weezer cover)	2006	A Punk Tribute to Weezer
