= Singles 1–12 =

Compilation album by Melvins
- Released: August 26, 1997
- Recorded: 1983–1997
- Genre: Sludge metal
- Length: 93:06
- Label: Amphetamine Reptile
- Producer: Various

Melvins chronology
Honky (1997)	Singles 1–12 (1997)	Alive at the Fucker Club (1998)

Singles from Singles 1–12
- 1. "Lexicon Devil" / "Pigtro" Released: January 1996; 2. "In the Rain" / "Spread Eagle" Released: February 1996; 3. "Leech" / "Queen" Released: March 1996; 4. "Way of the World" / "Theme" Released: April 1996; 5. "It's Shoved" / "Forgotten Principles" Released: May 1996; 6. "GGIIBBYY" / "Theresa Screams" Released: June 1996; 7. "Poison" / "Double Troubled" Released: July 1996; 8. "Specimen" / "All at Once" Released: August 1996; 9. "Jacksonville" / "Dallas" Released: September 1996; 10. ""The Bloat" / "Fast Forward"" Released: October 1996; 11. ""Nasty Dogs and Funky Kings" / "HDYF"" Released: November 1996; 12. ""How-++="/"Harry Lauders Walking Stick Tree" / "Zodiac" Released: December 1996

Professional ratings
Review scores
Source	Rating
AllMusic	2.5/5 stars

Singles 1–12 is a compilation album by Melvins which was released in 1997 through Amphetamine Reptile Records. In 1996, The Melvins had released a 7 inch single each month on Amphetamine Reptile Records, each limited to 800 copies worldwide. This 1997 compilation contains all of these singles.

In January, Melvins played a series of three shows at Club Spaceland. A special handmade digipak edition of album was sold here, limited to 50 copies.

== Track listing ==
=== Disc one ===
by The Melvins except where noted. (Song descriptions from CD liner notes)

No.	Title	Writer(s)	Length
1.	"Lexicon Devil" (Recorded 1993. A Germs Cover)	Germs	1:42
2.	"Pigtro" (Recorded 1995. A special mix for A&R guy at Atlantic)		3:54
3.	"In the Rain" (Recorded 1995. The Birth of Brit Pop... shit pop)		1:30
4.	"Spread Eagle" (Recorded 1993. A special mix for our A&R guy)		4:18
5.	"Leech" (Recorded live to two track. 1994 in memory of "Bing")	Mark Arm, Steve Turner	3:09
6.	"Queen" (Recorded 1994. Special mix for A&R guy)		3:13
7.	"Way of the World" (A Flipper cover. Recorded on Chinese new year)	Flipper	3:58
8.	"Theme" (A Clown Alley cover recorded in Sweden on our first euro tour)	Clown Alley	3:19
9.	"It's Shoved" (We think it's live, but it might be a rehearsal/keg party)		3:16
10.	"Forgotten Principles" (Recorded 1983 with original line up of Matt Lukin and Mike Dillard)		1:09
11.	"GGIIBBYY" (A bad song we chopped off the Houdini record)		3:09
12.	"Theresa Screams" (Hands down our all time favorite Melvins song)		4:13

=== disc two ===
No.	Title	Writer(s)	Length
1.	"Poison" (Our mix of the Wayne Kramer original.)	Wayne Kramer	3:33
2.	"Double Troubled" (A weird mish mash recorded ?????)		5:15
3.	"Specimen" (Recorded for Stag at the last minute)		6:45
4.	"All at Once" (Nuff said)		3:28
5.	"Jacksonville" (1994 with L7. Our favorite gig of the tour)		7:36
6.	"Dallas" (1995 with NIN. Our favorite gig of the tour.)		6:14
7.	"The Bloat" (Demo for Stag sessions)		3:15
8.	"Fast Forward" (Buzz & Dale playing with a cassette recorder)		4:03
9.	"Nasty Dogs & Funky Kings" (Teen age attempts at arena level rock)	Frank Beard, Billy Gibbons, Dusty Hill	2:34
10.	"HDYF" (Recorded in 1996 with IMA of Yoko Ono fame)	Yoko Ono, Sean Lennon	6:28
11.	"How-++-Harry Lauders Walking Stick Tree" (A rare blend of 2 classics)		3:29
12.	"Zodiac" (performed by Brutal Truth)		3:36

== Personnel ==
- Buzz Osborne – guitar, vocals, misc.
- Dale Crover – drums, vocals, misc.
- Mark Deutrom – bass, vocals, misc.

=== Additional personnel ===
- Lori Black – bass (disc 1, tracks 7–8)
- Matt Lukin – bass (disc 1, track 10)
- Mike Dillard – drums (disc 1, track 10)
- Wayne Kramer – guitar, vocals (disc 2, track 1)
- Sean Lennon (disc 2, track 10)
- Timo Ellis (disc 2, track 10)
- Sam Koppelman (disc 2, track 10)
- Rich Hoak – drums (disc 2, track 12)
- Dan Lilker – bass (disc 2, track 12)
- Brent McCarty – guitar (disc 2, track 12)
- Kevin Sharp – vocals (disc 2, track 12)
