= Suicide: Alan Vega and Martin Rev =

Studio album by Suicide
- Released: May 1980
- Recorded: January 1980
- Studio: Power Station, New York City
- Length: 40:33
- Label: ZE
- Producer: Ric Ocasek

Suicide chronology
21½ Minutes in Berlin/23 Minutes in Brussels (1978)	Suicide: Alan Vega and Martin Rev (1980)	Half Alive (1981)

CD reissue cover

Suicide: Alan Vega and Martin Rev is the second studio album by the American band Suicide. It was produced by Ric Ocasek of the Cars for ZE Records in 1980. Recorded in January 1980, Ocasek gave keyboardist Martin Rev new equipment to perform on while Alan Vega distanced himself from the music to concentrate on the vocals. Michael Zilkha of ZE pushed to give the album a more dance music oriented sound, hoping that disco musician Giorgio Moroder would produce it.

The album was released in May 1980 and listed as one of the best albums of the year by the NME. Alan Vega felt that "nothing big for [the group] happened" after its initial release. Both Vega and Rev issued solo albums following its release.

== Production ==
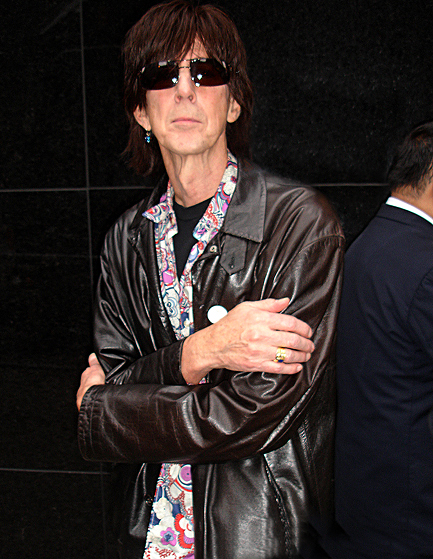
Cars vocalist Ric Ocasek produced the album for no pay.

After a tour opening for the group the Cars, Alan Vega received a call from Michael Zilkha of Ze Records asking if he could sign Suicide to his label. Zilkha gave producer Ric Ocasek a copy of Donna Summer's "I Feel Love" single stating that that song is what Suicide should sound like. Suicide: Alan Vega and Martin Rev was produced without pay by Ocasek at the Power Station studios. Power Station was a very expensive studio at that time and was used by acts such as Chic and Bruce Springsteen. The album was recorded in January 1980. Ocasek had provided the group with new equipment when in the studio, many of which keyboardist Martin Rev had not played before production had started. Bruce Springsteen was recording an album next door to Suicide and visited them during the production of the album.

Alan Vega was less involved with this album musically in comparison to Suicide's previous album, stating that the music was more of a collaboration between Ocasek and Rev while Vega "concentrated on the vocals". The songs "Harlem" and "Touch Me" had already been written and performed by the duo before recording started.

== Style ==
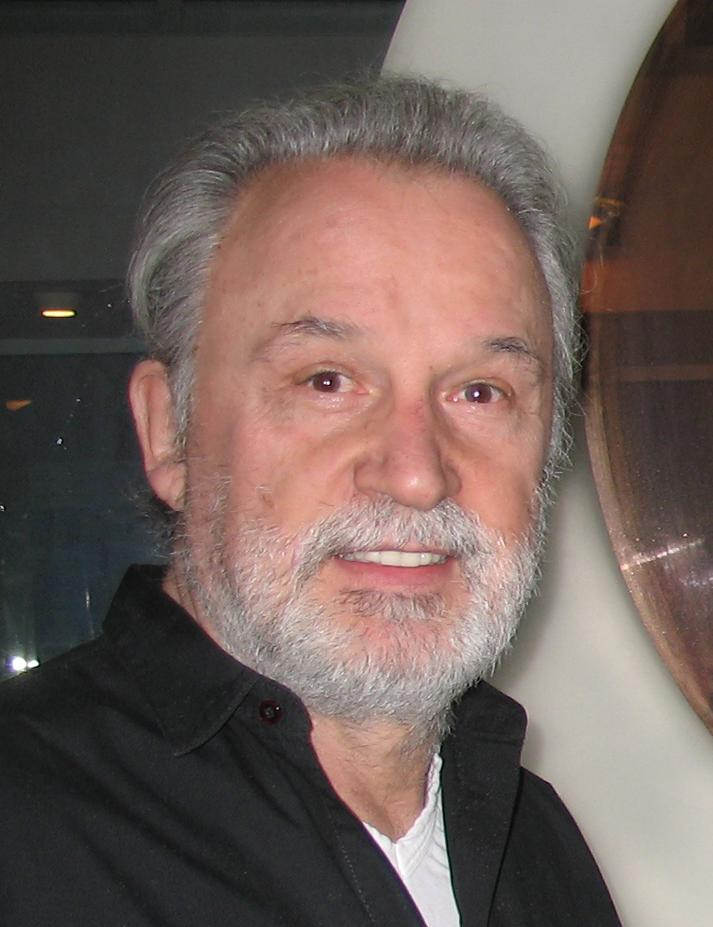
Michael Zilkha of Ze Records initially wanted Giorgio Moroder (pictured) to produce the album.

Zilkha originally hoped to get Giorgio Moroder to produce the album and have it be more dance oriented. AllMusic critic Andy Kellman described the sound of Suicide: Alan Vega and Martin Rev as "less confrontational and more contemporary" than the duo's previous album. Martin Rev stated that the lyrics of "Diamonds, Fur Coat, Champagne" were about the "decadent side of the nightlife scene". Rev later felt that the album did not reflect what the group was about.

Rev described the album cover as having a disco music style. Rev felt that Zilkha was moving Ze Records into a dance music style and tried to tone down the amount of blood and gore on the album cover as much as possible.

== Release ==
Prior to the album's release, Suicide released a non-album single titled "Dream Baby Dream" in November 1979. The album was released in May 1980 under the title Suicide: Alan Vega and Martin Rev. Alan Vega stated that there were problems with the distribution of the album.

The album was re-issued by Mute Records on compact disc on January 18, 2000. The release was titled The Second Album and featured three extra songs: "Super Subway Comedian", "Dream Baby Dream", and "Radiation". The second disc consisted of live material recorded in New York City at the Museum for Living Artists in 1975.

== Reception ==
Professional ratings
Review scores
Source	Rating
AllMusic	4.5/5 stars
Pitchfork	8.7/10
Q	4/5 stars
The Rolling Stone Album Guide	3/5 stars
Select	5/5
Spin Alternative Record Guide	9/10

At the end of 1980, Suicide: Alan Vega and Martin Rev was listed as one of the year's best albums by the NME. In his retrospective review for AllMusic, Andy Kellman said of the album: "Perhaps it's not as renegade as Suicide, but it's an arguably better, more realized work, and just as essential". Select's Ian Johnston, reviewing the Blast First re-issue, said that the album was "unjustly less celebrated" and sounded "remarkably like contemporary electronica", referring to it as "a timeless recording".

British music magazine Fact placed the record at number 79 on their list of the 100 best albums of the 1980s, referring to it as an "astonishing album, which simply refuses to age".

== Legacy ==
Alan Vega felt that "nothing big for us happened" after the second album was released in comparison to the first album. Suicide: Alan Vega and Martin Rev was a big influence on electronic music in the United Kingdom. Bobby Gillespie of Primal Scream said he "loved the album right from the start", feeling that it predated house music. Steven Severin of Siouxsie and the Banshees stated that "everything about [the album] is perfect... it would be up there with my top ten favourite albums. It's that good."

== Track listing ==
All songs written by Martin Rev and Alan Vega.

=== Side one ===
1. "Diamonds, Fur Coat, Champagne" – 3:21
2. "Mr. Ray (to Howard T.)" – 5:14
3. "Sweetheart" – 3:37
4. "Fast Money Music" – 3:08
5. "Touch Me" – 4:24

=== Side two ===
1. "Harlem" – 6:38
2. "Be Bop Kid" – 2:13
3. "Las Vegas Man" – 4:10
4. "Shadazz" – 4:25
5. "Dance" – 3:23

=== Reissue bonus tracks ===
11. "Super Subway Comedian" – 4:59
12. "Dream Baby Dream" – 6:24
13. "Radiation" – 3:07

=== Bonus disc ===
1. "Speedqueen" – 1:24
2. "Creature Feature" – 3:37
3. "Tough Guy" – 2:50
4. "A-Man" – 2:53
5. "Sneakin' Around" – 2:44
6. "Too Fine for You" – 2:06
7. "See You Around" – 4:22
8. "Be My Dream" – 4:13
9. "Space Blue Bambo" – 3:27
10. "Spaceship" – 2:42
11. "Into My Eyes" – 5:15
12. "C'Mon Babe" – 3:15
13. "New City" – 2:41
14. "Do It Nice" – 5:24

== Personnel ==
Suicide

- Alan Vega – vocals
- Martin Rev – electronics

Technical

- Ric Ocasek – producer
- Larry Alexander – engineer
- Tony Wright – cover art

== See also ==
- 1980 in music
- Music of New York City
