= Dream Baby Dream =

1979 single by Suicide

Single by Suicide
- B-side: "Radiation"
- Released: 1979
- Recorded: Right Track Recording, NY
- Genre: Synth-punk
- Length: 3:17 (7"); 6:19 (12")
- Label: Island
- Songwriters: Martin Reverby; Boruch Bermowitz
- Producer: Ric Ocasek

Suicide singles chronology
"Cheree" (1978)	"Dream Baby Dream" (1979)	"Surrender" (1988)

"Dream Baby Dream"

Single by Bruce Springsteen

from the album High Hopes
- Released: 2008 (live), 2014 (studio)
- Genre: Rock; soul
- Length: 6:19 (live) 5:03 (studio)
- Label: Columbia Records
- Songwriters: Martin Reverby; Boruch Bermowitz

Bruce Springsteen singles chronology
"Girls in Their Summer Clothes" (2008)	"Dream Baby Dream" (2008)	"Working on a Dream" (2008)

Music video
- Dream Baby Dream on Youtube.com

"Dream Baby Dream" is a song by the electro-punk band Suicide, written by its members Martin Rev and Alan Vega. It was released as a single in 1979 by Island Records.

It has been covered by Neneh Cherry and The Thing on the 2011-recorded album The Cherry Thing and by Bruce Springsteen both live and in a studio version released on High Hopes (2014). Springsteen released a live version as an EP which was a part of the Alan Vega 70th Birthday Limited Edition EP Series in 2008.

Also part of the EP series was a live version of "Dream Baby Dream" performed by Suicide on NBC's The Midnight Special in 1978.

== Personnel ==
Adapted from the Dream Baby Dream liner notes.

Suicide

- Martin Rev – keyboards
- Alan Vega – vocals

Production and additional personnel
- Ric Ocasek – production
- Jay Burnett – engineering

== In popular culture ==
The song appeared in Adam Curtis' 2016 BBC documentary HyperNormalisation during a montage featuring skyscrapers being blown up. It also appeared in the 2016 film American Honey, directed by Andrea Arnold.

The song features on the closing credits of Alex Garland's Civil War (2024).

A live cover version of the song by the band Savages also appears in the 2014 film Electric Slide.

== Accolades ==
Year	Publication	Country	Accolade	Rank
1985	Sounds	United Kingdom	The 100 Best Singles of All Time	76
2001	Uncut	United Kingdom	The 100 Greatest Singles from the Post-Punk Era	42
2003	Q	United Kingdom	The 1001 Best Songs Ever	901
2008	Pitchfork	United States	The Pitchfork 500: 1977–1979	*
2016	Pitchfork	United States	The 200 Best Songs of the 1970s	37

(*) designates unordered lists.

== Formats and track listing ==
All songs written by Martin Rev and Alan Vega

UK 7" single (WIP 6543)

1. "Dream Baby Dream" – 3:17
2. "Radiation" – 3:05

== Release history ==
Region	Date	Label	Format	Catalog
United Kingdom	1979	Island	LP	WIP 6543
France	1981	Celluloid, ZE	LP	CEL 6590
