= Neil Cooper (record executive) =

- Born: 1930; Philadelphia, US
- Died: August 13, 2001; New York City, US
- Occupations: Record producer, label executive
- Years active: 1979–2001
- Known for: ROIR Records

Neil Cooper (1930–2001) was the founder and head of independent US cassette and record label ROIR.

== Biography ==
=== Early years ===
Born in Philadelphia, Cooper attended Amherst College and graduated from Columbia Business School in 1954. Working as a booking agent for MCA Inc. and Famous Artists in the 1950s, "he wheeled and dealed for everyone from Guy Lombardo to Tito Puente." Artists represented by Cooper included Shirley Bassey and Charles Mingus. While managing the bassist-composer, Neil Cooper got Mingus a job writing a score for a surreal short film about a motorboat. Cooper’s career includes a stint at the Royal Mint of the United Kingdom, where he had business meetings with Emperor Haile Selassie I of Ethiopia. This association would serve Cooper well in 1982, when he got Rastafarian hardcore punk band Bad Brains to sign a contract with him by giving them medallions minted for Emperor Selassie.

In the mid-1970s, Cooper invested in a restaurant in Hollywood Beach, Florida. It was unsuccessful until it was turned into a rock club called Tight Squeeze. Subsequently, he took over The ’80s, a live venue on Manhattan’s Upper East Side. It was during this time that Cooper decided to become a record mogul: "These guys who ran small record labels would come to The ’80s with beautiful women on their arms and order champagne, and I’d be running around trying to fix an overflowing toilet."

=== Record executive ===
Cooper approached acts playing The ’80s about signing recording contracts with him, but found most of them looking for deals beyond his means. "I wanted to put out [vinyl] LPs, but nobody wanted to make a record with me because I had no history in the [record] business. All these bands I was booking – James Chance, Lydia Lunch, Johnny Thunders, Suicide, Bush Tetras, Fleshtones, Dictators, Bad Brains – were getting popular because of the New York scene, and all wanted to sign with major record companies and get advances and tour support. But English artists like David Bowie and Bow Wow Wow and Elvis Costello were coming out with cassettes – and getting big play in [British music paper] NME. So I was able to get works in progress, or stuff that they didn’t think was good enough for an LP and a major label commitment. I gave them advances, and they gave me the rights to put out music on cassettes." Live recordings became another specialty. Neil Cooper, microphone in hand, mobile tape recorder at the ready, "the oldest hipster on the scene at nearly 50" became a familiar and much beloved sight at the concerts of New York’s finest underground bands.

Cooper founded Reachout International Records (ROIR) in 1979 as a cassette-only label. After his first releases – James Chance & The Contortions’ "Live In New York", 8-Eyed Spy’s "Live With Lydia Lunch", Shöx Lumania's "Live at the Peppermint Lounge", The Dictators’ "Fuck 'Em If They Can’t Take A Joke", and Suicide’s "Half Alive" – Sony launched the Walkman, an innovation which made the cassette the most popular musical medium of the 1980s. "Sony saved me," Cooper told journalist John Milward of The Philadelphia Inquirer in 1990. "Had the Walkman not happened, we would have probably never turned a profit." Cooper set up ROIR with an initial investment of about $60,000, which he retrieved within about six years. Cooper’s most successful signing was the hardcore punk band Bad Brains. Their self-titled 1982 debut sold 150,000 copies in 10 years, 60,000 of which on cassette. Neil Cooper released a total of 106 cassette titles that document his wide-ranging taste in music. Artists published by Cooper include the New York Dolls, Lee "Scratch" Perry, the Durutti Column, Glenn Branca, Beastie Boys, and Oku Onuora. Cooper started transferring ROIR’s cassette releases to CD in 1995, but to this day, ROIR are offering one-off cassettes.

Cooper took great pride in ROIR’s status as an independent label. Having his records distributed to retailers by around 25 small suppliers instead of dealing with one large distributor was part of this, as he told Billboard Magazine’s Jim Bessman in 1999: "We’re one of the few remaining totally indie labels in the U.S. Not that that’s a tremendous advantage, but I go to distributors you don’t know exist: young guys in their 20s, lean and mean, like Revolver, Get Hip and Surefire, and the regulars like Select-O-Hits, Dutch East India, and Action. So we’re totally independent – which is almost impossible. We have no outside income other than what we beg, borrow or steal."

=== Death ===
Neil Cooper died at his home in Manhattan on August 13, 2001. He was survived by his wife, art gallery owner Paula Cooper and his sons Lucas and Nick who took over management of ROIR.

== See also ==
- List of artists that appear on ROIR
