= Album – Generic Flipper =

Studio album by Flipper
- Released: April 1982
- Recorded: October 31, 1980 – Aug 1981
- Genres: Noise rock; punk rock; post punk
- Length: 40:15
- Label: Subterranean
- Producers: Flipper and Chris

Flipper chronology
Album – Generic Flipper (1982)	Gone Fishin' (1984)

Album – Generic Flipper is the debut studio album by the noise rock band Flipper. It was released in April 1982 through Subterranean Records. It is also referred to as Album, Album: Generic, Generic Flipper and just Generic. The album, a noise rock, punk rock, and post-punk record, was recorded from October 31, 1980, to August 1981, and was produced by the band themselves, alongside Chris.

Upon its release, the album was positively received by music critics, and charted at number 27 on the UK Indie Albums Chart. It was issued on CD for the first time by American Recordings (formerly Def American) in 1992 and later deleted. In 2008, the rights reverted to Flipper, and the album was reissued on December 9, 2008, by Water Records. Former Nirvana bassist Krist Novoselic, who joined Flipper in 2006, contributed liner notes to the new reissue.

== Critical reception ==
Professional ratings
Review scores
Source	Rating
AllMusic	4.5/5 stars
The Encyclopedia of Popular Music	4/5 stars
MusicHound Rock	5/5 stars
Ox-Fanzine	5/5 stars
Pitchfork	8.8/10
Record Collector	4/5 stars
Select	4/5
Spin Alternative Record Guide	10/10
Tom Hull - on the Web	A−
The Village Voice	A

Robert Christgau praised the album, describing the music as "crude ("Everybody start at the same time, ready"), unremitting ("Sex Bomb" has seven words and lasts close to eight minutes), and immensely charitable and good-humored (Iggy with Jerry's soul, I'm not kidding)." He described the lyrics as "existential resignation at its most enthusiastic." "If great rock & roll is supposed to be about breaking the rules," wrote Mark Deming of AllMusic, "then Flipper's still-astonishing debut, Album -- Generic Flipper, confirms their status as one of the great rock bands of their day." He described the "brilliant" "Sex Bomb" as "the closest thing '80s punk ever created to the beer-fueled genius of the Kingsmen's "Louie Louie," and a song with a great beat that you just can't dance to." He also noted that despite their "sincere" misanthropy and cynicism, " on "Life" they dared to express a tres-unhip benevolence, declaring "Life is the only thing worth living for." He concludes by writing that the band "plays noise rock with none of the pretension that later bands brought to the form, proving that music doesn't have to be fast to be punk (a lesson that gave the Melvins a reason to live), and creating a funny, harrowing, and surprisingly engaging masterwork that profoundly influenced dozens of later bands without sounding any less individual two decades later."

Another reviewer described the band's performance on the album as "[d]rawing upon the same brand of frustrated nihilism one associates with such SoCal contemporaries as Fear and the Germs" and argues that "Flipper broods where their peers seethe, slowing tempos and moaning rather than spitting their despairing lyrics." Elsewhere, in Noel Gardner's review for NME, he described the band as one "who made a punishing virtue out of being sloppy, offbeat and imprecise. Flipper existed at the epicentre of the Californian punk scene in the early ’80s, but as their hardcore peers sped up, they slowed down. A simple concept that helped to create a remarkable, incomparable signature sound, one which trickled down into the musical visions of, most famously, Black Flag and Nirvana." He calls the album "their definitive statement [...] Lyrically a bipolar flip between ugly negativity and lightbulb-moment optimism (“Life is the only thing worth living for!”), musically, Generic turns almost unrelated layers of free expression into a blackened mass of enduring power."

=== Accolades ===
It was ranked 12th in The Village Voice's annual Pazz & Jop poll. In November 2007, Blender ranked it No. 86 on their list of the 100 greatest "indie rock" albums of all time. In 1995, Spin ranked it 79th on their list "100 Alternative Albums". In March 2004, Mojo included it on their list "Lost Albums You Must Own". Rolling Stone ranked it 26th on their list "40 Greatest Punk Albums of All Time" in 2016. In 2018, Pitchfork included it at no. 193 on "The 200 Best Albums of the 1980s". Buzz Osborne of Melvins has said "This would be in my top five albums of all time." Donita Sparks of L7 listed it as one of her favorite grunge albums. Kurt Cobain listed it in his top 50 albums of all time.

== Legacy ==
Melvins covered "Way of the World", appearing on their collection Singles 1–12. Unto Ashes covered "Way of the World" on their 2005 album Grave Blessings. R.E.M. covered "Sex Bomb" on their 1994 fan club Christmas single. L7 has covered the song by mashing it with "Sweet Leaf" by Black Sabbath, calling the resulting song "Sweet Sex." Astral Jets, featuring Dez Cadena and Paul Roessler, recorded "Way of the World" on their debut album First Thought.

== Track listing ==
Side 1
No.	Title	Length
1.	"Ever"	2:56
2.	"Life Is Cheap"	3:55
3.	"Shed No Tears"	4:26
4.	"(I Saw You) Shine"	8:31

Side 2
No.	Title	Length
5.	"Way of the World"	4:23
6.	"Life"	4:44
7.	"Nothing"	2:18
8.	"Living for the Depression"	1:23
9.	"Sex Bomb"	7:48

== Personnel ==
- Will Shatter – bass (1, 2, 5, 7, 8), lead vocals (3, 4, 6, 9), backup vocals (8)
- Bruce Loose – bass (3, 4, 6, 9), lead vocals (1, 2, 5, 7, 8), backup vocals (6), special effects and bass feedback (7)
- Ted Falconi – guitars
- Steve DePace – drums, Synare (4, 9), tympani and extra percussion (7)
- Flipper – hand clapping (1), percussion (7)

Additional personnel

- Bobby – saxophone (9)
- Ward – saxophone (9)
- Curtis – percussion (7)
- Die Ant – percussion (7)
- Johnnie – percussion (7)
- "others" – percussion (7)

Production

- Chris: Producer
- Flipper: Producer
- Garry Creiman: Engineer

== Charts ==
Chart (1982)	Peak position
UK Indie Chart	27
