= Gone Fishin' (Flipper album) =

Studio album by Flipper
- Released: 1984
- Recorded: 1984
- Studio: Hyde Street
- Genres: Noise rock, post-punk, art punk, experimental rock
- Length: 37:32
- Labels: Subterranean (US original release); Water (2008 US CD reissue); 4 Men with Beards (2009 US LP reissue); Fundamental (UK original release); Domino (2009 UK reissue)
- Producer: Flipper

Flipper chronology
Album Generic Flipper (1982)	Gone Fishin' (1984)	American Grafishy (1993)

Gone Fishin' is the second studio album by San Francisco-based punk rock band Flipper, released in 1984 by Subterranean Records. The album's artwork featured a depiction of Flipper's tour van as a ready-to-cut-out-and-assemble centerpiece, with similar cutouts of the four band members on the back cover. At the time of the album's release, Subterranean offered extra empty covers of the album by mail order for $2 for those Flipper fans that wanted to have a cover to cut up and assemble. The album was reissued by Water Records on December 9, 2008, for the first time on CD, with liner notes provided by Buzz Osborne of the Melvins.

== Critical reception ==
Professional ratings
Review scores
Source	Rating
AllMusic	3/5 stars
Robert Christgau	B
The Encyclopedia of Popular Music	3/5 stars
The Rolling Stone Album Guide	4/5 stars
Spin Alternative Record Guide	6/10

Trouser Press wrote that "if you want to understand [Flipper's] creative mind, Gone Fishin’ is the ideal synthesis of sickness and health." The Rough Guide to Rock opined that "only The Stooges' Funhouse comes close to the demented wonder of this record." Spin wrote, "Crawling guitar drones and tuneless, barely tonal ramblings. A semi-anaesthetized tortoise could play faster than these four San Francisco snivellers, who tackle boredom and the meaning of life."

Melvins would later cover the fifth track on the record, "Sacrifice", for their fourth studio album Lysol.

== Track listing ==
- All songs published by Insect Music, BMI

No.	Title	Writer(s)	Length
1.	"The Light, the Sound, the Rhythm, the Noise"	Loose, Shatter	3:43
2.	"First the Heart"	Depace, Loose, Wilkinson	5:22
3.	"In Life My Friends"	Falconi, Harris	4:22
4.	"Survivors of the Plague"	Loose, Shatter	5:17
5.	"Sacrifice"	Shatter	4:26
6.	"Talk's Cheap"	Loose, Shatter	2:32
7.	"You Nought Me"	Loose, Shatter	5:02
8.	"One by One"	Falconi, Shatter	6:30

== Personnel ==
- Bruce Loose – vocals (1, 3, 5, 7, 8), bass (2, 4, 6), clavinet (1), congas (4), backing vocals (4)
- Will Shatter – vocals (2, 4, 6), bass (1, 3, 5, 7, 8)
- Ted Falconi – guitars
- Steve DePace – drums, congas (4, 8), synare (7), piano (7)
- Kirk "Charles" Heydt – alto saxophone (2)
