= ROIR =

Record label

Reachout International Records
- Founded: 1979
- Founder: Neil Cooper
- Genre: Punk rock, reggae
- Country of origin: United States
- Location: New York City

ROIR (pronounced "roar"), or Reachout International Records, is a New York City-based independent record label founded in 1979 by Neil Cooper.

== Background ==
ROIR was founded the same year that the Sony Walkman launched, and initially, the label exclusively distributed its releases in cassette format. Much of the label's catalog is now available in CD and LP formats.

ROIR released its first cassette, by James Chance and the Contortions, in 1981. In 1982, ROIR released the compilation album New York Thrash, documenting the hardcore punk scene in the New York metropolitan area.

Most of ROIR's early catalog consists of punk rock and no wave releases by artists such as Suicide, Glenn Branca, and Lydia Lunch. The label later branched out into other genres, including hardcore punk, reggae, ska, psychedelia and dub.

ROIR released early recordings by Bad Brains (Bad Brains), Beastie Boys, Einstürzende Neubauten (2X4), Flipper (Blow'n Chunks), MC5, GG Allin, New York Dolls, Suns of Arqa, Prince Far I, Television, The Legendary Pink Dots, Lee 'Scratch' Perry, The Stimulators, and The Skatalites (Stretching Out).

== See also ==
- List of record labels
- List of artists that appear on ROIR
