= Suicide (band) =

American musical duo (1970–2016)

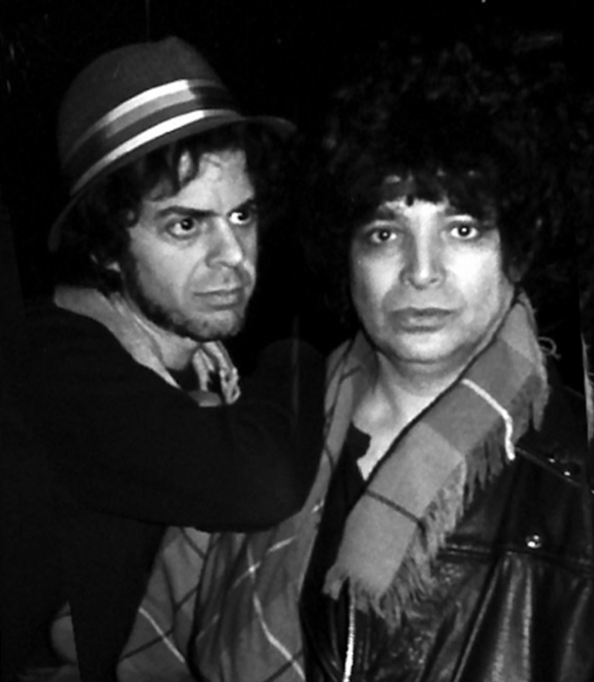
- Martin Rev and Alan Vega in 1988

Background information
- Origin: New York City, New York, U.S.
- Genres: Synth-punk; electronic; art punk; avant-garde; electronic rock; proto-punk
- Years active: 1970–2016
- Labels: Red Star, ZE, ROIR, Blast First/Mute
- Past members: Alan Vega; Martin Rev; Paul Liebegott; Mari Reverby

Suicide was an American musical duo composed of vocalist Alan Vega and instrumentalist Martin Rev, intermittently active between 1970 and 2016. The group's pioneering music fused stream-of-conscious, rockabilly-inspired vocals with minimalist electronic instrumentation, including synthesizers and primitive drum machines, and their early performances were confrontational and often ended in violence. They were among the first acts to use the phrase "punk music" in an advertisement for a concert in 1970, during its very brief stint as a three-piece including Paul Liebegott.

Though never widely popular among the general public, Suicide has been recognized as among the most influential acts of its era. The band’s debut album, Suicide (1977), was described by Entertainment Weekly as "a landmark of electronic music", while AllMusic stated that it "provided the blueprints for post-punk, synth pop, and industrial rock."

== History ==
In 1969, Alan Bermowitz became involved with the publicly funded MUSEUM: A Project of Living Artists—an artist-run 24-hour multimedia gallery at 729 Broadway in Manhattan. Producing visual art under the name Alan Suicide, Bermowitz graduated from painting to light sculptures, (Note: "I started as a painter. The first time I did a light piece was when I was working on a very big purple painting. There was one light bulb in the room and as I walked around I noticed how the painting acquired different aspects. I wanted it to be one color so I said, "Fuck this, man!" I took the light out of the ceiling and really stuck it on the painting." Alan Vega, 1993 – 100,000 Watts of Fat City Anna Polerica.) many of which were constructed from electronic debris. He gained a residency at the OK Harris Gallery in SoHo, where he continued to exhibit until 1975. Barbara Gladstone continued to show his work well into the 1980s.

Later that year, Bermowitz saw the Stooges perform at the New York State Pavilion; an epiphany for Bermowitz. He would later say, "It showed me you didn't have to do static artworks, you could create situations, do something environmental. That's what got me moving more intensely in the direction of doing music. Compared with Iggy, whatever I was doing as an artist felt insignificant."

In 1970, Bermowitz, now referred to as Alan Vega, met Martin "Rev" Reverby through the Art Workers' Coalition. With Rev, Vega began experimenting with electronic music, and formed Suicide, along with guitarist Paul Liebgott. According to a 2002 interview of Alan Vega, the name of the band was inspired by the title of a Ghost Rider comic-book issue titled "Satan Suicide". He further explained, "We were talking about society's suicide, especially American society. New York City was collapsing. The Vietnam War was going on. The name Suicide said it all to us."

Their first show was June 19, 1970 at the Project of Living Artists in lower Manhattan. They soon began billing themselves as "punk music". Liebegott left at the end of 1971, and they continued as a duo. By that point, Vega was no longer playing any instruments, and performed only vocals. Rev stopped playing drums and blowing whistle by early 1975. Suicide emerged alongside the early glam punk scene in New York, playing with the likes of the New York Dolls and the Fast. They courted a reputation for confrontational live shows inspired by Iggy Pop. Many of the band's early shows were at the Mercer Arts Center, alongside bands such as the New York Dolls and Eric Emerson and the Magic Tramps. During an early show at the Mercer Arts Center, David Johansen played harmonica with Suicide. Vega and Rev both dressed like "arty street thugs", and Vega was notorious for brandishing a motorcycle drive chain onstage. Vega once stated, "We started getting booed as soon as we came onstage. Just from the way we looked, they started giving us hell already." After the collapse of the Mercer Arts Center in 1973, Suicide played at Max's Kansas City and CBGB (before being banned), often sharing the bill with emerging punk bands. Their first album was reissued with bonus material, including "23 Minutes in Brussels", a recording of a Suicide concert that deteriorated into a riot.

Their first release was "Rocket U.S.A.", which was included on the 1976 Max's Kansas City compilation. The following year, they recorded and independently released their debut album, Suicide (1977), on Red Star Records. Although initial press reviews were divided (with Rolling Stone in particular giving it a scathing review), media recognition has changed over the years. Nick Hornby writes, "'Che', 'Ghost Rider'—these eerie, sturdy, proto-punk anthems rank among the most visionary, melodic experiments the rock realm has yet produced." Of note is the ten-minute "Frankie Teardrop", which tells the story of a poverty-stricken 20-year-old factory worker facing eviction who suffers a mental breakdown and then kills his child, wife, and himself, a narrative which is punctuated by Vega's shrieking screams. Critic Emerson Dameron writes that the song is "one of the most terrifying, riveting, absurd things I’ve ever heard." Hornby, in his book 31 Songs, describes the track as something you would listen to "only once".

They played their first overseas shows in 1978, supporting Elvis Costello and the Clash in the United Kingdom and Western Europe. They also played some solo gigs such as at the F Club in Leeds on 1 August 1978. After a tour opening for the Cars, Alan Vega received a call from Michael Zilkha of Ze Records asking if he could sign Suicide to his label. They subsequently recorded their sophomore album Suicide: Alan Vega and Martin Rev with Ze at the Power Station studios. While the album was a critical success, it was not a commercial success, Alan Vega felt that "nothing big for us happened" after the second album was released in comparison to the first album.

=== 1980s and beyond ===
After the second album's release, Suicide would sporadically release new music, mostly to mixed critical and commercial reception, releasing their last album, American Supreme, in 2002. During this time, they both became involved in their own projects. In 1986, Alan Vega collaborated with Andrew Eldritch of the Sisters of Mercy on the Gift album, released under the name of The Sisterhood. In 1996, Vega collaborated with Alex Chilton and Ben Vaughn on the album Cubist Blues. Vega and Rev have both released solo albums.

In 2008, Blast First Petite released Alan Vega 70th Birthday Limited Edition EP Series—a monthly, limited-edition series of 10" vinyl EPs and downloads by major artists, honoring Alan Vega's 70th birthday. Among those paying tribute were Bruce Springsteen, Primal Scream, Peaches, Grinderman, Spiritualized, the Horrors, +Pansonic, Julian Cope, Lydia Lunch, Vincent Gallo, LIARS, and the Klaxons. The label also released Suicide: 1977–1978, a 6-CD box set, the same year.

In September 2009, the group performed their debut LP live in its entirety as part of the All Tomorrow's Parties-curated Don't Look Back series.

In May 2010, the band performed the entire first album live at two London concerts, double billed with Iggy and the Stooges performing Raw Power. The band performed their final concert at London's Barbican Centre on 9 July 2015. Billed as 'A Punk Mass', the show featured solo sets by both Rev and Vega before a headlining Suicide performance. Henry Rollins, Bobby Gillespie, and Jehnny Beth made guest appearances. The concert received positive reviews.

They played their final shows in 2015, canceling shows scheduled for the following year due to Vega's declining health and eventual death. Alan Vega died in his sleep on July 16, 2016, at the age of 78. His death was announced by musician and radio host Henry Rollins, who shared an official statement from Vega's family on his website.

== Musical style ==
Rev's simple keyboard riffs, which were initially played on a battered Farfisa organ combined with effects units, before changing to a synthesizer, were accompanied by primitive drum machines. This provided a pulsing, minimalistic, electronic backdrop for Vega's murmuring and nervy vocals. It was the first band to use the term punk to describe itself, which the band had adopted from an article by Lester Bangs. Some of the band's earliest posters use the terms punk music and punk music mass.

According to writer Alexandre Breton, the duo was influenced by musicians such as Elvis Presley, Gene Vincent, Eddie Cochran, Johnny Burnette, Lou Reed and Captain Beefheart. Vega directly cited artists including the Velvet Underground, Iggy Pop, ? and the Mysterians, and Silver Apples. Additionally, Martin Rev was a student of Lennie Tristano, and Rev was also influenced by jazz musicians like John Coltrane. The duo was also influenced by films and directors such as Alejandro Jodorowsky’s El Topo, David Lynch and John Waters.

In a 1978 interview for Melody Maker, the band state that their music is a reflection of a troubled world, and Vega said "there are too many people", "no food and energy" and this feeling of self-destructiveness is resonated in their musical style.

== Legacy ==
The Guardian reported that "Suicide's aggressive synthesiser rock has been cited as an influence by bands such as Radiohead, U2, New Order, and Depeche Mode; electronic acts such as Daft Punk and Aphex Twin; and Bruce Springsteen, who covered the song 'Dream Baby Dream'." Music journalist Colin Larkin wrote that Suicide, "with their potent fusion of rockabilly and electronic music on cheap equipment", became an important influence on the Birthday Party, Sigue Sigue Sputnik and Nine Inch Nails. Critic Toby Creswell listed Devo, Ultravox and Air among "Suicide's heirs", those acts having "benefited from their pioneering sheets of industrial music". Rob Sheffield of Rolling Stone reported that "countless artists" have been heavily inspired by Suicide's debut album, including the Human League, Bauhaus and Spacemen 3.

Synth-pop duo Soft Cell stated that its sound came from "trying to make a pop version" of Suicide's abrasive, synth-driven music. Other artists who have cited Suicide as an influence include the Sisters of Mercy, the Jesus and Mary Chain, Nick Cave, Steve Albini, Ariel Pink, AFI, and Hot Snakes.

== Covers ==
Henry Rollins recorded a version of "Ghost Rider" for his solo debut, Hot Animal Machine. With Rollins Band he re-recorded the song (but at a much slower tempo) for The Crow: Original Motion Picture Soundtrack. That same year The Fatima Mansions released a cover of "Diamonds, Fur Coat, Champagne", as part of its 1994 single "Nite Flights". In May 1999, ? and the Mysterians released a cover of "Cheree" on the album More Action.

The riff from "Ghost Rider" was sampled extensively in M.I.A.'s single "Born Free", released in April 2010. Martin Rev joined M.I.A. to perform the song on the Late Show with David Letterman.

In mid-2009, the band the Horrors released a cover of the song "Shadazz", as part of a tribute to Alan Vega and his work. The band performed it many times live, along with another Suicide song, "Ghost Rider". Later that year, Primal Scream and Miss Kittin covered the song "Diamonds, Fur Coat, Champagne" for a limited-edition 10-inch vinyl pressing. A total of 3,000 copies were pressed and released on March 30, 2009.

"Ghost Rider" was covered by the garage punk band the Gories and released on the album Cheapo Crypt Sampler No. 2. In April 2011, the influential dance-punk band LCD Soundsystem used a snippet from "Ghost Rider" during the song "Losing My Edge", and covered the Alan Vega solo effort "Bye Bye Bayou" during their final concert, held in a sold-out Madison Square Garden. The song was also covered by British duo The Last Shadow Puppets at New York City's Terminal 5, as a tribute to Alan Vega, shortly after his death in 2016.

In April 2012, Neneh Cherry released a cover of the song "Dream Baby Dream", which appeared on her album The Cherry Thing. In May 2014, the band Savages released a live cover of the song as a B-side of their single "Fuckers"/"Dream Baby Dream" 12". Other artists who covered the song include Bruce Springsteen in 2016, and Many Angled Ones & Guy McKnight in August 2018.

== Discography ==
Both Alan Vega and Martin Rev have recorded solo albums; see Alan Vega discography and Martin Rev discography.

=== Studio albums ===
- 1977 – Suicide
- 1980 – Suicide: Alan Vega and Martin Rev
- 1988 – A Way of Life
  - The 2005 Blast First/Mute/EMI CD reissue has a slightly different mix of the album, most notably the song "Surrender", and includes a live bonus disc recorded in 1987 and videos for "Dominic Christ" and "Surrender" by Stefan Roloff.
- 1992 – Why Be Blue
  - The 2005 Blast First/Mute/EMI CD reissue includes a live bonus disc recorded in 1989 and a complete remix by Martin Rev of the original album and different track order.
- 2002 – American Supreme
  - Initial CD copies included a live bonus disc recorded in 1998.

=== Live albums ===
- 1978 – 21½ Minutes in Berlin/23 Minutes in Brussels
- 1981 – Half Alive (a collection of live and demo material recorded from 1975 to 1979; originally released by ROIR on cassette only, with liner notes by Lester Bangs)
- 1986 – Ghost Riders (a live concert from 1981 – originally released on cassette only)
- 1997 – Zero Hour (late-'70s live recordings)
- 2004 – Attempted: Live at Max's Kansas City 1980 (soundboard recordings from a New York City rock club performance; with liner notes by Marty Thau)
- 2008 – Live 1977–1978 (a six-CD box set containing 13 complete Suicide live performances from September 1977 to August 1978 plus bonus material)

=== EPs ===
- 1978 – 23 Minutes Over Brussels
- 1998 – 22/1/98 – Reinventing America (recorded live at The Barbican – "Inventing America" launch party)

=== Singles ===
- "Johnny" (1977)
- "Cheree" / "I Remember" (1978)
- "Dream Baby Dream" / "Radiation" (1979)
- "Surrender" (1988)
