= Mantra (Dave Grohl song) =

Song by Dave Grohl, Josh Homme and Trent Reznor

from the album Sound City: Real to Reel
- Released: March 12, 2013
- Genre: Alternative rock
- Length: 7:43
- Label: RCA
- Songwriters: Dave Grohl; Josh Homme; Trent Reznor

Music video
- "Mantra" official music video on YouTube (instrumental version) "Mantra" official music video on YouTube (with vocals & guitars)

"Mantra" is a song by Dave Grohl, Josh Homme, and Trent Reznor from the 2013 album Sound City: Real to Reel, the soundtrack to the 2013 documentary Sound City. Grohl was joined by different artists for different tracks as Grohl's Sound City Players. For "Mantra", the final track on the album, he was joined by Homme and Reznor. Homme also appeared on two other tracks on the album, "Centipede" and "A Trick With No Sleeve".

== History ==
The song was recorded during the jam sessions at Studio 606, which is Grohl and the Foo Fighters' own studio, where Grohl moved the notorious Neve 8028 console from Sound City after it had closed. The collaboration for "Mantra" was announced on December 14, 2012, two days after the live debut of another song, "Cut Me Some Slack", which features ex-Nirvana bandmates Dave Grohl, Krist Novoselic, Pat Smear, and ex-Beatle Paul McCartney.

Live footage from the studio, which features Grohl, Homme and Reznor performing an instrumental version of "Mantra", was released via Rolling Stone's official website on March 7, 2013. In a second step were added Reznor's distorted guitar and the interweaving between the singing of the three musicians: "Grohl delivers the primary vocal, but by song's end, Reznor has grabbed the mic, while Homme delivers harmonies and guitar work throughout."

== Reception ==
The song received positive reviews from the critics. Chris Martins of Spin praised the track, calling it a "transcendent, nearly eight-minute track." He also noted the song's transition, with describing it as a song "which opens with a simple drum beat and bass, then slowly grows into a gargantuan slab of soulful rock before ending in an orchestral explosion of guitars and keys and fuzz"; "a delicate tapestry supported by percussive beats and occasional piano trills midway through this one. It has the big layering crescendo typical of Reznor’s work, and is quite impressive. It also features a lengthy Nine Inch Nails-esque bass and effects-heavy breakdown." Michael Nelson of Stereogum stated that the song does a "surprisingly good job of featuring all three of its stars" and found it "very subdued and gently textured". The song was also compared to Reznor's recent works with How to Destroy Angels. Rolling Stone also gave the song a positive review, complimenting the "trio's impeccable chemistry".

== Personnel ==
- Dave Grohl – lead vocals, drums
- Josh Homme – bass, guitar, backing vocals
- Trent Reznor – electric piano, guitar, lead vocals
