= Sound City =

Sound City may refer to:

- Soundcity TV, a Nigerian television music channel
- Sound City Studios, music recording studios
- Sound City (film), a 2013 documentary film produced and directed by Dave Grohl
- Sound City: Real to Reel, soundtrack for the Sound City film

== See also ==
- Sound City Players, supergroup formed by Dave Grohl
- Shepperton Film Studios, film studios historically known as Sound City
