= Chime (Dessa album) =

2018 album by Dessa

Studio album by Dessa
- Released: February 23, 2018
- Studio: Instrument Landing; The Birdcage
- Genre: Alternative hip hop; avant-pop
- Length: 34:12
- Label: Doomtree Records
- Producer: Lazerbeak; Andy Thompson

Dessa chronology
Parts of Speech (2013)	Chime (2018)	Bury the Lede (2023)

Singles from Chime
- 1. "5 Out of 6" Released: February 7, 2018

Professional ratings
Review scores
Source	Rating
The A.V. Club	B+

Chime is the fourth studio album by Dessa, a member of Minneapolis indie hip hop collective Doomtree. It was released by Doomtree Records on February 23, 2018.

== Reception ==
Chime peaked at 139 on the Billboard 200 chart.

== Track listing ==
Credits adapted from liner notes.

All lyrics written by Dessa.

No.	Title	Music	Length
1.	"Ride"	Aaron Mader; Andy Thompson	3:25
2.	"5 out of 6"	Mader; Chanceller Clift; Thompson	3:33
3.	"Fire Drills"	Mader; Thompson	3:18
4.	"Velodrome"	Dessa Wander; Mader; Thompson	3:08
5.	"Good Grief"	Mader; John Samels; Thompson	4:15
6.	"Boy Crazy"	Wander; Mader; Thompson	3:10
7.	"Jumprope"	Wander; Mader; Thompson	3:01
8.	"Shrimp"	Mader; Kyle Smith; Thompson	0:46
9.	"Half of You"	Mader; Anagram Norton; Thompson	3:30
10.	"Say When"	Wander; Mader; Samels; Thompson	3:42
11.	"I Hope I'm Wrong"	Mader; Gabriel Bethke; Thompson	2:24

== Personnel ==
Credits adapted from liner notes.

- Dessa – vocals, lyrics, recording on "Half of You"
- Andy Thompson – engineer, recording on all tracks except "Half of You", executive production
- Lazerbeak – executive production
- Bruce Templeton – mastering
- Joe Mabbott – mixing on all tracks except "Good Grief"
- Lance Conrad – mixing on "Good Grief"
- Andy Lund – design, layout
- Bill Phelps – photography

== Charts ==
Chart	Peak position
US Billboard 200	139
