= Giants in the Trees =

American rock band (2017–2020)

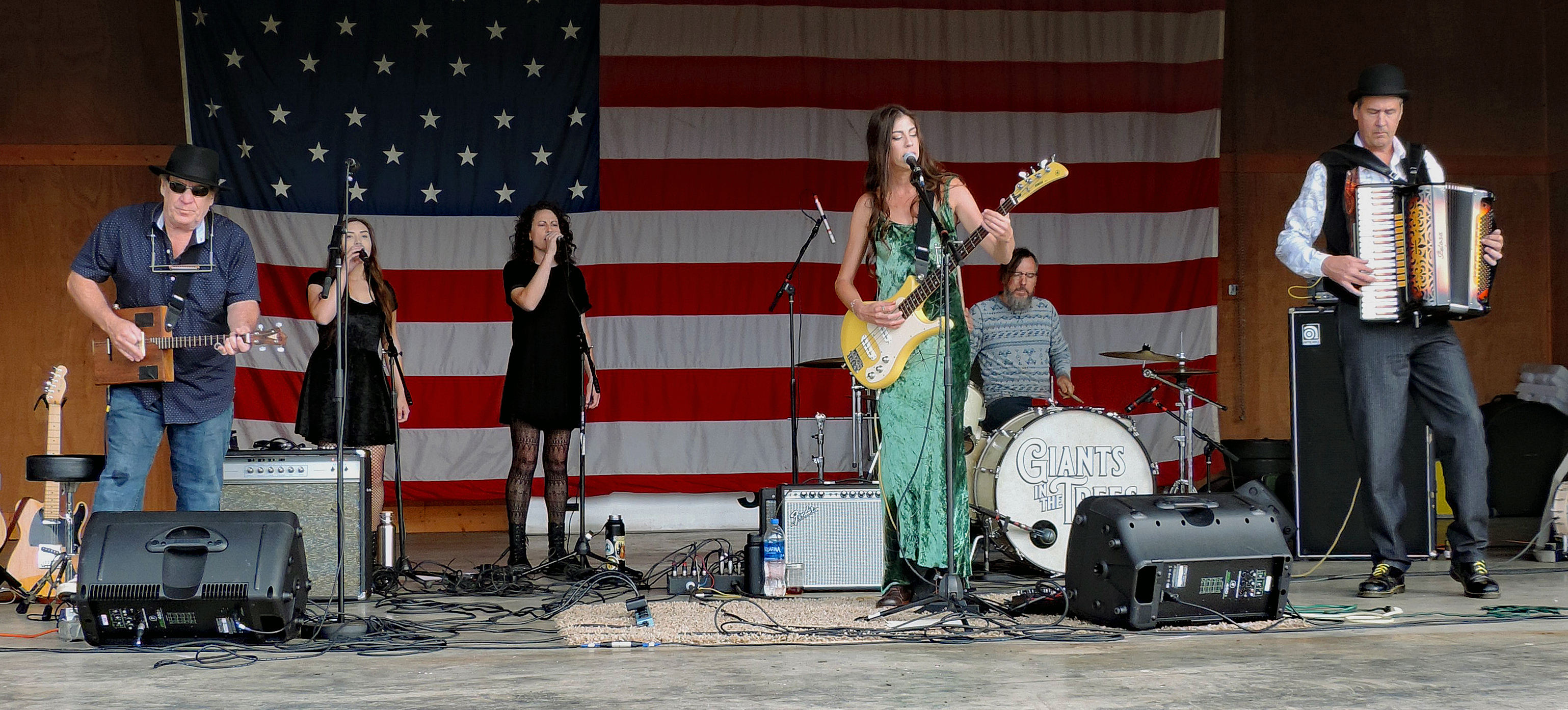
- Giants in the Trees in 2019

Background information
- Origin: Wahkiakum County, Washington
- Genres: Alternative rock
- Years active: 2017–2020
- Labels: Giants in the Trees, LLC.
- Past members: Krist Novoselic; Jillian Raye; Erik Friend; Ray Prestegard
- Website: http://giantsinthetrees.com/

Giants in the Trees was an American rock band formed in Wahkiakum County, Washington, in 2017. The band was formed by bassist Krist Novoselic, who created the band as a local musical project. Novoselic, Jillian Raye, Erik Friend, and Ray Prestegard were the current band members of Giants in the Trees, until 2020. Often, Jennifer Johnson joins on vocals.

== History ==
The band started by writing two songs in the first two days of playing together; "Sasquatch" and "Center of the Earth". "Sasquatch" was their first officially released song, in July 2017; it was released alongside a music video that Krist joked as "costing over 2 million U.S. dollars to produce."

Giants in the Trees' self-titled debut album was released in late 2017. The band's second album, Volume 2, was released on March 29, 2019.

Novoselic, Raye, and Johnson formed the supergroup 3rd Secret in 2022, alongside Soundgarden's Matt Cameron and Kim Thayil and Void's Bubba Dupree.

Novoselic stated in an essay in 2023, that the band "fizzled out" in 2020, due to the coronavirus pandemic.

== Discography ==
- Giants in the Trees (2017)
- Volume 2 (2019)
