= Of Grunge and Government =

2004 book by Krist Novoselic

Of Grunge and Government: Let's Fix This Broken Democracy
- Author: Krist Novoselic
- Language: English
- Genre: Politics
- Publication date: September 2004
- ISBN: 0-9719-2065-6

Of Grunge and Government: Let's Fix This Broken Democracy (ISBN 0-9719-2065-6) is a political non-fiction book written by rock musician Krist Novoselic, who was the bassist for Nirvana. Published in September 2004, the book details how politicians need to return to grassroots movements and clean up politics in general.

In the book, Novoselic discusses how Nirvana emerged as the world's biggest band of the early 1990s, how he got involved in politics and why electoral reform is needed, in particular proportional representation and instant runoff voting.
