= Dessa =

American rapper and writer (born 1981)

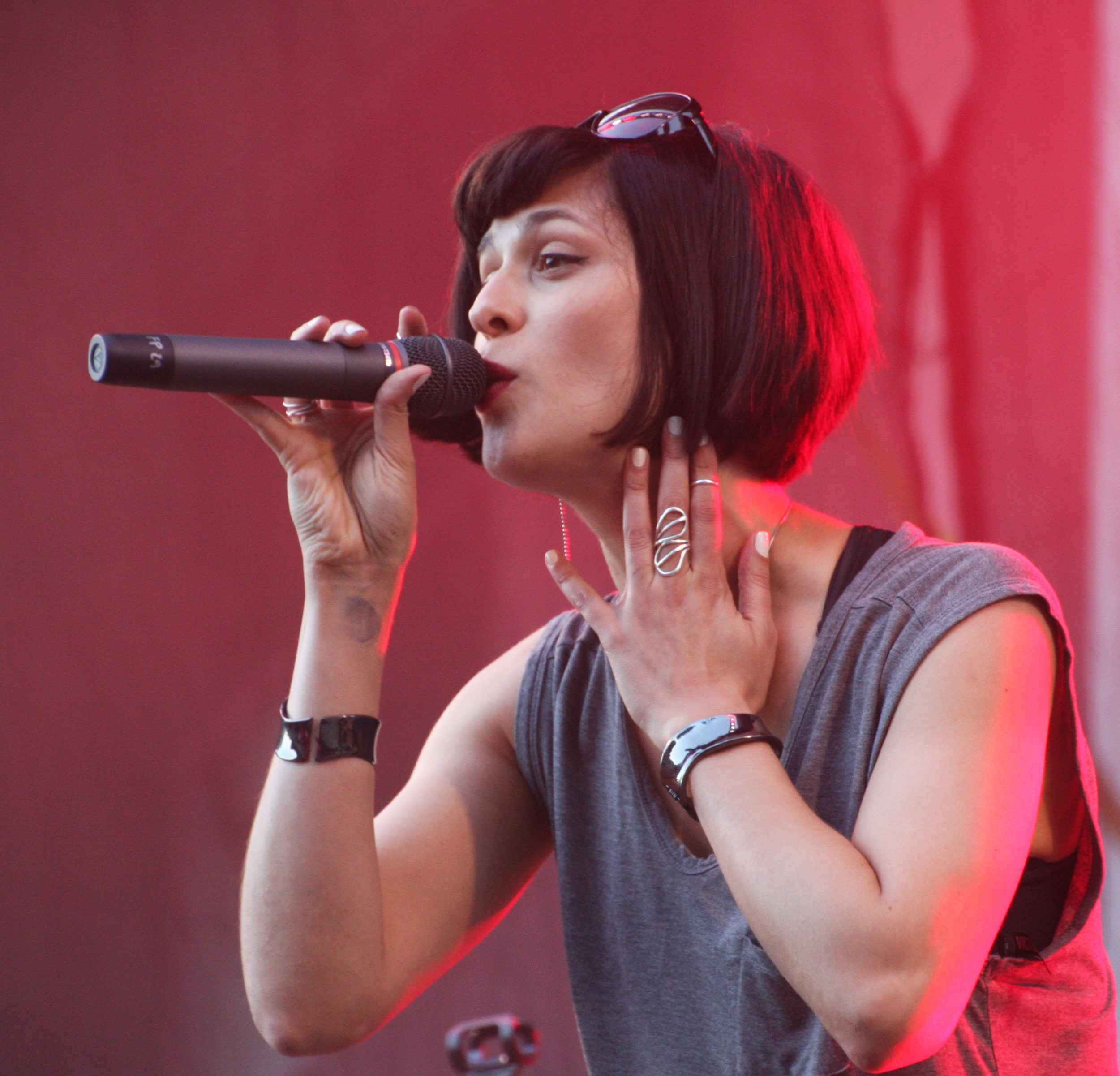
- Dessa in 2017

Background information
- Also known as: Maggie Wander, Dessa Darling, Dessa Margret Wander
- Born: Margret Wander; May 23, 1981 (age 45)
- Origin: Minneapolis, Minnesota, U.S.
- Genres: Hip-hop; alternative hip-hop
- Occupations: Rapper; singer; producer; writer; record executive
- Years active: 2002–present
- Label: Doomtree Records
- Website: dessawander.com

Margret Wander (born May 23, 1981), better known by her stage name Dessa Darling, or simply Dessa, is an American singer, rapper, musician, writer, and former record executive. She is a member of the indie hip-hop collective Doomtree.

== Early life ==
Dessa was born to Robert Wander Jr. and Sylvia Burgos Toftness, and has a younger brother, Max. Her father is white and her mother Puerto Rican. Dessa went to Southwest High School in Minneapolis, Minnesota, graduating from the IB Diploma Programme in 1999. She attended the University of Minnesota, where she earned a B.A. in philosophy. Before becoming an artist full-time, she waited tables and worked as a technical writer for a medical manufacturer.

== Career ==
=== Doomtree ===
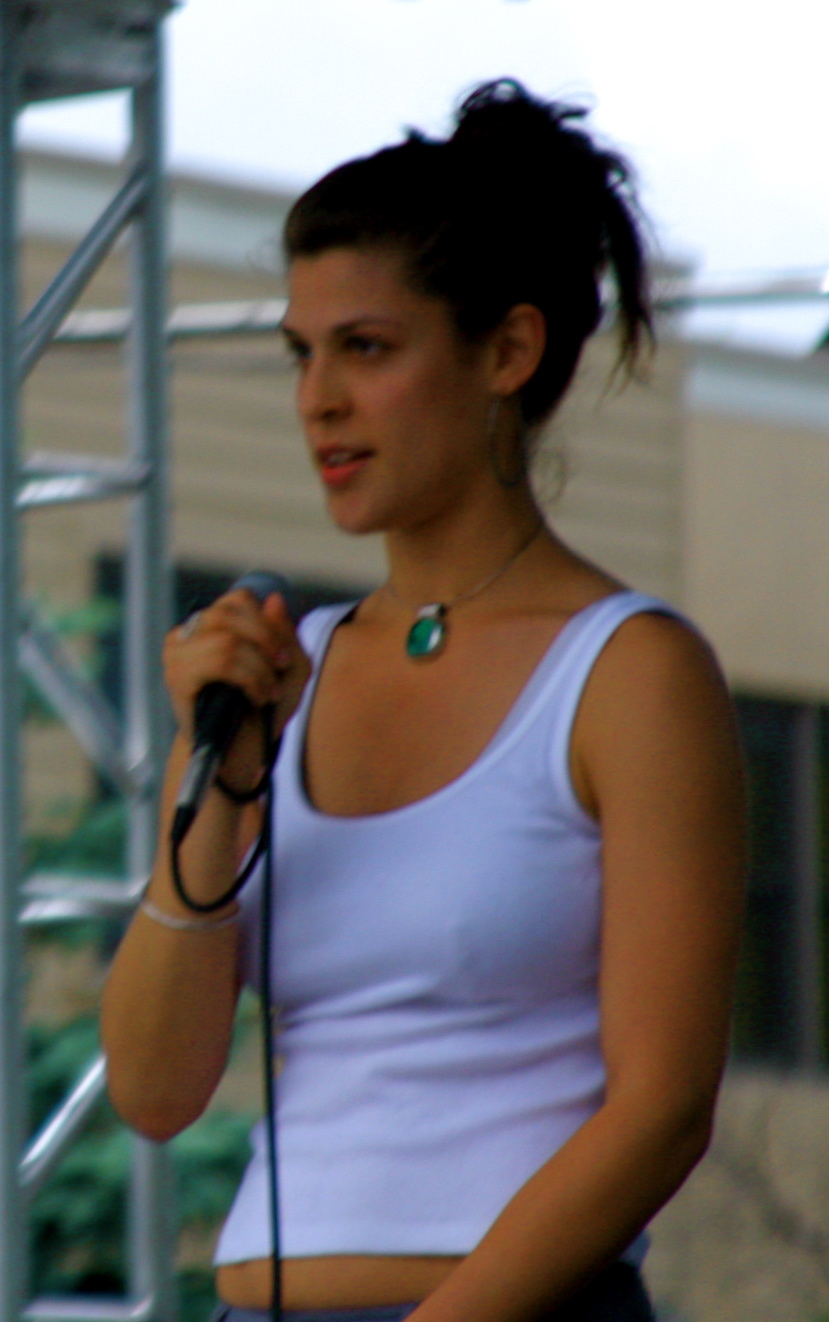
Dessa performing in 2007

Initially drawn to their raw aesthetics and unique sound, Dessa forged a friendship with Doomtree. Soon after, she was asked to join the crew and did so. Between 2005 and 2019, Dessa toured with and appeared on all Doomtree albums, as well as on the other members' solo albums. She was the CEO of Doomtree; however, she relinquished that post to her label mate, Lazerbeak, to focus on her own career.

=== Solo career ===
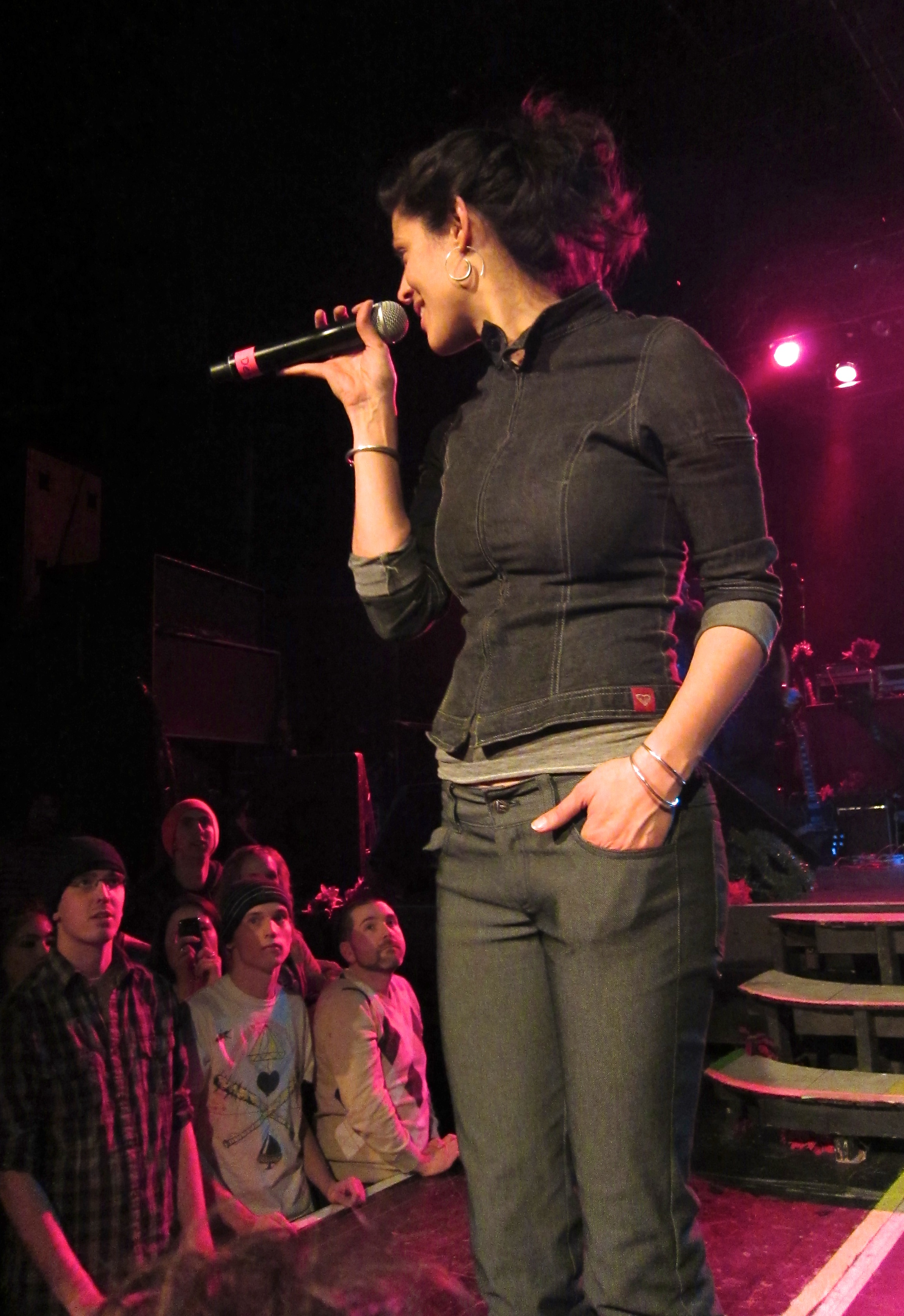
Dessa performing at First Avenue in 2010

Dessa's debut solo EP, False Hopes, was released in 2005. Despite being only fifteen minutes long, it was listed as one of the top local albums of the year by Star Tribune.

Dessa's first solo album, A Badly Broken Code, was released on January 19, 2010. The album’s tracks "Dixon's Girl" and "The Chaconne” were released as singles. The album featured production from Paper Tiger, MK Larada, Lazerbeak, Cecil Otter and Big Jess. MK Larada also designed the album art.

In 2011, Dessa released Castor, the Twin, an album featuring new recordings and arrangements of songs released on previous projects, primarily A Badly Broken Code. The original production in the reworked tracks was replaced with live instrumentation.

In 2013, Dessa released her second full-length album Parts of Speech that made its debut in Billboard's Top 200. The singles from this album are "Warsaw" and "Call Off Your Ghost”.

On February 23, 2018, Dessa released her third full-length album Chime, that made its debut in Billboard's Top 200, and at #3 on Billboard's Independent Charts. Chime was listed as one of NPR Music's 40 Favorite Albums of 2018 (so far).

On March 26 and 28, 2019, she recorded concerts with the Minnesota Orchestra; the collaboration led to a live album released in November 2019.

On January 15, 2021, Dessa released "Rome”, the first title in her IDES Series. The IDES series is a project to release a new single on each 15th for the first half of 2021.

=== Writing works ===
At the fourth annual Doomtree Blowout in 2008, and via Doomtree Press, Dessa released Spiral Bound a seventy-page collection of fiction and poetry. Following that, in 2013, she released a book of poems called A Pound Of Steam, in partnership with Rain Taxi.

After having been scouted by the Francis Golden Literary Agency, in 2018 Dessa signed a book-publishing deal with Dutton Penguin, which released her collection of creative non-fiction essays entitled My Own Devices: True Stories from the Road on Music, Science, and Senseless Love on September 18, 2018. The book is an uncompromising and candid account of her life in motion, in music, and in love, and was listed by NPR in their guide for 2018's Best Reads.

Dessa's work has also been published in periodicals, including a 2009 poem in Ars Medica and a 2017 article about visiting New Orleans as a tourist in The New York Times Magazine.

=== Side projects and non-Doomtree collaborations ===
Dessa is a founding member of The Boy Sopranos, an almost all-female a cappella group, with frequent collaborators Jessy Greene, Aby Wolf and others. She also taught at the Institute of Production and recording and the McNally Smith College of Music. She was also a member of the indie super-group Gayngs founded by Ryan Olson (of Poliça fame), in 2010, along with 22 other musicians including Justin Vernon.

On March 2, 2012, Dessa presented "Mic Lines: Art, Ethics, and their Contested Connections" at Augsburg College in Minneapolis, Minnesota, as part of the three-day Nobel Peace Prize Forum .

Dessa was the host of Twin Cities Public Television's The Lowertown Line, a live music series, from 2012 to 2014.

In 2012, she partnered with the "artisan cosmetic house" from Minnesota, Elixery, to create her own shade of lipstick, all of the proceeds of which were donated to CARE (relief agency).

She was a contributing artist on the 2015 Saint Paul-based "Plume Project", a public art installment in which images and colors were projected onto steam rising from a smokestack in downtown Saint Paul and music and spoken-word pieces could be accessed by calling a phone number. Dessa read her poem "Circle Games".

She had a flavor of ice cream named after her on July 27, 2016, by Izzy's Ice Cream, "Dessa’s Existential Crunch". The same year, she contributed to The Hamilton Mixtape with her cover of the song "Congratulations.". Dessa collaborated with RockFilter Distillery in Spring Grove, MN, to release two bourbons, Dessa's Time and Distance and Dessa's Hand Shadow.

Dessa has been involved with the popular fiction podcast Welcome to Night Vale as both a contributing writer and musical guest. Her first appearance was on the "Weather" segment of Episode 27, "First Date," which featured Doomtree's "Team The Best Team." She was the musical guest for Welcome to Night Vale's second anniversary live show, performing "Call Off Your Ghost" for its weather segment. She appeared again as part of Doomtree for episode 61, "Briny Depths", which featured "The Bends" as its Weather; her single "Fire Drills" was the Weather for episode 122, "A Story of Love and Horror, Part 2: 'Spire.'" In 2017, she co-wrote and acted in episode 113, "Niecelet," lending her voice to the character Sabina.

=== Notable performances ===
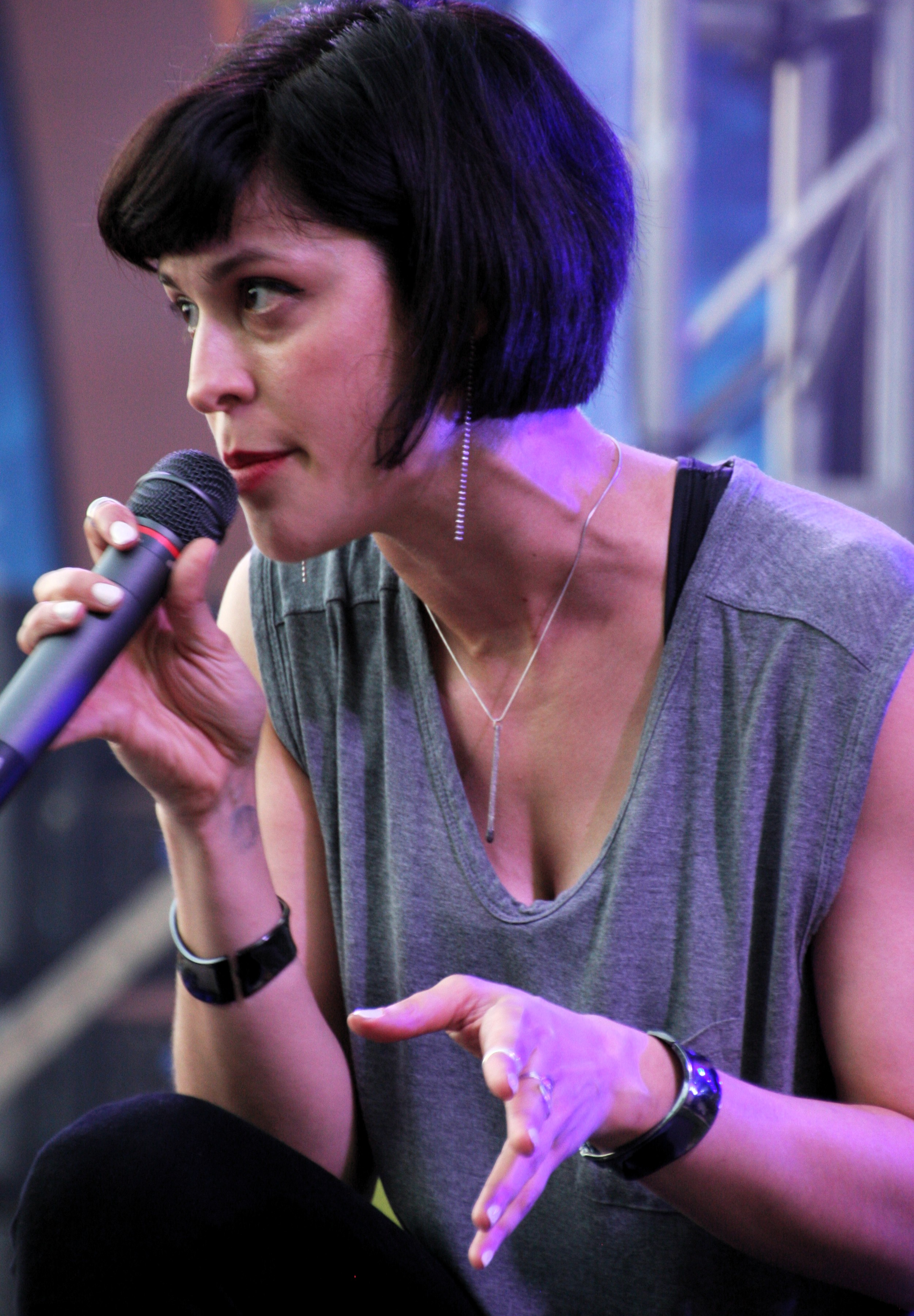
Dessa performing at the Mayo Civic Center in 2017

In April 2017, she headlined a show with the Minnesota Orchestra, which featured new arrangements of her songs as well as a story performed in prose. She followed that set of performances with another two sold-out performances in October 2018, this time premiering new material from her album Chime. In December 2018, it was announced that Dessa would return for an additional two performances with the Minnesota Orchestra, on March 26 and 28, 2019; both performances were recorded to be released at a later date in collaboration with Doomtree Records.

Dessa sang the National Anthem at the Minnesota Twins home opener on April 5, 2018. And on July 28, 2018, she sang the National Anthem at the 2018 WNBA All-star game held in Minneapolis.

In August 2018, Dessa traveled with the Minnesota Orchestra as they went on a two-week, five-stop tour through South Africa, reportedly the first tour of an American orchestra to the country, and helped document the trip for Minnesota Public Radio alongside MPR journalist and cultural critic Euan Kerr.

U.S. Senator Amy Klobuchar used Dessa's song "Bullpen" as her campaign rally walk-on song during her 2020 run for the presidency.

=== Deeply Human ===
Dessa is the host of the podcast Deeply Human. The show explores questions about the inner self and takes a deep dive into the psychological, biological, and anthropological explanations of our common traits. Episodes are anchored in her experience discovering the details of her own thoughts and actions. Deeply Human launched in March 2021 and is a co-production of the BBC World Service, American Public Media, and iHeartMedia.

== Discography ==
=== Solo studio albums ===
List of solo studio albums, with selected chart positions
Title	Album details	Peak chart positions			
Title	Album details	US	US Heat	US Hip-Hop	US Indie
A Badly Broken Code	Released: January 19, 2010; Label: Doomtree Records; Formats: CD, download	–	13	48	–
Castor, the Twin	Released: October 4, 2011; Label: Doomtree Records; Formats: CD, download	–	8	26	36
Parts of Speech	Released: June 25, 2013; Label: Doomtree Records; Formats: CD, download, vinyl	74	–	–	19
Chime	Released: February 23, 2018; Label: Doomtree Records; Formats: CD, download, vinyl	139	–	–	3
Bury the Lede	Released: September 29, 2023; Label: Doomtree Records; Formats: CD, download, vinyl	-	–	–	-

=== with Doomtree ===
- Doomtree (Doomtree, 2008)
- No Kings (Doomtree, 2011)
- All Hands (Doomtree, 2015)

=== EPs ===
- Apple S Apple Z (2003) (with Medida)
- Medida (2004) (with Medida)
- False Hopes (Doomtree, 2005)
- Parts of Speech, Re-Edited (Doomtree, 2014)
- Ides (Doomtree, 2021)

=== Live albums ===
- Sound the Bells (Doomtree, 2019) (with the Minnesota Orchestra)

=== Singles ===
- "Matches to Paper Dolls ('Castor, the Twin' Mix)" (2013)
- "Warsaw" (2013)
- "Call Off Your Ghost" (2013)
- "Quinine" (2016)
- "Good Grief" (2017)
- "Fire Drills" (2017)
- "5 Out of 6" (2018)
- "Grade School Games" (2019)
- "Good For You" (2019)
- "Tyranny" (2020)
- "Rome" (2021)
- "Who's Yellen Now?" (2021)
- "Bombs Away" (2021)
- "Life on Land" (2021)
- "Terry Gross" (2021)
- "Talking Business" (2021)
- "I Already Like You" (2021)
- "LYTP" (2021)
- "Blush" (2022)
- "Hurricane Party / Chopper" (2023)
- "Decoy" (2023)

=== Guest appearances ===
- Sims – "No Homeowners" from Lights Out Paris (2005)
- Kanser – "No D in Erogenous" from Kanser (2005)
- Paper Tiger – "Speedmetal" from False Hopes (2007)
- Mel Gibson and the Pants – "Bit of a Buzz" from Sea vs. Shining Sea (2007)
- Heiruspecs – "Change Is Coming" from Heiruspecs (2008)
- P.O.S – "Low Light Low Life" from Never Better (2008)
- Paper Tiger – "Palace" and "And the Camera" from Made Like Us (2010)
- Lazerbeak – "Bound" from Legend Recognize Legend (2010)
- Gayngs – "No Sweat" "Faded High" from Relayted (2010)
- p-teK – "This Bridge Is Burning for You" from Oh! What a Miracle! (2011)
- Hamilton Mixtape – "Congratulations" from Hamilton Mixtape (2016)
- Lin-Manuel Miranda – "Almost Like Praying" – Benefit single for Hurricane Maria Relief (2017)
- Joey Van Phillips – "Broken Arrow" (with P.O.S.) from Punch Bowl (2017)
- Cover version of the Mountain Goats' song "Balance" for I Only Listen to the Mountain Goats (2018)
- Sims X Air Credits X Icetep – "Hologramme" from Artería Verité (2018)

== Bibliography ==
- Spiral Bound (2009)
- Sleeping with Nikki (2011)
- Are You Handsome (2013)
- A Pound of Steam (2013)
- My Own Devices: True Stories from the Road on Music, Science, and Senseless Love (Dutton, 2018) ISBN 978-1524742294)
- Tits on the Moon (2022)
