= Giants in the Trees (album) =

Studio album by Giants in the Trees
- Released: November 23, 2017
- Genre: Alternative rock
- Length: 50:28
- Label: Giants in the Trees, LLC.

Giants in the Trees chronology
Giants in the Trees (2017)	Volume 2 (2019)

Singles from Giants in the Trees
- 1. "Sasquatch" Released: July 26, 2017; 2. "Seed Song" Released: November 26, 2017

Giants in the Trees is the self-titled debut album by American alternative rock band Giants in the Trees. It features the debut single "Sasquatch", from whose lyrics the band gets its name.

== Track listing ==
All tracks are written by Giants in the Trees

No.	Title	Length
1.	"Sasquatch"	3:41
2.	"Center of the Earth"	4:02
3.	"Seed Song"	3:26
4.	"Ode to Pacific Anarchism"	3:51
5.	"The in-Between"	4:11
6.	"System Slave"	3:35
7.	"Pretend"	5:06
8.	"Paper Life"	2:57
9.	"Dark Cloud"	4:03
10.	"Something for Everyone"	5:23
11.	"Moving Targets"	3:00
12.	"One of a Kind"	5:03
Total length:		50:28

== Personnel ==
Personnel taken from Giants in the Trees liner notes.

Giants in the Trees

- Erik Friend
- Jillian Raye
- Ray Prestegard
- Krist Novoselic

Production

- Erik Friend — recording
- Jack Endino — mixing
- Tim Gabor — art & design
