= Songs and Advice for Kids Who Have Been Left Behind =

EP by The Stinkypuffs
- Released: November 26, 1996
- Genre: Indie rock
- Label: Elemental Records

The Stinkypuffs chronology
A Little Tiny Smelly Bit of...the Stinky Puffs (1995)	Songs and Advice for Kids Who Have Been Left Behind (1996)

Professional ratings
Review scores
Source	Rating
AllMusic	3/5 stars
Robert Christgau	(neither)
SFWeekly	(mixed)

Songs and Advice for Kids Who Have Been Left Behind is a seven-song EP released by 1990s cult rock band The Stinky Puffs. Released in 1996, it was also their last. The band's frontman, Simon Fair Timony, said he based the songs on the release on what he felt and learned after Kurt Cobain's death.

== Track listing ==
1. "I Know I Know"
2. "The Vitamin Song"
3. "I'll Love You Anyway" (written about Kurt Cobain)
4. "Rubber Pen"
5. "The Three Tuners"
6. "Bummer Skit"
7. "Dream Weaver" (cover of Gary Wright hit)
