= A Little Tiny Smelly Bit of...the Stinky Puffs =

A Little Tiny Smelly Bit of... The Stinky Puffs

Studio album by The Stinky Puffs
- Released: 1995
- Recorded: WaterWorks Studios, New York, New York and the Capitol Theater, Olympia, Washington
- Genre: Alternative rock, indie rock
- Length: 13:11
- Label: Elemental

The Stinky Puffs chronology
The Stinky Puffs (1991)	A Little Tiny Smelly Bit of... The Stinky Puffs (1995)	Songs and Advice for Kids Who Have Been Left Behind (1996)

A Little Tiny Smelly Bit of... The Stinky Puffs is The Stinky Puffs first release following the band's self-titled debut in 1991. It includes four songs recorded in the studio, followed by the same four songs recorded live at the Capitol Theater in Olympia, Washington as part of the Yoyo A Go Go Festival in July 1994. "Pizza Break" acts as an intermission between the two recordings. The album is notable for containing the first live performances of Nirvana members Krist Novoselic and Dave Grohl following the death of Kurt Cobain, whom the track "I'll Love You Anyway" was written about. The live tracks also feature Ira Kaplan of Yo La Tengo.

== Track listing ==
All songs written and composed by Simon Fair Timony and Don Fleming, except where noted.

1. "Buddies Aren't Butts" (Ranaldo) – 1:56
2. "Menendez' Killed Their Parents" – 1:17
3. "I'll Love You Anyway" – 1:45
4. "I Am Gross!/No You're Not!" – 1:20
5. "Pizza Break" – 0:40
6. "Buddies Aren't Butts" (live) – 1:55
7. "Menendez' Killed Their Parents" (live) – 0:50
8. "I'll Love You Anyway" (live) – 1:43
9. "I Am Gross!/No You're Not!" (live) – 1:40

== Personnel ==
- Simon Fair Timony – vocals
- Cody Linn Ranaldo – guitar (tracks 1–4)
- Don Fleming – guitar (tracks 1–4)
- Sheenah Fair – drums
- Eric Eble – bass (tracks 1–4), guitar (tracks 6–9)
- Jad Fair – effects
- Krist Novoselic – bass (tracks 6–9)
- Dave Grohl – drums (tracks 6–9)
- Ira Kaplan – guitar (tracks 6–9)
