= The Stinky Puffs =

The Stinky Puffs were an early 1990s rock band composed of seven-year-old Simon Fair Timony, then-stepson of Jad Fair, and Cody Linn Ranaldo, son of Sonic Youth guitarist Lee Ranaldo. After a 7" single an LP followed in 1995 titled A Little Tiny Smelly Bit of...the Stinky Puffs and an EP in 1996 titled Songs and Advice for Kids Who Have Been Left Behind.

Kurt Cobain, of the band Nirvana, was a fan of the band and friend of lead singer Timony. In Cobain's personal journal, he wrote a letter to Timony asking him to contribute artwork for what was to become In Utero. Timony also managed the fanclub of Nirvana. When he sold the fanclub-cards, he asked "Send candy not money!".

The Stinky Puffs performed in 1994 at the indie rock festival Yoyo A Go Go in Olympia, Washington. Surviving Nirvana members Krist Novoselic and Dave Grohl played bass and drums for the band, in their first shared public appearance since Kurt Cobain's death. The last song that they played was "I Love You Anyways," which a then 10-year-old Timony wrote about Cobain. The lyrics recall the times Timony spent with Cobain, doing things like smashing Cobain's guitar, and repeat Cobain's promise to "record with the Stinky Puffs".

In 2012, the Stinky Puffs were mentioned in an Esquire magazine article by Miles Raymer. In it, they were credited as the first band Nirvana backed (having recently backed Paul McCartney for the 12-12-12: The Concert for Sandy Relief).
