= Park City Live =

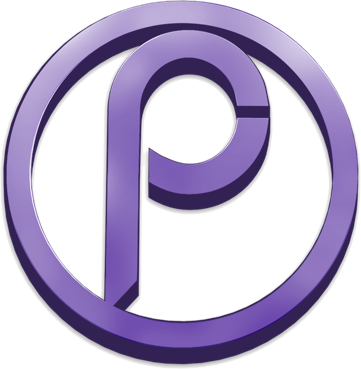
- Interactive map of Park City Live
- Address: 427 Main Street; Park City, Utah 84060
- Coordinates: 40°38′37.8″N 111°29′46.3″W
- Owner: Paul oakenfold
- Operator: Park City Live, LLC
- Capacity: 800

Construction
- Opened: 2012

Website
- parkcitylive.net
- Building details

General information
- Renovated: 2011
- Owner: Memorial Building, LLC

Park City Live is a music venue in Park City, Utah. Located inside the Memorial Building in the historic Main Street district, the concert venue opened in January 2012 with a performance by DJ Afrojack. Party City Live is the largest music venue in Park City, which plays host to the annual Sundance Film Festival.

== History ==
The venue is operated by Park City Live, LLC, which is owned by the married couple Kevin and Kathryn Burns. Since its opening, Park City Live has played host to a number notable performances many of which were held as part of the festivities surrounding the Sundance Festival. Among these were 2012 performances by deadmau5, OneRepublic, and Third Eye Blind. Headlining the concerts in 2013 was a performance from Sound City Players, a supergroup of seventeen artists led by Dave Grohl. The 2014 festival concert series included performances from Steve Aoki, Ludacris, Matisyahu, and O.A.R.

The annual music festival, re-inaugurated as Winterfest in 2015, included artists Iggy Azalea, Diplo, and Skrillex. Winterfest 2016 featured concerts from The Chainsmokers, Cage the Elephant, Wiz Khalifa, and Kygo. In 2017, the concert series, renamed Snow Fest, was headlined by performances by Major Lazer, Tiësto, Marshmello, and Michael Franti & Spearhead. The 2018 Snow Fest featured Kaskade, Post Malone, Marshmello, Big Boi, The Cool Kids, Tribal Seeds, Steve Angello and Nelly. Marshmello returned for a performance in 2019.
