= Sweet 75 (album) =

Studio album by Sweet 75
- Released: August 26, 1997
- Recorded: 1997
- Studio: A&M Studios; (West Hollywood, California)
- Genre: Alternative rock
- Length: 47:18
- Label: DGC
- Producer: Paul Fox

Singles from Sweet 75
- 1. "Lay Me Down" Released: 1997

Professional ratings
Review scores
Source	Rating
Allmusic	3/5 stars
NME	3/10
Uncut	2/5 stars

Sweet 75 is the only studio album by alternative rock band Sweet 75, released on August 26, 1997, through DGC.

== Track listing ==
All songs composed by Yva Las Vegass and Krist Novoselic, except where noted.

1. "Fetch" (Yva Las Vegas) – 3:40
2. "Lay Me Down" (Yva Las Vegas) – 3:28
3. "Bite My Hand" – 2:25
4. "Red Dress" (Yva Las Vegas) – 3:19
5. "La Vida" (Yva Las Vegas) – 3:38
6. "Six Years" – 3:43
7. "Take Another Stab" – 5:13
8. "Poor Kitty" – 2:41
9. "Ode to Dolly" – 2:51
10. "Dogs" (Krist Novoselic) – 3:34
11. "Cantos de Pilon" (traditional) – 2:36
12. "Nothing" – 5:33
13. "Japan Trees" – 2:28
14. "Oral Health" – 4:49

== Personnel ==
- Yva Las Vegas – vocals; bass (tracks 1–3, 6–9, 12–14), guitar (tracks 4, 5, 10, 11), cuatro (track 5)
- Krist Novoselic – guitar (tracks 1–3, 6–9, 12–14), bass (tracks 4, 5, 10), accordion (track 11)
- William Rieflin – percussion (tracks 1, 3–10, 12–14), piano (track 11)
- Paul Fox – Mellotron (tracks 1, 4), orchestron (track 2), folding field organ (track 14)
- Adam Wade – percussion (track 2)
- Greg Adams – trumpet (tracks 5, 10), horn arrangement (tracks 5, 10)
- Chuck Findley – trumpet (tracks 5, 10)
- Nick Lane – trombone (tracks 5, 10)
- Brandon Fields – saxophone (tracks 5, 10)
- Herb Alpert – trumpet solo (track 5)
- Arisa Romero – additional vocals (track 5)
- Peter Buck – mandolin (track 11)
