= Sweet 75 =

American rock band (1994–2000)

- Krist Novoselic and Yva Las Vegass in 1997

Background information
- Genres: Alternative rock
- Years active: 1994–2000
- Label: DGC
- Past members: Krist Novoselic; Yva Las Vegass; Bobi Lore; Bill Rieflin; Adam Wade; Gina Mainwal

Sweet 75 was a band formed by Krist Novoselic in 1994 after the break-up of Nirvana. The band released one self-titled album before splitting up in 2000.

== History ==
Krist Novoselic formed Sweet 75 after Nirvana's 1994 break-up, along with Venezuelan-born street singer Yva Las Vegass, whom he met after his wife hired her to sing at his birthday party. Novoselic originally planned to produce an album for the singer but after writing songs together, they decided to form Sweet 75, the name taken from a poem by Theodore Roethke. With Bobi Lore added on drums, they performed a few live shows in 1995 and signed to Geffen Records. In 1996, a bootleg of a November 17, 1995, live show was released by the record company Sea Monkey called Trucked Up Fuckstop. Lore was replaced by former Ministry drummer Bill Rieflin before the band recorded their self-titled debut album, which included guest performances from Peter Buck of R.E.M., Sky Cries Mary's Anisa Romero, and Herb Alpert. The album was not released until 1997, after a tour with Dinosaur Jr., by which time Rieflin had been replaced by former Shudder to Think drummer Adam Wade. At the time, the record didn't make much impression, either commercially or critically. The album was described as blending "indie-rock with heavy rock, Mexican music, lounge and country". In addition, a single of the song "Lay Me Down" was released in Australia. It contained the album tracks "Lay Me Down" and "La Vida", and a previously unreleased song called "Soap Zone". Wade left in October 1997, and the group disbanded in early 1998. They reformed later that year, with Rieflin back on drums, and recorded demos for a second album, but Novoselic and Rieflin began spending more time on their other project, Sunshine Cake, with Romero, and in mid-1999 the band again split up. Further work on the second album in 2000 was reported, but by August that year the band had split up for good, citing "creative differences".

== Band members ==
- Krist Novoselic – guitar, bass, accordion
- Yva Las Vegass – bass, guitar, vocals
- Bobi Lore – drums
- Bill Rieflin – drums
- Adam Wade – drums
- Gina Mainwal – drums

== Discography ==
=== Albums ===
- Sweet 75 (1997, DGC)

=== Singles ===
- "Lay Me Down" (1997)
