= False Hopes (Dessa EP) =

EP by Dessa
- Released: 2005
- Genres: Hip-hop; alternative hip-hop
- Length: 15:09
- Label: Doomtree Records
- Producers: Lazerbeak; Tom Servo; Paper Tiger; Butcher's Butcher

Dessa chronology
False Hopes (2005)	A Badly Broken Code (2010)

False Hopes is the debut EP by Dessa, a member of Minneapolis indie hip-hop collective Doomtree. It was released on Doomtree Records in 2005.

In a 2008 interview with The A.V. Club, Dessa said, "I felt a little more confident in my ability, and I knew that some people in Minneapolis had liked the first project, so I felt a little more confident in my attack."

== Track listing ==
No.	Title	Producer(s)	Length
1.	"Mineshaft" (featuring Jessy Greene on violin)	Lazerbeak	2:55
2.	"Everything Floats" (featuring Cecil Otter on vocals)	Tom Servo	2:45
3.	"Press On" (featuring Sims on vocals)	Lazerbeak	2:16
4.	"551"	Paper Tiger	3:41
5.	"Kites"	Butcher's Butcher	3:32
