= Sound City Players =

Supergroup formed by Dave Grohl (2012–2013)

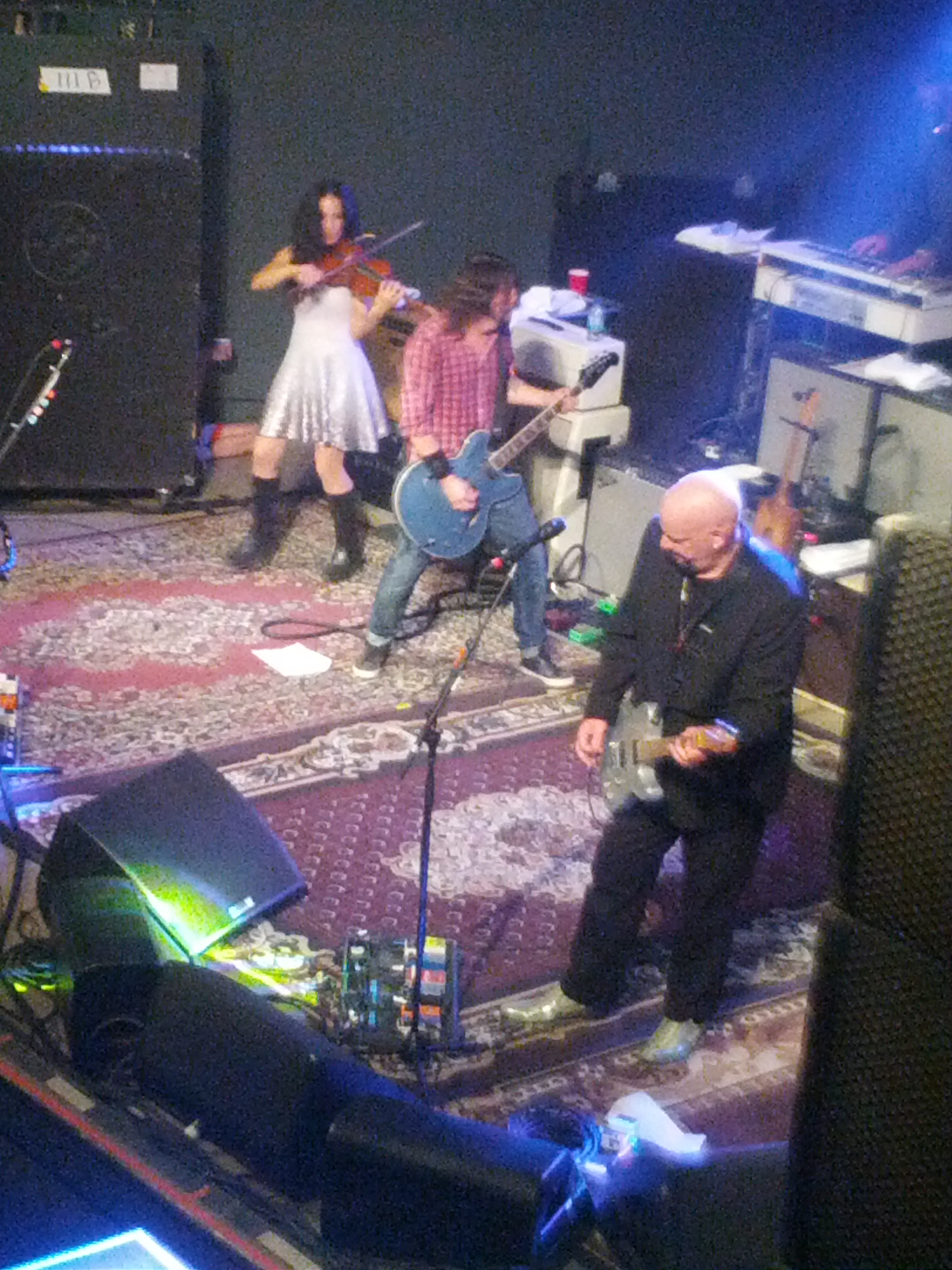
- Sound City Players play their last gig at SXSW, Austin, Texas

Background information
- Origin: Los Angeles, California
- Genres: Alternative rock
- Years active: 2012–2013
- Label: RCA
- Members: Dave Grohl (See: other members)

The Sound City Players were a supergroup formed by ex-Nirvana drummer and Foo Fighters guitarist and lead-singer Dave Grohl. In addition to Grohl, members included ex-Nirvana bassist Krist Novoselic, Stone Sour's and Slipknot's Corey Taylor, Nine Inch Nails' Trent Reznor, Josh Homme from Queens of the Stone Age, Rick Nielsen from Cheap Trick, Rick Springfield, Stevie Nicks, Alain Johannes, Paul McCartney, and many more.

== History ==
The first public word of Sound City was when Paul McCartney performed with the surviving members of Nirvana: Grohl, Novoselic and Smear live at the 12-12-12: The Concert for Sandy Relief in New York. Together they premiered the collaborative song "Cut Me Some Slack". Grohl then revealed his plans for the Sound City film and soundtrack. McCartney and the surviving members of Nirvana performed the song a second time the following week on Saturday Night Live.

Grohl then formed the Sound City Players with many of the musicians who appeared in his film Sound City about the closing of, (but later re-opened) Sound City Studios in Van Nuys, California. Their debut was at the Sundance Film Festival's Park City Live on January 18, 2013.

Grohl and seven other band members, including Nicks on lead vocals, appeared on Late Night with David Letterman on February 14, 2013. The Sound City Players appeared on Jimmy Kimmel Live on March 5, 2013 and on Ellen on March 7, 2013. Grohl promised that their final show was the concert at the SXSW music festival on March 14, 2013.

== Members ==
Varying musicians performed the live shows as the Sound City Players. These musicians included:

- Dave Grohl
- Josh Homme
- Trent Reznor
- Krist Novoselic
- Pat Smear
- Taylor Hawkins
- Alain Johannes
- Nate Mendel
- Chris Shiflett
- Rami Jaffee
- Jessy Greene
- Chris Goss
- Jim Keltner
- Lee Ving
- Stevie Nicks
- Rick Nielsen
- Rick Springfield
- Corey Taylor
- Brad Wilk
- Robert Levon Been
- Peter Hayes

== Discography ==
- Sound City: Real to Reel (2013)
