= Sessions 1981–83 =

Compilation album by Void
- Released: 2011
- Recorded: 1981–1983
- Genre: Hardcore punk, thrashcore
- Length: 36:13
- Label: Dischord
- Producer: Ian MacKaye, Don Zientara

Void chronology
Faith/Void Split (1982)	Sessions 1981–83 (2011)

Sessions 1981–83 is an album by hardcore punk band Void. It was released in 2011. The album compiles three sessions as well as a live performance. 29 of the 34 songs on the album had not been previously released, officially.

== Background ==
The tapes that the album were remastered from were discovered by Ian MacKaye as he was organizing Dischord's collection. The first 20 tracks were recorded in November 1981 at Hit and Run Studios in Rockville, Maryland and were used by the band as a demo tape. Tracks 21–30 were recorded at Inner Ear Studios in December 1981; tracks 21, 22, and 23 would be used in the Flex Your Head label album. 31 & 32 two were recorded in June 1982 during the recordings for the Faith/Void split album, again at Inner Ear studios. The final two tracks are live recordings of the band during the end stages of their existence in late 1983.

== Reception ==
The album did not receive much attention, but the reviews that it did receive were very positive. MetalSucks reviewer Mike Gitter declared it the reissue of the year, remarking that it was "[t]he sound of music being played with such fury that it falls apart only to put itself back together on the next song some 30 seconds later." Meanwhile, Pitchfork's review was also quite positive, but somewhat more subdued; feeling that the recordings were not as good as those from their split and that the release removed some of the band's mystery.

== Track listing ==
1. "Void"
2. "War Hero"
3. "Go South"
4. "Condensed Flesh"
5. "Controller/Revolt"
6. "Dehumanized"
7. "Suburbs Suck"
8. "Organized Sports/Who the Fuck Are You"
9. "Annoyed"
10. "Don't Wanna Be Like You"
11. "Black, Jewish, and Poor"
12. "Please Give Us a Chance"
13. "Protect And Serve"
14. "Time To Die"
15. "Self-Defense"
16. "Draft Me Please"
17. "Authority"
18. "All White Neighborhood"
19. "Halfway Boys"
20. "Wasted Party"
21. "Dehumanized"
22. "Authority"
23. "My Rules"
24. "Get Out of My Way"
25. "Condensed Flesh"
26. "Organized Sports/Annoyed"
27. "Controller/Revolt"
28. "Black, Jewish, And Poor"
29. "War Hero"
30. "Go South"
31. "Dehumanized"
32. "Get Out Of My Way
33. "Explode"
34. "My Rules"

== Personnel ==
Void

- Bubba Dupree – guitar
- Sean Finnegan – drums
- Chris Stover – bass
- John Weiffenbach – vocals

Production

- Steve Carr – recording (tracks 1–20)
- Don Zientara – recording (tracks 20–32), production
- Tom Lyle – recording (tracks 33, 34)
- Ian MacKaye – production
