= Jessy Greene =

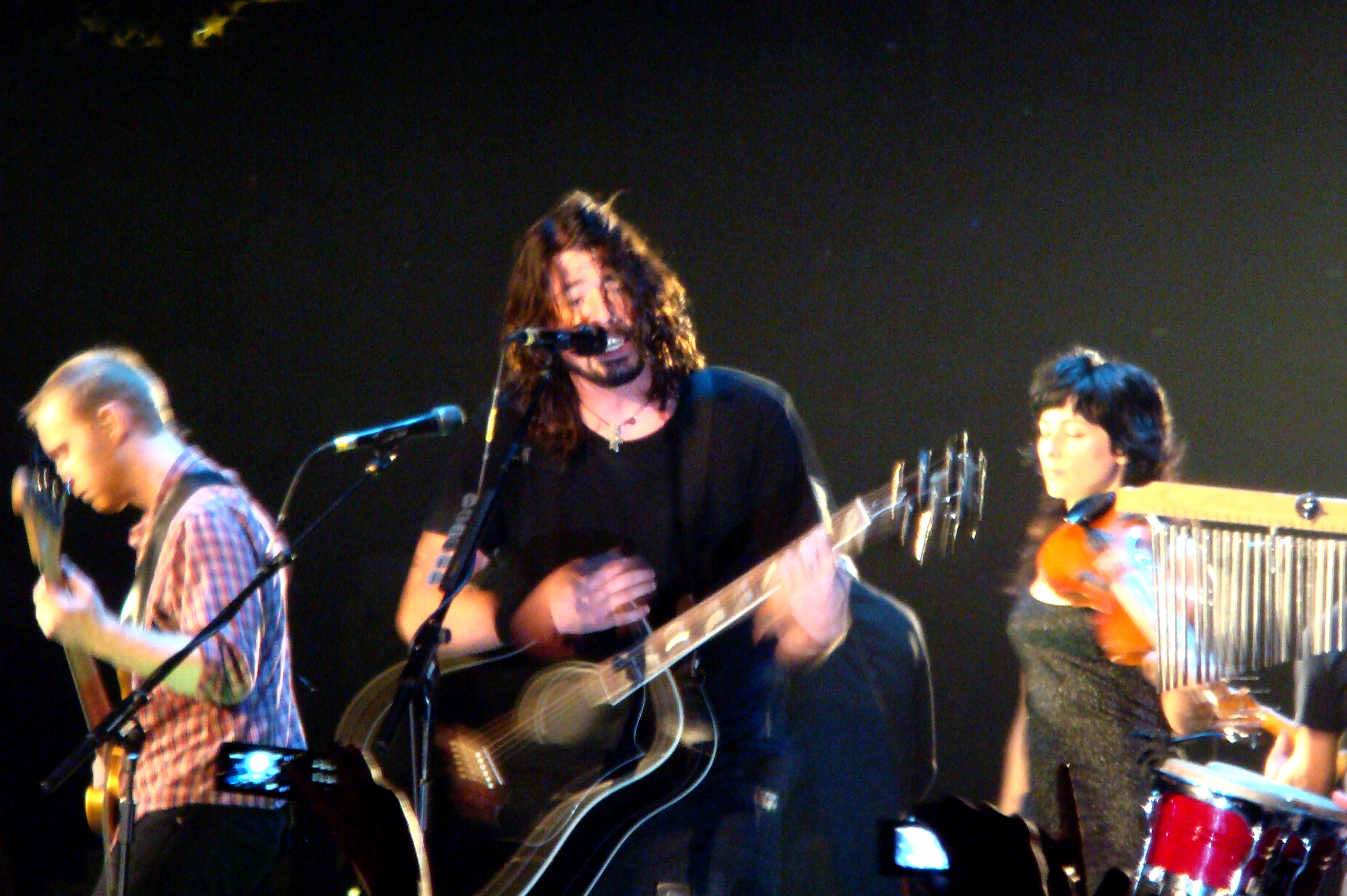
- Jessy Greene (right) with the Foo Fighters

Background information
- Born: Sheffield, Massachusetts, U.S.
- Occupation: Musician
- Years active: 1995–present
- Website: www.jessygreenemusic.com

Jessy Greene is an American violinist, cellist and vocalist. She is a former member of Geraldine Fibbers and the Jayhawks.

== Career ==
A native of Sheffield in western Massachusetts, Greene started playing the violin at the age of four. During high school, she took a break from the instrument to play guitar in a rock band before deciding to play violin in more contemporary styles.

Later, she got a degree from UCLA in ethnomusicology, and joined the Peter Himmelman "Skin" tour, playing violin and singing backup. Upon returning to Los Angeles, Greene joined the Geraldine Fibbers, with whom she recorded two albums. In 1997, she moved to Minneapolis, joining the Jayhawks. In Minnesota, Greene played with local projects and recorded two solo albums.

Greene has played with a number of artists including Golden Smog, Wilco, RZA, Post Malone, JoAnna James, Atmosphere, Joseph Arthur, Soul Asylum and Dessa. Two of the most prominent are the Foo Fighters, which Greene was introduced through keyboardist Rami Jaffee and went on to take part in one tour and songs on two albums, Wasting Light and Concrete and Gold; and Pink, whom she first joined as part of a 10-piece string section on American Music Awards in 2008, and went on to appear in all of Pink's tours starting with the Funhouse Tour in 2009. Greene played at Hardly Strictly Bluegrass Festival as part of Exene's band the California Mothership in 2010, and also recorded and toured with Ben Harper, Joseph Arthur and Dhani Harrison in their band Fistful of Mercy.

Her song "Time Bomb" was featured at the end of the Burn Notice season 2 finale called "Lesser Evil".

== Discography ==
=== Albums ===
- Blue Sky (2002)
- A Demon & Her Lovers (2006)

=== Guest appearances ===
- Wilco - "The Lonely 1" from Being There (1996)
- Wilco - "Jesus, Etc." from Yankee Hotel Foxtrot (2002)
- Dosh - "Song for Zelbert Moore" from Dosh (2002)
- Dessa - "Mineshaft" from False Hopes (2005)
- Atmosphere - "Little Man" from You Can't Imagine How Much Fun We're Having (2005)
- Dessa - "Mineshaft II" from A Badly Broken Code (2010)
- Foo Fighters - Wasting Light (2011)
- Ben Harper - By My Side (2012)
- Sound City - Real to Reel (2013)
- Joseph Arthur - The Ballad of Boogie Christ (2013)
- Ghost - "If You Have Ghosts" from If You Have Ghost (2013)
- Dessa - The Hamilton Mixtape (2016)
- Foo Fighters - Concrete and Gold (2017)
