= Castor, the Twin =

2011 album by Dessa

Studio album by Dessa
- Released: October 4, 2011
- Genres: Hip-hop; alternative hip-hop
- Length: 41:20
- Label: Doomtree Records

Dessa chronology
A Badly Broken Code (2010)	Castor, the Twin (2011)	Parts of Speech (2013)

Professional ratings
Review scores
Source	Rating
Metalorgie.com	16/20
Mezzic	8.3/10
No Ripcord	8/10 stars
Punknews.org	3/5 stars

Castor, the Twin is the second studio album by Dessa, a member of Minneapolis indie hip-hop collective Doomtree. It was released by Doomtree Records in 2011.

The album features new arrangements of her previously released songs. The original production has been replaced with live instrumentation on piano, vibraphone, mandolin, viola, double bass and timpani.

The final track "The Beekeeper" is an advance single from Dessa's 2013 album Parts of Speech.

== Background ==
The album was conceived during Into the Spin tour, Dessa's first tour with the live trio. The trio consisted of Dustin Kiel on guitar and keys, Sean McPherson on bass and Joey Van Phillips on drums. Audiences responded so well to their inventive re-arrangements, and the nuance of their performances, that the new treatments seemed to warrant capturing.

In an interview with NPR, Dessa talked about the process. "In making this new record, I thought, I had songs that played really differently when they were performed with live instrumentation [...] So we have grand piano, mandolin and stuff that you would associate more readily with an orchestral vibe."

== Title ==
The album title refers to the twin brothers Castor and Pollux from Greek and Roman mythology. Their father was a god, their mother human. Consequently, Castor was born human, while Pollux immortal. Castor is the milder of the two.

Dessa said, "To me, many of the songs on Castor are the more organic 'twins' to the versions that were recorded for previous, highly produced projects like A Badly Broken Code or Paper Tiger's Made Like Us. There's a human quality to these recordings that I hoped to convey in the title."

== Reception ==
In an interview with The Indie Spiritualist, Dessa talked about the responses. "In the end, I was heartened by the responses of listeners, who seemed to really get and appreciate the musical differences between A Badly Broken Code and the more organic and orchestral interpretations."

== Track listing ==
No.	Title	Length
1.	"551"	4:00
2.	"Kites"	3:59
3.	"Mineshaft"	4:37
4.	"The Chaconne"	4:36
5.	"Into The Spin"	2:23
6.	"Dixon's Girl"	3:17
7.	"The Crow"	3:13
8.	"Alibi"	3:39
9.	"Palace"	3:12
10.	"Mineshaft 2"	4:11
11.	"The Beekeeper"	4:06

== Charts ==
Chart	Peak position
US Heatseekers Albums (Billboard)	8
US Independent Albums (Billboard)	36
US Top R&B/Hip-Hop Albums (Billboard)	26
US Rap Albums (Billboard)	18
