= Krist Novoselic =

American rock musician (born 1965)

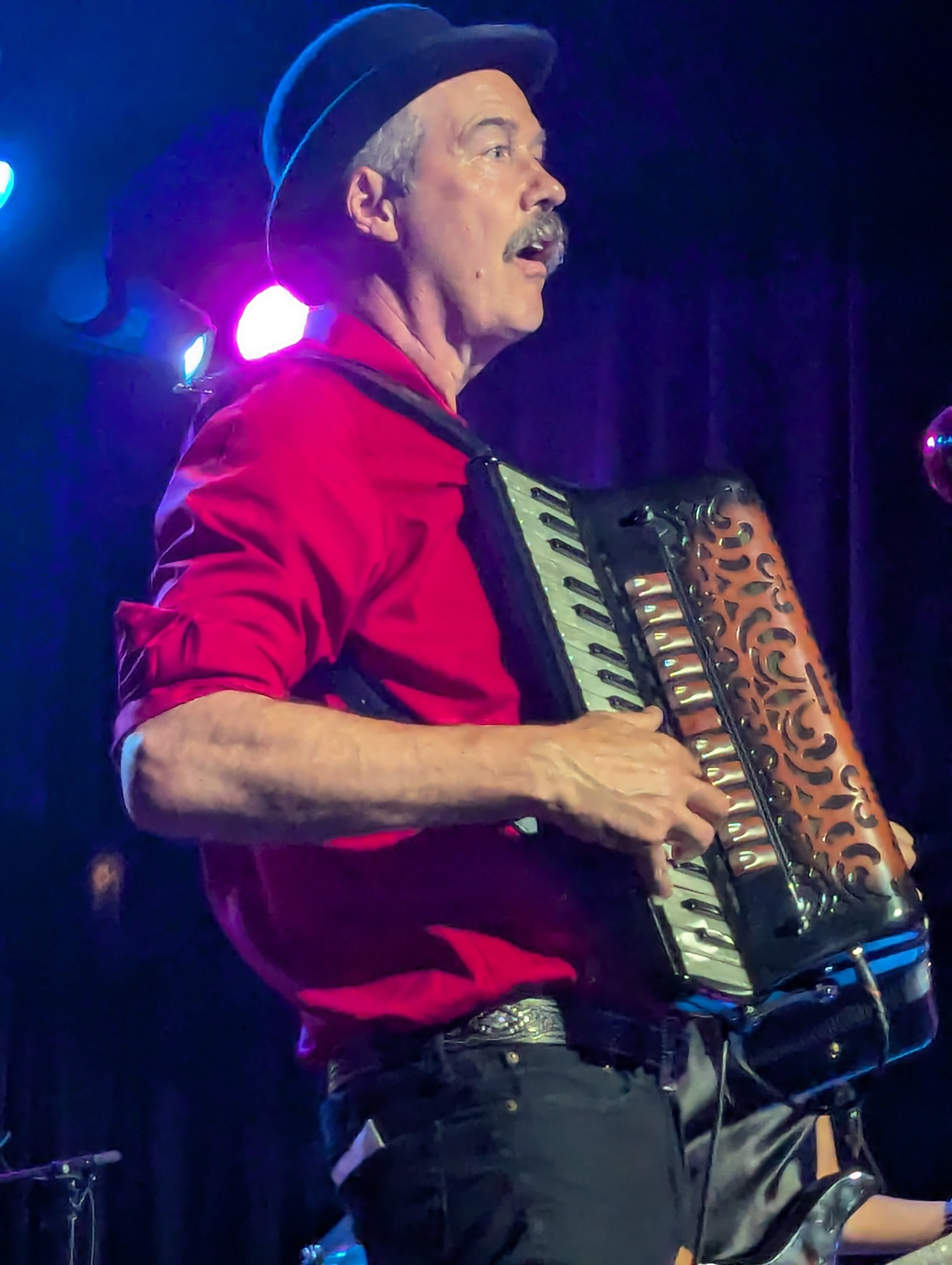
- Novoselic in 2024
- Born: Krist Anthony Novoselic; May 16, 1965 (age 61); Compton, California, U.S.
- Occupations: Musician; politician; activist
- Years active: 1987–present
- Political party: Forward (2023–2024); Cascade (2024–present)
- Spouse: Shelli Hyrkas (m. 1989; div. 1999) Darbury Stenderu (m. 2004)
- Children: 2
- Musical career
- Genres: Grunge; hard rock; heavy metal; alternative rock; punk rock; hardcore punk; post-punk; sludge metal; cowpunk
- Instruments: Bass guitar; vocals; guitar; accordion
- Member of: 3rd Secret
- Formerly of: Nirvana; Sweet 75; The No WTO Combo; Flipper; Eyes Adrift; Sound City Players; Super Earth; Giants in the Trees

Krist Anthony Novoselic (/ˌnoʊvəˈsɛlɪtʃ/; born May 16, 1965) is an American musician, politician, and activist. Novoselic co-founded and played bass on every album for the rock band Nirvana.

Novoselic and Kurt Cobain formed the band Nirvana in 1987, soon recruiting drummer Aaron Burckhard, who was the drummer of the group until October 1987. Through the late 1980s, Nirvana established themselves as part of the Seattle grunge scene, releasing three albums between 1989 and 1993. Nirvana abruptly ended in 1994 following the death of Kurt Cobain. Novoselic has been inducted into the Rock and Roll Hall of Fame as a member of Nirvana, and has also received a Grammy Lifetime Achievement Award as a member of the band.

After Nirvana disbanded, Novoselic formed Sweet 75 in 1995 and Eyes Adrift in 2002, releasing one album with each band. From 2006 to 2009, he played in the punk rock band Flipper. In 2011, he contributed bass and accordion to the song "I Should Have Known" on the Foo Fighters' studio album Wasting Light. From 2017 to 2020, he played bass and accordion for the band Giants in the Trees.

Outside of music, Novoselic has been active politically. From 2007 through 2010, he wrote a weekly column on music and politics for the Seattle Weekly website. Novoselic has served on the board of the electoral reform organization FairVote and has served as its chair. In 2020, he became board chair of Zócalo Public Square. He joined the Forward Party in 2023 and became the party's leader in Washington after the resignation of Chris Vance. In 2024, he founded the Cascade Party of Washington.

== Early life ==
Krist Anthony Novoselic was born in Compton, California, on May 16, 1965, the son of Croatian immigrants Kristo Novaselić and Marija Mustać. Kristo was a native of Veli Iž on the island of Iž, while Marija originates from Privlaka. The original Croatian surname of Novaselić was mistakenly changed to Novoselic by a clerk when Kristo was applying for a passport to go to America. Novoselic lived in Compton for one year before his parents moved to the ethnically Croatian Los Angeles neighborhood of San Pedro. His first language is Croatian. He has a younger brother and a younger sister. In 1979, his family relocated to Aberdeen, Washington. In 1980, his parents sent him to live with relatives in Zadar, Croatia, Yugoslavia. He returned to Aberdeen in 1981. His earliest memory of listening to music is listening to Chuck Berry with his father. Growing up, he had a severe underbite, for which he underwent corrective surgery.

Novoselic was interested in bands such as Led Zeppelin, Black Sabbath, The Who, Van Halen, Devo, and Aerosmith. He also enjoyed listening to Yugoslavian bands such as Zabranjeno Pušenje, Prljavo kazalište and Azra. He became interested in punk rock, and discovered bands such as the Sex Pistols and the Ramones while he resided in Croatia. He has cited Paul McCartney, Geezer Butler, John Entwistle, and Gene Simmons as fundamental influences of his bass playing.

Novoselic's brother Robert introduced him to his friend Kurt Cobain, who had noticed loud music coming from upstairs in the Novoselic household. Robert told Cobain that it was his older brother, who listened to punk rock. Cobain eventually befriended the older Novoselic, as the pair had similar musical tastes, including a fondness for local band Melvins. The two had several mutual friends and began hanging out shortly thereafter. Krist attended Aberdeen High School while Kurt attended high school in nearby Montesano. At one point, Cobain gave Novoselic a demo tape of his former band Fecal Matter, and asked him to form a band together. After several months, Novoselic finally listened to the tape, liked it, and agreed to start a band with Cobain. After high school, Novoselic worked as a painter and decorator but was eventually laid off.

== Career ==
=== Nirvana (1987–1994) ===
Cobain and Novoselic's first band lasted barely a few weeks before it disbanded, leaving the pair to move on. However, the duo eventually discovered that the Melvins could pull $80 a night for one show. Inspired, Cobain and Novoselic started a Creedence Clearwater Revival cover band, in which Cobain played drums, and Novoselic sang and played guitar. That band was short-lived as well. Some months later, Cobain and Novoselic met drummer Aaron Burckhard. While the new band never used the name, it was the first incarnation of Nirvana.

Burckhard lasted only a few months, and Melvins' drummer Dale Crover filled in until Novoselic and Cobain met Chad Channing. The trio recorded their debut album Bleach, released in 1989. Channing left the band in 1990 and was briefly replaced by Crover and Mudhoney drummer Dan Peters. Novoselic contributed to the writing of various songs, providing ideas for Cobain.

Later in 1990, Melvins' singer-guitarist Buzz Osborne encouraged Novoselic and Cobain to check out a punk band called Scream. The pair were impressed by their drummer, Dave Grohl. A few weeks later, Scream disbanded, and Grohl placed a call to Osborne for advice. Osborne gave him Novoselic's phone number, and Novoselic invited Grohl up to Seattle (from San Francisco, where Scream broke up). Grohl passed the audition and joined Nirvana. Grohl was Nirvana's fifth and final drummer. Novoselic spent the following months with Nirvana traveling to various labels as the band shopped for a deal, eventually signing with DGC Records.

In the spring of 1991, the band entered Sound City Studios in Los Angeles to record Nevermind. Novoselic helped write the song "Polly". Upon its release, Nevermind (1991) exceeded all expectations and became a worldwide commercial success. Nevermind had launched the band as a worldwide phenomenon with their hit single "Smells Like Teen Spirit".

At the 1992 MTV Video Music Awards, Nirvana would win awards for Best New Artist in a Video and Best Alternative Video for "Smells Like Teen Spirit." At the show, Nirvana performed "Lithium". Near the end of this performance, Novoselic threw his bass guitar in the air to perform a "Bass Toss." He failed to catch it, later stating that he misjudged the height; he further stated that he "faked like he was knocked out." Musician Brian May ran to give him medical attention; he did not suffer any injuries.

In 1992, Nirvana released a compilation album named Incesticide. Novoselic helped write lyrics for the songs "Dive", "Hairspray Queen", and "Aneurysm" on the album. This album was produced by a joint venture between DGC and Sub Pop.

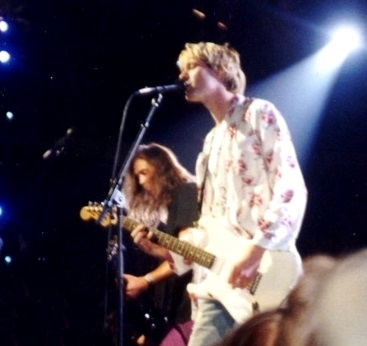
Novoselic (left) playing bass alongside singer Kurt Cobain (right) in 1992

During Nirvana's 1992 Reading concert, Novoselic sang Oakland punk band Fang's "The Money Will Roll Right In" with Cobain. Novoselic was an occasional vocalist and backing vocalist in Nirvana, occasionally singing "Scoff" and "Rape Me" at live shows. Novoselic stated that "I kind of discovered my voice for the first time, and the more I did it, the better it got."

In September 1993, Nirvana's third album In Utero, debuted at number one on the Billboard 200. However, the recording sessions mixed by Steve Albini were criticized by the band members, saying some songs "didn't sound perfect", as well as the band agreeing that Novoselic's bass lines sounded "too low". In Utero sold 3.5 million copies in the United States. In November of that year, Nirvana performed on MTV Unplugged with Lori Goldston playing cello, the introduction of guitarist Pat Smear, and Novoselic playing acoustic bass guitar, accordion, and acoustic rhythm guitar. This live performance was released a year later as an album, named MTV Unplugged in New York, which earned a Grammy Award for Best Alternative Music Performance.

Prior to their 1994 European tour, the band scheduled session time at Robert Lang Studios in Seattle to work on demos. For most of the three-day session, Cobain was absent, so Novoselic and Grohl worked on demos of their own songs. The duo completed several songs, including "Exhausted", "Big Me", "February Stars", and "Butterflies". On the third day of the session, Cobain finally arrived. The song "You Know You're Right" was the band's final studio recording.

Nirvana ended abruptly in April 1994 following Cobain's suicide. For most of the rest of that year, Novoselic retreated from the spotlight. One of a few public appearances came that September at the MTV Video Music Awards, where the video for Nirvana's "Heart-Shaped Box" was awarded Best Alternative Video. Novoselic took the opportunity to pay tribute to Cobain.

On April 10, 2014, Novoselic was inducted into the Rock and Roll Hall of Fame as a member of Nirvana. Novoselic spoke at the band's induction ceremony. On February 4, 2023, Nirvana received a Grammy Lifetime Achievement Award; Novoselic was on hand, along with Dave Grohl and Pat Smear, to receive the award.

=== Post-Nirvana (1995–present) ===
After Cobain's death, Novoselic continued to dabble in musical endeavors. He co-founded the band Sweet 75 with Venezuelan musician Yva Las Vegass in 1995, releasing a single self-titled album in 1997. In 1996, Novoselic joined singer Johnny Cash, guitarist Kim Thayil of Soundgarden and drummer Sean Kinney of Alice in Chains to record a cover of Willie Nelson's "Time of the Preacher", for the tribute album Twisted Willie, released in January 1996. In 1998, Novoselic directed his first movie, L7: The Beauty Process, a pseudo-documentary that utilizes concert footage taped in 1997 in three American cities. In 1999, he joined Jello Biafra and Soundgarden guitarist Kim Thayil in the No WTO Combo.

In 2002, Novoselic performed uncredited background vocals on Foo Fighters' song "Walking a Line", written as a tribute to Cobain, during the One by One album sessions. The track is included on the One by One bonus DVD, as well as being a bonus track to the album. He then joined former Meat Puppets front man Curt Kirkwood and former Sublime drummer Bud Gaugh to form Eyes Adrift. In Australia, there was another group called Eyes Adrift, and rather than pay to license that name, the trio called the band and album "Bud, Curt & Krist" in this nation. Eyes Adrift released a self-titled album with twelve songs, with the Japanese version including two extras. Eyes Adrift was the first official release in Novoselic's career where he sang lead vocals, singing lead on "Inquiring Minds", "Dottie Dawn & Julie Jewel" and "Pasted". They also released a single titled "Alaska". He also took a highly active role in the songwriting process, co-writing several songs with Kirkwood. They toured mostly around the United States. The group disbanded in 2003.

Following the end of Eyes Adrift, Novoselic announced that he was quitting the music business, noting that he disliked the process of building up publicity for new records. However, in 2005, Novoselic had occasionally worked on music for a possible solo album, noting, "Right now, I'm just doing it for myself, and that's what it's all about."

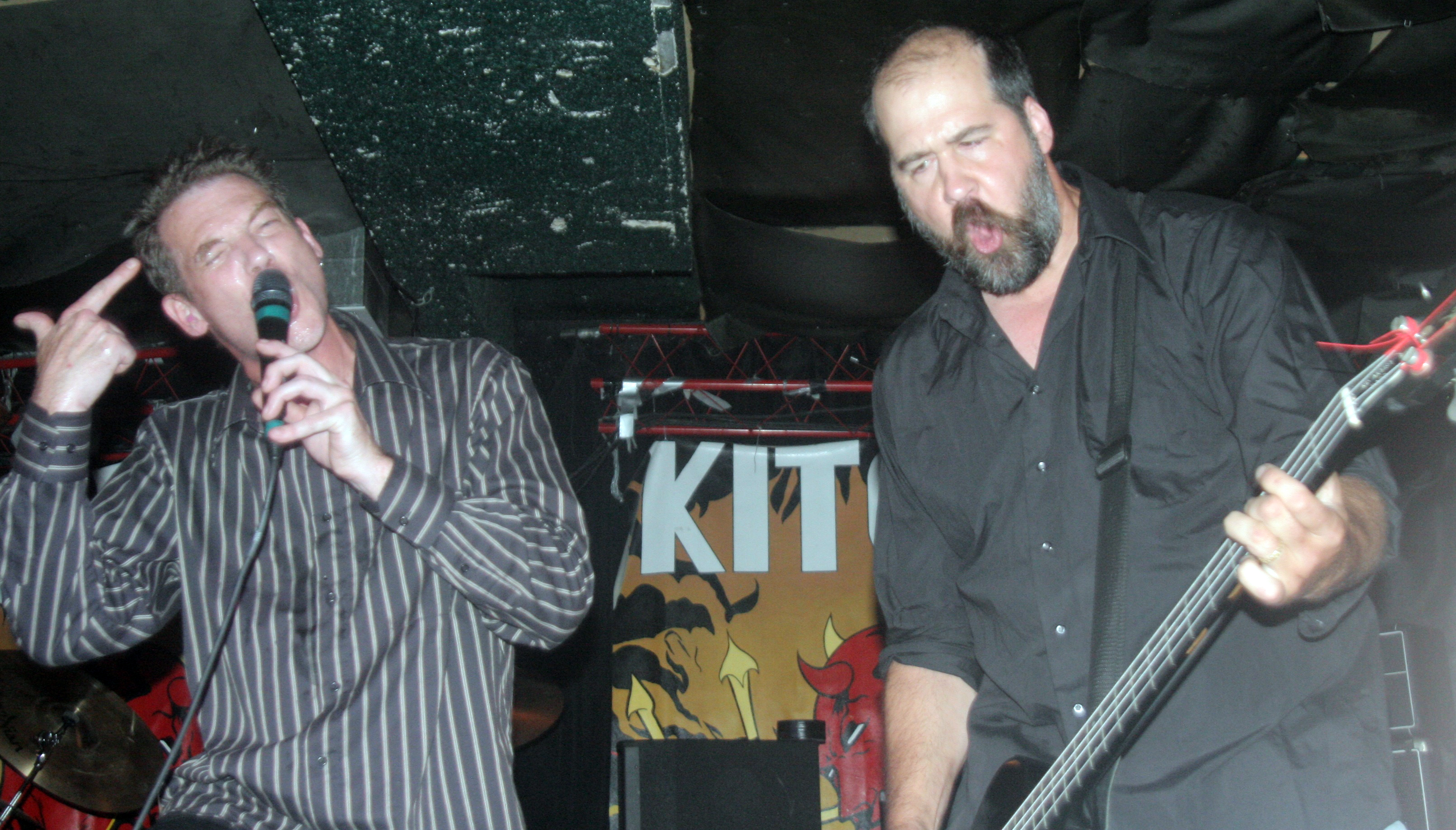
Bruce Loose and Krist Novoselic perform in the band Flipper in Seattle in 2008.

In November 2006, it was announced that Novoselic would join Flipper, replacing Bruno DeSmartas on bass, for a tour of the United Kingdom and Ireland. He was a full-time member of the band and had been working on their new album. On September 22, 2008, because of responsibilities at home, Novoselic announced his departure from the band. As a result, the band canceled the remainder of the tour. Rachel Thoele then replaced Novoselic.

In 2009, Novoselic played a newspaper vendor in the movie World's Greatest Dad starring Robin Williams. In October 2010, Dave Grohl, former Nirvana bandmate of Novoselic, announced live on BBC radio, that Novoselic would be joining Foo Fighters as a bassist and accordionist on their next album, Wasting Light, which was released in 2011. Novoselic also played bass on children's music artist Caspar Babypants' 2010 album This Is Fun!, for a cover of the Nirvana song "Sliver". In 2011, he performed "On a Plain" and "Sliver" with the band at the Nevermind 20th anniversary celebration in Seattle.

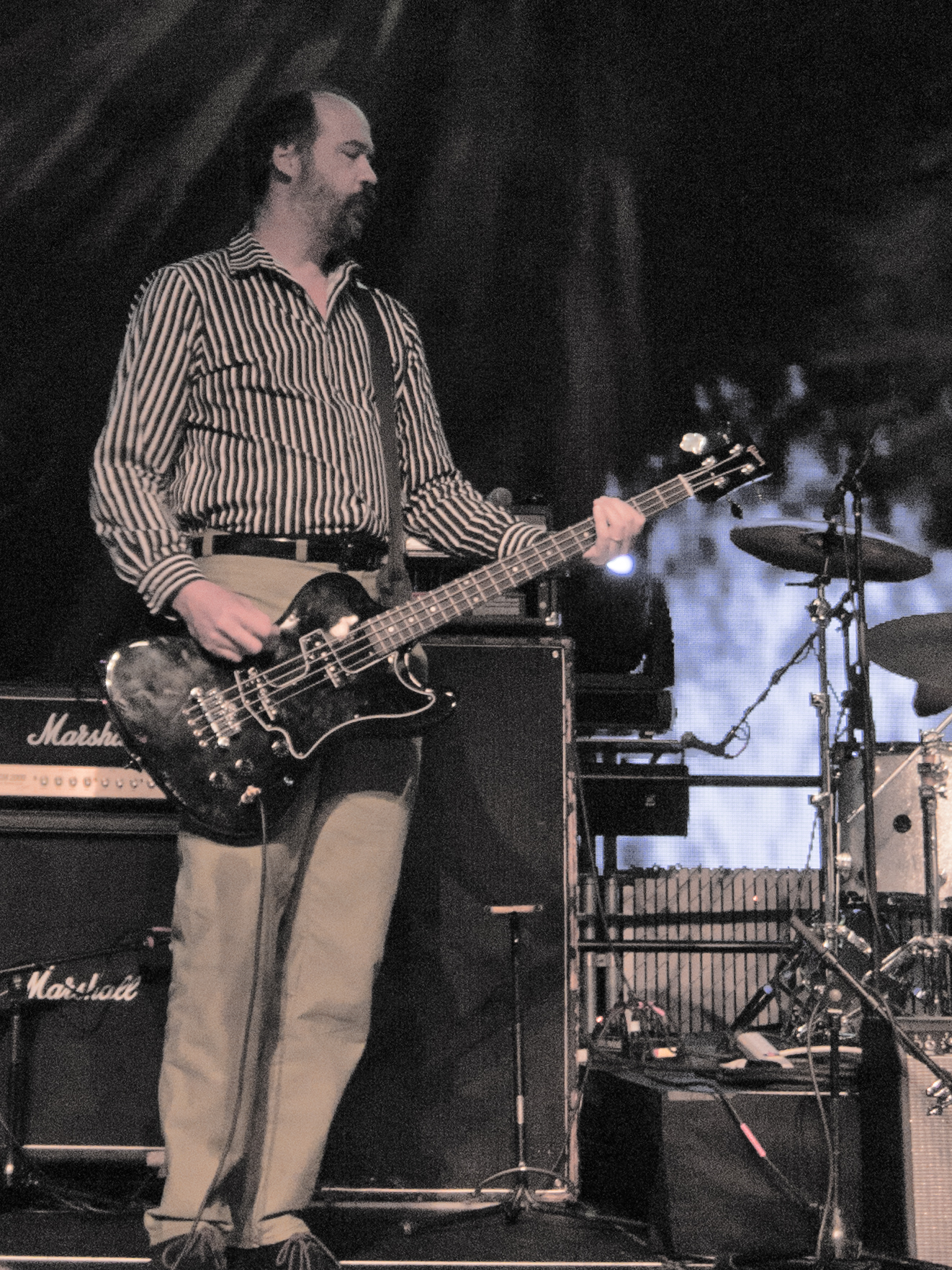
Novoselic performing in 2011

In 2012, Novoselic and Grohl partnered with Paul McCartney on the song "Cut Me Some Slack", which was composed specially for the soundtrack of the documentary Sound City, directed by Grohl. The song was first shown on December 12, 2012, at the 12-12-12 festival, which brought together music stars for the victims of Hurricane Sandy in New York. The song was received well by critics. Allmusic called it a "tune with an immediate hook [and] melody". The song won the Grammy award for Best Rock Song in 2014. The partnership was referred to as "Sirvana" by Novoselic, referring to "Sir Paul McCartney".

On April 17, 2016, Novoselic performed "Helter Skelter" with McCartney in Seattle as part of the One on One tour. In November 2016, Novoselic confirmed that he was in the process of writing new music. Novoselic then founded the band Giants in the Trees in 2017, featuring band members Jillian Raye, Erik Friend and Ray Prestegard. He also played in the band Filthy Friends, contributing bass and accordion on their debut album Invitation. He also collaborates with lepidopterist and author Robert Michael Pyle with the musical project Butterfly Launches from Spar Pole. In late July 2017, Giants in the Trees released their first song, "Sasquatch", which features a music video Novoselic joked as "costing over 2 million U.S. dollars to produce". Giants in the Trees' first album was released in late 2017. Giants In The Trees' second album, Volume 2, was released in 2019. In 2020, Giants in the Trees dissolved, with Novoselic attributing the dissolution to COVID-19.

In late 2021, Novoselic worked with musicians such as Soundgarden's Kim Thayil, alongside Matt Cameron, with production being handled by Jack Endino, as a new band, called 3rd Secret. A self-titled album was released in April 2022, with eleven songs recorded at The Bait Shop in Ballard, Washington, as well as Novoselic's home, on which Novoselic contributed acoustic guitar, accordion, and bass. In June 2023, 3rd Secret released their second studio album The 2nd 3rd Secret featuring Novoselic.

=== Performance and recording with Foo Fighters ===
In 1994, Grohl founded a new band, Foo Fighters. Grohl and his bandmates decided against Novoselic joining; Grohl said it would have felt "really natural" for them to work together again, but would have been uncomfortable for the other band members and placed more pressure on Grohl.

During the encore of the Foo Fighters' show on August 29, 1997, at Memorial Stadium as part of the Bumbershoot festival, Novoselic played bass on covers of "Purple Rain" and "Communication Breakdown". In January 2002, Novoselic performed backing vocals for a non-album Foo Fighters track titled "Walking a Line", later released on a special edition of their album One by One.

During the encore of Foo Fighters' secret show at Paladino's in Tarzana, California on December 22, 2010, the band, with Grohl on drums, was joined onstage by Novoselic and the band's live guitarist Pat Smear for a version of Nirvana's "Marigold", a 1992 Grohl original, which was a B-side on Nirvana's "Heart-Shaped Box". Novoselic also recorded bass and accordion for the song "I Should Have Known", appearing on Foo Fighters' seventh studio album Wasting Light.

On December 5, 2017, Novoselic joined Foo Fighters on stage at Matthew Knight Arena in Eugene, Oregon, to play bass guitar on "Big Me", a song from the Foo Fighters' debut album Foo Fighters. Ten months later, on October 6, 2018, Novoselic joined the band during an encore to play several Nirvana songs, with Grohl on drums, Pat Smear on guitar, and John J. McCauley and Joan Jett filling in as their lead singer.

== Political and social activism ==
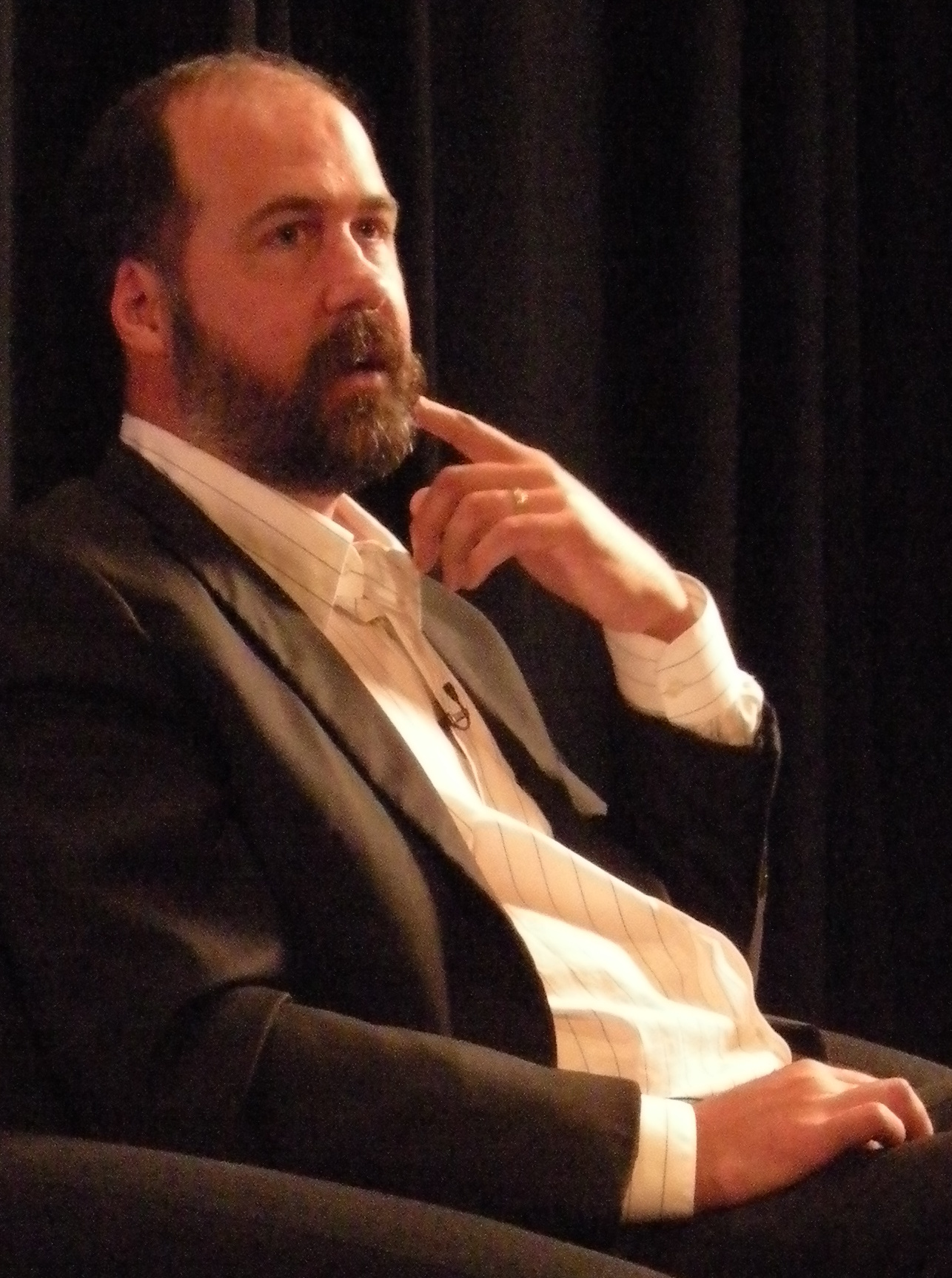
Novoselic in 2008

Novoselic was interested in politics at a young age, including the Northern Ireland conflict between Irish Nationalists and Unionists.

In 1992, the Washington State Legislature attempted to pass a bill called the Erotic Music Law. The law would have allowed courts to declare certain albums "erotic" due to their content and would have made it illegal to sell those albums to anyone under the age of 18. Novoselic and Nirvana actively campaigned against the bill and performed a benefit concert for an organization that opposed it. Novoselic appeared on KOMO-TV's Town Meeting as part of the campaign against this bill.

In 1995, the Erotic Music Law was reintroduced to the Washington State Legislature as the Matters Harmful to Minors bill. Noting that the music industry had serious clout in Seattle given the success of the grunge scene, Novoselic proposed creating a political action committee, which was named JAMPAC (Joint Artists and Musicians Political Action Committee). Over the next several years, JAMPAC fought a number of different issues, including the Teen Dance Ordinance, a 1985 law that strictly limited the ability of minors to attend shows. With JAMPAC, Novoselic began to turn his focus more and more towards politics.

Novoselic has advocated for electoral reform (especially instant-runoff voting and proportional representation). He considered a 2004 run for Lieutenant Governor of Washington as a Democrat, challenging an incumbent of the same party, but ultimately decided against it. He also joined the board of FairVote (then the Center for Voting and Democracy) and was appointed chair in January 2008. In 2020, Novoselic became board chair of Zócalo Public Square.

Novoselic's first book, Of Grunge and Government: Let's Fix This Broken Democracy, was published in October 2004. It covers Novoselic's musical past, including Nirvana's worldwide popularity in the early 1990s.

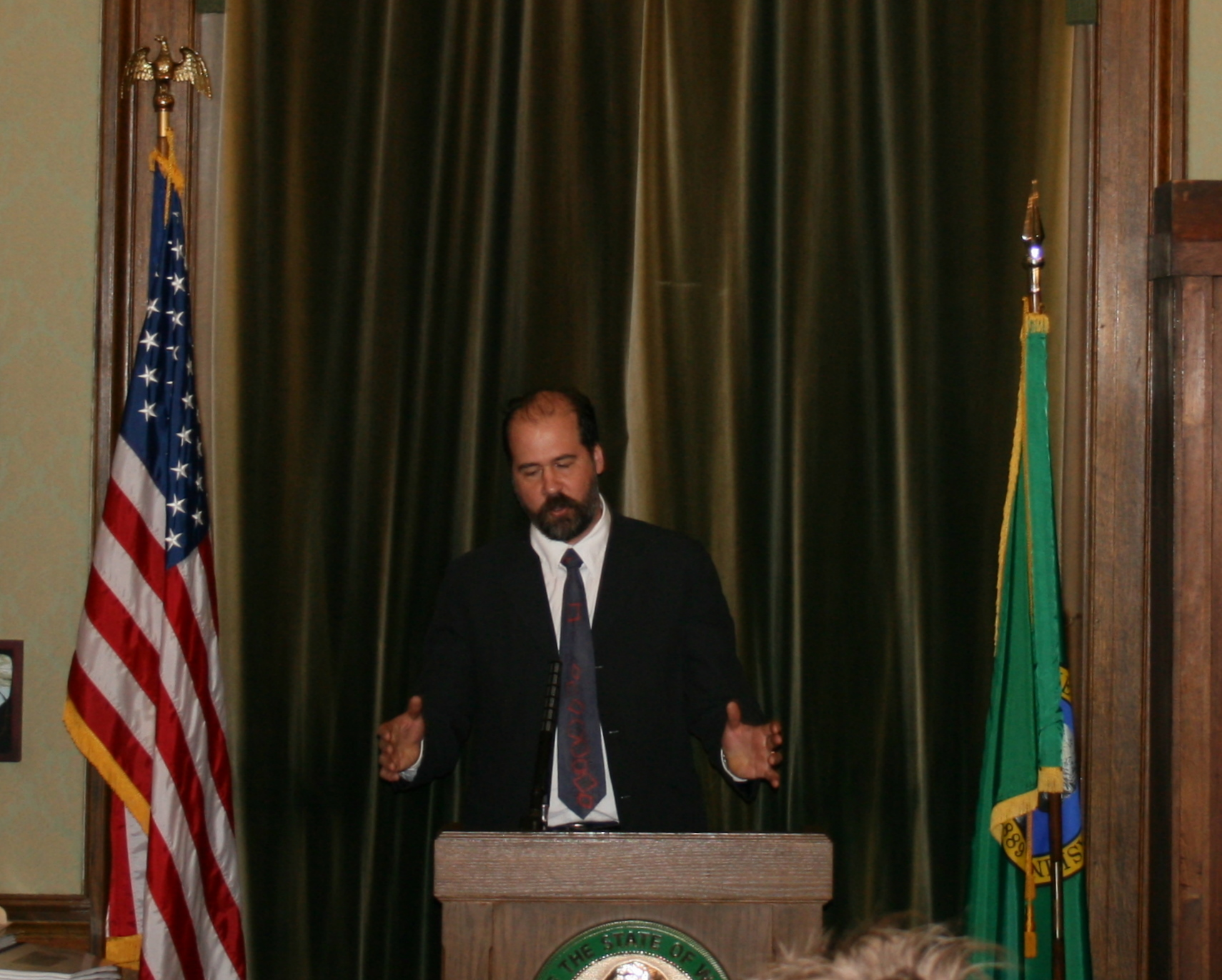
Novoselic giving a speech in 2009

Novoselic supported Democratic Senator Barack Obama in the 2008 Democratic presidential primaries and in the 2008 general election. He later broke with the Democratic Party, stating that "it's a top-down structure" averse to reform from its grassroots.

In 2009, Novoselic ran for county clerk of Wahkiakum County, Washington, but later withdrew his candidacy. He had sought the office as a candidate of the "Grange Party" (a reference to his membership in the National Grange of the Order of Patrons of Husbandry) although no such party exists. His campaign was intended as a protest against Washington State's party system, in which a candidate can claim any party (real or fictional) as their own without consent or support from the party. Novoselic explained his support for fair voting reforms on C-SPAN's Washington Journal in 2012.

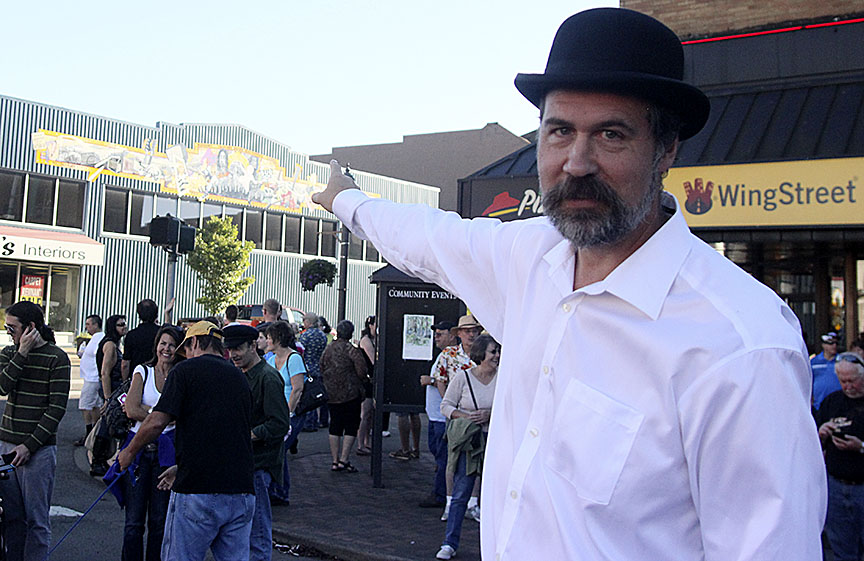
Novoselic points at a mural showcasing Nirvana in downtown Aberdeen in 2014.

In 2014, Novoselic voiced his support for Eddie Vedder‘s statements regarding the Israeli–Palestinian conflict, saying "The people of Palestine and Israel deserve peace and prosperity. ... It is the knuckleheads on both sides that should be criticized and not the singer from a rock band."

In an interview for Reason TV, Novoselic was asked how he described his political views. He responded, "I'm an anarcho-capitalist, socialist, moderate. ... I don't know" and continued to say that while his political views couldn't be easily categorized, he finds fault in the political philosophies of both the left and right-wing. In 2015, he supported Lawrence Lessig's presidential campaign. In 2016, Novoselic supported and campaigned for Libertarian presidential candidate Gary Johnson.

In June 2020, Novoselic made a Facebook post discussing President Donald Trump's speech in response to unrest following the murder of George Floyd. He called Trump "strong and direct" but added that he "should not be sending troops into states". Following criticism, Novoselic made his Facebook page private and deleted his Twitter account. After receiving backlash for the original post, Novoselic clarified: "As an avowed independent, I don't endorse a major party or candidate. And it feels insane to have to say this, but I don't support fascism, and I don't support an authoritarian state. I believe in a civilized society and that we all have to work toward that".

On May 22, 2023, the Forward Party published a tweet welcoming Novoselic onto their board.

In 2024, Novoselic founded the Cascade Party of Washington, a minor political party. To qualify as a political party, he announced a campaign for president in the 2024 United States presidential election, with a goal to gather 1,000 signatures. On August 24, 2024, he gathered the votes needed, and dropped out.

== In other media ==
From November 2007 to September 2010, Novoselic wrote a blog for the Seattle Weekly website.

Novoselic has been the DJ numerous times on KMUN radio.

In 2014, ahead of Nirvana's induction into the Rock and Roll Hall of Fame, Novoselic and Dave Grohl made guest appearances on The Tonight Show Starring Jimmy Fallon.

== Personal life ==
In 1989, Novoselic married Shelli Hyrkas, whom he had dated in high school. They divorced in 1999. In early 2004, he married American artist Darbury Ayn Stenderu. They reside on a farm near Deep River, Washington, where they grow their own food. Novoselic stated, "I live out in the country now, and it's quiet, and it's a place where I can think a lot."

Novoselic is an FAA-licensed pilot, earning a single-engine land rating after passing his flight test in April 2002. He went on to earn a multi-engine pilot certificate in February 2018. He has a strong interest in animals, geology, nature, and other sciences.

In 2016, Novoselic earned a BSc in social sciences from Washington State University.

== Discography ==
=== With Nirvana ===
- Bleach (1989)
- Nevermind (1991)
- In Utero (1993)

=== With Sweet 75 ===
- Sweet 75 (1997)

=== With the No WTO Combo ===
- Live from the Battle in Seattle (2000)

=== With Eyes Adrift ===
- Eyes Adrift (2002)

=== With Flipper ===
- Love (2009)
- Fight (2009)

=== With Filthy Friends ===
- Invitation (2017)

=== With Giants in the Trees ===
- Giants in the Trees (2017)
- Volume 2 (2019)

=== With Butterfly Launches From Spar Pole ===
- Butterfly Launches From Spar Pole (2019)

=== With 3rd Secret ===
- 3rd Secret (2022)
- 2nd 3rd Secret (2023)

=== Collaborations ===
Year	Artist	Release	Additional information
1990	Mark Lanegan	The Winding Sheet	Bass on "Where Did You Sleep Last Night"
1995	Mike Watt	Ball-Hog or Tugboat?	Organ on "Against The 70's"
1995	The Stinky Puffs	A Little Tiny Smelly Bit of...the Stinky Puffs	Bass on "Buddies Aren't Butts" (live), "Menendez' Killed Their Parents" (live), "I'll Love You Anyway" (live), and "I Am Gross/ No You're Not" (live)
1996	Johnny Cash	Twisted Willie	Bass on "Time of the Preacher"
1997	Sky Cries Mary	Moonbathing on Sleeping Leaves	Acoustic Bass on "Gliding"
2002	Aya	Senjou no Hana	Bass on "Prisoner"
2002	Foo Fighters	One by One	Backing vocals on "Walking a Line"
2010	Foo Fighters	Wasting Light	Bass and accordion on "I Should Have Known"
2012	Nirvana with Paul McCartney	Sound City: Real to Reel	Bass on "Cut Me Some Slack"
2014	Kultur Shock	IX	Bass and accordion on "S One Strane Plive"
2015	Peter Buck	Warzone Earth	Bass on "Long Time Dead"
2016	Melvins	Basses Loaded	Bass and accordion on "Maybe I Am Amused"
2017	Filthy Friends	Any Kind Of Crowd (single)	Bass on "Editions of You"
2017	Filthy Friends	Invitation	Bass on "Brother" and "Makers"
2024	Nando Reis	Uma Estrela Misteriosa Revelará o Segredo	Accordion on "Tome o Seu Lugar"

== Notes ==
- Bloch-Garcia, Peter. "Kick Out the Jams". Real Change News. 2000.
