= You Can't Fix This =

Single by Stevie Nicks, Dave Grohl, Taylor Hawkins, Rami Jaffee

from the album Sound City: Real to Reel
- Released: February 15, 2013
- Recorded: November 2011
- Genre: Rock
- Length: 5:56
- Label: Roswell/RCA
- Songwriters: Stevie Nicks, Dave Grohl, Taylor Hawkins
- Producer: Butch Vig

"You Can't Fix This" is a 2013 song by Stevie Nicks, Dave Grohl, Taylor Hawkins, and Rami Jaffee. The song was recorded in Dave Grohl’s Studio 606 and recorded for the soundtrack album Sound City: Real to Reel.

The song peaked on the Belgium charts at number 47.

== Writing and recording ==
The song was written about Nicks' godson Glen B. Parrish, Jr. who overdosed at a party at the age of 18. The song was recorded in Dave Grohl’s Studio 606. The Sound City players played the song several times at festivals and on The Late Show with David Letterman.

== Charts ==
Chart (2013)	Peak position
Belgium (Ultratip Bubbling Under Wallonia)	47
