= 3rd Secret =

American alternative rock supergroup

- Origin: Seattle, Washington
- Genres: Alternative rock, folk rock, grunge
- Years active: 2021–present
- Members: Matt Cameron; Jon "Bubba" Dupree; Jennifer Johnson; Krist Novoselic; Jillian Raye; Kim Thayil
- Website: https://3rdsecret.com

3rd Secret is an American alternative rock supergroup formed in late 2021. It features members of the grunge bands Soundgarden, Nirvana, and Pearl Jam.

The band's lineup includes bass guitarist/accordionist Krist Novoselic of Nirvana, drummer Matt Cameron of Pearl Jam and Soundgarden, guitarists Kim Thayil of Soundgarden and Jon "Bubba" Dupree of Void, and vocalists Jillian Raye and Jennifer Johnson. Novoselic, Johnson, and Raye played together in the band Giants in the Trees; while Cameron and Dupree played together in Hater.

== History ==
On April 11, 2022, the band released their self-titled debut album and lead single "I Choose Me", the first music that longtime bandmates Thayil and Cameron had worked on together since Soundgarden lead singer Chris Cornell died in 2017. The album was engineered by frequent Nirvana and Soundgarden collaborator Jack Endino. The creation of the album had been kept under wraps, and the album was released as a surprise, although prior to its release the band played a show at the Museum of Pop Culture in Seattle, and in February 2022, Novoselic tweeted that he was working on something new.

Regarding the recording process of the album and the amount of songs they decided to record, the band stated on their website, "At one time, there was an idea for three separate albums by individuals to include various contributions from the musicians above. Anything seemed possible and attitudes were positive. In late 2021, feeling like too much time had passed, or just plain impatient, Krist and Jillian proposed 3rd Secret — combining material recorded in Seattle and on the farm. And this is how we got to this record with Jillian and Krist on the cover." On June 22, 2023, the band released their second album, titled The 2nd 3rd Secret.

== Discography ==
=== Albums ===
Title	Album details
3rd Secret	Released: April 11, 2022; Label: Self-release; Formats: Streaming
The 2nd 3rd Secret	Released: June 22, 2023; Label: Self-release; Formats: Streaming
