= JoAnna James =

American singer-songwriter

- Origin: Saint Paul, Minnesota, United States
- Genres: rock, blues, folk-pop, soul,
- Occupation(s): Singer-songwriter, musician
- Instrument(s): Vocals, violin, guitar
- Labels: Eclectone
- Website: Official website

JoAnna James is an American soul, folk and blues musician from Saint Paul, Minnesota, United States. Known for her sultry whispers or gale-force wails, James has been said to be born with "a voice guaranteed to make the hairs on the back of your neck stand up" (Pulse of the Twin Cities).

== Biography ==
James was seven years old when her grandfather purchased her a violin from a nun for $100. She soon taught herself chords on the guitar as well by listening to Patsy Cline, Prince and Nirvana, Jeff Buckley and Bob Dylan. In 2005 and 2006, James played nearly 250 shows, in addition to receiving two consecutive Minnesota Music Awards for "Female Vocalist of the Year." City Pages has heralded her as "goose-bump good." It has been said that her stage presence is both "pure" and "intense."

James has also shared the stage with national and international touring musicians such as Jamie Cullum, Missy Higgins, Jessy Greene, Rami Jaffee (Foo Fighters, The Wallflowers), Ken Stringfellow (of R.E.M., The Posies and Big Star), Joseph Arthur, A Girl Called Eddy, The Honeydogs, Mason Jennings, Steve Poltz, The New Standards, Slim Dunlap (the Replacements), Cloud Cult, Mary Lou Lord, and Dan Wilson among others.

James has been a studio musician on many local releases, as well as Grammy Award winner Dan Wilson's, Free Life (American, 2007).

She currently has two album releases. She released a self-titled CD in the spring of 2004 and her second album, Desire, in the summer of 2005. She travelled to Lexington, Kentucky, and teamed up with record producer, Duane Lundy, to record a new EP that was released in early 2007 on Eclectone Records.

In 2009, James moved to California, leaving a large community of fans in Minnesota.

== Discography ==
- JoAnna James, 2004
- Desire, 2005
- Back of My Mind, 2007, Eclectone Records
- Try, 2011
- Walk With the Night, 2023
