= Parts of Speech (album) =

2013 album by Dessa

Studio album by Dessa
- Released: June 25, 2013
- Studios: The Hideaway; The Birdcage; McNally Smith College of Music; Fleur de Tete
- Genres: Hip-hop; alternative hip-hop
- Length: 44:28
- Label: Doomtree Records
- Producers: Lazerbeak; Paper Tiger

Dessa chronology
Castor, the Twin (2011)	Parts of Speech (2013)	Parts of Speech, Re-Edited (2014)

Professional ratings
Aggregate scores
Source	Rating
Metacritic	78/100
Review scores
Source	Rating
The A.V. Club	B+

Parts of Speech is the third studio album by Dessa, a member of Minneapolis indie hip-hop collective Doomtree. It was released by Doomtree Records on June 25, 2013. An EP of remixes entitled Parts of Speech, Re-Edited was released on June 17, 2014.

== Reception ==
At Metacritic, which assigns a weighted average score out of 100 to reviews from mainstream critics, Parts of Speech received an average score of 78% based on 4 reviews, indicating "generally favorable reviews".

It debuted at number 74 on the Billboard 200 chart, with first-week sales of 5,800 copies in the United States.

== Track listing ==
All tracks are written by Dessa, except "I'm Going Down" by Bruce Springsteen.

No.	Title	Length
1.	"The Man I Knew"	3:34
2.	"Call Off Your Ghost"	3:38
3.	"Warsaw"	3:11
4.	"Skeleton Key"	3:34
5.	"Dear Marie"	3:59
6.	"I'm Going Down"	3:45
7.	"Fighting Fish"	3:02
8.	"The Lamb"	3:43
9.	"Beekeeper"	3:55
10.	"Annabelle"	4:00
11.	"It's Only Me"	3:48
12.	"Sound the Bells"	4:20

== Personnel ==
Credits adapted from liner notes.

- Dessa – vocals, piano, executive production, art direction
- Dustin Kiel – guitar, piano, programming, executive production
- Sean McPherson – acoustic bass, electric bass
- Joey Van Phillips – drums, percussion, vibraphone
- Paper Tiger – production (on 2, 3 and 8)
- Lazerbeak – production (on 4 and 7), executive production
- Rebecca Arons – cello
- Nick Ogawa – cello
- Jessy Greene – violin
- Scott Agster – trombone
- Gabriel Douglas – vocals
- Aby Wolf – vocals
- Benjamin Burwell – vocals
- Mayda – guitar, synthesizer, drum programming
- Emily Dantuma – sampled cello
- Jake Wallenius – sampled drums
- Joe Mabbott – mixing, engineering
- Brady Moen – additional engineering, additional editing
- Bruce Templeton – mastering
- Kai Benson – art direction, design
- Bill Phelps – photography

== Charts ==
Chart	Peak position
US Billboard 200	74
US Independent Albums (Billboard)	19
US Tastemaker Albums (Billboard)	8
