= Volume 2 (Giants in the Trees album) =

Studio album by Giants in the Trees
- Released: March 29, 2019
- Recorded: Wahkiakum County
- Genres: Alternative rock, Psychedelia, Country
- Length: 39:00
- Labels: Giants in the Trees, LLC.
- Producer: Jack Endino

Giants in the Trees chronology
Giants in the Trees (2017)	Volume 2 (2019)

Singles from Volume 2
- 1. "Star Machine" Released: May 20, 2019

Volume 2 is the second and final album by American rock band Giants in the Trees. It contains the single "Star Machine". The album was released on March 29, 2019.

== Track listing ==
No.	Title	Length
1.	"Feel You Now"	5:20
2.	"It Goes"	3:16
3.	"My Name"	4:36
4.	"Star Machine"	4:04
5.	"Weight of the World"	3:27
6.	"Sons and Daughters"	4:40
7.	"Hot Blooded"	3:21
8.	"Bright Side"	3:22
9.	"This Is Love"	3:45
10.	"Nevermore"	3:09
Total length:		39:00

== Reception ==
Kerrang gave the album 4/5, saying it was more cohesive than the first, and would appeal to fans of Sleater-Kinney and Emma Ruth Rundle.
