= A Badly Broken Code =

2010 album by Dessa

Studio album by Dessa
- Released: January 19, 2010
- Genres: Hip-hop; alternative hip-hop
- Length: 47:19
- Label: Doomtree
- Producers: MK Larada; Dessa; Lazerbeak; Cecil Otter; Paper Tiger; Big Jess; Andrew 'Ronin' Lucas

Dessa chronology
False Hopes (2005)	A Badly Broken Code (2010)	Castor, the Twin (2011)

Professional ratings
Review scores
Source	Rating
The A.V. Club	A−
Robert Christgau	A−
HipHopDX	4/5
Tiny Mix Tapes	4/5 stars

A Badly Broken Code is the debut studio album by Dessa, a member of Minneapolis indie hip-hop collective Doomtree. It was released by Doomtree Records in 2010.

The album title comes from a line in the poem "Nostalgia" by American poet Billy Collins.

== Reception ==
Jakob Dorof of Tiny Mix Tapes gave the album 4 stars out of 5, saying, "The result is likely one of the best hip-hop songs you'll hear this year, let alone from the rare type of MC that manages to be white, female, and supremely talented all in one."

The A.V. Club listed it as the 20th best album of 2010. In 2010, City Pages listed it as the "Best Local Album of the Past 12 Months".

The track "The Bullpen" was frequently used as walk out music at rallies by Minnesota Senator Amy Klobuchar during her 2020 Democratic presidential primaries campaign.

== Track listing ==
No.	Title	Producer(s)	Length
1.	"Children's Work"	MK Larada	3:12
2.	"Poor Atlas"	Dessa	1:38
3.	"The Crow"	Lazerbeak	3:38
4.	"Dixon's Girl"	MK Larada	2:43
5.	"Mineshaft II"	Cecil Otter	3:41
6.	"The Chaconne" (featuring Matthew Santos)	Paper Tiger	4:42
7.	"Matches to Paper Dolls"	Big Jess	3:31
8.	"Go Home"	Paper Tiger	3:32
9.	"Seamstress"	MK Larada	3:59
10.	"Dutch"	Lazerbeak	3:20
11.	"The Bullpen"	Paper Tiger	2:36
12.	"Momento Mori"	MK Larada; Dessa	2:18
13.	"Crew"	Paper Tiger	2:56
14.	"Alibi"	Paper Tiger	3:03
15.	"Into the Spin"	Andrew 'Ronin' Lucas; Dessa	2:35

== Charts ==
Chart	Peak position
US Heatseekers Albums (Billboard)	13
US Top R&B/Hip-Hop Albums (Billboard)	48
US Rap Albums (Billboard)	22
