= Sound City: Real to Reel =

Soundtrack album by various artists (Sound City Players)
- Released: March 12, 2013
- Recorded: November 2–3, 2011
- Studio: Studio 606 West (Northridge, Los Angeles, California)
- Genre: Rock
- Length: 55:31
- Label: Roswell/RCA
- Producer: Butch Vig

Dave Grohl chronology
Medium Rare (2011)	Sound City: Real to Reel (2013)	Sonic Highways (2014)

Singles from Sound City: Real to Reel
- 1. "Cut Me Some Slack" Released: December 14, 2012; 2. "From Can to Can't" Released: January 15, 2013; 3. "You Can't Fix This" Released: February 15, 2013; 4. "Mantra" Released: March 12, 2013

Professional ratings
Aggregate scores
Source	Rating
Metacritic	65/100
Review scores
Source	Rating
About.com	4/5 stars
AllMusic	3/5 stars
The Austin Chronicle	3/5 stars
The A.V. Club	C+
Consequence of Sound	2.5/5 stars
Filter	64/100
NME	7/10 stars
Pitchfork	5.3/10
Rolling Stone	3.5/5 stars
Spin	6/10

Sound City: Real to Reel is the soundtrack of the documentary film Sound City and the only studio album by the Dave Grohl-led supergroup Sound City Players. It was officially released on March 12, 2013. Grohl is the only musician to perform on all tracks, with various other musicians performing on each track.

The soundtrack received two Grammy Awards: Best Compilation Soundtrack for Visual Media and Best Rock Song (for "Cut Me Some Slack").

== Track listing ==
Track listing
No.	Title	Performers	Length
1.	"Heaven and All"	Robert Levon Been; Dave Grohl; Peter Hayes	5:27
2.	"Time Slowing Down"	Chris Goss; Tim Commerford; Grohl; Brad Wilk	5:58
3.	"You Can't Fix This"	Stevie Nicks; Grohl; Taylor Hawkins; Rami Jaffee	5:56
4.	"The Man That Never Was"	Rick Springfield; Grohl; Hawkins; Nate Mendel; Pat Smear	3:24
5.	"Your Wife Is Calling"	Lee Ving; Grohl; Hawkins; Alain Johannes; Smear	3:20
6.	"From Can to Can't"	Corey Taylor; Grohl; Rick Nielsen; Scott Reeder	4:50
7.	"Centipede"	Josh Homme; Goss; Grohl; Johannes	5:10
8.	"A Trick With No Sleeve"	Johannes; Grohl; Homme	4:55
9.	"Cut Me Some Slack"	Paul McCartney; Grohl; Krist Novoselic; Smear	4:38
10.	"If I Were Me"	Grohl; Jessy Greene; Jaffee; Jim Keltner	4:10
11.	"Mantra"	Grohl; Homme; Trent Reznor	7:43
Total length:			55:31

== Personnel ==
- Credits for Sound City: Real to Reel adapted from AllMusic, and the Sound City film.

=== Performance ===
as composer and primary artist

- Robert Levon Been
- Tim Commerford
- Chris Goss
- Jessy Greene
- Dave Grohl
- Taylor Hawkins
- Peter Hayes
- Joshua Homme
- Rami Jaffee
- Alain Johannes
- Jim Keltner
- Paul McCartney
- Nate Mendel
- Stevie Nicks
- Rick Nielsen
- Krist Novoselic
- Scott Reeder
- Trent Reznor
- Pat Smear
- Rick Springfield
- Corey Taylor
- Lee Ving
- Brad Wilk

=== Technical ===
- Sami Ansari – photography
- Matt Bissonette – composer
- James Brown – engineer, mixing
- Joe LaPorta – mastering
- Emily Lazar – mastering
- Chris Lord-Alge – mixing
- John Lousteau – engineer
- Jim Scott – engineer
- Derek Silverman – engineering support
- Butch Vig – producer

== Charts ==
=== Weekly charts ===
Weekly chart performance for Sound City: Real to Reel
Chart (2013)	Peak position
Australian Albums (ARIA)	6
Austrian Albums (Ö3 Austria)	12
Belgian Albums (Ultratop Flanders)	17
Belgian Albums (Ultratop Wallonia)	51
Canadian Albums (Billboard)	3
Danish Albums (Hitlisten)	23
Dutch Albums (Album Top 100)	9
Finnish Albums (Suomen virallinen lista)	33
French Albums (SNEP)	76
German Albums (Offizielle Top 100)	32
New Zealand Albums (RMNZ)	5
Norwegian Albums (VG-lista)	18
Swiss Albums (Schweizer Hitparade)	14
UK Albums (OCC)	19
US Billboard 200	8
US Top Hard Rock Albums (Billboard)	1
US Top Rock Albums (Billboard)	4
US Top Alternative Albums (Billboard)	2
US Soundtrack Albums (Billboard)	1

=== Year-end charts ===
Year-end chart performance for Sound City: Real to Reel
Chart (2013)	Position
Belgian Albums (Ultratop Flanders)	191
US Soundtrack Albums (Billboard)	17

== Certifications ==
Certifications for Sound City: Real to Reel
Region	Certification	Certified units/sales
Australia (ARIA)	Platinum	15,000^{^}
^{^} Shipments figures based on certification alone.
