= Void (band) =

American hardcore punk band

- Lead vocalist John Weiffenbach in 1981

Background information
- Origin: Columbia, Maryland
- Genres: Hardcore punk; thrashcore
- Years active: 1979–1984
- Label: Dischord
- Past members: John Weiffenbach; Jon "Bubba" Dupree; Chris Stover; Sean Finnegan

Void was an American hardcore punk band formed in Columbia, Maryland, in 1980. The group was a pioneering force in the thriving Washington, D.C., hardcore scene during the early 1980s, successfully combining elements of punk with heavy metal in a style that was accepted by the scene's otherwise exclusive community. Void's punk metal fusion sound was marked by guitarist Bubba Dupree's innovative guitar work and the "unhinged" vocals of John Weiffenbach, which resonated in the band's chaotic but popular live performances. Like many of their contemporaries, Void had a short-lived recording career, limited to the split album Faith/Void Split with the Faith, and three tracks on the Flex Your Head compilation LP, both released by Dischord Records. However, they have enjoyed an enduring cult following among hardcore aficionados.

== History ==
Inspired by punk rock bands the Teen Idles and Minor Threat, Void—a name which referred to Black Sabbath's song "Into the Void"—was formed in 1979, and consisted of an interracial lineup unique to the era, featuring high school students Jon "Bubba" Dupree (lead guitar), John Weiffenbach (vocals), Chris Stover (bass), and Sean Finnegan (drums). The group soon began associating with scenesters Ian MacKaye, Henry Rollins, and Bert Queiroz, who introduced Void to artists of the flourishing underground music scene in Washington, D.C. By late 1980, Void was embraced by the generally exclusive D.C. punk community, even though the band was not native to the city, being in closer proximity to Baltimore's scene. Dupree, while reflecting on the band's acceptance, considered Void "the outcast rednecks" who did not initially reflect upon the hardcore style associated with contemporary groups.

Void first performed in D.C. at a Wilson Center hardcore festival organized by Bad Brains, where the group was one of 15 bands present. The band was notorious for its live act, which thrived off Weiffenbach's chaotic stage persona and his manic vocals. Additionally, Void's sound was marked by alternating blasts of power chords and shrieking feedback within brief but upbeat songs, creating a higher degree of intensity than most of their contemporaries. In 1981, Void entered the studio for the first time following an unsuccessful recording session at Hit and Run Recording, and cut demos titled "Condensed Flesh" at record producer Don Zientara's Inner Ear Studios. Songs from the session and additional studio time later in the year later surfaced on the Condensed Flesh EP in 1992. Shortly thereafter, Ian MacKaye signed Void to his co-owned label Dischord Records, and the group made their debut in January 1982 on the compilation album Flex Your Head, which featured the three songs "Dehumanized", "Authority", and "My Rules".

In mid-1982, Void began touring across the Northeast, most notably at the CBGB music club, and introduced characteristics of heavy metal into their music, which became influential in originating punk metal fusion. Initially, this blend arose organically, and was further explored on the split album Faith/Void Split with fellow D.C. band the Faith in September 1982. The split album is hailed as one of the earliest examples of hardcore-metal crossover, and Void's frantic musical approach is often considered particularly influential. Music critic Doug Mosurock described Void's side of the album as "quintessential American hardcore", also noting that "Very few bands could match the aggression, intensity, and amateur/weirdo vibes on display within Void's dozen tracks from the split". Dischord Records first reissued Faith/Void Split in 1985 and digitally remastered it in 2008.

With Finnegan insisting the band needed multi-track recording facilities, Void chose not to continue releasing material through Dischord, and instead made a deal with Touch and Go Records in mid-1983. The group recorded an album's worth of material; however, the band members were drifting in different musical directions including glam rock, hip hop, and hard rock. Void strayed further apart because of their gigs becoming increasingly manic, and by late 1983 the group disbanded after the members graduated from high school. Corey Rusk, the owner of Touch and Go, was uninterested in releasing the album of a dissolved band while in the midst of securing a big deal with the Butthole Surfers. Although members of Void were adamant about leaving the botched album unreleased, hardcore aficionados heavily bootlegged it onto cassette tapes titled Potions for Bad Dreams. Bands such as White Zombie and the Melvins have claimed Potions for Bad Dreams shaped their own musical styles.

Dupree was the only member of Void to continue his music career after the band, guesting with Soundgarden, Moby, and Dave Grohl in the 1990s and 2000s, and performing as a member of the bands Earth Eighteen, Hater, 3rd Secret and Sleep. In 2011, Dischord Records released the compilation album Sessions 1981-83, which featured studio outtakes, previously unreleased tracks, and live recordings between 1981 and 1983. Finnegan died of a heart attack in 2008.

== Discography ==
=== Studio albums ===
- Faith/Void Split (Dischord, 1982)
- Potion for Bad Dreams (recorded 1983; unreleased, subsequently bootlegged)

=== Demos ===
- Condensed Flesh 7-inch EP (Eye 95, 1992)

=== Compilation albums ===
- "Dehumanized", "Authority" and "My Rules" on Flex Your Head LP/CD (Dischord, 1982)
- "Get Out of My Way" on Bouncing Babies LP (Fountain of Youth, 1984)
- "Get Out of My Way" on Lost & Found 7-inch (Lost & Found, 1990)
- "Who Are You" on Punk Anderson's Favourites bootleg 2×CD (Starving Missile, 1994)
- "Dehumanized", "Black, Jewish and Poor" and "Authority" (take 1 and 2)" on 20 Years of Dischord 3×CD (Dischord, 2002)
- "Who Are You/Time to Die" on the American Hardcore Soundtrack (Rhino Entertainment, 2006)
- "Sessions 1981-83" (Dischord, 2011)
