= Sound City (film) =

- Theatrical release poster
- Directed by: Dave Grohl
- Written by: Mark Monroe
- Produced by: Dave Grohl; James A. Rota; John Ramsay
- Cinematography: Kenny Stoff
- Edited by: Paul Crowder
- Production companies: Therapy Content; Diamond Docs
- Distributed by: Variance Films; Roswell Films; Gravitas Ventures
- Release dates: January 18, 2013 (Sundance Festival); February 1, 2013 (Cinemas and video on demand)
- Running time: 107 minutes
- Country: United States
- Language: English
- Box office: $521,181

Sound City is a 2013 American documentary film produced and directed by Dave Grohl, in his directorial debut, about the history of recording studio Sound City Studios in Van Nuys, Los Angeles. Grohl was inspired to create the documentary after he purchased several items from the studio, including the Neve 8028 analog mixing console, when it stopped operating as a commercial studio in 2011. The film discusses the historic importance of Sound City Studios and its Neve 8028 console to the world of rock music, along with other recording genres. Sound City debuted on January 18, 2013, to positive reviews, with a 100% Rotten Tomatoes score. The film engendered a record, Sound City: Real to Reel, which received two Grammy Awards.

== Background ==
=== Historical importance ===
The 106-minute documentary film covers a variety of important and record-breaking albums that all came out of Sound City Studios. Sound City Studios is located in the San Fernando Valley, amidst rows of industrial warehouses. The little-known recording studio housed a rare analog Neve recording console and had a reputation for recording drums. Artists such as Nirvana, Kyuss, Red Hot Chili Peppers, Fleetwood Mac, Neil Young, Rick Springfield, Tom Petty, Rage Against the Machine, and Slipknot recorded groundbreaking music at the studio. In 1991 Nirvana recorded the album Nevermind at Sound City Studios. This was one of many platinum albums that came out of the studio, placing Sound City among the most well-known names and record labels in the music industry. Sound City played an important role in the history of Fleetwood Mac. After hearing a recording of Stevie Nicks and Lindsey Buckingham made at Sound City, Mick Fleetwood asked Buckingham if he would join, to which he agreed so long as Nicks was invited in as well. This version of the group later earned three Grammy awards.

=== Neve 8028 Console ===
The documentary credits much of the studio's success to its Neve 8028 mixing console and the strong and grungy drum sound that the studio produced. The sound that came out of the studio is often credited to the shape of the studio and the way that sound waves acted within the room. Even though much of the studio's success was credited to the shape of its rooms, another large factor was credited to its mixing console. Sound Studios' custom Neve 8028 produced a strong and punchy sound that defined '70s rock music. Sound City has produced gold & platinum albums for over five decades.

== Synopsis ==
The film tells the story of the studio from its early days in 1969 until it stopped operating as a commercial studio in 2011. The film covers the reasons for the studio's success along with the reasons for the distinct sound that came from the studio. The film covers stories from recording in the studio, the eventual deterioration of the studio, and even the non-musical production of albums in the studio. Sound City even produced albums by people like Bill Cosby. It then follows Dave Grohl's purchase of the studio's Neve 80 Series custom analog console, which he moved to his personal studio, Studio 606. The Neve 8028, "one of four in the world", was designed by Rupert Neve, an English electronics engineer who founded Neve Electronics in 1961. Neve is interviewed by Grohl in the film. In the film, famous musicians who recorded at Sound City, plus Paul McCartney on bass, reunite at Studio 606 for a jam session and to make an album of "all-new all-original songs, each one composed and recorded exclusively for the film within its own 24-hour session on that console."

== Release ==
The film was first exhibited in the 2013 Sundance Film Festival on January 18, 2013, and released on video-on-demand and in theaters on February 1, 2013. It was screened on January 31 in five Australian cities (Melbourne, Sydney, Brisbane, Adelaide and Perth). The documentary was also screened in three cities in Canada (Toronto, Vancouver and Montreal) and 51 cities in the United States. The film was screened for a one-off showing on February 18, 2013, in 23 theaters across the UK.

After the closing credits there is a short, silent segment of a home movie showing a band getting set up. The picture freezes on one person and the following text appears: "In memory of Brian Hauge (1970 – 2012)." He was the key grip of the film.

== Appearances ==
The documentary features interviews conducted by Grohl of artists associated with the studio:

- Vinny Appice
- Frank Black
- Lindsey Buckingham
- Johnny Cash (archival)
- Kurt Cobain (archival)
- Kevin Cronin
- Rivers Cuomo
- Warren DeMartini
- Mick Fleetwood
- John Fogerty
- Neil Giraldo
- Chris Goss
- Josh Homme
- Alain Johannes
- Jim Keltner
- Barry Manilow
- Paul McCartney
- Rupert Neve
- Stevie Nicks
- Rick Nielsen
- Krist Novoselic
- Stephen Pearcy
- Tom Petty
- Nick Raskulinecz
- Trent Reznor
- Ross Robinson
- Rick Rubin
- Jim Scott
- Pat Smear
- Rick Springfield
- Corey Taylor
- Benmont Tench
- Lars Ulrich
- Butch Vig
- Lee Ving
- Brad Wilk
- Neil Young
- Robert Levon Been
- Jessy Greene

Current or former members of the bands Dio, Black Sabbath, Heaven & Hell, Pixies, Fleetwood Mac, Nirvana, REO Speedwagon, Weezer, Ratt, Creedence Clearwater Revival, Queens of the Stone Age, Them Crooked Vultures, The Beatles, Cheap Trick, Tom Petty & The Heartbreakers, Nine Inch Nails, Slipknot, Stone Sour, Metallica, Black Rebel Motorcycle Club, Fear, Foo Fighters and Rage Against the Machine appear in the film. The drummer of Foo Fighters, the late Taylor Hawkins, also appears in the film.

== Reception ==
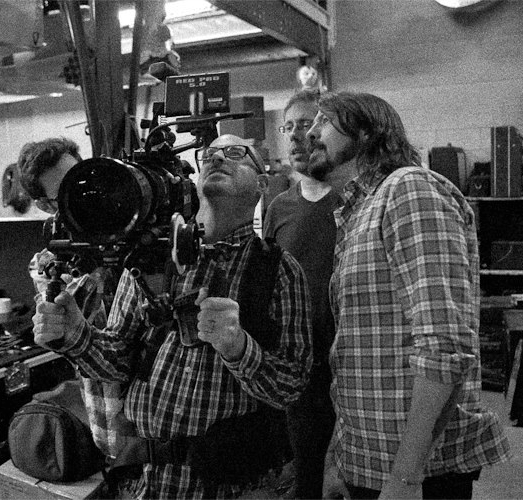
Dave Grohl while directing the movie.

Sound City received overwhelmingly positive reviews. Film review aggregator Rotten Tomatoes reports that 100% of critics gave the film a positive review, with an average rating of 7.7/10 based on 43 reviews. The site's consensus states: "Smart, affectionate, and unabashedly sincere, Sound City pairs a great soundtrack with a well-argued ode to one of rock 'n' roll's most fondly remembered bygone eras." It was one of the highest rated limited release and documentary movies of the year on the website. On Metacritic the film has a score of 76 based on reviews from 15 critics, indicating "generally favorable reviews".

Kenneth Turan from Los Angeles Times gave the film a positive review, saying "High-spirited, emotional and funny, Sound City is, of all things, a mash note to a machine. Not just any machine, however, but one that helped change the face of rock 'n' roll." In a review for The Daily Telegraph, Sebastian Doggart awarded the documentary five out of five stars and proclaimed it as "an exhilarating exploration of the creative process." Peter Travers of Rolling Stone admits "In his directing debut, Dave Grohl shows the instincts of a real filmmaker. Sound City hits you like a shot in the heart." Bill Goodykoontz of The Arizona Republic remarks "Sound City is a music geek's dream, a rollicking look at a dumpy California studio where a lot of musicians found magic. It's also a bit of a mess, like all good rock and roll ought to be", while Elizabeth Weitzman of New York Daily News praised that "Grohl's aim is to explore the aura of a place, but what he winds up proving is that people make the magic."

In a mixed review, Gillian G. Gaar writes, "The film's final third drags a bit because there's too much of the recording sessions Grohl set up using that famous Neve board, most notably featuring Paul McCartney and Grohl's Nirvana bandmate Krist Novoselic (on the raucous "Cut Me Some Slack"), as well as Stevie Nicks, Trent Reznor and Joshua Homme, among others". Phil Gallo from Billboard stated "Grohl's inexperience as a filmmaker only shows when the film makes a sharp turn out of history and into the more recent past: There's a sense that instead of celebrating great rock 'n' roll moments, a product is about to be pitched at the viewer."

The documentary won the Grammy for Best Compilation Soundtrack for Digital Media in 2014. The documentary was also won the Cinema Eye Audience Choice Prize at the Cinema Eye Honors Awards in 2014. The film received a Satellite Award for Best Documentary Film nomination in the 18th edition.

== Certifications ==
| Region | Certification | Certified units/sales |
|---|---|---|
| Australia (ARIA) | Platinum | 15,000^{^} |
| United States (RIAA) | Gold | 50,000^{^} |
^{^} Shipments figures based on certification alone.

== Soundtrack ==
Sound City: Real to Reel is the official soundtrack of the documentary and can be seen in production during the latter part of the film. The album was recorded within Grohl's Studio 606 after his purchase of the Neve console from Sound City Studios. In partnership with a variety of famous recording musicians, the album was released on March 12, 2013. The album would go on to win the Grammy Award for Best Compilation Soundtrack for Visual Media, along with a win for Best Rock Song for "Cut Me Some Slack".

== See also ==
- Foo Fighters: Sonic Highways, television series by Grohl inspired by his documentary Sound City
- Sound City Players
