= Cut Me Some Slack =

Song by Paul McCartney, Dave Grohl, Krist Novoselic, and Pat Smear

from the album Sound City: Real to Reel
- Released: December 14, 2012
- Recorded: April 2012
- Studio: Studio 606 West, Northridge, Los Angeles
- Genre: Rock
- Length: 4:35
- Label: RCA Records
- Songwriters: Paul McCartney; Dave Grohl; Krist Novoselic; Pat Smear
- Producer: Butch Vig

"Cut Me Some Slack" is a rock song by Paul McCartney and former Nirvana members Dave Grohl, Krist Novoselic, and Pat Smear. Released in 2012 on YouTube and the following year on the soundtrack to Dave Grohl's documentary film Sound City, the song won the Grammy Award for Best Rock Song in 2014.

Grohl, who was making a documentary about the history of recording studio Sound City Studios in Van Nuys, Los Angeles, assembled musicians to write and record songs for the film. Among them were McCartney, the former Beatle; plus two musicians who had played with Grohl in Nirvana: Krist Novoselic and Pat Smear. "Cut Me Some Slack" began as a jam between these four; McCartney later described it as a "Nirvana reunion". In addition, Krist Novoselic referred to the partnership as "Sirvana", a portmanteau word of Sir Paul McCartney and Nirvana.

The song was first performed at the 12-12-12 benefit concert by the four, and was released on December 14, 2012, through YouTube. The four performed the song on Saturday Night Live in 2012, and again on June 19, 2013, along with a number of Beatles songs at a McCartney concert in Nirvana's home town of Seattle.

The song was received well by critics. Allmusic called it a "tune with an immediate hook [and] melody".

== Personnel ==
- Paul McCartney – lead vocals, cigar box guitar
- Pat Smear – electric guitar
- Krist Novoselic – bass guitar
- Dave Grohl – drums, backing vocals

== Charts ==
Chart (2012)	Peak position
Canada Rock (Billboard)	27
Poland (LP3)	28
