= List of 1970s albums considered the best =

This is a list of 1970s music albums that multiple music journalists, music magazine, and professional music review websites have considered to be among the best of the 1970s and of all time, separated into the years of each album's release. The albums listed here are included on at least four separate "best/greatest of the 1970s/all time" lists from different professional publications (inclusive of all genres and nationalities) as chosen by their editorial staffs or by a sample size of an entire publication's audience, or hall of fame awards and historical preservation measures.

== List ==
=== 1970 ===
| Release Date | Album | Artist | Genre(s) | Label | Notes | Accolades |
|---|---|---|---|---|---|---|
| January 2, 1970 | The Madcap Laughs | Syd Barrett | Psychedelic folk; folk rock; experimental rock; psychedelic rock; avant-pop | Harvest | | Accolades |
| January 26, 1970 | Bridge over Troubled Water | Simon & Garfunkel | Christian pop; pop rock; folk rock | Columbia | | Reception and legacy |
| January 27, 1970 | Moondance | Van Morrison | Rhythm and blues; soul; rock; jazz; pop; Irish folk | Warner Bros. | Regarded as a precursor to the 1970s adult-oriented rock and soft rock radio formats. | Legacy and reappraisal |
| February 1, 1970 | Sweet Baby James | James Taylor | Folk rock | Warner Bros. | | Reception |
| February 13, 1970 | Black Sabbath | Black Sabbath | Heavy metal | Vertigo | Widely regarded as the first true heavy metal album, with the opening title track, "Black Sabbath" being referred to as the first doom metal song. It is considered one of the darkest albums. | Retrospective reviews and legacy |
| March 11, 1970 | Déjà Vu | Crosby, Stills, Nash & Young | Folk rock | Atlantic | | Legacy |
| March 25, 1970 | Band of Gypsys | Jimi Hendrix | Rock; psychedelic funk; funk rock; funk | Polydor/Track (UK) Capitol (US) Barclay (France) | | Influence and legacy |
| March 30, 1970 | Bitches Brew | Miles Davis | Jazz fusion; avant-garde jazz; jazz-rock; avant-funk; psychedelia | Columbia | Considered a progenitor of the jazz rock genre, as well as a major influence on rock and '70s crossover musicians. | Reception and legacy |
| March 1970 | Cold Fact | Rodriguez | Folk rock; psychedelic folk | Sussex | | Rolling Stone Germany's Top 500 Albums of All Time (2023): #185; 1000 Dischi Fondamentali; FIP's "The 250 essential albums"; Alain Gardinier's "More Than 100 Albums That Have Forged the History of Music in the United States" |
| April 1970 | Yeti | Amon Düül II | Krautrock; progressive rock; psychedelic rock; avant-garde; raga rock | Liberty/Repertoire | | Hartbeat!'s Greatest Albums Of All Time: #29; Uncut's "The 500 Greatest Albums Of The 1970s": #244; 1000 Dischi Fondamentali: "300 Imperdibilii"; Rolling Stone's 50 Greatest Prog Rock Albums of All Time: #41 |
| May 8, 1970 | Let It Be | The Beatles | Rock; blues | Apple | | Legacy |
| May 11, 1970 | Live at Leeds | The Who | Hard rock | Track (UK); Decca (US) | Commonly ranked by music critics as one of the greatest live albums and rock recordings of all time. | Accolades |
| June 5, 1970 | Deep Purple in Rock | Deep Purple | Hard rock; heavy metal | Harvest | | Accolades |
| June 14, 1970 | Workingman's Dead | Grateful Dead | Roots rock; folk rock; country rock; blues rock | Warner Bros. | | Rolling Stone's "500 Greatest Albums of All Time": No. 409; Colin Larkin's All Time Top 1000 Albums: No. 371; Grammy Hall of Fame Induction; Tom Moon's 1,000 Recordings to Hear Before You Die |
| June 1970 | Third | Soft Machine | Jazz rock; progressive rock; electronic | CBS (UK), Columbia (USA) | Consists of four long-form suites that each take up one side of the double album. | The Wire (UK)'s The 100 Most Important Records Ever Made; FNAC's The 1000 Best Albums of All Time: #485; Robert Dimery's 1001 Albums You Must Hear Before You Die; Tom Moon's 1,000 Recordings to Hear Before You Die |
| July 7, 1970 | Fun House | The Stooges | Proto-punk; hard rock; experimental rock; avant-punk; punk jazz; garage rock | Elektra | Regarded as significant in the development of punk rock. It is considered one of the heaviest albums. | Legacy and influence |
| July 8, 1970 | Cosmo's Factory | Creedence Clearwater Revival | Rock | Fantasy | All six of the album's singles charted in the top 5 of the Billboard Hot 100. | Grammy Hall of Fame Induction; Rolling Stone's "500 Greatest Albums of All Time": No. 413; Pitchfork's "The 100 Best Albums of the 1970s": No. 54; Robert Dimery's 1001 Albums You Must Hear Before You Die |
| September 18, 1970 | Paranoid | Black Sabbath | Heavy metal | Vertigo | Widely regarded as one of the greatest and most influential heavy metal albums of all time, often cited as a key influence for the development of the genre and one of its earliest albums. | Accolades |
| September 19, 1970 | After the Gold Rush | Neil Young | Folk rock; country folk; country rock | Reprise | | Accolades |
| September 23, 1970 | Abraxas | Santana | Latin rock; Chicano rock; jazz fusion; psychedelic rock; blues rock | Columbia | | Critical reception Legacy |
| October 5, 1970 | Led Zeppelin III | Led Zeppelin | Folk rock | Atlantic | | Release and reception |
| November 9, 1970 | Layla and Other Assorted Love Songs | Derek and The Dominos | Blues rock | Polydor, Atco | Double album. | Layla and Other Assorted Love Songs |
| November 23, 1970 | Tea for the Tillerman | Cat Stevens | Folk rock | Island (UK/Europe) A&M (US/Canada) | | Critical reception |
| November 27, 1970 | All Things Must Pass | George Harrison | Rock; folk rock | Apple | Triple album. | Legacy |
| November 1970 | Loaded | The Velvet Underground | Rock; pop; proto-punk | Cotillion | | Rolling Stone's "500 Greatest Albums of All Time": No. 242; Colin Larkin's All Time Top 1000 Albums: No. 295; Pitchfork's "The 100 Best Albums of the 1970s": No. 14; The Guardian's "The 100 Best Albums Ever": No. 91 |
| November 1970 | American Beauty | Grateful Dead | Folk rock; country rock; psychedelic rock | Warner Bros. | | Reception |
| November 1970 | Starsailor | Tim Buckley | Avant-rock; psychedelia; jazz fusion | Straight | | Reception and legacy Sunday Herald's: "The 103 Best Albums Ever, Honest" |
| December 11, 1970 | John Lennon/Plastic Ono Band | John Lennon | Rock; avant-pop | Apple | | Retrospective assessments and legacy |
| January 1970 | Liberation Music Orchestra | Charlie Haden | Avant-garde jazz | Impulse! | | Uncut's "The 500 Greatest Albums Of The 1970s": No. 163; Jazzwise's "100 Jazz Albums That Shook the World"; Blow Up's "The 600 Essential Albums"; Rolling Stone Germany's 100 Best Jazz Albums: #26 |

=== 1971 ===
| Release Date | Album | Artist | Genre(s) | Label | Notes | Accolades |
|---|---|---|---|---|---|---|
| January 11, 1971 | Pearl | Janis Joplin | Blues rock; soul blues | Columbia | | Rolling Stone's "500 Greatest Albums of All Time": No. 259; FNAC's The 1000 Best Albums of All Time: #44; NME's "The 500 Greatest Albums of All Time": #207; Grammy Hall of Fame Inductee |
| February 10, 1971 | Tapestry | Carole King | Soft rock; pop | Ode; A&M | | Commercial performance Cultural impact |
| February 19, 1971 | The Yes Album | Yes | Progressive rock | Atlantic | | Uncut's "The 500 Greatest Albums Of The 1970s": No. 258; Robert Dimery's 1001 Albums You Must Hear Before You Die; Colin Larkin's All Time Top 1000 Albums: No. 317; Classic Rock & Metal Hammer's The 200 Greatest Albums of the 70's |
| February 22, 1971 | If I Could Only Remember My Name | David Crosby | Psychedelic folk; freak folk; folk rock | Atlantic | Acclaimed for its uniquely austere mood, eclectic improvisation, and otherworldly harmony singing. Considered to be a progenitor of the freak folk genre. | Modern reception Uncut's "The 500 Greatest Albums Of The 1970s": No. 95 |
| February 1971 | Journey in Satchidananda | Alice Coltrane | Spiritual jazz; modal jazz; avant-garde jazz | Impulse! | | Paste's "The 300 Greatest Albums of All Time": No. 80; Rolling Stone's "500 Greatest Albums of All Time": No. 446; Treble's "The Top 150 Albums of the ’70s": No. 30; Uncut's "The 500 Greatest Albums Of The 1970s": No. 45 |
| March 5, 1971 | Bryter Layter | Nick Drake | Folk; folk-pop; chamber folk; folk rock | Island | | Legacy Uncut's "The 500 Greatest Albums Of The 1970s": No. 25 |
| March 19, 1971 | Songs of Love and Hate | Leonard Cohen | Contemporary folk | Columbia | It is considered one of the darkest albums. | Reception |
| March 19, 1971 | Aqualung | Jethro Tull | Hard rock; folk rock; progressive rock | Chrysalis/Island (Europe) Reprise (America, Japan and Oceania) | | Accolades |
| March 24, 1971 | Histoire de Melody Nelson | Serge Gainsbourg | French pop; avant-funk | Philips | Widely considered by music critics to be one of the greatest French-language albums in popular music history. | FNAC's The 1000 Best Albums of All Time: #2; NME's "The 500 Greatest Albums of All Time": #142; Pitchfork's "The 100 Best Albums of the 1970s": No. 21; Uncut's "The 500 Greatest Albums Of The 1970s": No. 42 |
| April 8, 1971 | In the Land of Grey and Pink | Caravan | Progressive rock; psychedelic rock; Canterbury scene | Deram | | Uncut's "The 500 Greatest Albums Of The 1970s": No. 255; Rolling Stone's 50 Greatest Prog Rock Albums of All Time: #34; Classic Rock & Metal Hammer's The 200 Greatest Albums of the 70's; Ondarock's Rock Milestones List |
| April 19, 1971 | L.A. Woman | The Doors | Blues rock; psychedelic rock | Elektra | | Rolling Stone Germany's Top 100 Albums of All Time (2012): No. 56; Hartbeat!'s Greatest Albums Of All Time; Uncut's "The 500 Greatest Albums Of The 1970s": No. 87; Robert Dimery's 1001 Albums You Must Hear Before You Die |
| April 23, 1971 | Sticky Fingers | The Rolling Stones | Hard rock; roots rock; rock and roll; country rock | Rolling Stones | | Legacy |
| May 21, 1971 | What's Going On | Marvin Gaye | Soul | Tamla | Regarded by music historians as a classic of 1970s soul, and significant to the development of progressive soul. | Accolades |
| May 28, 1971 | Every Picture Tells a Story | Rod Stewart | Folk rock; roots rock | Mercury | | Legacy Uncut's "The 500 Greatest Albums Of The 1970s": No. 110 |
| May 1971 | Stormcock | Roy Harper | Progressive folk, folk baroque | Harvest | Consists of lengthy songs with dense orchestral arrangements, inspiring several progressive folk and alternative rock acts. | NME's "The 500 Greatest Albums of All Time": No. 377; Uncut's "The 500 Greatest Albums Of The 1970s": No. 129; Blow Up's "The 600 Essential Albums"; The Guardian's "1000 Albums to Hear Before You Die" |
| June 22, 1971 | Blue | Joni Mitchell | Folk; folk rock | Reprise | Regarded as a landmark of songwriting and composition. It is considered one of the darkest albums. | Accolades |
| July 6, 1971 | At Fillmore East | The Allman Brothers Band | Blues rock; Southern rock | Capricorn | Double live album, widely regarded as one of the greatest live albums of all time. | Release and critical reception |
| July 12, 1971 | Maggot Brain | Funkadelic | Psychedelic funk; funk rock; R&B; acid rock; psychedelic soul | Westbound | Regarded as among the most intense and best guitar records ever made, as a representation of the tumultuousness and decay of the 1970s. | Rolling Stone's "500 Greatest Albums of All Time": No. 136; Pitchfork's "The 100 Best Albums of the 1970s": No. 17; Robert Dimery's 1001 Albums You Must Hear Before You Die; Sunday Herald's: "The 103 Best Albums Ever, Honest" |
| August 2, 1971 | Who's Next | The Who | Hard rock; arena rock | Track (UK); Decca (US) | | Critical reception and legacy |
| August 6, 1971 | Master of Reality | Black Sabbath | Heavy metal | Vertigo | Regarded by several music critics as the foundation of doom metal, stoner rock, and sludge metal. It is considered one of the heaviest albums. | Reception and legacy |
| August 30, 1971 | Surf's Up | The Beach Boys | Progressive pop; psychedelic pop | Brother/Reprise | | Retrospective assessments |
| August 1971 | Tago Mago | Can | Krautrock; psychedelic rock; experimental rock; avant-funk | United Artists | Consists of long-form experimental tracks blending rock and jazz improvisation, funk rhythms, and musique concrète tape editing techniques. Cited as an influence by many alternative bands. | Accolades |
| September 24, 1971 | Electric Warrior | T. Rex | Glam rock; hard rock | Fly (UK); Reprise (US) | Widely considered to be the first glam rock album, and an influence to hard rock, punk, and new wave." | Accolades |
| October 1971 | John Prine | John Prine | Folk; country | Atlantic | | Rolling Stone's "500 Greatest Albums of All Time": No. 149; Paste's "The 300 Greatest Albums of All Time": No. 181; Uncut's "The 500 Greatest Albums Of The 1970s": No. 162; 33⅓ Installment |
| November 1, 1971 | There's a Riot Goin' On | Sly and the Family Stone | Psychedelic funk; avant-soul; avant-pop; deep funk | Epic | Considered one of the most influential albums of all time, especially to funk, jazz-funk, and hip hop. Oriented around ongoing drug use and disillusionment with "the death of the Sixties". | Reception and legacy |
| November 3, 1971 | The Inner Mounting Flame | The Mahavishnu Orchestra | Jazz fusion; progressive rock | Columbia | | The New York Times' "The 100 Most Important Jazz Recordings"; Classic Rock's 100 Greatest Albums of the 70s: #62; Tom Moon's 1,000 Recordings to Hear Before You Die; The Guardian's "1000 Albums to Hear Before You Die" |
| November 5, 1971 | Meddle | Pink Floyd | Progressive rock; psychedelia | Harvest | | Colin Larkin's All Time Top 1000 Albums: No. 255; Pitchfork's "The 100 Best Albums of the 1970s": No. 67; Tom Moon's 1,000 Recordings to Hear Before You Die; Classic Rock's 100 Greatest Albums of the 70s: #6 |
| November 8, 1971 | Led Zeppelin IV | Led Zeppelin | Hard rock; heavy metal | Atlantic | | Accolades |
| November 11, 1971 | Nilsson Schmilsson | Harry Nilsson | Rock; pop | RCA Victor | | Rolling Stone's "500 Greatest Albums of All Time": No. 281; Treble's "The Top 150 Albums of the ’70s": No. 134; Pitchfork's "The 100 Best Albums of the 1970s": No. 84; Tom Moon's 1,000 Recordings to Hear Before You Die |
| November 12, 1971 | Fragile | Yes | Progressive rock | Atlantic | | Classic Rock's 100 Greatest Rock Albums of All Time: #31; Robert Dimery's 1001 Albums You Must Hear Before You Die; Tom Moon's 1,000 Recordings to Hear Before You Die; Ondarock's Rock Milestones List |
| November 12, 1971 | Pawn Hearts | Van der Graaf Generator | Progressive rock | Charisma | | Uncut's "The 500 Greatest Albums Of The 1970s": No. 105; 1000 Dischi Fondamentali: "200 Capolavori; The Guardian's "1000 Albums to Hear Before You Die"; Ondarock's Rock Milestones List |
| December 17, 1971 | Hunky Dory | David Bowie | Art pop; pop rock | RCA | | Rankings |
| December 1971 | Construção | Chico Buarque | MPB; samba | Philips Records | Widely regarded by music critics as one of the greatest Brazilian albums of all time. Heavily criticized the Brazilian military dictatorship, especially its censorship. | Acclaim and legacy Tom Moon's 1,000 Recordings to Hear Before You Die |
| 1971 | Pieces of a Man | Gil Scott-Heron | Soul; jazz-funk; progressive soul | Flying Dutchman | Regarded as having influenced the development of electronic dance music and hip hop. | FNAC's The 1000 Best Albums of All Time: #163; Treble's "The Top 150 Albums of the ’70s": #88; Uncut's "The 500 Greatest Albums Of The 1970s": #205; Blow Up's "The 600 Essential Albums"; Laut's List of Milestones |
| 1971 | In den Gärten Pharaos | Popol Vuh | Electronic; new-age | Pilz | | FACT's "The 100 Best Albums of the 1970s": No. 5; Hartbeat!'s Greatest Albums Of All Time: #99; Blow Up's "The 600 Essential Albums"; Ondarock's Rock Milestones List |
| 1971 | For Alto | Anthony Braxton | Jazz | Delmark Records | Generally recognized as one of the landmarks of free jazz and improvised music. The first jazz album composed solely of solo saxophone music, and regarded as among the greatest solo saxophone albums. | The New York Times' "The 100 (+ Another 100) Most Important Jazz Recordings"; The Penguin Guide to Jazz "Crown"; Tom Moon's 1,000 Recordings to Hear Before You Die; The Guardian's "1000 Albums to Hear Before You Die" |

=== 1972 ===
| Release Date | Album | Artist | Genre(s) | Label | Notes | Accolades |
|---|---|---|---|---|---|---|
| January 31, 1972 | Let's Stay Together | Al Green | Soul | Hi | | Critical reaction Tom Moon's 1,000 Recordings to Hear Before You Die |
| February 1, 1972 | Harvest | Neil Young | Folk rock; country rock | Reprise | | Critical reception |
| February 25, 1972 | Pink Moon | Nick Drake | Folk; indie folk | Island | Recorded with just Drake on vocals, acoustic guitar and a single piano melody overdubbed onto the title track, with lyrics often attributed to Drake's ongoing battle with depression. It is considered one of the darkest albums. | Accolades Uncut's "The 500 Greatest Albums Of The 1970s": No. 51 |
| February 1972 | Something/Anything? | Todd Rundgren | Rock; pop; R&B; psychedelia; avant-pop | Bearsville | Double album divided into four sections focused on different stylistic themes; the first three parts were recorded in the studio with Rundgren playing all instruments and singing all vocals in addition to producing. | Rolling Stone's "500 Greatest Albums of All Time": No. 396; Treble's "The Top 150 Albums of the ’70s": No. 51; Uncut's "The 500 Greatest Albums Of The 1970s": No. 65; Classic Rock & Metal Hammer's The 200 Greatest Albums of the 70's |
| March 30, 1972 | Machine Head | Deep Purple | Hard rock; heavy metal | Purple | Regarded as influential in the development of heavy metal. It is considered one of the heaviest albums. | Critical reception Accolades |
| March 1972 | Clube da Esquina | Milton Nascimento / Lô Borges | MPB; baroque pop; folk | EMI-Odeon | Regarded as among the greatest albums of Brazilian music. | Legacy and critical reception |
| April 24, 1972 | #1 Record | Big Star | Power pop; hard rock; folk rock; Southern rock | Ardent | Regarded as a seminal work in pop rock and power pop. | Number 1 Record |
| May 12, 1972 | Exile on Main St. | The Rolling Stones | Rock and roll; hard rock; country | Rolling Stones | | Accolades |
| May 23, 1972 | Sail Away | Randy Newman | Orchestral pop; piano rock | Reprise | | Rolling Stone's "500 Greatest Albums of All Time": No. 268; Robert Dimery's 1001 Albums You Must Hear Before You Die; Colin Larkin's All Time Top 1000 Albums: No. 582; Uncut's "The 500 Greatest Albums Of The 1970s": No. 156 |
| June 1, 1972 | Amazing Grace | Aretha Franklin | Gospel | Atlantic | Live album. | Rolling Stone's "500 Greatest Albums of All Time": No. 154; Paste's "The 300 Greatest Albums of All Time": No. 235; 33⅓ Installment; Grammy Hall of Fame Induction |
| June 16, 1972 | Roxy Music | Roxy Music | Glam rock; art rock; avant-pop | Island; Reprise | | Critical reception |
| June 16, 1972 | The Rise and Fall of Ziggy Stardust and the Spiders from Mars | David Bowie | Glam rock; proto-punk | RCA | Recognised as one of the most important and culturally impactful rock albums. | Rankings |
| June 1972 | 666 | Aphrodite's Child | Progressive rock; psychedelic rock; art rock | Vertigo | Double-LP concept album, ostensibly an adaptation of Biblical passages from the Book of Revelation. Regarded by many music critics as among the greatest progressive rock albums of all time. | Release and reception The Guardian's "1000 Albums to Hear Before You Die" |
| July 11, 1972 | Super Fly | Curtis Mayfield | Psychedelic soul; funk; progressive soul; cinematic soul | Curtom | One of the pioneering soul concept albums, including socially aware lyrics about poverty and drug abuse. Regarded as an influence to the hip hop and rap genres. | Reception, sales and legacy |
| September 8, 1972 | Close to the Edge | Yes | Progressive rock | Atlantic | | Reception and legacy |
| September 15, 1972 | Foxtrot | Genesis | Progressive rock | Charisma | | Epoca's The 100 Best Albums of All Time: #4; Uncut's "The 500 Greatest Albums Of The 1970s": No. 340; Classic Rock & Metal Hammer's The 200 Greatest Albums of the 70's; Laut's List of Milestones |
| September 1972 | Vol. 4 | Black Sabbath | Heavy metal | Vertigo | | Release and reception Classic Rock & Metal Hammer's The 200 Greatest Albums of the 70's |
| October 11, 1972 | On the Corner | Miles Davis | Jazz-funk; avant-funk; fusion; psychedelic funk; avant-garde jazz | Columbia | Praised for its experimental style, anticipating subsequent developments in funk, jazz, post-punk, electronica, and hip hop. | Uncut's "The 500 Greatest Albums Of The 1970s": No. 55; Pitchfork's "The 100 Best Albums of the 1970s": No. 84; Treble's "The Top 150 Albums of the ’70s": No. 56; FACT's "The 100 Best Albums of the 1970s": No. 11 |
| October 27, 1972 | Talking Book | Stevie Wonder | Progressive soul; funk; soul; rock; jazz | Tamla | | Rolling Stone's "500 Greatest Albums of All Time": No. 59; Colin Larkin's All Time Top 1000 Albums: No. 322; Treble's "The Top 150 Albums of the ’70s": No. 65; Uncut's "The 500 Greatest Albums Of The 1970s": No. 400 |
| November 8, 1972 | Transformer | Lou Reed | Glam rock; pop rock | RCA Victor | Incorporated controversial topics of sexual orientation, gender identity, prostitution, and drug use. | Critical reception |
| November 29, 1972 | Ege Bamyasi | Can | Krautrock; avant-funk; psychedelic rock; space rock | United Artists; Spoon Records | Helped popularize krautrock, and inspired several later musicians, particularly the electronic and post-punk scenes. | Accolades |
| November 1972 | Can't Buy a Thrill | Steely Dan | Jazz rock; pop rock; soft rock | ABC | | Critical reception Uncut's "The 500 Greatest Albums Of The 1970s": No. 297 |
| November 1972 | Will the Circle Be Unbroken | Nitty Gritty Dirt Band | Bluegrass; traditional country; appalachian folk music; gospel | United Artists | | Robert Dimery's 1001 Albums You Must Hear Before You Die; Tom Moon's 1,000 Recordings to Hear Before You Die; Grammy Hall of Fame Induction; Library of Congress' National Recording Registry |
| December 8, 1972 | Made in Japan | Deep Purple | Hard rock; heavy metal | Purple | | Accolades Classic Rock & Metal Hammer's The 200 Greatest Albums of the 70's |
| 1972 | Acabou Chorare | Novos Baianos | MPB; Samba rock; tropicália | Som Livre | Influential to many Brazilian musicians and bands due to its absence of a group hierarchy and focus on samba rhythm. | Acabou Chorare Reception |
| 1972 | Neu! | Neu! | Krautrock; experimental rock; psychedelic rock | Brain | Regarded as a seminal work of German experimental rock, and influential towards influence on subsequent ambient music and punk. | NME's "The 500 Greatest Albums of All Time": No. 163; Uncut's "The 500 Greatest Albums Of The 1970s": No. 14; FACT's "The 100 Best Albums of the 1970s": No. 36; Treble's "The Top 150 Albums of the ’70s": No. 83 |
| 1972 | Hosianna Mantra | Popol Vuh | Krautrock; chamber music; new-age; world music | Pilz | | Paste's "The 300 Greatest Albums of All Time": No. 251; Uncut's "The 500 Greatest Albums Of The 1970s": No. 307; Julian Cope's "50 Kosmische Classics"; Ondarock's Rock Milestones List |

=== 1973 ===
| Release Date | Album | Artist | Genre(s) | Label | Notes | Accolades |
|---|---|---|---|---|---|---|
| February 7, 1973 | Raw Power | Iggy and The Stooges | Proto-punk; hard rock; garage rock; punk rock | Columbia | Credited with pioneering punk rock, and being one, of if not the first punk rock album by some music critics. | Paste's "The 300 Greatest Albums of All Time": No. 90; NME's "The 500 Greatest Albums of All Time": No. 80; Treble's "The Top 150 Albums of the ’70s": No. 45; Pitchfork's "The 100 Best Albums of the 1970s": No. 83 |
| February 25, 1973 | Paris 1919 | John Cale | Art pop; baroque pop | Reprise | Highly regarded for its orchestral-influenced style and evocative lyrical imagery of various aspects of early 20th century Western Europe culture and history. | Legacy Uncut's "The 500 Greatest Albums Of The 1970s": No. 47 Rolling Stone Germany's The 500 Greatest Albums of All Time: #82 |
| February 1973 | Solid Air | John Martyn | Folk rock; folk jazz; folk; psychedelia | Island | | Reception Uncut's "The 500 Greatest Albums Of The 1970s": No. 61 |
| March 1, 1973 | The Dark Side of the Moon | Pink Floyd | Progressive rock; psychedelic rock | Harvest; Capitol | Regarded as a pivotal point in the history of rock music, and by many publications as its greatest album. | Rankings |
| March 2, 1973 | A Wizard, a True Star | Todd Rundgren | Progressive pop; psychedelia; avant-pop; R&B | Bearsville | Produced, engineered, and largely performed by Rundgren alone, who envisioned the album as a hallucinogenic-inspired "flight plan" with all the tracks segueing seamlessly into each other. | NME's "The 500 Greatest Albums of All Time": No. 189; Uncut's "The 500 Greatest Albums Of The 1970s": No. 73; Blow Up's "The 600 Essential Albums"; Robert Dimery's 1001 Albums You Must Hear Before You Die |
| March 6, 1973 | Closing Time | Tom Waits | Folk; jazz; blues | Asylum | | NME's "The 500 Greatest Albums of All Time": No. 341; Treble's "The Top 150 Albums of the ’70s": No. 88; Uncut's "The 500 Greatest Albums Of The 1970s": No. 396; Tom Moon's 1,000 Recordings to Hear Before You Die |
| March 23, 1973 | Larks' Tongues in Aspic | King Crimson | Progressive rock; avant-garde metal; free improvisation | Island; Atlantic | | Reception and legacy |
| March 23, 1973 | For Your Pleasure | Roxy Music | Art rock | Island; Warner Bros. | Regarded as one of the greatest glam rock and art rock albums of all time. | Critical reception |
| March 28, 1973 | Houses of the Holy | Led Zeppelin | Hard rock; art rock | Atlantic | | Release and reception |
| April 13, 1973 | Catch a Fire | The Wailers | Reggae; reggae rock; roots reggae | Tuff Gong/Island | Regarded as one of the top reggae albums of all time. | Critical reception Uncut's "The 500 Greatest Albums Of The 1970s": No. 106 FNAC's The 1000 Best Albums of All Time: #129 |
| April 19, 1973 | Aladdin Sane | David Bowie | Glam rock; hard rock | RCA | | Legacy |
| May 6, 1973 | Mekanïk Destruktïw Kommandöh | Magma | Zeuhl | A&M (most of the world); Vertigo (original French release); Mercury (French reissues) | | Rolling Stone France's 33rd greatest French Rock album; Classic Rock's 100 Greatest Albums of the 70s: #96; Uncut's "The 500 Greatest Albums Of The 1970s": No. 350; Rolling Stone's 50 Greatest Prog Rock Albums of All Time: #24 |
| May 11, 1973 | Space Ritual | Hawkwind | Space rock; psychedelic rock; progressive rock; proto-punk; hard rock | United Artists | | Robert Dimery's 1001 Albums You Must Hear Before You Die; The Guardian's "1000 Albums to Hear Before You Die"; FACT's "The 100 Best Albums of the 1970s": No. 17; Uncut's "The 500 Greatest Albums Of The 1970s": No. 240 |
| May 25, 1973 | Tubular Bells | Mike Oldfield | Progressive rock; instrumental rock; new-age music | Virgin | Consists of two mostly instrumental tracks written by 19-year-old Mike Oldfield, who played almost all the instruments. | Reception |
| July 26, 1973 | Tres Hombres | ZZ Top | Southern rock; blues rock; boogie rock; Texas blues | London | | Robert Dimery's 1001 Albums You Must Hear Before You Die; Rolling Stone's 500 Greatest Albums of All Time (2012): No. 490; Colin Larkin's All Time Top 1000 Albums: No. 501; Uncut's "The 500 Greatest Albums Of The 1970s": No. 424 |
| July 27, 1973 | New York Dolls | New York Dolls | Hard rock; proto-punk; glam rock; punk rock | Mercury | Regarded as a foundation for the late 1970s punk rock movement. | Professional rankings |
| July 1973 | Countdown to Ecstasy | Steely Dan | Rock; jazz rock; pop | ABC | | NME's "The 500 Greatest Albums of All Time": No. 310; Colin Larkin's All Time Top 1000 Albums: No. 295; Classic Rock's 100 Greatest Albums of the 70s: #27; Robert Dimery's 1001 Albums You Must Hear Before You Die |
| August 1, 1973 | Future Days | Can | Krautrock; space rock; ambient; electronic; progressive rock | United Artists | | Legacy |
| August 3, 1973 | Innervisions | Stevie Wonder | Progressive soul; funk; soul; rock; jazz | Tamla | Significantly influential on the sound of commercial soul and black music. | Legacy Grammy Hall of Fame in 1999 |
| August 13, 1973 | (Pronounced 'Lĕh-'nérd 'Skin-'nérd) | Lynyrd Skynyrd | Southern rock; hard rock; blues rock | MCA | | Rolling Stone's "500 Greatest Albums of All Time": No. 381; Classic Rock & Metal Hammer's The 200 Greatest Albums of the 70's; Robert Dimery's 1001 Albums You Must Hear Before You Die; Ondarock's Rock Milestones List |
| August 28, 1973 | Let's Get It On | Marvin Gaye | Soul; R&B | Tamla | Influenced the development of contemporary R&B and slow jams by incorporating vocal multi-tracking and complex instrumentation. | Accolades |
| September 21, 1973 | Faust IV | Faust | Krautrock | Virgin | | Pitchfork's "The 100 Best Albums of the 1970s": No. 69; Treble's "The Top 150 Albums of the ’70s": No. 111; Julian Cope's "50 Kosmische Classics"; Robert Dimery's 1001 Albums You Must Hear Before You Die |
| September, 1973 | Moontan | Golden Earring | Progressive rock; Hard Rock | Polydor; Track; MCA | | The 15 best Dutch albums of all Time: No. 1; The Top 50 Best Nederpop Albums of All Time: No. 9; Q & Mojo Top 40 Cosmic Rock Albums: No. 32 |
| October 5, 1973 | Goodbye Yellow Brick Road | Elton John | Pop rock; glam rock | DJM | Double album. | Legacy |
| October 5, 1973 | Berlin | Lou Reed | Rock; art rock; orchestral rock | RCA Victor | Rock opera about a doomed couple, addressing themes of drug use, prostitution, depression, domestic violence and suicide. It is considered one of the darkest albums. | Uncut's "The 500 Greatest Albums Of The 1970s": No. 60; Rolling Stone's 500 Greatest Albums of All Time (2012): No. 344; NME's "The 500 Greatest Albums of All Time": No. 498; Robert Dimery's 1001 Albums You Must Hear Before You Die |
| September 28, 1973 | Selling England by the Pound | Genesis | Progressive rock | Charisma; Atlantic | | Uncut's "The 500 Greatest Albums Of The 1970s": No. 206; Treble's "The Top 150 Albums of the ’70s": No. 115; FACT's "The 100 Best Albums of the 1970s": No. 37; Robert Dimery's 1001 Albums You Must Hear Before You Die |
| October 26, 1973 | Quadrophenia | The Who | Hard rock; art rock | Track (UK); Track/MCA (US) | Double concept album, regarded as influential towards the mod revival movement of the late 1970s. | Reception |
| October 26, 1973 | Head Hunters | Herbie Hancock | Jazz-funk; jazz fusion | Columbia | Considered to have brought jazz-funk fusion to mainstream attention. | Paste's "The 300 Greatest Albums of All Time": No. 130; Treble's "The Top 150 Albums of the ’70s": No. 36; Uncut's "The 500 Greatest Albums Of The 1970s": No. 90; Grammy Hall of Fame Induction; Library of Congress' National Recording Registry |
| October 1973 | Artaud | Pescado Rabioso | Art rock; folk | Talent-Microfón | Considered to be among most influential albums in Spanish-language rock music, and frequently ranked as the best greatest album in the history of Argentine rock. | Legacy |
| October 1973 | Marjory Razorblade | Kevin Coyne | Rock | Virgin | Double album. | Hartbeat!'s Greatest Albums Of All Time: #90; FACT's "The 100 Best Albums of the 1970s": #83; Blow Up's "The 600 Essential Albums"; The Guardian's "1000 Albums to Hear Before You Die" |
| November 5, 1973 | The Wild, the Innocent & the E Street Shuffle | Bruce Springsteen | Rock | Columbia | | Rolling Stone's "500 Greatest Albums of All Time": No. 345; Classic Rock's 100 Greatest Albums of the 70s: #27; Uncut's "The 500 Greatest Albums Of The 1970s": No. 221; The Guardian Writers' Favourite Albums Ever |
| November 30, 1973 | Band on the Run | Paul McCartney & Wings | Rock; pop rock | Apple | | Critical reception NME's "The 500 Greatest Albums of All Time": No. 333 |
| 1973 | Conference of the Birds | Dave Holland | Avant-garde jazz; free jazz; post-bop | ECM | Considered to be among the greatest avant-garde jazz releases. | The Penguin Guide to Jazz's "Core Collection"; The New York Times' "The 100 (+ Another 100) Most Important Jazz Recordings"; The Guardian's "1000 Albums to Hear Before You Die"; Tom Moon's 1,000 Recordings to Hear Before You Die |

=== 1974 ===
| Release Date | Album | Artist | Genre(s) | Label | Notes | Accolades |
|---|---|---|---|---|---|---|
| January 17, 1974 | Court and Spark | Joni Mitchell | Pop; soft rock; jazz pop; jazz-rock | Asylum | | Paste's "The 300 Greatest Albums of All Time": No. 208; Treble's "The Top 150 Albums of the ’70s": No. 68; 33⅓ Installment; Grammy Hall of Fame Induction |
| January 1974 | Grievous Angel | Gram Parsons | Country; country rock | Reprise | | NME's "The 500 Greatest Albums of All Time": No. 317; Colin Larkin's All Time Top 1000 Albums: No. 324; Rolling Stone's "500 Greatest Albums of All Time": No. 425; The Guardian's "1000 Albums to Hear Before You Die" |
| February 8, 1974 | Here Come the Warm Jets | Brian Eno | Art rock; avant-pop; glam rock; experimental pop; art pop; pop rock | Island | | Critical reception: NME's "The 500 Greatest Albums of All Time": No. 427; Uncut's "The 500 Greatest Albums Of The 1970s": No. 72; Treble's "The Top 150 Albums of the ’70s": No. 77 |
| February 20, 1974 | Radio City | Big Star | Power pop | Ardent | Recognized as a milestone album in the history of power pop music, and regarded by several music critics as its definitive album. | Reception |
| February 20, 1974 | Pretzel Logic | Steely Dan | Jazz rock; pop rock | ABC | | Critical reception Uncut's "The 500 Greatest Albums Of The 1970s": No. 127 |
| February 20, 1974 | Phaedra | Tangerine Dream | Electronic; kosmische; ambient; space music; progressive electronic | Virgin | Considered to have greatly influenced the Berlin School genre. | FACT's "The 100 Best Albums of the 1970s": No. 49; Uncut's "The 500 Greatest Albums Of The 1970s": No. 238; Epoca's The 100 Best Albums of All Time; Robert Dimery's 1001 Albums You Must Hear Before You Die |
| April 30, 1974 | I Want to See the Bright Lights Tonight | Richard & Linda Thompson | Folk rock; singer-songwriter | Island | | Reception Uncut's "The 500 Greatest Albums Of The 1970s": No. 37 |
| May 1, 1974 | Kimono My House | Sparks | Glam rock; art rock | Island | | Rolling Stone's "500 Greatest Albums of All Time": No. 476; Laut's Best Albums of the 1970s: No. 41; Blow Up's "The 600 Essential Albums"; Robert Dimery's 1001 Albums You Must Hear Before You Die |
| May 24, 1974 | Diamond Dogs | David Bowie | Glam rock; art rock; proto-punk; soul | RCA | Cited as an influence on the 1970s punk revolution and on future goth and industrial acts due to its nihilistic lyrical content and raw guitar style. | Uncut's "The 500 Greatest Albums Of The 1970s": No. 93; NME's "The 500 Greatest Albums of All Time": No. 447; Classic Rock & Metal Hammer's The 200 Greatest Albums of the 70's; 33⅓ Installment |
| July 19, 1974 | On the Beach | Neil Young | Country rock; blues rock | Reprise | | Reception |
| July 26, 1974 | Rock Bottom | Robert Wyatt | Art rock; Canterbury scene; progressive rock; psychedelic rock | Virgin | | FNAC's The 1000 Best Albums of All Time: #217; NME's "The 500 Greatest Albums of All Time": #358; Uncut's "The 500 Greatest Albums Of The 1970s": #34; Treble's "The Top 150 Albums of the ’70s": #145 |
| September 10, 1974 | Good Old Boys | Randy Newman | Roots rock; country rock | Reprise | | Rolling Stone's 500 Greatest Albums of All Time (2012): No. 394; Robert Dimery's 1001 Albums You Must Hear Before You Die; Colin Larkin's All Time Top 1000 Albums: No. 902; Uncut's "The 500 Greatest Albums Of The 1970s": #304 |
| October 6, 1974 | Red | King Crimson | Progressive rock; progressive metal; heavy metal | Island; Atlantic | Regarded as being highly influential to the development of avant-garde metal and math rock. It is considered one of the heaviest albums. | Legacy Uncut's "The 500 Greatest Albums Of The 1970s": No. 379 |
| October 25, 1974 | Crime of the Century | Supertramp | Art rock; progressive rock; pop | A&M | | Reception |
| October 25, 1974 | Natty Dread | Bob Marley & The Wailers | Reggae; reggae rock | Island/Tuff Gong | | NME's "The 500 Greatest Albums of All Time": No. 141; Rolling Stone's 500 Greatest Albums of All Time (2012): No. 181; Uncut's "The 500 Greatest Albums Of The 1970s": No. 385; Robert Dimery's 1001 Albums You Must Hear Before You Die |
| November 1, 1974 | Autobahn | Kraftwerk | Electronic pop; electroacoustic; kosmische | Philips | Regarded as one of the most influential and significant records in the history of electronic music. Features a 22-minute suite titled "Autobahn", reflecting a trip emulating the sounds of motor vehicle on the highway. | Rolling Stone's "40 Most Groundbreaking Albums of All Time"; FACT's "The 100 Best Albums of the 1970s": No. 21; Uncut's "The 500 Greatest Albums Of The 1970s": No. 137; Grammy Hall of Fame Induction |
| November 22, 1974 | The Lamb Lies Down on Broadway | Genesis | Progressive rock; art rock | Charisma; Atco | | Legacy Treble's "The Top 150 Albums of the ’70s": No. 94 Classic Rock & Metal Hammer's The 200 Greatest Albums of the 70's |
| November 1974 | Taking Tiger Mountain (By Strategy) | Brian Eno | Art rock; art pop; avant-pop; experimental rock | Island | Loose concept album that references themes of geopolitical intrigue ranging from espionage to the Chinese Communist Revolution. | Wiener's "100 Best Records of the [20th] Century": No. 64; Uncut's "The 500 Greatest Albums Of The 1970s": No. 330; Treble's Best 100 Albums of the 70s; FNAC's 300+ Best Albums in the History of Rock |
| 1974 | Zuckerzeit | Cluster | Electronic; avant-pop; kosmische; electronic pop; krautrock | Brain | Influential on future electronic releases in part due to its lo-fi approach. | FACT's "The 100 Best Albums of the 1970s": No. 13; Pitchfork's "The 100 Best Albums of the 1970s": No. 63; Julian Cope's "50 Kosmische Classics"; The World's Greatest Ever Electronic Music Albums |

=== 1975 ===
| Release Date | Album | Artist | Genre(s) | Label | Notes | Accolades |
|---|---|---|---|---|---|---|
| January 20, 1975 | Blood on the Tracks | Bob Dylan | Folk; folk rock | Columbia | | Paste's "The 300 Greatest Albums of All Time": No. 30; NME's "The 500 Greatest Albums of All Time": No. 36; Treble's "The Top 150 Albums of the ’70s": No. 42; Classic Rock & Metal Hammer's The 200 Greatest Albums of the 70's |
| February 24, 1975 | Physical Graffiti | Led Zeppelin | Hard rock | Swan Song | Double album. It is considered one of the heaviest albums. | Release and critical reception |
| February 1975 | Neu! '75 | Neu! | Krautrock; kosmische musik; experimental rock; psychedelic rock; proto-punk | Brain; United Artists | Regarded as a landmark in German experimental rock due to side one's electronic ambient tracks and side two's proto-punk. | NME's "The 500 Greatest Albums of All Time": No. 163; Uncut's "The 500 Greatest Albums Of The 1970s": No. 267; Tom Moon's 1,000 Recordings to Hear Before You Die; The Guardian's "1000 Albums to Hear Before You Die" |
| May 1975 | Red Headed Stranger | Willie Nelson | Country; outlaw country | Columbia | | Legacy |
| June 20, 1975 | Tonight's the Night | Neil Young | Country rock; blues rock | Reprise | | Rolling Stone's "500 Greatest Albums of All Time": No. 302; Uncut's "The 500 Greatest Albums Of The 1970s": No. 243; Ondarock's Rock Milestones List; Robert Dimery's 1001 Albums You Must Hear Before You Die |
| June 26, 1975 | The Basement Tapes | Bob Dylan & The Band | Roots rock; Americana; alternative country | Columbia | Considered a significant influence on Americana and alternative country due to its home-brew, unpolished recording distinct from contemporary acts in the 1960s. | Legacy Rolling Stone's "500 Greatest Albums of All Time": No. 335 Grammy Hall of Fame Induction |
| August 25, 1975 | Born to Run | Bruce Springsteen | Rock and roll; pop rock; R&B; folk rock | Columbia | Highly regarded for its Wall of Sound production and cinematic storytelling attributed with capturing the ideals of a generation of American youths during a decade of political turmoil, war, and issues for the working class. | Rankings |
| September 12, 1975 | Wish You Were Here | Pink Floyd | Progressive rock; art rock; experimental rock | Harvest; Columbia | | Reception |
| November 10, 1975 | Horses | Patti Smith | Punk rock; art punk; garage rock | Arista | Regarded as a seminal recording in the history of punk, and later rock movements such as new wave, alternative rock, indie rock, and grunge. | Legacy and influence |
| November 14, 1975 | Another Green World | Eno | Art pop; ambient; art rock; minimalist; ambient pop; avant-pop | Island | Regarded as a landmark and pioneering release for ambient and art-pop music due to its unorthodox use of the recording studio, directed improvisations, and electronic effects. | Legacy Treble's "The Top 150 Albums of the ’70s": No. 20 |
| November 28, 1975 | A Night at the Opera | Queen | Progressive rock; pop; heavy metal; hard rock; avant-pop | EMI; Elektra | Highly regarded for its elaborate production and incorporation of a vast range of styles, such as ballads, music hall, sea shanties, dixieland, hard rock and progressive rock influences. | Accolades |
| November 30, 1975 | The Köln Concert | Keith Jarrett | Jazz | ECM | The best-selling piano recording and the best-selling solo album in jazz history. | Legacy: FNAC's The 1000 Best Albums of All Time: #93; Uncut's "The 500 Greatest Albums Of The 1970s": #469; Grammy Hall of Fame Induction |
| November 1975 | The Hissing of Summer Lawns | Joni Mitchell | Folk jazz; art rock; jazz pop; avant-pop | Asylum | | Accolades |
| December 15, 1975 | Mothership Connection | Parliament | Funk; R&B; funk rock; disco; progressive soul | Casablanca; Def Jam | | Reception |
| 1975 | Bogalusa Boogie | Clifton Chenier | Zydeco | Arhoolie Records | | Grammy Hall of Fame Induction; Library of Congress' National Recording Registry; Stereophile's "40 Essential Albums"; Tom Moon's 1,000 Recordings to Hear Before You Die |

=== 1976 ===
| Release Date | Album | Artist | Genre(s) | Label | Notes | Accolades |
|---|---|---|---|---|---|---|
| January 5, 1976 | Desire | Bob Dylan | Folk rock | Columbia | | NME's "The 500 Greatest Albums of All Time": No. 143; Rolling Stone's 500 Greatest Albums of All Time (2012): No. 174; Uncut's "The 500 Greatest Albums Of The 1970s": No. 142; Classic Rock & Metal Hammer's The 200 Greatest Albums of the 70's |
| January 23, 1976 | Station to Station | David Bowie | Art rock; funk; R&B | RCA | | Rankings |
| March 1976 | 2112 | Rush | Progressive rock; progressive metal | Mercury | | Reception |
| March 1976 | Bright Size Life | Pat Metheny | Jazz; jazz fusion; Americana | ECM | | Library of Congress' National Recording Registry; The New York Times' "The 100 Most Important Jazz Recordings"; NPR's Basic Jazz Record Library; Jazzwise's "100 Jazz Albums That Shook the World" |
| April 23, 1976 | Ramones | Ramones | Punk rock | Sire | Critically considered as having established the musical genre of punk rock, while influencing additional genres such as heavy metal, thrash metal, indie pop, grunge, and post-punk. | Paste's "The 300 Greatest Albums of All Time": No. 123; Uncut's "The 500 Greatest Albums Of The 1970s": No. 16; Treble's "The Top 150 Albums of the ’70s": No. 52; Classic Rock & Metal Hammer's The 200 Greatest Albums of the 70's |
| May 15, 1976 | Fly Like an Eagle | Steve Miller Band | Space rock; blues rock; pop rock | Capitol; Mercury | | Rolling Stone's 500 Greatest Albums of All Time (2012): No. 445; The Guardian's "1000 Albums to Hear Before You Die"; Colin Larkin's All Time Top 1000 Albums: No. 400; Library of Congress' National Recording Registry |
| August 25, 1976 | Boston | Boston | Hard rock; arena rock | Epic | Regarded as having led the transition of mainstream American rock from blues-based proto-metal to power pop alongside advanced production values. | Rock and Roll Hall of Fame's "Definitive 200": No. 43; Classic Rock & Metal Hammer's The 200 Greatest Albums of the 70's; Treble's "The Top 150 Albums of the ’70s": No. 139; Robert Dimery's 1001 Albums You Must Hear Before You Die |
| August 1976 | The Modern Lovers | The Modern Lovers | Proto-punk; garage rock; art rock | Beserkley | Considered a significant inspiration for punk rock. | Rolling Stone's "500 Greatest Albums of All Time": No. 288; NME's "The 500 Greatest Albums of All Time": No. 289; Uncut's "The 500 Greatest Albums Of The 1970s": No. 21; 33⅓ Installment |
| September 28, 1976 | Songs in the Key of Life | Stevie Wonder | R&B; soul; pop; progressive soul; soul jazz | Tamla | | Legacy and influence |
| October 11, 1976 | Arrival | ABBA | Pop; euro disco | Polar; Epic | | Rolling Stone Germany's Top 500 Albums of All Time (2004): #245; NME's "The 500 Greatest Albums of All Time": No. 441; Robert Dimery's 1001 Albums You Must Hear Before You Die; Library of Congress' National Recording Registry |
| November 22, 1976 | Hejira | Joni Mitchell | Folk rock; folk jazz | Asylum | | Rolling Stone's "500 Greatest Albums of All Time": No. 133; Paste's "The 300 Greatest Albums of All Time": No. 249; Wiener's "100 Best Records of the [20th] Century": No. 44; Robert Dimery's 1001 Albums You Must Hear Before You Die |
| December 8, 1976 | Hotel California | Eagles | Rock | Asylum | | Accolades |
| December 1976 | Oxygène | Jean-Michel Jarre | Electronic; ambient; synth-pop; space music; new-age; electropop | Disques Motors/Polydor | Regarded as having popularized the rise of synthesizers in music. | Accolades |
| 1976 | King Tubbys Meets Rockers Uptown | Augustus Pablo | Dub; reggae | *Yard International *Clocktower | Regarded as one of the best and most influential dub albums | Critical reception |
| 1976 | Music from the Penguin Cafe | Penguin Cafe Orchestra | Pop | E.G. | | Uncut's "The 500 Greatest Albums Of The 1970s"; Blow Up's "The 600 Essential Albums"; Le Mot et le Reste's Musiques, Traverses & Horizons en 400 Disques; Robert Dimery's 1001 Albums You Must Hear Before You Die |

=== 1977 ===
| Release Date | Album | Artist | Genre(s) | Label | Notes | Accolades |
|---|---|---|---|---|---|---|
| January 14, 1977 | Low | David Bowie | Art rock; avant-pop; electronic; ambient; experimental rock | RCA | Highly acclaimed for its originality and cited as an influence on the post-punk and post-rock genres. | Rankings |
| February 4, 1977 | Rumours | Fleetwood Mac | Pop rock; soft rock | Warner Bros. | | Legacy |
| February 8, 1977 | Marquee Moon | Television | Rock; post-punk; art punk; new wave; punk rock; garage rock | Elektra | Regarded a foundational record of alternative rock, due to its innovative instrumentation involving rock and jazz-inspired interplay, melodic lines, and counter-melodies. Strongly influenced subsequent post-punk, new wave, and indie rock movements of the 1980s, and rock guitar playing in general. | Reappraisal |
| February 18, 1977 | Damned Damned Damned | The Damned | Punk rock; garage rock | Stiff | The first full-length album released by a UK punk group. | Laut's Best Albums of the 1970s: No. 89; Classic Rock & Metal Hammer's The 200 Greatest Albums of the 70's; Tom Moon's 1,000 Recordings to Hear Before You Die; The Guardian's "1000 Albums to Hear Before You Die" |
| February 21, 1977 | (I'm) Stranded | The Saints | Punk rock | EMI (Australia); Harvest (original UK release); Sire (original US release) | | Accolades |
| March 18, 1977 | The Idiot | Iggy Pop | Art rock; post-punk | RCA Victor | Regarded as a significant influence on post-punk, industrial, and gothic rock artists. | NME's "The 500 Greatest Albums of All Time": No. 467; Treble's "The Top 150 Albums of the ’70s": No. 88; Uncut's "The 500 Greatest Albums Of The 1970s": No. 101; Robert Dimery's 1001 Albums You Must Hear Before You Die |
| March 1977 | Heavy Weather | Weather Report | Jazz fusion | Columbia | | Legacy Jazzwise's "100 Jazz Albums That Shook the World" |
| March 1977 | Trans-Europa Express | Kraftwerk | Electronic; synth-pop; experimental pop; avant-garde | Kling Klang | Regarded as one of the most influential and significant albums of all time due to its use of minimalistic arrangements, mechanized rhythms, and custom-built sequencers, influencing subsequent electronic, hip-hop, post-punk, and other genres of music. | Accolades |
| April 8, 1977 | The Clash | The Clash | Punk rock | CBS | | Reception |
| April 15, 1977 | Rattus Norvegicus | The Stranglers | Punk rock; new wave; pub rock; art punk | United Artists (UK); A&M (US) | | Reception and legacy |
| June 3, 1977 | Exodus | Bob Marley & the Wailers | Reggae | Island | | Critical reception Uncut's "The 500 Greatest Albums Of The 1970s": No. 125 |
| July 22, 1977 | My Aim Is True | Elvis Costello | New wave; pub rock; punk rock; power pop | Stiff; Columbia | | Rankings |
| September 9, 1977 | Lust for Life | Iggy Pop | Garage rock; hard rock; proto-punk; new wave | RCA | | Aftermath and legacy |
| September 16, 1977 | Talking Heads: 77 | Talking Heads | New wave; art rock; art-punk | Sire | | Rolling Stone's 500 Greatest Albums of All Time (2012): No. 291; Uncut's "The 500 Greatest Albums Of The 1970s": No. 109; Robert Dimery's 1001 Albums You Must Hear Before You Die; Tom Moon's 1,000 Recordings to Hear Before You Die |
| September 23, 1977 | Aja | Steely Dan | Jazz rock; pop rock; yacht rock; blue-eyed soul | ABC | Lauded by critics and audiophiles as among the most well-produced albums. | Accolades |
| September 29, 1977 | The Stranger | Billy Joel | Rock; soft rock; pop rock | Columbia | | Reception |
| September 30, 1977 | New Boots and Panties!! | Ian Dury | Punk rock; pub rock; disco; music hall | Stiff | | Accolades |
| October 3, 1977 | L.A.M.F. | The Heartbreakers | Punk rock; rock and roll | Track | | Rolling Stone Germany's Top 500 Albums of All Time (2004): No. 267; NME's "The 500 Greatest Albums of All Time": No. 396; Classic Rock's 100 Greatest Albums of the 70s: #96; Musikexpress's 33 1/3 Best Punk Albums |
| October 14, 1977 | "Heroes" | David Bowie | Art rock; experimental rock; electronic; ambient | RCA | It is considered one of the darkest albums. | Legacy |
| October 21, 1977 | Bat Out of Hell | Meat Loaf | Wagnerian rock | Cleveland International; Epic | Regarded as the first Wagnerian rock album due to its elaborate compositions, as well as its dense Wall of Sound-inspired production by Todd Rundgren. | Legacy |
| October 24, 1977 | Out of the Blue | Electric Light Orchestra | Progressive pop; orchestral pop; art rock | Jet; United Artists; CBS | | Colin Larkin's All Time Top 1000 Albums: No. 346; Treble's "The Top 150 Albums of the ’70s": No. 109; Robert Dimery's 1001 Albums You Must Hear Before You Die; Classic Rock & Metal Hammer's The 200 Greatest Albums of the 70's |
| October 28, 1977 | Never Mind the Bollocks, Here's the Sex Pistols | Sex Pistols | Punk rock | Virgin (UK); Warner Bros. (US) | Regarded as one of, if not the most influential punk rock albums due to its energy and vocal delivery. | Legacy |
| November 4, 1977 | Rocket to Russia | Ramones | Punk rock; pop punk; surf punk | Sire | | Rolling Stone's 500 Greatest Albums of All Time (2012): No. 106; Pitchfork's "The 100 Best Albums of the 1970s": No. 59; Uncut's "The 500 Greatest Albums Of The 1970s": No. 154; Ondarock's Rock Milestones List |
| November 1977 | Pink Flag | Wire | Punk rock; art punk; post-punk | Harvest | Regarded as a landmark in the development of post-punk, hardcore, alternative rock, and Britpop music. | Legacy |
| November 15, 1977 | Saturday Night Fever | Various Artists | Disco | RSO Records | Double soundtrack album to Saturday Night Fever, regarded as having epitomized the disco phenomenon. | Reception and legacy |
| December 28, 1977 | Suicide | Suicide | Synth-punk; electronic rock; synth-pop; electronic; minimalist | Red Star | Considered a uniquely "monolithic" album due to its minimalist electronics and harsh, repetitive rhythms, especially on the song Frankie Teardrop. It is considered one of the heaviest and darkest albums. | Reception |
| December 1977 | Before and After Science | Brian Eno | Art rock; art pop; avant-pop; experimental pop | Island; Polydor | | Rolling Stone Germany's Top 500 Albums of All Time (2004): #266; Uncut's "The 500 Greatest Albums Of The 1970s": No. 75; Pitchfork's "The 100 Best Albums of the 1970s": No. 100; Tom Moon's 1,000 Recordings to Hear Before You Die |
| 1977 | Zombie | Fela Kuti & Africa 70 | Afrobeat | Coconut | | Critical reception FNAC's The 1000 Best Albums of All Time: #224 |
| 1977 | Heart of the Congos | The Congos | Roots reggae | Black Ark | | NME's "100 Best Albums of All Time": No. 99; Rolling Stone Germany's Top 500 Albums of All Time (2023): #309; Pitchfork's "The 100 Best Albums of the 1970s": No. 46; Uncut's "The 500 Greatest Albums Of The 1970s": No. 204 |

=== 1978 ===
| Release Date | Album | Artist | Genre(s) | Label | Notes | Accolades |
|---|---|---|---|---|---|---|
| February 10, 1978 | Van Halen | Van Halen | Hard rock; heavy metal; glam metal | Warner Bros. | Regarded by some critics as the progenitor of glam metal, with the instrumental "Eruption" helping to popularize two-handed tapping. | Legacy |
| February 17, 1978 | The Kick Inside | Kate Bush | Art pop; progressive pop; baroque pop; art rock; progressive rock | EMI (UK); Harvest (US & Canada); Sonopresse (France); Portrait (Israel) | | NME's "The 500 Greatest Albums of All Time": No. 209; Treble's "The Top 150 Albums of the ’70s": No. 89; Uncut's "The 500 Greatest Albums Of The 1970s": No. 99; Classic Rock & Metal Hammer's The 200 Greatest Albums of the 70's |
| February 1978 | The Modern Dance | Pere Ubu | Art punk; post-punk; experimental rock | Blank | | Uncut's "The 500 Greatest Albums Of The 1970s": No. 324; Treble's "The Top 150 Albums of the ’70s": No. 149; FACT's "The 100 Best Albums of the 1970s": No. 31; Ondarock's Rock Milestones List |
| March 17, 1978 | This Year's Model | Elvis Costello | New wave; power pop; punk rock; pop rock; garage rock | Radar; Columbia | Acclaimed as an influential album regarding the evolution of punk rock towards new wave. | Rankings |
| March 18, 1978 | Third | Big Star | Power pop; alternative rock | PVC | Has become a cult album due to its "starkly personal, often experimental, and by turns beautiful and haunting songs", while documenting the band's deterioration as well as the declining mental state of singer and songwriter Alex Chilton in part due to the band's lack of commercial success. It is considered one of the darkest albums. | Accolades |
| March 1978 | Ambient 1: Music for Airports | Brian Eno | Ambient; minimalist; electronic | E.G.; Polydor; PVC | Credited with coining the term "ambient music" and defining the genre. | Legacy |
| April 28, 1978 | Die Mensch-Maschine | Kraftwerk | Synth-pop; electropop; new wave | | Broad concept album of themes from the Cold War, Germany's fascination with manufacturing, and humankind's increasingly symbiotic relationship with machines. Critically regarded as the catalyst for the synth-pop "revolution" that followed its release and early new wave electro-pop. | NME's "The 500 Greatest Albums of All Time": No. 57; Laut's Best Albums of the 1970s: No. 1; Uncut's "The 500 Greatest Albums Of The 1970s": No. 26; Wiener's "100 Best Records of the [20th] Century": No. 48 |
| April 1978 | Music for 18 Musicians | Steve Reich | Minimalism | ECM New Series | Regarded as one of the best works of minimalism and modern classical music. | FACT's "The 100 Best Albums of the 1970s": No. 35; Pitchfork's "The 100 Best Albums of the 1970s": No. 46; Treble's "The Top 150 Albums of the ’70s": No. 61; Uncut's "The 500 Greatest Albums Of The 1970s": No. 397 |
| April 1978 | The Only Ones | The Only Ones | Power pop; new wave; punk rock | Columbia | | Uncut's "200 Greatest Albums Of All Time": No. 109; Hartbeat!'s Greatest Albums Of All Time: #36; The Guardian's "1000 Albums to Hear Before You Die"; Robert Dimery's 1001 Albums You Must Hear Before You Die |
| June 2, 1978 | Darkness on the Edge of Town | Bruce Springsteen | Rock; hard rock; heartland rock | Columbia | | Rankings |
| June 6, 1978 | The Cars | The Cars | New wave; power pop; synth-rock | Elektra | | Reception and legacy Uncut's "The 500 Greatest Albums Of The 1970s": No. 306 |
| June 9, 1978 | Some Girls | The Rolling Stones | Rock | Rolling Stones | | Critical reception and legacy |
| June 9, 1978 | Dire Straits | Dire Straits | Blues rock; pub rock | Vertigo; Warner Bros.; Mercury | | Rolling Stone Germany's Top 500 Albums of All Time (2004): No. 376; Classic Rock & Metal Hammer's The 200 Greatest Albums of the 70's; Robert Dimery's 1001 Albums You Must Hear Before You Die; Ondarock's Rock Milestones List |
| June 1978 | Real Life | Magazine | Post-punk; new wave; art rock | Virgin | Considered a pioneering post-punk album. | Legacy |
| July 14, 1978 | More Songs About Buildings and Food | Talking Heads | New wave; art punk; avant-pop; post-punk; psychedelic funk | Sire | | Reception |
| August 28, 1978 | Q: Are We Not Men? A: We Are Devo! | Devo | New wave; post-punk; art rock; punk rock | Warner Bros. (US); Virgin (UK) | | Legacy Treble's "The Top 150 Albums of the ’70s": No. 98 |
| September 8, 1978 | Chairs Missing | Wire | Post-punk; art punk; avant-pop | Harvest | Regarded as a crucial landmark in the evolution of punk into post-punk and goth, and a seminal avant-pop release. | Paste's "The 300 Greatest Albums of All Time": No. 271; NME's "The 500 Greatest Albums of All Time": No. 394; Treble's "The Top 150 Albums of the ’70s": No. 136; Uncut's "The 500 Greatest Albums Of The 1970s": No. 362 |
| September 8, 1978 | Parallel Lines | Blondie | New wave; pop rock; power pop; disco | Chrysalis | | Reception and legacy |
| September 22, 1978 | One Nation Under A Groove | Funkadelic | Funk; rock; R&B; Psychedelic Soul | Warner Bros. | | Reception and legacy |
| November 3, 1978 | All Mod Cons | The Jam | New wave; mod revival; punk rock; power pop | Polydor | | Reception Uncut's "The 500 Greatest Albums Of The 1970s": No. 235 |
| November 10, 1978 | Germfree Adolescents | X-Ray Spex | Punk rock; new wave | EMI | | Paste's "The 300 Greatest Albums of All Time": No. 167; NME's "The 500 Greatest Albums of All Time": No. 180; Uncut's "The 500 Greatest Albums Of The 1970s": No. 381; Treble's "The Top 150 Albums of the ’70s": No. 140 |
| November 13, 1978 | The Scream | Siouxsie and the Banshees | Post-punk | Polydor | Acclaimed as a pioneering post-punk album and a landmark of the genre | Robert Dimery's "1001 Albums You Must Hear Before You Die" (Updated 2018): #no order; Gary Mulholland's "261 Greatest Albums Since Punk and Disco" (2006): #no order; Mojo's - "Mojo 1000, the Ultimate CD Buyers Guide" (2001); NME's "All Times Top 100 Albums" (1985): No. 57; Sounds's – "The 100 Best Albums of All Time" (1985): No. 34 |
| 1978 | No New York | Contortions; Teenage Jesus and the Jerks; Mars; DNA | No wave; avant-garde | Antilles | Compiled by Brian Eno to document the No wave scene in New York City, naming and helping to define the movement. | FACT's "The 100 Best Albums of the 1970s": No. 68; Blender's "The 100 Greatest Indie-Rock Albums Ever": No. 65; Ondarock's Rock Milestones List; Blow Up's "The 600 Essential Albums" |

=== 1979 ===
| Release Date | Album | Artist | Genre(s) | Label | Notes | Accolades |
|---|---|---|---|---|---|---|
| January 5, 1979 | Armed Forces | Elvis Costello and The Attractions | New wave; post-punk | Radar; Columbia | | Rankings |
| January 22, 1979 | We Are Family | Sister Sledge | Disco; R&B | Cotillion | | Robert Dimery's 1001 Albums You Must Hear Before You Die; The Guardian's "1000 Albums to Hear Before You Die"; NME's "The 500 Greatest Albums of All Time": No. 340; Uncut's "The 500 Greatest Albums Of The 1970s": No. 171 |
| February 2, 1979 | Inflammable Material | Stiff Little Fingers | Punk rock | Rough Trade | Much of the album details the grim reality of life in Northern Ireland in times of polarisation and conflict, with songs containing themes such as teenage boredom, deprivation, sectarian violence and police brutality. | FACT's "The 100 Best Albums of the 1970s": No. 57; Rolling Stone Germany's Top 500 Albums of All Time (2004): No. 412; The Guardian's "1000 Albums to Hear Before You Die"; Blow Up's "The 600 Essential Albums" |
| February 28, 1979 | Rickie Lee Jones | Rickie Lee Jones | Rock; R&B; jazz | Warner Bros. | | Rolling Stone Germany's Top 500 Albums of All Time (2004): No. 273; Uncut's "The 500 Greatest Albums Of The 1970s": No. 345; NPR's "The 150 Greatest Albums Made By Women"; 1000 Dischi Fondamentali: "300 Imperdibili" |
| March 16, 1979 | Breakfast in America | Supertramp | Progressive pop; art rock; soft rock | A&M | | Accolades |
| April 20, 1979 | Y | The Pop Group | Post-punk; avant-funk; dub; experimental | Radar | | Accolades |
| May 1979 | The Undertones | The Undertones | Punk rock; pop punk | Sire | | Accolades |
| June 15, 1979 | Unknown Pleasures | Joy Division | Post-punk; new wave; punk rock | Factory | Significantly influential on post-punk and related genres due to its uniquely gothic, bleak, and "claustrophobic" essence. | Accolades |
| June 22, 1979 | Rust Never Sleeps | Neil Young & Crazy Horse | Folk rock; hard rock; proto-grunge | Reprise | Live album. Widely considered a precursor of grunge music, with the bands Nirvana and Pearl Jam having cited Young's heavily distorted and abrasive guitar style on the B side to this album as an inspiration. | Critical reception |
| July 6, 1979 | The B-52's | The B-52's | New wave; post-punk; dance-rock; surf rock; college rock | Warner Bros. (US, Canada, Australia); Island (EU, Japan) | | Critical reception |
| July 27, 1979 | Highway to Hell | AC/DC | Hard rock; blues rock | Albert; Atlantic | Generally considered one of the greatest hard rock albums ever made. | Reception |
| July 30, 1979 | Risqué | Chic | Disco; soul; funk | Atlantic | | Accolades |
| August 3, 1979 | Fear of Music | Talking Heads | New wave; post-punk; art rock; psychedelic funk | Sire | | Accolades |
| August 10, 1979 | Off the Wall | Michael Jackson | Disco; funk; pop; R&B | Epic; CBS | Regarded as a landmark release of the disco era. | Rankings |
| August 17, 1979 | Drums and Wires | XTC | New wave; art pop; art rock | Virgin | Highly regarded for its use of "clever humor... powerful rhythms, and angular, mainly minimalistic arrangements". | Critical reception: Tom Moon's 1,000 Recordings to Hear Before You Die; Blow Up's "The 600 Essential Albums" |
| September 7, 1979 | Cut | The Slits | Post-punk; dub-reggae; art pop | Island | | Accolades |
| September 25, 1979 | Solid State Survivor | Yellow Magic Orchestra | Electronic; synth-pop | Alfa | Considered an early example of synth-pop, and a pioneering release in the development of techno. | Rolling Stone Japan's "100 Greatest Japanese Rock Albums": No. 4; Bookoff Online's "100 Japanese Music Masterpieces": No. 93; The Guardian's "1000 Albums to Hear Before You Die"; Ondarock's Rock Milestones List |
| September 25, 1979 | Entertainment! | Gang of Four | Post-punk; dance-punk; art punk; funk-punk | EMI; Warner Bros. | Considered a seminal album in the post-punk movement, and key album in the genres of dance-punk, art punk and funk-punk. | Reception |
| September 1979 | 154 | Wire | Post-punk; art punk; avant-pop | Harvest | Greatly influential due to its abstract, complex, and experimental arrangements of guitar effects, synthesizers and electronics. "The 15th" is regarded as one of the earliest and most crucial examples of shoegaze. It is considered one of the darkest albums. | Pitchfork's "The 100 Best Albums of the 1970s": No. 85; Uncut's "The 500 Greatest Albums Of The 1970s": No. 172; Ondarock's Rock Milestones List; Blow Up's "The 600 Essential Albums" |
| September 1979 | This Heat | This Heat | Experimental rock; post-punk | Piano | Regarded as a seminal work integral in shaping the genres of post-punk, avant rock and post-rock. | Uncut's "The 500 Greatest Albums Of The 1970s": No. 169; Treble's "The Top 150 Albums of the ’70s": No. 110; The Guardian's "1000 Albums to Hear Before You Die"; Blow Up's "The 600 Essential Albums" |
| October 5, 1979 | Reggatta de Blanc | The Police | New wave; reggae rock; post-punk | A&M | | Reception and legacy Treble's "The Top 150 Albums of the ’70s": No. 108 |
| October 12, 1979 | Tusk | Fleetwood Mac | Pop rock; avant-pop | Warner Bros. | Double album. | NME's "The 500 Greatest Albums of All Time": No. 445; Treble's "The Top 150 Albums of the ’70s": No. 67; Uncut's "The 500 Greatest Albums Of The 1970s": No. 170; Classic Rock & Metal Hammer's The 200 Greatest Albums of the 70's |
| October 19, 1979 | One Step Beyond... | Madness | 2 Tone; ska; rocksteady; new wave; R&B | Stiff (Europe); Sire (North America) | Considered to be instrumental in popularizing 2 tone music in the United Kingdom. | Rolling Stone Germany's Top 500 Albums of All Time (2004): No. 412; FNAC's The 1000 Best Albums of All Time: #159; Laut's Best Albums of the 1970s: #82; 33⅓ Installment |
| October 19, 1979 | The Specials | The Specials | Ska; reggae; 2 Tone; punk rock; new wave | 2 Tone | Regarded by several critics as some as a defining album of the UK ska scene. | Legacy |
| October 19, 1979 | Damn the Torpedoes | Tom Petty and the Heartbreakers | Heartland rock; rock and roll | Backstreet | | Rolling Stone's "500 Greatest Albums of All Time": No. 231; Colin Larkin's All Time Top 1000 Albums: No. 537; Laut's Best Albums of the 1970s: No. 89; Ultimate Classic Rock's "Top 100 ’70s Rock Albums" |
| October 1979 | (GI) | Germs | Punk rock; hardcore punk | Slash | Often considered the first full-length hardcore punk album. | NME's "101 Albums to Hear Before You Die": No. 90; Paste's "The 300 Greatest Albums of All Time": No. 227; 1000 Dischi Fondamentali: "200 Capolavori"; Robert Dimery's 1001 Albums You Must Hear Before You Die |
| November 21, 1979 | The Raincoats | The Raincoats | Post-punk; experimental rock; art punk; folk punk | Rough Trade | Considered influential in setting the groundwork for the riot grrrlmovement, and in shaping the use of lo-fi in recordings. | Reception 33⅓ Installment |
| November 23, 1979 | Metal Box | Public Image Ltd | Post-punk; experimental rock; dub; avant-garde; dance | Virgin | Regarded as among the best post-punk albums characterized by John Lydon's cryptic lyrics, propulsive dub-inspired rhythms led by bassist Jah Wobble, and an abrasive, "metallic" guitar sound developed by guitarist Keith Levene. It is considered one of the heaviest and darkest albums. | Critical reception |
| November 30, 1979 | The Wall | Pink Floyd | Progressive rock; art rock; progressive pop | Harvest/EMI; Columbia/CBS | Double album rock opera surrounding the life of a fictional jaded rock star, as he constructs a psychological "wall" of social isolation. One of the best known concept albums. | Release and reception |
| December 14, 1979 | London Calling | The Clash | Punk rock; new wave; post-punk | CBS; Epic | | Reappraisal and legacy |
| December 1979 | 20 Jazz Funk Greats | Throbbing Gristle | Industrial; synth-pop; experimental pop; electropop | Industrial | Considered to be one of the best industrial music albums of all time. | NME's "The 500 Greatest Albums of All Time": No. 401; FACT's "The 100 Best Albums of the 1970s": No. 1; Treble's "The Top 150 Albums of the ’70s": No. 43; 33⅓ Installment |

== See also ==
- List of 1960s albums considered the best
- List of 1980s albums considered the best
- List of 1990s albums considered the best
- List of best-selling albums
- Lists of fastest-selling albums
