= Ghost Rider (Suicide song) =

Song by Suicide

from the album Suicide
- Released: December 1977
- Studio: Ultima Sound, New York City
- Genre: Synth-punk
- Length: 2:34
- Label: Red Star
- Songwriters: Martin Rev; Alan Vega
- Producers: Craig Leon; Marty Thau

Suicide track listing
- 7 tracks: 1. "Ghost Rider"; 2. "Rocket U.S.A.; 3. "Cheree"; 4. "Johnny"; 5. "Girl"; 6. "Frankie Teardrop"; 7. "Ché"

"Ghost Rider" is a song by the protopunk band Suicide appearing on their 1977 debut album Suicide. The song is based on the Marvel Comics Ghost Rider character, which vocalist Alan Vega said "was my favorite comic because it had all these religious, metaphysical things going on in it."

In 1981, Suicide's lead vocalist Alan Vega re-recorded the song for his second solo album, Collision Drive. Vega later expressed his wish that the original version of the song would be used in the 2007 Ghost Rider film based on the comic, but that did not happen.

== Reception ==
The Atlantic said, "Vega gibbers and swoons over a filthy, driving three-note electronic riff: America, America is killin' its youth. What can you do but follow this trail of incineration across the sky?"

== Accolades ==
Year	Publication	Country	Accolade	Rank
2006	Les Inrockuptibles	France	1000 Indispensable Songs	*
2010	Rolling Stone	Germany	The 50 Best Songs of the 1970s	*
2012	NME	United Kingdom	100 Best Songs of the 1970s	71
2014	Robert Dimery	United States	1,001 Songs You Must Hear Before You Die	*
2016	Pitchfork	United States	The 200 Best Songs of the 1970s	92

(*) designates unordered lists.

== Personnel ==
Adapted from the Suicide liner notes.

Suicide

- Martin Rev – keyboards, drum programming
- Alan Vega – vocals

Production and additional personnel

- Larry Alexander – engineering
- Craig Leon – production
- Marty Thau – production

== Cover versions ==
R.E.M. recorded a cover version in 1989, which was released as a B-side of the "Orange Crush" single and later was included on The Automatic Box compilation. Double J in Australia described R.E.M.'s version as a "surprising cover for a jangle-pop band". Years earlier, the Henry Rollins Band "delivered a pummelling and epic hard rock rendering" of the song in 1982, "a great tribute to the pure punk aesthetic" of Suicide.
