= Johnny (Suicide song) =

1977 single by American band Suicide

Single by Suicide

from the album Suicide
- B-side: "Solid Gold"
- Released: 1977
- Recorded: November 1977
- Label: Red Star
- Songwriters: Martin Rev; Alan Vega
- Producer: Craig Leon

Suicide track listing
- 7 tracks: 1. "Ghost Rider"; 2. "Rocket U.S.A.; 3. "Cheree"; 4. "Johnny"; 5. "Girl"; 6. "Frankie Teardrop"; 7. "Ché"

"Johnny" is the first single by American musical duo Suicide from their 1977 self-titled album.

== Peaches version ==
"Jonny"

Single by Peaches
- Released: August 30, 2010
- Genre: Electro, Rock
- Length: 2:01
- Label: Blast First Petite
- Songwriters: Martin Rev, Alan Vega
- Producer: Peaches

Peaches singles chronology
"I Feel Cream" (2009)	"Jonny" (2010)

The Canadian electronic musician Peaches covered the song in 2010, retitled as "Jonny". The song was commissioned as part of a musical tribute series to Alan Vega, the lead singer from the band Suicide. Other musicians who have contributed to the tribute series include The Horrors, Primal Scream, Klaxons and Bruce Springsteen. Her version was released as a limited-edition 10-inch vinyl, along with Effi Briest's "Universe" and Alan Vega's "No Tomorrow".

=== Critical reception ===
Robin Murray of Clash Music describes "Jonny" as a "striking cover" enhanced by Peaches' "own feminine charm".

=== Track listing ===
1. "Jonny" – 2:01
2. "Universe" (Effi Briest) – 6:01
3. "No Tomorrow" (Alan Vega) - 3:58
