= Frankie Teardrop =

Song by Suicide

from the album Suicide
- Released: December 1977
- Genre: Synth-punk; electro-rockabilly; proto-punk
- Length: 10:26
- Label: Red Star
- Songwriters: Alan Vega; Martin Rev
- Producers: Craig Leon; Martin Thau

Suicide track listing
- 7 tracks: 1. "Ghost Rider"; 2. "Rocket U.S.A.; 3. "Cheree"; 4. "Johnny"; 5. "Girl"; 6. "Frankie Teardrop"; 7. "Ché"

"Frankie Teardrop" is a song by Suicide from the band's self-titled debut album, released in 1977.

== Lyrics and content ==
The song tells a story of a 20-year-old husband, father, and poverty-stricken factory worker whose destitution drives him to insanity. One day, Frankie comes home from work, murders his wife and child, and dies by suicide. The narrative then continues to follow him into Hell.

The musical backing on the song is sparse, featuring mostly a simple two-note keyboard riff, and repetitive drum machine pattern. Alan Vega's lyrics were improvised based on a news story, and are punctuated with "dark, inhuman screams".

== Alternate versions ==
The Alan Vega 70th Birthday Limited Edition EP Series featured two versions of "Frankie Teardrop". The first was a cover by American poet and singer Lydia Lunch, and the other was a previously unreleased 1976 demo of the song titled "Frankie Teardrop vs the Space Alien". A previously unreleased 14-minute version of the song also appears on the band's 2022 compilation album Surrender.

== Critical reception ==
The track received critical attention due to both its disturbing nature (Nick Hornby in his book 31 Songs described it as something you would listen to "Only once"), and for its political viewpoint, which Allmusic described as "more literally and poetically political than the work of bands who wore their radical philosophies on their sleeve". Bruce Springsteen cited the song as an influence on his own song "State Trooper" from the album Nebraska; Springsteen's song features a similar desperate narrator on the verge of violence and a monotonous two-chord musical structure, along with high-pitched vocal shrieks. Pitchfork cited it as "[The track that] gets most of the ink" in terms of critical acclaim, and jokingly as "Taxi Driver: The Musical" when citing its parent album in its 100 Greatest '70s Albums list.

Lou Reed once said that he wished that he had written the song.

== In popular culture ==
The frightening nature of the song gave birth to a recurring segment on comedian Tom Scharpling's long-running weekly call-in radio program The Best Show, which is named "The Frankie Teardrop Challenge". Beginning in around 2013, Scharpling challenged fans of the show to listen to the song on headphones as loudly as possible, at nighttime and while alone, in the most creatively terrifying situations that they can think of. Callers regularly phone in to recount their experiences attempting the challenge, with very few listeners completing all 10 minutes and 26 seconds of the song. Scharpling also often works elements of "Frankie Teardrop" into experimental improvisational sound collages that he regularly creates on-air.

More recently, the song was referenced in Wilco frontman Jeff Tweedy's book World Within a Song. Additionally, the song appears in the 2025 biographical drama Springsteen: Deliver Me from Nowhere.

== Personnel ==
Adapted from the Suicide liner notes.

Suicide

- Martin Rev – keyboards
- Alan Vega – vocals

Production and additional personnel

- Larry Alexander – engineering
- Craig Leon – production
- Marty Thau – production
