= Cheree =

Single by Suicide

from the album Suicide
- B-side: "I Remember"
- Released: 1978
- Studio: Ultima Sound, New York City
- Genre: Electronica; synth-pop
- Length: 3:45
- Label: Bronze
- Songwriters: Martin Rev; Alan Vega
- Producers: Craig Leon; Marty Thau

Suicide track listing
- 7 tracks: 1. "Ghost Rider"; 2. "Rocket U.S.A.; 3. "Cheree"; 4. "Johnny"; 5. "Girl"; 6. "Frankie Teardrop"; 7. "Ché"

"Cheree" is a song by the synth punk band Suicide, written by its members Martin Rev and Alan Vega. It was released as a single in 1978 by Bronze Records. Since its initial release, it has been covered by a number of artists, most notably by ? and the Mysterians on their 1999 album More Action.

== Accolades ==
Year	Publication	Country	Accolade	Rank
1992	NME	United Kingdom	100 Best Indie Singles Ever	*
2001	Mojo	United Kingdom	100 Punk Scorchers	56
2003	Q	United Kingdom	The 1001 Best Songs Ever: Top 10 Electronica	2
2006	Blow Up	Italy	100 Songs to Remember	36

(*) designates unordered lists.

== Formats and track listing ==
All songs written by Martin Rev and Alan Vega.

UK 7" single (BRO 57)

1. "Cheree" – 3:45
2. "I Remember" – 3:15

== Personnel ==
Adapted from the Cheree liner notes.

Suicide

- Martin Rev – keyboards
- Alan Vega – vocals

Production and additional personnel

- Craig Leon – production
- Marty Thau – production

== Release history ==
Region	Date	Label	Format	Catalog
United Kingdom	1978	Bronze	LP	BRO 57
Italy	1978	Bronze	LP	RED 1, HKAS 32204
United Kingdom	1986	Demon	LP	D 1046

== Use in TV commercial ==
In 2020, the song was used in a commercial for the Daisy brand of perfume by Marc Jacobs.
