= Jared Artaud =

American guitarist and vocalist

- Born: New York City, US
- Genres: Electro-psych, punk, electronic, experimental, minimalism, psych, rock n roll, synthpop, psych rock, post-punk, neo-psychedelic
- Occupations: Musician, Producer, Guitarist
- Instruments: Vocals, Guitars, Gretsch Country Gentleman, Vox Phantom XII, Silvertone 1484 amp, Airline Twin Tone
- Years active: 2010–present day
- Labels: Mexican Summer, Sonic Cathedral, Fuzz Club, Reverberation Appreciation Society, A Recordings, Sacred Bones, Mute Records
- Spinoffs: The Vacant Lots
- Website: http://www.thevacantlots.com

Jared Artaud is an American musician and producer. He is primarily known for his work with the post-punk duo The Vacant Lots.

== Biography ==
Artaud is the co-founder, guitarist, vocalist and songwriter of minimalist post-punk band The Vacant Lots. In 2014, The Vacant Lots released their debut album Departure and Artaud released his first book of poetry entitled Empty Space. He also co-produced and designed the artwork for The Vacant Lots debut album Departure.

In 2017, he co-produced The Vacant Lots Endless Night album on Metropolis, which featured vocals by Alan Vega. In July, 2017 Artaud co-produced Alan Vega's final posthumously released album It . In 2018, Artaud released his second book of poetry, Tomorrow. In 2020, Artaud co-produced The Vacant Lots third album, Interzone.

In 2021, Artaud co-produced, mixed, and did art direction on the lost Alan Vega album Mutator. In 2022, The Vacant Lots released their fourth album, Closure on Fuzz Club. The album single "Consolation Prize" first aired on Iggy Pop's BBC6 radio show.

Artaud is credited for art direction and design on Suicide's only official compilation album Surrender. Continuing Artaud's work on both Alan Vega and Suicide's archives, he discovered the unreleased recordings for Suicide's third album A Way of Life 35 year anniversary. While working on Alan Vega's Vega Vault archives, Artaud discovered Suicide's live cover of Bruce Springsteen’s “Born in the U.S.A.”.

On February 10, 2023 Jared Artaud and fashion designer Hedi Slimane co-produced an extended mix of Suicide's "Girl" for Celine's FW23 runway show at Le Palace in Paris.

On October 13, 2023 The Vacant Lots released their fifth studio album, Interiors. The album's singles "Amnesia" and "Damaged Goods" premiered on Hero Magazine and Iggy Pop's Iggy Confidential BBC6 radio show.

In 2024, a posthumous Alan Vega album called Insurrection was released. It included 11 previously unreleased recordings and was produced and mixed by Jared Artaud and Liz Lamere in New York City. Artaud is also credited for art direction on this album as well as the music video for "Mercy" which was directed by Douglas Hart. In May, 2024 a new exhibition of Alan Vega's art, Cesspool Saints, was co-curated by Artaud at the Laurent Godin Gallery in Paris.

== Discography ==
For recordings made with The Vacant Lots, please see The Vacant Lots discography.

== Books ==
- Heartworm Press, Heartworm Reader Vol. 1 (2020)
- Tomorrow (2018)
- Empty Space (2014)

== Art direction ==
- Alan Vega "Mercy" music video directed by Douglas Hart (2024)
- Alan Vega Insurrection LP (2024)
- The Vacant Lots Interiors LP (2023)
- The Vacant Lots Closure LP (2022)
- Alan Vega "Jukebox Babe" 7" Reissue (2022)
- Suicide Surrender LP (2022)
- Suicide "Frankie Teardrop" music video directed by Douglas Hart (2022)
- Alan Vega "Muscles" music video directed by Douglas Hart (2021)
- Alan Vega Cheap Soul Crash poetry book (2021)
- The Vacant Lots Interzone LP (2020)
- The Vacant Lots Damage Control LP (2020)
- The Vacant Lots Exit EP (2019)
- Jared Artaud Tomorrow poetry book (2018)
- Alan Vega Deuce Avenue LP Reissue (2018)
- Alan Vega New Raceion LP Reissue (2018)
- Alan Vega Power On To Zero Hour LP Reissue (2018)
- Alan Vega Dujang Prang LP Reissue (2018)
- Alan Vega Station LP Reissue (2018)
- Alan Vega 2007 LP Reissue (2018)
- The Vacant Lots Endless Night LP (2017)
- Alan Vega It LP (2017)
- The Vacant Lots Berlin EP (2016)
- The Vacant Lots Departure LP (2014)
- Jared Artaud Empty Space poetry book (2014)
- The Vacant Lots "High and Low" 7" (2012)
- The Vacant Lots "Confusion" 7” (2011)
