= The Vacant Lots =

- Jared Artaud and Brian MacFadyen, 2014

Background information
- Origin: Burlington, Vermont, U.S.
- Genres: Electro, psychedelic rock, garage rock, neo-psychedelia, minimal, shoegazing
- Years active: 2010–present
- Labels: Sonic Cathedral, Mexican Summer, The Reverberation Appreciation Society, Fuzz Club, Metropolis Records, A Recordings.
- Members: Jared Artaud; Brian MacFadyen
- Website: thevacantlots.com

The Vacant Lots are an American post-punk band based in Brooklyn, New York.

== History ==
The Vacant Lots are a two-piece post-punk band formed by Jared Artaud and Brian MacFadyen in Burlington, Vermont in 2010. The group is currently based in Brooklyn, New York. Their sound has been described as minimalist, rock and roll, psych and punk. The band's "minimal means maximum effect" aesthetic is something they have developed since the band's formation by continuing as a two-piece. The group has cited Native American drumming, early rock n roll, The Velvet Underground, Iggy Pop, The Gun Club, and Television as major influences.

In 2010, they were invited by Sonic Boom to tour the US for the first time with his band Spectrum. In 2011, The Vacant Lots signed to Mexican Summer and released their first official single "Confusion" b/w "Cadillac." Later that year, The Black Angels and The Reverberation Appreciation Society invited them to perform at Austin Psych Fest 4. In the summer of 2011, The Vacant Lots supported Dean Wareham at The Bell House in New York City. In 2012, they were invited back to play Austin Psych Fest 5 and the band signed to The Reverberation Appreciation Society for their second official 7" single release, "High And Low" b/w "Let Me Out."

In January 2013 The Vacant Lots toured the U.S. with The Growlers. In February, their third single "6 AM" was released on Sonic Cathedral Records (UK) as part of a 6 band contemporary psych-rock compilation called Psych For Sore Eyes. In October 2013, The Vacant Lots' cover version of "No More Christmas Blues" by Alan Vega was released as part of a compilation album called Psych-Out Christmas.

The Vacant Lots also announced that they had completed their debut album. In April 2014, they supported Dean Wareham on a tour of the U.S.

On July 1, 2014, The Vacant Lots released their debut album Departure on UK independent record label Sonic Cathedral on July 1, 2014. It was produced by The Vacant Lots, mixed and mastered by Sonic Boom, engineered by Ted Young, and featured Dean Wareham on guitar on the track "Tomorrow". BrooklynVegan premiered the first single and music video for "Mad Mary Jones" from the debut album. On May 21, 2014, The Vacant Lots and Alan Vega released a split 10" vinyl on Fuzz Club Records. The release debuts a new track by Alan Vega entitled "Nike Soldier" and an alternate mix of "Mad Mary Jones" by The Vacant Lots. The same week, Interview Magazine premiered the music video for "Before The Evening's Thru", which is the second released track from the band's debut album 'Departure'.

In June and July 2014 The Vacant Lots toured the UK for the first time with The Brian Jonestown massacre. On July 1, The Vacant Lots released their debut album 'Departure' on London independent label Sonic Cathedral. In September, Spanish independent label Ayo Silver! released a limited edition 10" vinyl entitled 'Arrival' compiling the band's singles and remixes. 'Arrival' was also included as a bonus disc in the first copies of the group's debut album and features artwork by LA Pop-Surrealist artist Anthony Ausgang. Additionally, in September the band toured Europe and the UK as well as a performance at Liverpool Psych Fest. On September 22, Sonic Cathedral released the duo's third single "Paint This City" backed with "Departure." The Quietus premiered the music video for the single, which was directed by Boston filmmaker Samuel Quinn.

The Vacant Lots supported Suicide at Webster Hall in New York City on March 7, 2015. This was the second to last show Alan Vega played before he died on July 16, 2016. On March 16, 2015, Sonic Cathedral released a vinyl only single by The Vacant Lots which featured two remixes by Alan Vega and Anton Newcombe. The Vacant Lots performed at independent UK music festival Secret Garden Party with Temples and Toy on July 25, 2015.

During their 2015 European tour, The Vacant Lots recorded a collaborative EP entitled Berlin with Anton Newcombe in Berlin, Germany which was and released on A Recordings on November 25, 2016.

The band's second full-length album, 'Endless Night', was released worldwide on Metropolis Records on April 21, 2017. The last track on the album "Suicide Note" featured vocals by Alan Vega. It is one of the last collaborations that Alan Vega was part of before he died. The Vacant Lots supported the Black Rebel Motorcycle Club in Europe in 2017.

In May, 2019 The Vacant Lots were invited by The Dandy Warhols to tour the US on their 25th anniversary tour.

On August 30, 2019, the group released Exit EP on Anton Newcombe's A Recordings record label. This was their second EP recorded with Anton Newcombe, who mixed and produced the album in Berlin. "Bells" the single off the record charted at number 9 on the Official UK Vinyl Singles Chart Top 40.

On Friday, April 24, 2020, The Vacant Lots announced their third album Interzone would be released on June 26 on London indie record label Fuzz Club. The album was described as "a genre-blending synthesis of dance and psych" The album sleeve and packaging features the consistent visual identity associated with the band; black and white Op artwork by Swiss designer, Ivan Liechti and art direction by Jared Artaud. On April 24, "Rescue", the first single off the new album was released and described by BrooklynVegan as "post-punk inspired...which brings to mind Jesus And Mary Chain and Love & Rockets." "Fracture", the second single off the group's third album Interzone was released on May 22, and premiered on Post-Punk Magazine, which they described as "explosive psych mixed with the experimental spirit of proto-punk; a fuzzy memory trying desperately to resurface." On Friday, June 26, 2020, The Vacant Lots third album Interzone was released on Fuzz Club.

On October 16, 2020, Fuzz Club released "Departure" Remix by Robert Levon Been of Black Rebel Motorcycle Club. On October 30, A Recordings released Damage Control, a double album featuring both Berlin and Exit EPs which was recorded and produced by Anton Newcombe . In 2021, Jared Artaud co-produced, mixed, and did art direction on the lost Alan Vega album Mutator, released on Sacred Bones Records, and was interviewed in The New York Times for his work producing and curating Alan Vega and Suicide's archives.

The Vacant Lots released their fourth album, Closure, on September 30, 2022, on Fuzz Club. The single "Thank You" off the album premiered on Flood Magazine on August 8, 2022. The Vacant Lots released their third single "Consolation Prize" on September 7, 2022, from their upcoming album "Closure". The song and music video premiered on Under The Radar Magazine. The tracks "Consolation Prize" and "Thank You" first aired on Iggy Pop's BBC Radio 6 Music show with some brand new Vacant Lots". On September 30, The Vacant Lots supported The Black Angels in North America culminating in a performance at Levitation (festival) for the after party for The Jesus and Mary Chain.

On October 13, 2023 The Vacant Lots released their fifth studio album, Interiors on Fuzz Club.The album's singles "Amnesia" and "Damaged Goods" premiered on Hero Magazine and Iggy Pop's BBC6 radio show.

== Band members ==
=== Members ===
- Jared Artaud — Vocals, Guitars, Bass, Synths, Producer, Mixing, Songwriter, Artwork.
- Brian MacFadyen — Electronics, Drums, Vocals, Bass, Synths, Producer, Mixing, Songwriter.

== Discography ==
=== Albums ===
- Interiors (Oct 2023) (Fuzz Club)
- Closure (Sept 2022) (Fuzz Club)
- Interzone (June 2020) (Fuzz Club)
- Endless Night (April 2017) (Metropolis)
- Departure (July 2014) (Sonic Cathedral)

=== EPs ===
- Exit (EP 12") (August 2019) (A Recordings)
- Berlin (EP 12") (November 2016) (A Recordings)
- Alan Vega/The Vacant Lots (EP split 10") (May 2014) (Fuzz Club)

=== Singles ===
- "Amnesia" (Digital) (July 2023) (Fuzz Club)
- "Damaged Goods" (Digital) (Aug 2023) (Fuzz Club)
- "Consolation Prize" (Digital) (Sept 2022) (Fuzz Club)
- "Thank You" (Digital) (Aug 2022) (Fuzz Club)
- "Chase" (Digital) (Aug 2022) (Fuzz Club)
- "Departure" (Robert Levon Been Remix) (7", Digital) (October 2020) (Fuzz Club)
- "Exit" (Digital) (June 2020) (Fuzz Club)
- "Fracture" (Digital) (May 2020) (Fuzz Club)
- "Rescue" (Digital) (April 2020) (Fuzz Club)
- "Bells" (Digital) (May 2019) (A Recordings)
- "Departure" / "Let Me Out" (Sonic Boom Mix) (7") (April 2015) (Bronson Recordings)
- "6 AM" (Alan Vega Remix) / "Never Satisfied" (Anton Newcombe Remix) (7") (March 2015) (Sonic Cathedral)
- "Paint This City" / "Departure" (Digital) (September 2014) (Sonic Cathedral)
- "Before The Evening's Thru" (Digital) (July 2014) (Sonic Cathedral)
- "Mad Mary Jones" (Digital) (June 2014) (Sonic Cathedral)
- "High and Low" / "Let Me Out" (7") (August 2012) (The Reverberation Appreciation Society)
- "Confusion" / "Cadillac" (7") (January 2011) (Mexican Summer)

=== Compilations ===
- Damage Control (LP) (October 2020) (A Recordings)
- "6 AM" (LP) Liverpool International Festival Of Psychedelia Presents PZYK Vol. 1 (October 2020) (PZYK Records)
- "Fame" (LP) A Salute to the Thin White Duke – The Songs of David Bowie (October 2016) (Cleopatra Records)
- "Julia" (LP) The Magical Mystery Psych-Out: A Tribute To The Beatles (March 2015) (Cleopatra Records)
- "She Smiled Sweetly" (LP) Stoned: A Psych Tribute to The Rolling Stones (January 2015) (Cleopatra Records)
- "No More Christmas Blues" (LP) Psych-Out Christmas (October 2013) (Cleopatra Records)
- "6 AM" (EP) Psych For Sore Eyes (February 2013) (Sonic Cathedral)

== Logo ==
Logo

Like most of the band's album artwork and concert posters and black and white are used. The logo was designed by The Vacant Lots.
