= Liz Lamere =

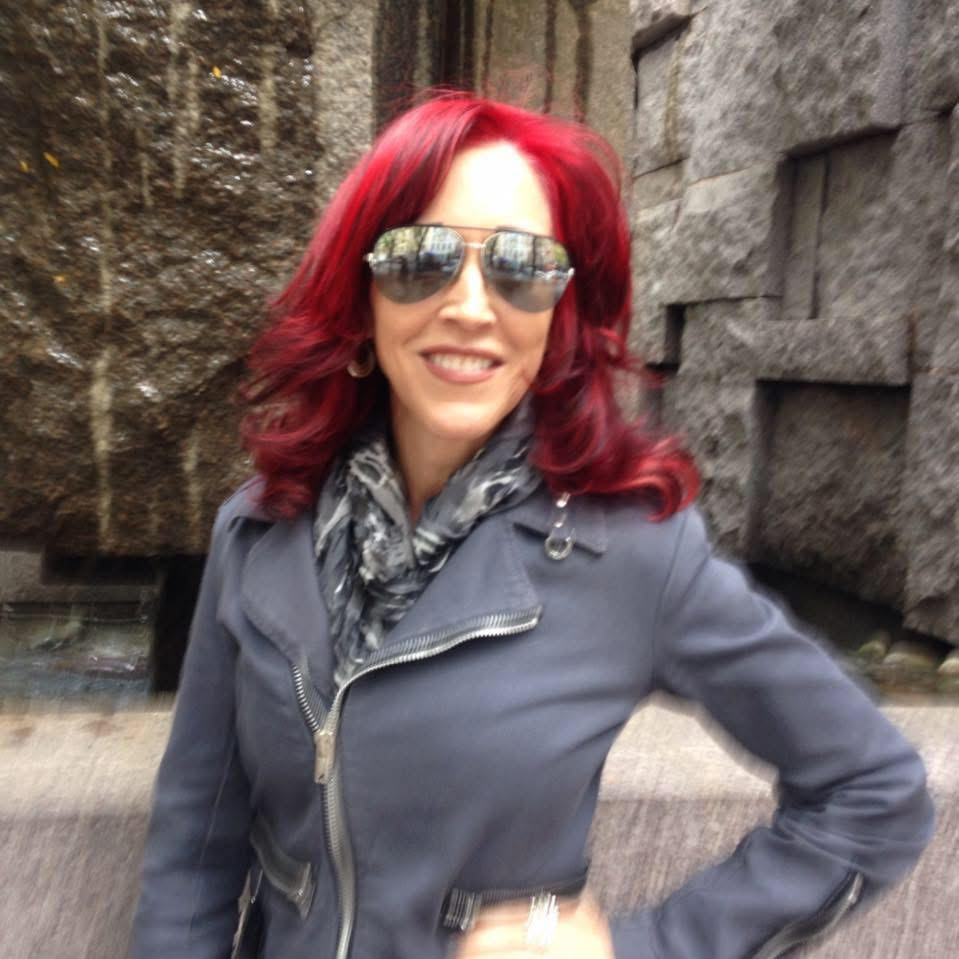
- Liz Lamere, 2016

Background information
- Born: Milton, MA.
- Genres: electronic, synthpop, punk, experimental
- Instruments: Vocals, Synths, Electronics
- Years active: 1988-present
- Label: In The Red
- Spouse: Alan Vega (m. 1992)

Liz Lamere is an American musician, producer, and author based in New York City. Best known for her decades-long collaboration with her husband Alan Vega of Suicide, she established a solo career after his death with two full-length albums on In the Red Records and co-authored a biography, Infinite Dreams: The Life of Alan Vega.

== Biography ==
=== Early life and collaboration with Alan Vega ===
Liz Lamere graduated from Columbia Law School in 1983 and has been living and working in New York City ever since. While practicing corporate law on Wall Street for six years, Lamere was also playing drums in punk bands on the Lower East Side.

In 1985 she met her future life partner and creative collaborator Alan Vega of the punk band Suicide at The Limelight in New York City. The couple remained together for more than three decades until Vega's death in 2016.

In 1988, Lamere founded Saturn Strip, Ltd to represent all of Alan Vega's music and art rights, as well as her own music publishing. She co-wrote, co-produced, and performed on Vega's solo records, and toured internationally with him for over three decades. In addition to her work in electronics, synths, and drum machines, Lamere also managed Vega's music and art career. Lamere and Vega married in 1992 and had a son, Dante, in 1998.

After Vega's death in 2016, Lamere has led the Vega Vault with Jared Artaud. It comprises many decades worth of unreleased recordings, albums, demos, and visual art by Alan Vega. Lamere and Jared Artaud co-produced Vega's three posthumously released albums IT (2017, Fader), Mutator (2021, Sacred Bones), and Insurrection (2024, In The Red). Lamere had both writing and production credit on IT, and a review in The Quietus magazine highlighted her "judicious deployment of noise, rhythm, New York field recordings, and distortion" to make the album one of Vega's "finest" works.

=== Solo career and publications ===
On May 20, 2022, Lamere released her debut solo album, entitled Keep It Alive, on In The Red. Writing for the BrooklynVegan, Bill Pearis called the album "dark, throbbing and very hooky electro". In December, Lamere appeared on The Lydian Spin podcast hosted by Lydia Lunch and Tim Dahl, where she discussed her solo work, creative process, and background in boxing.

In 2024 Lamere co-authored a biography of Alan Vega with Laura Davis-Chanin, titled Infinite Dreams: The Life of Alan Vega, with a foreword by Bruce Springsteen. A 2024 review in North Coast Voice praised Infinite Dreams, stating that "Liz Lamere doesn’t go out of her way to shatter this shared primal visage of her late husband… but she does a commendable job of adding depth and scale to his work." Similarly, it received a positive review in the Library Journal, as an "intimate glimpse into Vega's life, work, and influence as an artist and performer".

Lamere released her second solo album One Never Knows on July 14, 2024. The album received a positive 4* review in the Record Collector magazine, with critic Kris Needs stating Lamere's "multi-tiered vocal harmonies and instrumental counter melodies brandish a defiant confidence Vega would be proud of". In addition to touring nationally and internationally with Lydia Lunch, Marc Hurtado, and Mercury Rev, Lamere's single "King City Ghost" from One Never Knows, along with other tracks such as "Lights Out" from Keep It Alive, were played on Henry Rollins' KCRW radio show.

=== Festival appearances ===
Lamere performed live at the All Tomorrow's Parties festival curated by Dirty Three in Minehead, UK in 2007, and in February 2025 she appeared as a solo artist at the Noise Pop Festival in San Francisco.

== Discography ==
=== Solo albums ===
- Keep It Alive (2022)
- One Never Knows (2024)

=== Albums recorded and performed with Alan Vega ===
- Deuce Avenue (1990)
- Power on to Zero Hour (1991)
- New Raceion (1993)
- Dujang Prang (1995)
- 2007 (1999)
- Station (2007)
- It (2017)
- Mutator (2021)
- Insurrection (2024)

== Bibliography ==
- Lamere, Liz; Davis-Chanin, Laura (2024). Infinite Dreams: The Life of Alan Vega. Rowman & Littlefield. ISBN 9781493072484.
