= Suicide (1977 album) =

Studio album by Suicide
- Released: December 28, 1977
- Studio: Ultima Sound (Blauvelt, NY)
- Genres: Synth-punk; punk rock; electronic rock; synth-pop; minimalist
- Length: 32:07
- Label: Red Star
- Producers: Craig Leon; Marty Thau

Suicide chronology
Suicide (1977)	21½ Minutes in Berlin/23 Minutes in Brussels (1978)

Singles from Suicide
- 1. "Johnny" Released: 1977; 2. "Cheree" Released: May 1978

Suicide is the debut studio album from the American rock band Suicide. It was released in 1977 on Red Star Records and produced by Craig Leon and Marty Thau. The album was recorded in four days at Ultima Sound Studios in New York and featured Martin Rev's minimalist electronics and harsh, repetitive rhythms paired with Alan Vega's rock and roll-inspired vocals and depictions of urban life.

Upon its initial release, Suicide was greeted with some favorable reception from the UK press, but was universally panned in the United States, where it failed to chart. However, the album would soon be regarded as a milestone in electronic and rock music. In 2013, Pitchfork named Suicide one of the greatest albums of the 1970s, while in 2012 and 2020, Rolling Stone ranked it as one of the 500 greatest albums of all time. The album also influenced artists in various genres, including Bruce Springsteen, the Fleshtones, Spacemen 3, and Peaches.

== Production ==
Suicide was the first group to sign to Marty Thau's Red Star record label. Thau had previously worked at Paramount Records and Buddah Records and had sold his assets to Richard Gottehrer to create Red Star Records. After hearing a demo tape from Suicide, he asked if he could see Suicide perform live, which led to the group being signed to Red Star. Red Star hired Craig Leon to co-produce the record.

Suicide entered the studio with much of their songs already written and rehearsed from having spent the previous five years playing shows. The recording of the album was done in four days. Leon had previously worked with reggae musicians Bob Marley and Lee "Scratch" Perry and seen them create dub-like effects with their music and used an Eventide digital delay unit to create these echo effects on the album's vocal tracks. Leon returned to California after four days of work which led to Marty Thau to work on the rest of the production. Alan Vega changed the lyrics of "Frankie Teardrop" during the mixing sessions of the album. Thau remixed the tracks "Ghost Rider", "Rocket U.S.A." and "Cheree". Leon returned to New York where the two remixed "Frankie Teardrop". The album was mastered at Frankford/Wayne in New York.

== Style ==
Musically, Suicide has been described as synth-punk, electronic rock, and synth-pop, while also being labeled electronic and minimalist. All the songs on the album have a "stripped down" sound with Martin Rev providing a backing combining "harshly hypnotic organs" and "dense, unnerving electronics". The vocals on the album provided by Alan Vega have been described as similar to Gene Vincent. In 2012, Vega stated that "originally I was a rock'n'roll kid; I was born into the rock'n'roll era of 45s in the late fifties" and that "Elvis Presley to me is like God, and Roy Orbison and Jerry Lee Lewis, they're my triumvirate." "Johnny" was described by the online music database AllMusic as a showcase for the band's "affinity for '50s melodies and images, as well as their pop leanings."

Martin Rev described the songs "Frankie Teardrop", "Johnny" and "Cheree" as being about street people. "Frankie Teardrop" was influenced by a story Alan Vega read in a newspaper about a factory worker who lost his job and resorted to murdering his wife and child before committing suicide. The lyrics of the song were improvised by Vega, who attempted to get into the mindset of both the factory worker and his family. "Cheree" was about a girlfriend of Martin Rev.

== Release ==
Suicide was first released in December 1977. Howard Thompson of Bronze Records in the United Kingdom received a copy of the album from the United States. After listening to it he went to New York to see the group perform live and negotiate a deal to license their music for Bronze. The album failed to chart in both the United States and the United Kingdom. A single for the song "Cheree" was released in May 1978 on both 7-inch and 12-inch vinyl formats. The single featured a remixed version of "Cheree" with the B-side "I Remember". John Lydon reviewed the single for the NME, referring to it as "'Je t'aime' with tape hiss".

The album was re-issued by Red Star Records in 1980. The album has been re-released on other labels including Mute Records in 1998 and Blast First Records on compact disc and digital download formats with varying bonus tracks.

== Reception ==
Professional ratings
Review scores
Source	Rating
AllMusic	4.5/5 stars
Christgau's Record Guide	C+
The Line of Best Fit	9/10
The List	4/5 stars
Pitchfork	9.1/10
Q	4/5 stars
The Rolling Stone Album Guide	3/5 stars
Select	4/5
Spin	10/10
Spin Alternative Record Guide	9/10

Music journalist Tony Fletcher stated that the album "struggled for immediate attention" due to it being an independent release. The album received positive contemporary reviews from the NME, Time Out and Melody Maker in the United Kingdom. Writing in Sounds, Jon Savage was more circumspect, saying "Granted that the monotony is intentional, much of the cut is chilling – the screams and drift of the instrument into landscapes of blankness – and reaches the sought level of terror. Yeah, and then the mood is broken by dumb lyrics".

Reception to the album in the United States was strongly negative. Music critic Robert Christgau gave the album a C+ rating, stating "there are little problems like lyrics that reduce serious politics to rhetoric, singing that makes rhetoric sound lurid, and the way the manic eccentricity of this duo's live performance turns to silliness on record" Rolling Stone also gave Suicide a negative review, referring to the album as "absolutely puerile" and Alan Vega's vocals as "nothing but arrogance and wholesale insensibility".

Rolling Stone placed Suicide at number 441 on its 2012 list of the 500 greatest albums of all time, and at number 498 on an update of the list in 2020. The magazine also ranked the album 66th on the list of the 100 Greatest Punk Albums of All Time. Online music magazine Pitchfork placed the album at number 39 on its list of best albums of the 1970s. The album is listed in the reference book 1001 Albums You Must Hear Before You Die. In her review of Suicide for AllMusic, critic Heather Phares wrote, "Proof that punk was more about attitude than a raw, guitar-driven sound, Suicide's self-titled debut set the duo apart from the rest of the style's self-proclaimed outsiders." Spin's Joe Gross described the album as "beyond classic" and found that "no one has ever come close to replicating its monolithic vibe."

== In popular culture ==
The album was influential in the development of many musical genres, including post-punk, synth-pop and industrial rock. Tony Fletcher wrote in All Hopped Up and Ready to Go: Music from the Streets of New York 1927–77 that it would "in its own way", become as influential as other acclaimed punk albums such as Horses, Ramones and Marquee Moon. In 2017, Henry Rollins, singer of Black Flag and Rollins Band, described "Frankie Teardrop" as "the single most intense song I've ever heard in my life".

Songs from the album have been featured in various forms of media since the album's initial release. Director Rainer Werner Fassbinder contacted Red Star to get the rights for "Frankie Teardrop" for his film In a Year of 13 Moons. The song is featured during a party scene. "Cheree" was used by director Edo Bertoglio for his film Downtown 81, a film shot in the early 1980s but not completed until 1999. In 2024, "Rocket U.S.A." was used in the movie Civil War, while "Ghost Rider" was featured in the movie The Apprentice.

Several music artists and groups have covered songs from Suicide. Fellow New Yorkers the Fleshtones recorded a cover of "Rocket U.S.A." for their debut album Blast Off!. The album was produced by Marty Thau and when Alan Vega visited him when he was recording the album at Blank Studios, he was invited to sing while the group performed the song. Question Mark and the Mysterians recorded a cover of "Cheree" in 1996. English rapper M.I.A.'s song "Born Free" was based on a sample of "Ghost Rider". Bruce Springsteen stated that his song "State Trooper" from the album Nebraska was heavily influenced by "Frankie Teardrop". The album is shown in the 2025 film Springsteen: Deliver Me from Nowhere, where Bruce Springsteen is shown listening to the record in his bedroom studio, and "Frankie Teardrop" is heard playing in another scene where Bruce nearly wrecks his Dodge Challenger. He frequently covered "Dream Baby Dream" live. In 2008, a series of EPs were released in tribute to Suicide by various recording artists to celebrate Alan Vega's 70th birthday. Songs from the album that were part of the series included "Johnny" covered by Peaches, "Frankie Teardrop" covered by Lydia Lunch, "Che" by Sunn O))), Spacemen 3 and Pan Sonic, and "Rocket U.S.A." covered by Nik Void.

== Track listing ==
All tracks are written by Alan Vega & Martin Rev.

Side A
No.	Title	Length
1.	"Ghost Rider"	2:34
2.	"Rocket U.S.A."	4:16
3.	"Cheree"	3:42
4.	"Johnny"	2:11
5.	"Girl"	4:05

Side B
No.	Title	Length
6.	"Frankie Teardrop"	10:26
7.	"Che"	4:53
Total length:		31:51

Reissue bonus tracks
No.	Title	Length
8.	"Cheree (Remix)"	3:46
9.	"I Remember"	3:11
10.	"Keep Your Dreams"	4:50

Bonus disc
No.	Title	Length
1.	"Mr Ray (Live at CBGB's)"	6:29
2.	"Las Vegas Man (Live at CBGB's)"	4:23
3.	"96 Tears (Live at CBGB's)"	3:48
4.	"Keep Your Dreams (Live at CBGB's)"	3:19
5.	"I Remember (Live at CBGB's)"	5:11
6.	"Harlem (Live at CBGB's)"	4:05
7.	"23 Minutes Over Brussels"	22:56

== Personnel ==
Credits adapted from liner notes.

- Suicide – arrangement
- Timothy Jackson – artwork
- Larry Alexander – engineering
- Mitchell Ames – assistant audio engineer
- Martin Rev – keyboards
- Craig Leon – production
- Marty Thau – production
- Alan Vega – vocals

== See also ==
- 1977 in music
- Music of New York City
