= Alan Vega (album) =

Studio album by Alan Vega
- Released: 1980
- Studios: Skyline Studios, New York City
- Genres: Rockabilly, post-punk
- Length: 35:04
- Label: PVC
- Producer: Alan Vega

Alan Vega chronology
Alan Vega (1980)	Collision Drive (1981)

Professional ratings
Review scores
Source	Rating
Allmusic	3/5 stars

Alan Vega is the first studio album of Alan Vega, released in 1980 by PVC Records.

== Accolades ==
Publication	Country	Accolade	Year	Rank
NME	United Kingdom	Albums of the Year	1981	35

== Track listing ==
All tracks are written by Alan Vega.

Side one
No.	Title	Length
1.	"Jukebox Babe"	4:48
2.	"Kung Foo Cowboy"	3:54
3.	"Fireball"	3:26
4.	"Love Cry"	4:43

Side two
No.	Title	Length
1.	"Speedway"	2:33
2.	"Ice Drummer"	4:22
3.	"Bye Bye Bayou"	8:36
4.	"Lonely"	2:42

== Personnel ==
Adapted from the Alan Vega liner notes.

Musicians

- Phil Hawk – guitar
- Alan Vega – vocals, production

Production and additional personnel

- Curtis Knapp – cover art
- David Lichtenstein – engineering

== Release history ==
Region	Date	Label	Format	Catalog
United States	1980	PVC, ZE	LP	PVC 7915
Canada	1981	Quality Records Limited	LP	ZEA 33–600
France	1981	Celluloid	LP	CEL-529 568
Germany	1981	Celluloid	LP	203 741-320
Germany	1987	Interphon	CD	IPCD 2013–36
United Kingdom	2017	Futurismo	LP	Futurismo No. 26
