= Jukebox Babe =

Single by Alan Vega

from the album Alan Vega
- B-side: "Lonely"
- Released: 1981
- Recorded: Skyline Studios, NYC
- Genre: Rockabilly, post-punk
- Length: 2:55
- Label: Celluloid
- Songwriter: Alan Vega
- Producer: Alan Vega

"Jukebox Babe" is a song by Alan Vega, released as a single in 1981 by Celluloid Records.

== Accolades ==
Year	Publication	Country	Accolade	Rank
1988	Rolling Stone	France	The 100 Best Singles of the Last 25 Years	34

== Formats and track listing ==
All songs written by Alan Vega

US 7" single (WIP 6744)

1. "Jukebox Babe" – 2:55
2. "Lonely" – 2:45

== Personnel ==
Adapted from the Jukebox Babe liner notes.

Musicians

- Phil Hawk – guitar
- Alan Vega – vocals, production

Production and additional personnel

- Curtis Knapp – cover art
- David Lichtenstein – engineering

== Charts ==
Chart (1981)	Peak position
U.S. Billboard Dance Music/Club Play Singles	49

== Release history ==
Region	Date	Label	Format	Catalog
United States	1981	Celluloid	LP	WIP 6744
