= Collision Drive =

Studio album by Alan Vega
- Released: 1981
- Studio: Skyline Studios, New York City
- Genre: Rockabilly, art pop
- Length: 40:02
- Label: Celluloid
- Producer: Alan Vega

Alan Vega chronology
Alan Vega (1980)	Collision Drive (1981)	Saturn Strip (1983)

Professional ratings
Review scores
Source	Rating
Allmusic	4/5 stars

Collision Drive is the second studio album by Alan Vega, released in 1981 by Celluloid Records.

== Track listing ==
All tracks are written by Alan Vega, except "Be Bop a Lula" by Gene Vincent, Donald Graves and Bill Davis and "Ghost Rider" co-written with Martin Rev.

Side one
No.	Title	Length
1.	"Magdalena 82"	3:10
2.	"Be Bop a Lula" (Gene Vincent and His Blue Caps cover)	2:19
3.	"Outlaw"	3:31
4.	"Raver"	2:44
5.	"Ghost Rider" (Suicide cover)	4:28
6.	"I Believe"	5:25

Side two
No.	Title	Length
1.	"Magdalena 83"	2:55
2.	"Rebel"	2:48
3.	"Viet Vet"	12:42

== Personnel ==
Adapted from the Collision Drive liner notes.

Musicians

- Larry Chaplan – bass guitar
- Sesu Coleman – drums
- Mark Kuch – guitar
- Alan Vega – vocals, production

Production and additional personnel

- Donald Greenhaus – cover art
- David Lichtenstein – engineering
- Kenneth Torregrossa – assistant engineer

== Release history ==
Region	Date	Label	Format	Catalog
United States	1981	Celluloid	LP	CEL-5001
United Kingdom	1981	Celluloid	LP	ILPS 9692
France	1981	Celluloid, Vogue	CS, LP	729813
Germany	1981	Celluloid	LP	204 294–320
Germany	1987	Interphon	CD	IPCD 2014–36

== Charts ==
Chart performance for Collision Drive
Chart (2026)	Peak position
French Physical Albums (SNEP)	171
French Rock & Metal Albums (SNEP)	55
