= Saturn Strip =

Studio album by Alan Vega
- Released: April 9, 1983
- Recorded: November–December 1982
- Studio: Syncro Sound, Boston
- Genre: Synth-pop
- Length: 38:07
- Label: Elektra
- Producer: Ric Ocasek

Alan Vega chronology
Collision Drive (1981)	Saturn Strip (1983)	Just a Million Dreams (1985)

Saturn Strip is an album by Alan Vega, released in 1983 on Elektra Records. The album was produced by Ric Ocasek and features musical contributions from Al Jourgensen.

== Background and production ==
Before the recording began, Vega signed to his first major label Elektra Records that would release Saturn Strip.

"Kid Congo" is a homage to Kid Congo Powers, evolving from a soundcheck abstraction called "Bongo Bongo". "Every 1's a Winner" is a cover of the Hot Chocolate song.

It was produced by Ric Ocasek, known for his work with Suicide and The Cars. The song "Saturn Drive" features a then-unknown synth-pop musician Alain Jourgensen who provided synthesizer sounds.

== Composition ==
Saturn Strip is characterized as a synth-pop album.

The songs' composition have been described by Victor W. Valdivia (AllMusic) as concise, around four-minutes long, structurally straightforward, and polished production-wise. Comparing Saturn Strip to Alan Vega's previous work, Valdivia called it less self-indulgent and musically robust, which allows "Vega's talent for evocative lyrics and clever melodies comes across clearly".

Billboard highlighted the differences in mood between Saturn Strip and Vega's earlier work. He "largely dropped the morbidity [....] letting cheerful, Cars-style synth burbles lead the way".

== Release ==
The album wasn't commercially successful upon its release.

The album was reissued on CD in 2004 by Wounded Bird, which also included the Just a Million Dreams album.

== Critical reception and legacy ==
Professional ratings
Review scores
Source	Rating
AllMusic	4.5/5 stars

Victor W. Valdivia, in his review for AllMusic, empathized the albums style, which significantly differ from art punk of his previous records, leaning closer than ever to the mainstream sound. Valdivia deemed it the best album of his career, "one that even occasionally tops his Suicide oeuvre".

MGMT made a cover of “Goodbye Darling”, as a tribute to Alan Vega.

== Track listing ==
All tracks composed by Alan Vega; except where indicated

1. "Saturn Drive" (Al Jourgensen, Alan Vega) - 5:36
2. "Video Babe" - 3:17
3. "American Dreamer" (Ric Ocasek, Vega) - 5:04
4. "Kid Congo" - 2:37
5. "Goodbye Darling" (Mark Kuch, Vega) - 2:38
6. "Wipeout Beat" - 5:59
7. "Je T'Adore" - 3:40
8. "Angel" - 5:06
9. "Every 1's a Winner" (Errol Brown) - 4:10

== Personnel ==
- Alan Vega - vocals
- Mark Kuch - guitar
- Larry Chaplin - bass
- Sesu Coleman - drums
- Stephen George - drums on "Saturn Drive", "American Dreamer" and "Wipeout Beat"
- Ric Ocasek - guitar, keyboards
- Al Jourgensen - keyboards on "Saturn Drive"
- Greg Hawkes - synthesizer, saxophone on "Wipeout Beat"

Technical

- Michael Zilkha - executive producer
