= Mutator (album) =

Studio album by Alan Vega
- Released: April 23, 2021
- Length: 31:42
- Label: Sacred Bones

Alan Vega chronology
IT (2017)	Mutator (2021)	Insurrection (2024)

Professional ratings
Aggregate scores
Source	Rating
Metacritic	76/100
Review scores
Source	Rating
NME	3/5 stars
Line of Best Fit	8/10 stars
Music OMH	5/5 stars
Allmusic	3.5/5 stars

Mutator is a studio album by American musician Alan Vega, released in April 2021 under the Sacred Bones label. Originally recorded by Vega, along with Liz Lamere, between 1995 and 1996, the album became "lost". Subsequently, Lamere and Jared Artaud rediscovered the album posthumous to Vega's death, as part of the "Vega Vault", and released it in 2021. A review in the New Musical Express called the album "a lesson in uncompromising art from an old master".

== Track listing ==
No.	Title	Length
1.	"Trinity"	1:16
2.	"Fist"	5:12
3.	"Muscles"	4:45
4.	"Samurai"	3:44
5.	"Filthy"	3:30
6.	"Nike Soldier"	4:17
7.	"Psalm 68"	4:36
8.	"Breathe"	4:22
