= It (Alan Vega album) =

Studio album by Alan Vega
- Released: July 14, 2017
- Length: 52:19
- Label: Fader

Alan Vega chronology
| Station (2007) | It (2017) | Mutator (2021) |

Professional ratings
Aggregate scores
| Source | Rating |
|---|---|
| Metacritic | 84/100 |
Review scores
| Source | Rating |
| Tiny Mix Tapes | 4.5/5 marks |
| Rolling Stone | 4/5 stars |

It is the eleventh studio album by American musician Alan Vega. It was released in July 2017 under the Fader Label. The album was recorded between 2010 and 2016 with Alan Vega's wife Liz Lamere, before his death in July 2016.

== Track listing ==
| No. | Title | Length |
|---|---|---|
| 1. | "DTM" | 6:40 |
| 2. | "Dukes God Bar" | 6:28 |
| 3. | "Vision" | 6:11 |
| 4. | "IT" | 5:01 |
| 5. | "Screamin Jesus" | 4:44 |
| 6. | "Motorcycle Explodes" | 4:32 |
| 7. | "Prayer" | 6:18 |
| 8. | "Prophecy" | 7:27 |
| 9. | "Stars" | 4:58 |
