= Hero (British magazine) =

British magazine

Hero is a magazine that was founded in 2009.

== Overview ==
The magazine focuses on men's fashion and lifestyle, including interviews with public figures. The editors of the periodical are Fabien Kruszelnicki and James West. The publication is run out of London, England. The New York Times has described the periodical as, "romanticiz[ing] macho ideals about skateboard culture and biker gangs." Interviews are often done between the featured public figure, such as James Franco or Ansel Elgort, and West. Each issue also consists of articles and photographic essays. Many of the photos are taken by Kruszelnicki. Other photographers have included Hedi Slimane.

== Other periodicals ==
The publication also produces a female-oriented variation of the magazine called Heroine.
