= Marty Thau =

Marty Thau (December 7, 1938 – February 13, 2014) was an American rock 'n' roll entrepreneur and music producer. He was best known as the founder of indie punk—new wave label Red Star Records in 1977, and for being the manager of the New York Dolls and co-producer of Suicide's classic self-titled debut album.

== Early life ==
Thau was raised in New York City and attended New York University, 1956–1960, studying communications.

== Career ==
Thau was hired into the advertising department at Billboard Magazine in 1963. He spent the latter half of the 1960s as a record industry executive at Cameo-Parkway, from which he resigned in August 1967, and Buddah Records. He then joined an independent production/publishing/management company, Inherit Productions, as one of three partners. During the few years which Thau spent with Inherit, the company released two classic albums by Van Morrison, Astral Weeks and Moondance, Vintage Violence by ex-Velvet Underground member John Cale, the debut album by rock power-trio Glass Harp, an album by Cass Elliot—when she switched over to RCA Records from ABC Records—and a project by bittersweet story-teller, Biff Rose. All of the above-mentioned albums were produced for Inherit by Lewis Merenstein, one of Thau's partners.

Thau left Inherit in 1972 to become head of A&R for Paramount Records but resigned six months later to become the manager of the rock 'n' roll group, the New York Dolls. The Dolls were known for their urban street attitude and gender parodying irreverence, and recorded songs drawn from early 1960s girl groups, southern soul, and 1950s rock 'n' roll.

After the Dolls disbanded in 1975, Thau entered New York's underground demimonde and was integral to the scene's development as a spawning ground of punk-new wave stars. He is acknowledged as such in the Encyclopedia of Record Producers, a Billboard Magazine reference book that lists the 500 most important record producers in music history and behind the scenes heroes of popular music.

In addition to the Dolls, he worked with prominent punk and new wave artists such as The Ramones, Blondie, Brian Setzer, Richard Hell & The Voidoids, The Real Kids, The Fleshtones, Martin Rev and Walter Steding for his Red Star label.

In 1980, he released a new wave compilation album through Red Star called Marty Thau Presents 2x5, which featured 2 songs each from New York City bands The Fleshtones, The Revelons, Bloodless Pharaohs (featuring Brian Setzer), Comateens, and Student Teachers.

Marty Thau died on February 13, 2014, due to complications from renal failure, aged 75, in Petersburg, Virginia.

Before his death, Thau reported that he was working on a memoir titled Rockin' The Bowery (From the New York Dolls to Suicide), previewed in Rocker Magazine in the fall of 2011. A second excerpt, about his experiences with Suicide during their first European tour, was published in Sensitive Skin magazine in December, 2012.
