= Red Star Records =

American independent record label

Red Star Records was an independent, U.S. record label founded by former New York Dolls manager, A&R/record producer Marty Thau in 1977, who signed some of the most influential, American punk rock and new wave bands during the 1970s such as Suicide, The Real Kids, and The Fleshtones.

Thau revived Red Star in about 2010, and the label released material by the band Lola Dutronic.

== See also ==
- List of record labels
