= Alan Vega =

American singer (1938–2016)

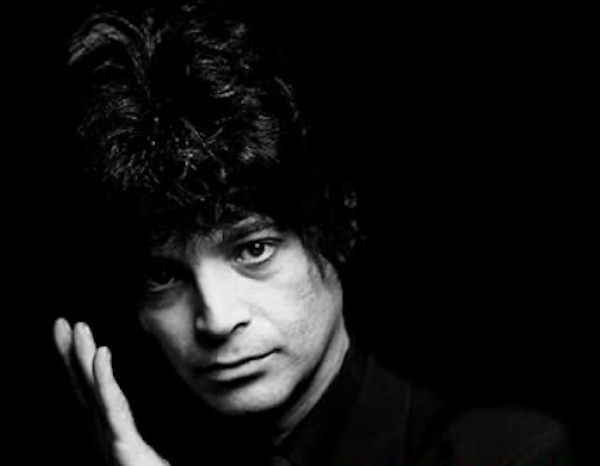
- Alan Vega, 1980

Background information
- Born: Alan Bermowitz; June 23, 1938; New York City, New York, U.S.
- Died: July 16, 2016 (aged 78) New York City, New York, U.S.
- Genres: Electronic; proto-punk; experimental; synth-punk; minimal; industrial; rockabilly; synth-pop
- Occupations: Singer; sculptor; painter
- Years active: 1966–2016
- Labels: Sacred Bones; Mute; Elektra
- Spouse(s): Mariette Mindele-Birencwajg (m. 1960; div. 1969) Liz Lamere (m. 1992)

Alan Bermowitz (June 23, 1938 – July 16, 2016), known professionally as Alan Vega, was an American singer and visual artist, primarily known for his work with the electronic and proto-punk duo Suicide.

== Life and career ==
Alan Bermowitz was raised in Bensonhurst, Brooklyn. Until the announcement of the 70th birthday release of his recordings in 2008, Vega was widely thought to have been ten years younger; the 2005 book Suicide: No Compromise lists 1948 as his birth year and quotes a 1998 interview in which Vega talks about watching Elvis Presley on The Ed Sullivan Show (1956) as a "little kid". A 1983 Los Angeles Times article refers to him as a 35-year-old, and several other sources also list 1948 as his birthdate. Two 2009 articles confirmed his 1948 birth date, one in Le Monde about the Lyon exhibit and one in the magazine Rolling Stone.

In the mid-1950s, Bermowitz attended Brooklyn College where he studied both physics and fine art under Ad Reinhardt and Kurt Seligmann and graduated in 1960.

In the 1960s, he became involved with the Art Workers' Coalition, a radical artists group that harassed museums and once barricaded the Museum of Modern Art. In 1970, he reportedly first met and befriended Martin "Rev" Reverby.

In 1969, funding from the New York State Council on the Arts made possible the founding of MUSEUM: A Project of Living Artists—an artist-run 24-hour multimedia gallery at 729 Broadway in Manhattan. Producing visual art under the name Alan Suicide, Bermowitz graduated from painting to light sculptures, (Note: "I started as a painter. The first time I did a light piece was when I was working on a very big purple painting. There was one light bulb in the room and as I walked around I noticed how the painting acquired different aspects. I wanted it to be one color so I said, "Fuck this, man!" I took the light out of the ceiling and really stuck it on the painting." Alan Vega, 1993 – 100,000 Watts of Fat City Anna Polerica.) many of which were constructed of electronic debris. He gained a residency at the OK Harris Gallery in SoHo where he continued to exhibit until 1975. Barbara Gladstone continued to show his work well into the 1980s.

Seeing The Stooges perform at the New York State Pavilion in August 1969 was an epiphany for Bermowitz. (Note: "It showed me you didn't have to do static artworks, you could create situations, do something environmental. That's what got me moving more intensely in the direction of doing music. Compared with Iggy, whatever I was doing as an artist felt insignificant." Reynolds, Village Voice.January 29, 2002) With Rev, Bermowitz began experimenting with electronic music, and formed a band that would become Suicide, along with guitarist Paul Liebgott. The group played twice at MUSEUM before moving on to the OK Harris Gallery. Writing publicity flyers under the pseudonym Nasty Cut, Bermowitz used the terms "Punk Music" and "Punk Music Mass" to describe their music, which he adopted from an article by Lester Bangs. In 1971, the group dropped Paul Liebgott; for a time it included Rev's wife, Mari Reverby, on drums (although she didn't play at their live performances).

With Bermowitz finally settling on Alan Vega as a stage name, they began to play music venues. Suicide went on to perform at the Mercer Arts Center, Max's Kansas City and CBGB, and ultimately to achieve international recognition.

In 1980, Vega released an eponymous first solo record. It defined the frantic rockabilly style that he would use in his solo work for the next several years, with the song "Jukebox Babe" becoming a hit single in France. In 1985, he released the more commercially viable Just a Million Dreams but was dropped from his record label after its release. The album originally was set to be produced by Ric Ocasek as a follow-up to the critically acclaimed Saturn Strip (1983), but production switched over to Chris Lord-Alge and Vega ran into several difficulties during the recording sessions. The album eschewed many of Vega's experimental traits in favor of power pop songs and he later lamented, "They took all my songs and turned them into God knows what."

Vega teamed up with Martin Rev and Ric Ocasek again in the late eighties to produce and release the third Suicide album, A Way of Life (1988). Visual artist Stefan Roloff produced a music video for the song Dominic Christ, which was released by Wax Trax! Records. Suicide went overseas to promote the album by performing the song "Surrender" in Paris, which was aired on French television. Shortly thereafter, Vega met future wife and music partner Elizabeth Lamere while piecing together sound experiments that would evolve into his fifth solo album, Deuce Avenue (1990). Deuce Avenue marked his return to minimalist electronic music, similar to his work with Suicide, in which he combined drum machines and effects with free-form prose. Over the next several decades he would release six more solo records and perform and release albums with Suicide.

In 2002, art dealer Jeffrey Deitch tracked down Vega after a couple of his young gallery employees "gushed" over a Suicide gig at the NYC Knitting Factory. As a result, Vega made a return to visual art, constructing Collision Drive, an exhibition of sculptures combining light with found objects and crucifixes.

Vega's tenth solo album, Station, was released on Blast First Records in 2007 and was described by his colleagues as "his hardest, heaviest album for quite a while." In 2008, British label Blast First Petite released a limited edition Suicide 6-CD box set and monthly tribute series of 10" Vinyl EP's, to mark the occasion of Alan Vega's 70th birthday Musicians who contributed to the tribute series included The Horrors, Lydia Lunch, Primal Scream, and Miss Kittin.

In 2009, the Museum of Contemporary Art in Lyon, France, mounted Infinite Mercy – a major retrospective exhibit of Vega's art, curated by Mathieu Copeland. This included the screening of two short documentary films: Alan Vega (2000) by Christian Eudeline, and Autour d’Alan Vega (extraits) (1998) by Hugues Peyret.

In 2012, Vega suffered a stroke. That, and problems with his knees, led him to focus on less physically demanding art, such as painting; however, he continued to perform at selected concerts and work on the music that led to his final studio album, It. He continued to live in downtown New York City.

In 2016, Vega contributed vocals to the song "Tangerine" on French pop veteran singer Christophe's album Les Vestiges du Chaos.

In 2017, Alan Vega's final album It was released posthumously on July 14 on Fader. The album was produced by Alan Vega, Liz Lamere, Perkin Barnes. The album cover and inner sleeves featured Vega's original artwork. Two posthumous art shows "Dream Baby Dream" at Deitch Gallery and "Keep IT Alive" at Invisible-Exports exhibited Alan Vega's work in New York City.

In 2021, Sacred Bones Records released Mutator, the lost Alan Vega album in a series of unreleased and rare material from the Vega Vault.

In 2024, a posthumous album titled Insurrection, consisting of 11 previously unreleased recordings by Vega, was released on In The Red Records.

== Death ==
Vega died in his sleep on July 16, 2016, at the age of 78. His death was announced by musician and radio host Henry Rollins, who shared an official statement from Vega's family on his website.

== Discography ==
=== Studio albums ===
- Alan Vega (1980)
- Collision Drive (1981)
- Saturn Strip (1983)
- Just a Million Dreams (1985)
- Deuce Avenue (1990)
- Power on to Zero Hour (1991)
- New Raceion (1993)
- Dujang Prang (1995)
- 2007 (1999)
- Station (2007)
- It (2017) recordings from 2010-2016
- Mutator (2021) recordings from 1995-1996
- Insurrection (2024) recordings from 1997-1998.

=== Collaboration albums ===
- Dead Man (1994) with Mercury Rev
- Cubist Blues (1996) with Alex Chilton and Ben Vaughn
- Getchertikitz (1996) with Ric Ocasek and Gillian McCain
- Endless (1998) with Pan Sonic as Vainio Väisänen Vega
- Righteous Lite™ (1998) with Stephen Lironi as Revolutionary Corps of Teenage Jesus
- Re-Up (1999) with Étant Donnés, Lydia Lunch and Genesis P-Orridge
- Resurrection River (2004) with Pan Sonic as VVV
- Sniper (2010) with Marc Hurtado (Étant Donnés)
- After Dark (2021) with Ben Vaughn, Barb Dwyer & Palmyra Delran

=== Soundtracks ===
- Sombre (1999) Original score of the film by Philippe Grandrieux

=== Compilations ===
- 2006 – Silver Monk Time – A Tribute to the Monks (29 bands cover The Monks) label play loud! productions
- 2006 – The Wiretapper 16 free CD issued to subscribers of The Wire and available on some over the counter issues, but not all.
- 2008 – Alan Vega 70th Birthday Limited Edition EP Series (covers of Vega's work by Bruce Springsteen, Primal Scream, Peaches, Grinderman, Spiritualized, The Horrors, Sunn O)))+Pansonic, Julian Cope, Lydia Lunch, Vincent Gallo, LIARS and Klaxons.

== Bibliography ==
- Vega, Alan (1994). Cripple Nation. 2.13.61. ISBN 978-1880985168.
- Vega, Alan (2000). 100,000 Watts of Fat City. OCLC 469640909.
- Vega, Alan (2010). Copeland, Mathieu (ed.). Alan Suicide Vega – Infinite Mercy? Let U$ Pray!. Dijon, France: Les presses du reel.
- Vega, Alan (2017). eBook (ed.). Alan Vega – Conversation with an Indian. LE TEXTE VIVANT. ISBN 9782367230443.

== Biography ==
- Davis-Chanin, Laura and Lamere, Liz with Foreword by Bruce Springsteen, Infinite Dreams: The Life of Alan Vega (June 18, 2024).
