= List of grunge albums =

This article is a list of grunge albums and EPs with articles on English Wikipedia. They appear on at least one cited album list and are described as "grunge" by AllMusic (). Although citations could be found describing each of these as "grunge", in some cases the designation would be controversial, particularly for those bands that are considered Post-grunge.

In addition, several artists not typically associated with grunge music have released albums displaying a grunge sound, including Manic Street Preachers with Gold Against the Soul (1993), R.E.M. with Monster (1994), and Def Leppard with Slang (1996).

== List of albums ==
Artist/Band	Title	Label	Notes
1985
Green River	Come On Down	Homestead	Debut release
Various artists	Deep Six	C/Z Records	Compilation album
1986
Melvins	Melvins	C/Z Records	Debut release
Screaming Trees	Other Worlds	Velvetone	Debut release
Screaming Trees	Clairvoyance	Velvetone	
1987
Skin Yard	Skin Yard	C/Z Records	Debut release
Screaming Trees	Even If and Especially When	SST	
Green River	Dry As a Bone	Sub Pop	
Melvins	Gluey Porch Treatments	Alchemy	
Soundgarden	Screaming Life	Sub Pop	Debut release
1988
Green River	Rehab Doll	Sub Pop	Final studio album
Screaming Trees	Invisible Lantern	SST	
Soundgarden	Fopp	Sub Pop	
Skin Yard	Hallowed Ground	Toxic Shock	
Mudhoney	Superfuzz Bigmuff	Sub Pop	
Soundgarden	Ultramega OK	SST	
Various artists	Sub Pop 200	Sub Pop	Compilation album
Blood Circus	Primal Rock Therapy	Sub Pop	
1989
Tad	God's Balls	Sub Pop	
Mother Love Bone	Shine	Mercury	Debut release
Screaming Trees	Buzz Factory	SST	
Nirvana	Bleach	Sub Pop	
Soundgarden	Louder Than Love	A&M	
Mudhoney	Mudhoney	Sub Pop	
Various Artists	Another Pyrrhic Victory	C/Z Records	Compilation album
Melvins	Ozma	Boner	
1990
Alice in Chains	We Die Young	Columbia	Debut release
Alice in Chains	Facelift	Columbia	Mainstream hit
Babes in Toyland	Spanking Machine	Twin/Tone	Debut release
Green River	Dry As a Bone/Rehab Doll	Sub Pop	Compilation album
Gruntruck	Inside Yours	eMpTy	Debut release
L7	Smell the Magic	Sub Pop	
Mother Love Bone	Apple	Mercury	Final studio album
Mudhoney	Superfuzz Bigmuff Plus Early Singles	Sub Pop	Compilation album
Screaming Trees	Change Has Come	Sub Pop	
Screaming Trees	Something About Today	Epic	
Skin Yard	Fist Sized Chunks	Cruz	
Soundgarden	Screaming Life/Fopp	Sub Pop	Compilation album
Tad	Salt Lick/God's Balls	Sub Pop	Compilation album
Solomon Grundy	Solomon Grundy	New Alliance Records	Debut release
Various artists	Fuck Me I'm Rich	Waterfront Records	Compilation album
1991
Babes in Toyland	To Mother	Twin/Tone	
Skin Yard	1000 Smiling Knuckles	Cruz	
Hammerbox	Hammerbox	C/Z Records	Debut release
Hole	Pretty on the Inside	Caroline	Debut release
Melvins	Bullhead	Boner	
Melvins	Eggnog	Boner	
Mudhoney	Every Good Boy Deserves Fudge	Sub Pop	
Nirvana	Nevermind	DGC	Mainstream hit
Pearl Jam	Ten	Epic	Debut release; mainstream hit
Screaming Trees	Uncle Anesthesia	Epic	
Screaming Trees	Anthology: SST Years 1985–1989	SST	Compilation album
Soundgarden	Badmotorfinger	A&M	Mainstream hit
Tad	8-Way Santa	Sub Pop	
Temple of the Dog	Temple of the Dog	A&M	Sole release
Various Artists	The Grunge Years	Sub Pop	Compilation album
Earth	Extra-Capsular Extraction	Sub Pop	Debut release
1992
7 Year Bitch	Sick 'Em	C/Z Records	Debut release
Alice in Chains	Sap	Columbia	
Alice in Chains	Dirt	Columbia	Mainstream hit
Babes in Toyland	Fontanelle	Reprise	
Gruntruck	Push	Roadrunner	
L7	Bricks Are Heavy	Slash	Mainstream hit
Late!	Pocketwatch	Simple Machines	Sole release
Love Battery	Between the Eyes	Sub Pop	Debut release
Love Battery	Dayglo	Sub Pop	
Melvins	King Buzzo	Boner	
Melvins	Dale Crover	Boner	
Melvins	Joe Preston	Boner	
Melvins	Lysol	Boner	
Mother Love Bone	Mother Love Bone	Mercury	Compilation album
Mudhoney	Piece of Cake	Reprise	
Nirvana	Incesticide	DGC	Compilation album; mainstream hit
Screaming Trees	Sweet Oblivion	Epic	
Stone Temple Pilots	Core	Atlantic	Debut release; mainstream hit
Willard	Steel Mill	Roadracer Records/Roadrunner Records	
Various artists	Singles: Original Motion Picture Soundtrack	Epic	Soundtrack album
1993
Earth	Earth 2	Sub Pop	
Hammerbox	Numb	A&M	Final studio album
Hater	Hater	A&M	Debut release
Manic Street Preachers	Gold Against the Soul	Columbia	
Melvins	Houdini	Atlantic	
Mudhoney	Five Dollar Bob's Mock Cooter Stew	Reprise	
Nirvana	In Utero	DGC	Final studio album; mainstream hit
Pearl Jam	Vs.	Epic	Mainstream hit
Radiohead	Pablo Honey	EMI	Debut studio album
Skin Yard	Inside the Eye	Cruz	
Tad	Inhaler	Warner Bros.	
1994
7 Year Bitch	¡Viva Zapata!	C/Z Records	
Alice in Chains	Jar of Flies	Columbia	Mainstream hit
Bush	Sixteen Stone	Trauma Records	Debut release; mainstream hit
Hole	Live Through This	DGC	Mainstream hit
L7	Hungry for Stink	Slash	
Melvins	Stoner Witch	Atlantic	
Moist	Silver	EMI	Debut release; mainstream hit
Mötley Crüe	Mötley Crüe	Elektra	John Corabi as lead singer
Nirvana	MTV Unplugged in New York	DGC	Live album; mainstream hit
Pearl Jam	Vitalogy	Epic	Mainstream hit
R.E.M.	Monster	Warner Bros.	Mainstream hit
Soundgarden	Superunknown	A&M	Mainstream hit
Stone Temple Pilots	Purple	Atlantic	Mainstream hit
Tad	Live Alien Broadcasts	Futurist	Live album
1995
Earth	Phase 3: Thrones and Dominions	Sub Pop	
Alice in Chains	Alice in Chains	Columbia	Mainstream hit
Ammonia	Mint 400	Murmur	Debut release
Babes in Toyland	Nemesisters	Reprise	Final studio album
Foo Fighters	Foo Fighters	Capitol/Roswell Records	Debut release; mainstream hit
Hole	Ask for It	Caroline	
Mad Season	Above	Columbia	Sole release
Malfunkshun	Return to Olympus	Loosegroove	Sole release
Mudhoney	My Brother the Cow	Reprise	
Pearl Jam	Merkin Ball	Epic	
The Presidents of the United States of America	The Presidents of the United States of America	PopLlama	Debut release; mainstream hit
Silverchair	Frogstomp	Murmur/Epic	Debut release; mainstream hit
Tad	Infrared Riding Hood	East West/Elektra	Final studio album
Truly	Fast Stories... from Kid Coma	Capitol	
Soundgarden	Songs from the Superunknown	A&M	
1996
Earth	Pentastar: In the Style of Demons	Sub Pop	
7 Year Bitch	Gato Negro	Atlantic	Final studio album
Alice in Chains	Unplugged	Columbia	Live album
Bush	Razorblade Suitcase	Trauma/Interscope	
Melvins	Stag	Atlantic	
Moist	Creature	EMI	Mainstream hit
Def Leppard	Slang	Mercury	Gold in UK and US
Nirvana	From the Muddy Banks of the Wishkah	DGC	Live album
Pearl Jam	No Code	Epic	
The Presidents of the United States of America	II	Columbia	Mainstream hit
Screaming Trees	Dust	Epic	
Soundgarden	Down on the Upside	A&M	
Stone Temple Pilots	Tiny Music... Songs from the Vatican Gift Shop	Atlantic	
Various artists	Hype!	Sub Pop	Soundtrack album
1997
Bush	Deconstructed	Trauma/Interscope	Remix album; mainstream hit
Hole	The First Session	Sympathy for the Record Industry	
Hole	My Body, the Hand Grenade	City Slang	Compilation album
Kiss	Carnival of Souls: The Final Sessions	Mercury	
L7	The Beauty Process: Triple Platinum	Slash	
Melvins	Honky	Amphetamine Reptile Records	
The Presidents of the United States of America	Rarities	Sony Music Japan	Compilation album
Silverchair	Freak Show	Murmur	Mainstream hit
Soundgarden	A-Sides	A&M	Compilation album
Truly	Feeling You Up	Capitol	
1998
Ammonia	Eleventh Avenue	Murmur	Final studio album
Hole	Celebrity Skin	Geffen	Mainstream hit
Jerry Cantrell	Boggy Depot	Columbia	Debut release
L7	Live: Omaha to Osaka	Man's Ruin	Live album
Mudhoney	Tomorrow Hit Today	Reprise	
Pearl Jam	Yield	Epic	
Pearl Jam	Live on Two Legs	Epic	Live album
The Presidents of the United States of America	Pure Frosting	Columbia	Compilation album
1999
Alice in Chains	Nothing Safe: Best of the Box	Columbia	Compilation album
Alice in Chains	Music Bank	Columbia	Box set
Bush	The Science of Things	Trauma/Interscope	Mainstream hit
L7	Slap-Happy	Bong Load Custom	Final studio album
Love Battery	Confusion Au Go Go	C/Z Records	Final studio album
Melvins	The Maggot	Ipecac	
Melvins	The Bootlicker	Ipecac	
Stone Temple Pilots	No. 4	Atlantic	
2000
Alice in Chains	Live	Columbia	Live album
Babes in Toyland	Lived, Devil, Viled	Almafame	Compilation album
L7	The Slash Years	Slash	Compilation album
Melvins	The Crybaby	Ipecac	
Mudhoney	March to Fuzz	Sub Pop	Compilation album
Mudhoney	Here Comes Sickness: The Best of the BBC	Sub Pop	Compilation album
Pearl Jam	Binaural	Epic	
Truly	Twilight Curtains	Capitol	
2001
Alice in Chains	Greatest Hits	Columbia	Compilation album
Screaming Trees	Nearly Lost You	Epic	Compilation album
Stone Temple Pilots	Shangri-La Dee Da	Atlantic	
2002
Jerry Cantrell	Degradation Trip	Roadrunner	
Mudhoney	Since We've Become Translucent	Sub Pop	
Nirvana	Nirvana	DGC	Compilation album
Pearl Jam	Riot Act	Epic	
2003
Pearl Jam	Lost Dogs	Epic	Compilation album
Stone Temple Pilots	Thank You	Atlantic	Compilation album
2004
Moist	Machine Punch Through: The Singles Collection	EMI	Compilation album
Nirvana	With the Lights Out	DGC	Box set
Pearl Jam	Live at Benaroya Hall	BMG	Live album
Pearl Jam	Rearviewmirror (Greatest Hits 1991–2003)	Epic	Compilation album
2005
Earth	Hex; Or Printing in the Infernal Method	Southern Lord Records	
Bush	The Best of '94–'99	SPV GmbH	Compilation album
Bush	Zen X Four	Kirtland	Live album
Hammerbox	Live EMP Skychurch, Seattle, WA	Kufala	Live album
Nirvana	Sliver: The Best of the Box	DGC	Compilation album
Screaming Trees	Ocean of Confusion: Songs of Screaming Trees 1989–1996	Epic	Compilation album
2006
Alice in Chains	The Essential Alice in Chains	Columbia	Compilation album
Mudhoney	Under a Billion Suns	Sub Pop	
Pearl Jam	Pearl Jam	J	
2007
Pearl Jam	Live at the Gorge 05/06	Rhino/WEA	Box set
2008
Earth	The Bees Made Honey in the Lion's Skull	Southern Lord Records	
Mudhoney	The Lucky Ones	Sub Pop	
2009
Alice in Chains	Black Gives Way To Blue	EMI	
Nirvana	Live At Reading	Geffen	Live album
2010
Hole	Nobody's Daughter	Mercury	
Stone Temple Pilots	Stone Temple Pilots	Atlantic	
Soundgarden	Telephantasm	A&M Records	Compilation album
2011
Earth	Angels of Darkness, Demons of Light I	Southern Lord Records	
Soundgarden	Live on I-5	A&M Records	Live album
Screaming Trees	Last Words: The Final Recordings	Sunyata Productions	Post-breakup album
2012
Earth	Angels of Darkness, Demons of Light II	Southern Lord Records	
Soundgarden	King Animal	Seven Four Entertainment/Republic Records	Final studio album
2013
Alice in Chains	The Devil Put Dinosaurs Here	Capitol	
Pearl Jam	Lightning Bolt	Monkeywrench Records	
2014
Earth	Primitive and Deadly	Southern Lord Records	
The Presidents of the United States of America	Kudos to You!	PUSA Inc.	Final studio album
Soundgarden	Echo of Miles: Scattered Tracks Across the Path	A&M Records	Compilation album
2015
Kid Cudi	Speedin' Bullet 2 Heaven	Wicked Awesome/Republic	
2016
Green River	1984 Demos	Jackpot Records	
2018
Alice in Chains	Rainier Fog	BMG	
Mudhoney	Digital Garbage	Sub Pop	
2019
Green River	Live At The Tropicana Olympia WA September 28th 1984	Jackpot Records	Live album
Earth	Full upon Her Burning Lips	Sargent House	
2020
Bush	The Kingdom	BMG	
2021
10 Minute Warning	This Could be Heaven - The Lost 1984 Recordings	C/Z Records	
2023
Mudhoney	Plastic Eternity	Sub Pop	
