= Screaming Trees discography =

Discography of American rock band Screaming Trees

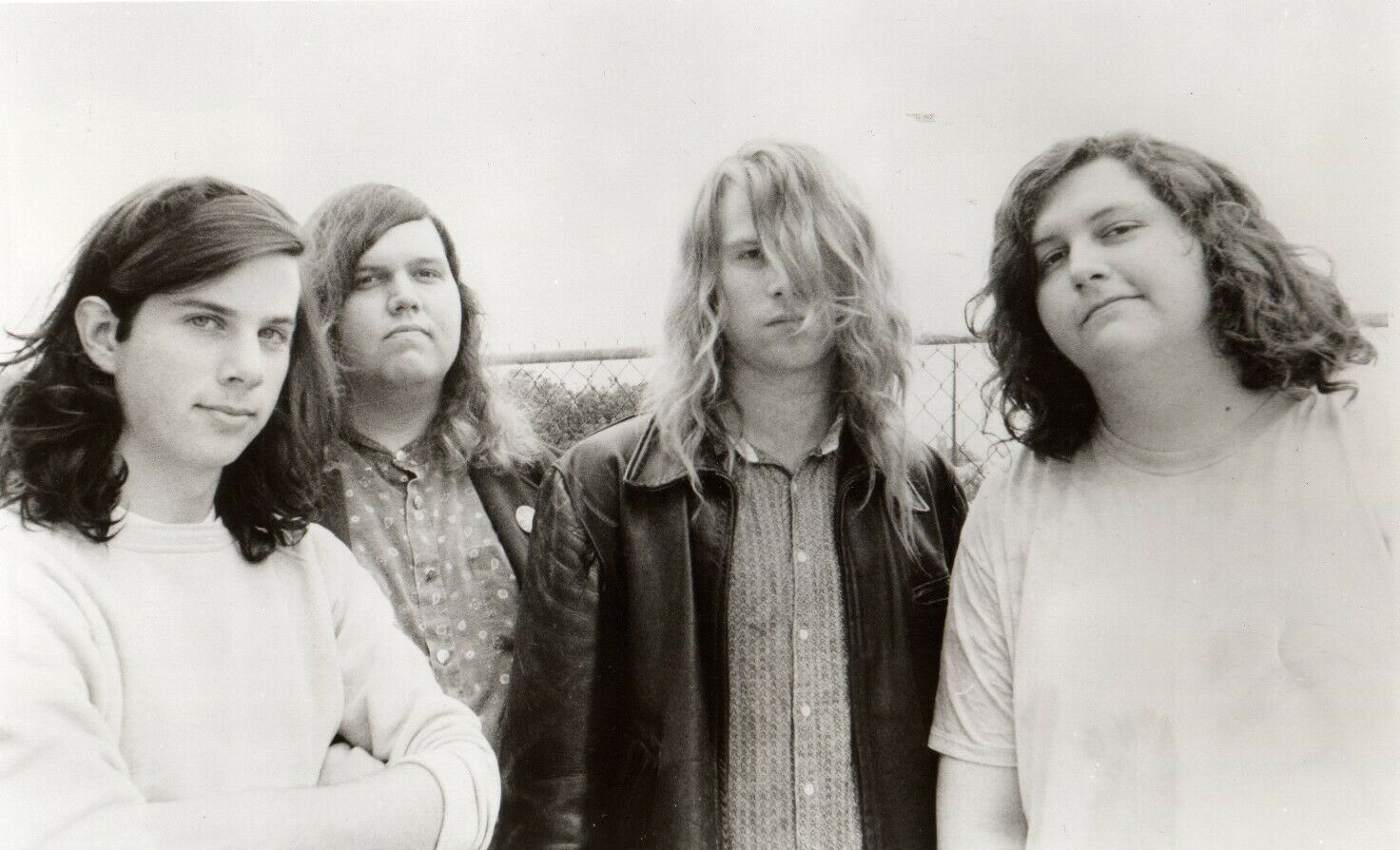
- 1980s promotional photo
- Studio albums: 8
- Extended plays: 5
- Compilation albums: 3
- Singles: 7
- Music videos: 7
- Other appearances: 10

The discography of Screaming Trees, an Ellensburg, Washington-based rock band, consists of eight studio albums, three compilation albums, five extended plays (EP), and six singles, though this does not include any solo material recorded by the individual members of Screaming Trees.

Vocalist Mark Lanegan, guitarist Gary Lee Conner, bassist Van Conner, and drummer (1985–1991) Mark Pickerel formed Screaming Trees in 1985, soon signing to the independent label Velvetone Records and releasing the Other Worlds EP. The Screaming Trees' debut album, Clairvoyance, came out in 1986. The same year Screaming Trees signed with punk label SST Records and released the second full-length album, Even If and Especially When. The band would later release two more albums under SST Records, then signed with Epic Records in 1990. In 1991, the Screaming Trees released its first album for a major label, Uncle Anesthesia.

Sweet Oblivion, released in 1992 and their first album with new drummer Barrett Martin, brought the band to a new level of commercial success, and the Screaming Trees found itself amidst the sudden popularity of the Seattle music scene. In 1996, the band released its seventh studio album, Dust; while successful, the album could not emulate the precedent set by Sweet Oblivion. Screaming Trees disbanded in 2000 due to conflicts among the members regarding the band's creative direction.

== Studio albums ==
Year	Title	Peak chart position				
Year	Title	US	US Heat.	AUS	CAN	UK
1986	Clairvoyance: Released: February 13, 1986; Label: Velvetone; Format: CD, CS, LP	—	—	—	—	—
1987	Even If and Especially When: Released: March 28, 1987; Label: SST; Format: CD, CS, LP	—	—	—	—	—
1988	Invisible Lantern: Released: May 12, 1988; Label: SST; Format: CD, CS, LP	—	—	—	—	—
1989	Buzz Factory: Released: April 19, 1989; Label: SST; Format: CD, CS, LP	—	—	—	—	—
1991	Uncle Anesthesia: Released: January 29, 1991; Label: Epic; Format: CD, CS, LP	—	—	—	—	—
1992	Sweet Oblivion: Released: September 8, 1992; Label: Epic; Format: CD, CS, LP	141	4	77	—	—
1996	Dust: Released: June 25, 1996; Label: Epic; Format: CD, CS, LP	134	5	75	39	32
2011	Last Words: The Final Recordings: Released: August 2, 2011; Label: Sunyata Music; Format: Mp3, CD, LP	—	—	—	—	—
"—" denotes releases that did not chart.

== Live albums ==
Year	Title
2023	Wrong Turn To Jahannam: Live From Egg Studio 1991: Released: November 24, 2023; Label: Screaming Trees Legacy; Format: LP
2025	Creeping Night (Live San Luis Obispo '86): Released: July 13, 2025; Label: Wolf Tree; Format: Mp3, Streaming

== Compilation albums ==
Year	Title	Peak chart position
Year	Title	UK
1991	Anthology: SST Years 1985-1989: Released: July 16, 1991; Label: SST; Format: CD, CS, LP	—
2001	Nearly Lost You: Released: July 1, 2001; Label: Sony; Format: CD, LP	—
2005	Ocean of Confusion: Songs of Screaming Trees 1990-1996: Released: May 24, 2005; Label: Epic; Format: CD, LP	152
"—" denotes releases that did not chart.

== Extended plays ==
Year	Title
1986	Other Worlds: Released: 1986; Label: Velvetone; Format: CS, CD, LP
1988	Beat Happening/Screaming Trees: Released: January 19, 1988; Label: K, Homestead; Format: CD, CS, LP
1990	Change Has Come: Released: 1990; Label: Sub Pop; Format: CD, CS, LP
1990	Something About Today: Released: June 8, 1990; Label: Epic; Format: CD, CS, LP
1992	Winter Songs Tour Tracks: Released: December 21, 1992; Label: Epic; Format: CD, CS, LP

== Singles ==
Year	Song	Peak chart positions					Album
Year	Song	US Alt	US Main.	AUS	CAN Alt.	UK	Album
1991	"Bed of Roses"	23	—	—	—	—	Uncle Anesthesia
1991	"Something About Today"	—	—	—	—	—	Uncle Anesthesia
1992	"Nearly Lost You"	5	12	96	—	50	Sweet Oblivion
1993	"Dollar Bill"	28	40	119	—	52	Sweet Oblivion
1993	"Shadow of the Season"	—	—	—	—	—	Sweet Oblivion
1993	"Butterfly"	—	—	—	—	—	Sweet Oblivion
1996	"All I Know"	9	9	—	7	—	Dust
1996	"Traveler"	—	—	—	—	—	Dust
1996	"Sworn and Broken"	—	—	—	—	76	Dust
"—" denotes releases that did not chart.

== Music videos ==
Year	Music video	Director
1991	"Bed of Roses"	
1992	"Nearly Lost You"	Eric Zimmerman
1993	"Dollar Bill"	Chris Cuffaro
1993	"Shadow of the Season"	Chris Cuffaro
1993	"Butterfly"	Mark Pellington
1996	"All I Know"	Mark Kohr
1996	"Sworn and Broken"	Dean Karr

== Other appearances ==
Year	Title	Song(s)	Ref.
1988	Sub Pop 200	"Love or Confusion"	
1991	The Grunge Years	"Change Has Come"	
1992	Singles: Original Motion Picture Soundtrack	"Nearly Lost You"	
1994	True Lies soundtrack	"Darkness, Darkness"	
1995	Working Class Hero: A Tribute to John Lennon	"Working Class Hero"	
2000	Double Shot: Alt Rock	"Nearly Lost You"	
