= Ocean of Confusion: Songs of Screaming Trees 1990–1996 =

Ocean of Confusion: Songs of Screaming Trees 1990-1996

Greatest hits album by Screaming Trees
- Released: May 24, 2005
- Genres: Grunge, neo-psychedelia
- Length: 77:47
- Label: Epic

Screaming Trees chronology
Nearly Lost You (2001)	Ocean of Confusion: Songs of Screaming Trees 1990-1996 (2005)	Last Words: The Final Recordings (2011)

Professional ratings
Review scores
Source	Rating
Allmusic	4/5 stars
Pitchfork Media	(3.5/10)
Rolling Stone	4/5 stars
Sputnikmusic	4/5 stars

Ocean of Confusion is the third 'best of' album by the Screaming Trees. The album chronicles their career from the time they signed to Epic Records until their final album, Dust. The band's years on SST Records are represented on a separate, earlier-released compilation, Anthology: SST Years 1985-1989. The tracks on Ocean of Confusion were personally chosen by the band's lead vocalist, Mark Lanegan, and all other aspects of the compilation were overseen by Lanegan, as well.

"Who Lies in Darkness" is taken from the Something About Today EP, along with three tracks from Uncle Anesthesia, seven from Sweet Oblivion, and five from Dust. "E.S.K.", a b-side to the "Nearly Lost You" single , is also collected, as well as two previously unheard songs from the aborted Don Fleming-produced follow up to Sweet Oblivion.

Notably, the album does not include "Bed of Roses" (Uncle Anesthesia) and "All I Know" (Dust), which were two of the band's four charting radio-play singles.

== Track listing ==
1. "Who Lies in Darkness" – 4:14
2. "Alice Said" – 4:11
3. "Disappearing" – 3:11
4. "Ocean of Confusion" – 3:05
5. "Shadow of the Season" – 4:34
6. "Nearly Lost You" – 4:07
7. "Dollar Bill" – 4:34
8. "More or Less" – 3:10
9. "For Celebrations Past" – 4:09
10. "Julie Paradise" – 5:01
11. "Butterfly" – 3:22
12. "E.S.K." – 4:10
13. "Watchpocket Blues" (previously unreleased) – 5:14
14. "Paperback Bible" (previously unreleased) – 3:07
15. "Make My Mind" – 4:12
16. "Dying Days" – 4:51
17. "Sworn and Broken" – 3:34
18. "Witness" – 3:39
19. "Traveler" – 5:22

== Personnel ==
- Mark Lanegan – Vocals, selection
- Gary Lee Conner – Guitar, backing vocals
- Van Conner – Bass, backing vocals
- Barrett Martin – Drums, percussion
- Mark Pickerel – Drums, percussion
- Charles Peterson – Photography
- Howie Weinberg – Mastering
- Josh Cheuse – Art direction
- Ross Halfin – Photography
- Danny Clinch – Photography
- Jeff McGraph – Trumpet
- Jonas G. – Mixing
- Michael Azerrad – Liner notes
- Darren Salmieri – A&R
- Mark Unterberger – Packaging manager
- Lisa Buckler – Product manager
- 21st Street Singers – Vocals (background)
- Brian Klein – Project manager
- Milori – Cello
- John Agnello – Engineer
- Benmont Tench – Organ, Mellotron, piano, piano (electric)
- Chris Cornell – Vocals (background), producer
- Mike McCready – Guitar
- Terry Date – Producer
- George Drakoulias – Percussion, producer
- Don Fleming – Producer
- Chris Goss – Vocals (background)
- Brian Jenkins – Vocals (background)
