= Anthology: SST Years 1985–1989 =

Greatest hits album by Screaming Trees
- Released: July 16, 1991
- Recorded: 1985–1989
- Studio: Velvetone Studios, Ellensburg, Washington; Reciprocal Recording, Seattle, Washington
- Genre: Grunge; neo-psychedelia; alternative rock; post-punk
- Length: 1:13:50
- Label: SST (260)
- Producer: Steve Fisk; Jack Endino; Screaming Trees

Screaming Trees chronology
Uncle Anesthesia (1991)	Anthology: SST Years 1985–1989 (1991)	Sweet Oblivion (1992)

Professional ratings
Review scores
Source	Rating
Allmusic	4.5/5 stars
Spin Alternative Record Guide	7/10

Anthology: SST Years 1985–1989 is the first compilation album by the Screaming Trees, covering their tenure under SST Records. Released in 1991, about six months after their major label debut album Uncle Anesthesia, Anthology consists of three songs from the Other Worlds EP, and six each from the Even If and Especially When, Invisible Lantern, and Buzz Factory albums. Because the Screaming Trees had switched labels from SST to Epic Records, the band had nothing to do with the creation of this compilation album.

== Track listing ==
All tracks are written by Screaming Trees.

No.	Title	Length
1.	"Barriers"	2:53
2.	"The Turning"	2:46
3.	"Other Worlds"	2:39
4.	"Transfiguration"	3:55
5.	"Don't Look Down"	2:55
6.	"Cold Rain"	3:36
7.	"In the Forest"	4:06
8.	"Back Together"	2:15
9.	"Other Days and Different Planets"	3:14
10.	"Walk Through to This Side"	2:34
11.	"Smokerings"	3:45
12.	"Ivy"	3:19
13.	"Grey Diamond Desert"	4:24
14.	"Night Comes Creeping"	3:54
15.	"Invisible Lantern"	3:04
16.	"Subtle Poison"	3:51
17.	"Windows"	2:42
18.	"Black Sun Morning"	5:01
19.	"Flower Web"	3:41
20.	"End of the Universe"	5:48
21.	"Where the Twain Shall Meet"	3:28
Total length:		1:13:50

Tracks 1 to 3 are from the Other Worlds EP, tracks 4 to 9 are from Even If and Especially When, tracks 10 to 15 are from Invisible Lantern and tracks 16 to 21 are from Buzz Factory.

== Personnel ==
Screaming Trees

- Mark Lanegan – lead vocals
- Gary Lee Conner – guitar, backing vocals
- Van Conner – bass, backing vocals
- Mark Pickerel – drums, percussion

Additional

- Steve Fisk – producer (tracks 1 to 15), organ on "The Turning", piano on "Grey Diamond Desert"
- Jack Endino – producer (tracks 16 to 21), backing vocals on "Black Sun Morning"
- Rod Doak – backing vocals on "Cold Rain"
