= The Dark Fantastic =

American rock band

- Origin: Seattle, Washington, U.S.
- Genres: Hard rock, desert rock, psychedelic rock, indie
- Years active: 1997–2001
- Label: Up
- Members: Mark Pickerel; Jesse Roberts; Mike Elkins

The Dark Fantastic was an American rock band from Seattle, Washington, formed in 1997. They began as a solo project of Mark Pickerel while he was still a member of Truly. Following the disbanding of Truly, Pickerel turned his project into a band, enlisting guitarist Jesse Roberts and bassist Mike Elkins in 1997. They released their self-titled debut album in 1999 and their second album entitled Goodbye Crooked Scar in 2001, both through Up Records, before disbanding.

== History ==
=== Formation and self-titled debut album (1990–1999) ===
Musician Mark Pickerel had previously been the drummer of Seattle rock band Screaming Trees, playing on their first five studio albums, before departing the band in 1991. He formed Truly with former Soundgarden bassist Hiro Yamamoto and former Storybook Krooks singer Robert Roth, who also performed guitar duties, in 1990 and continued with the group following his departure from the Screaming Trees. It was during Pickerel's time in Truly that he formed The Dark Fantastic as a solo project. Following the release of Truly's last album, Pickerel added guitarist Jesse Roberts and bassist Mike Elkins to the lineup, to turn the solo project into a band, in 1997.

With producer Martin Feveyear, they began working on their debut album, with Pickerel's former Screaming Trees bandmate Van Conner contributing bass to the songs "Wind Forever" and "As You Were Leaving." For the recording of the album, Feveyear also contributed keyboards while Pickerel handled vocals, drums, percussion and additional guitars. Released through Up Records, The Dark Fantastic was met with positive reviews. Reviewing for Allmusic, Becky Byrkit stated that Pickerel is "still as much the brisk indie guitar player and risk-taker as before" and that "the tunes are generally fine even-handed melodies, with some crunchy, button-punching studio technics [...] plus some liberally atomized melancholia just to keep you serious." M. Tye Comer, of CMJ commented that Pickerel "leans heavily on dark and dusty Southwestern forms, but he also dabbles in Brian Wilson-esque pop, sludgy indie rock" and "Gary Numan-inspired synth pop" and that The Dark Fantastic "is an impressive debut, spearheaded by a soulful, season musician."

=== Goodbye Crooked Scar and disbanding (2000–2001) ===
Pickerel did session work for a number of musicians, Neko Case and Jim Carroll among others, before beginning work on The Dark Fantastic's second album. Working again with Martin Feveyear, the album featured additional vocals by Vanessa Veselka. Released in 2001, The Dark Fantastic's second album entitled Goodbye Crooked Scar was met with positive reviews. Charles Spano, reviewing for Allmusic, commented that "Goodbye Crooked Scar focuses that psychedelia on hard desert rock with a wholly unique Far Eastern vibe" and that "Mark Pickerel sings like Brian Wilson chanting beautiful eulogies for lost loves and lives," while he also complimented Roberts' and Elkin's contributions to the album. Reviewing for PopMatters, Eden Miller stated that "The Dark Fantastic brings maturity to their angst-filled music" describing the album as "elegantly melancholy" and that "Goodbye Crooked Star is an unexpected surprise." By the end of the year, The Dark Fantastic disbanded. Following the disbanding of the group, Pickerel released his debut studio album Snake in the Radio in 2006, credited as Mark Pickerel and His Praying Hands, and the follow-up Cody's Dream in 2008.

== Musical style ==
The Dark Fantastic's music has been described as dark, haunting, psychedelic desert rock drawing influences from Pink Floyd, Echo & the Bunnymen and Neko Case. Pickerel also gained a number of comparisons to Brian Wilson for his vocals.

== Band members ==
- Mark Pickerel – vocals, guitar, drums, percussion
- Jesse Roberts – guitar
- Mike Elkins – bass

== Discography ==
Studio albums

- The Dark Fantastic (1999)
- Goodbye Crooked Scar (2001)
