= Change Has Come =

EP by Screaming Trees
- Released: December 1, 1989
- Recorded: 1989
- Studios: Reciprocal Recording, Seattle, Washington
- Genres: Grunge; psychedelia
- Length: 17:36
- Labels: Sub Pop (048); Glitterhouse (080)
- Producers: Steve Fisk; Jack Endino

Screaming Trees chronology
Buzz Factory (1989)	Change Has Come (1989)	Something About Today (1990)

Professional ratings
Review scores
Source	Rating
AllMusic	3/5 stars
Spin Alternative Record Guide	6/10

Change Has Come is the second EP by the Screaming Trees. It was the only recording the band released through Sub Pop. After its 1990 release, the Screaming Trees moved on to a major label, Epic Records, for their next three albums - Uncle Anesthesia, Sweet Oblivion, and Dust, as well as the Something About Today EP. The album's cover art was photographed by Charles Peterson.

Drummer Mark Pickerel described the EP as "our best recorded moment"

== Track listing ==
All tracks are written by Screaming Trees, except where noted.

Change Has Come track listing
No.	Title	Length
1.	"Change Has Come"	3:19
2.	"Days"	3:48
3.	"Flashes"	3:50
4.	"Time Speaks Her Golden Tongue"	3:36
5.	"I've Seen You Before" (CD only)	3:11
Total length:		17:36

== Personnel ==
Screaming Trees

- Mark Lanegan – lead vocals
- Gary Lee Conner – guitar, trumpet
- Van Conner – bass, backing vocals
- Mark Pickerel – percussion, drums

Additional

- Steve Fisk – production (1, 2)
- Jack Endino – production (3, 4)
- Charles Peterson – photography
- Carol Hibbs – mastering
