= Beat Happening/Screaming Trees =

EP by Beat Happening and Screaming Trees
- Released: April 1988
- Recorded: July 1987, New World Video, Ellensburg, Washington
- Genre: Alternative rock
- Length: 12:27
- Label: K/Homestead HMS110-1
- Producer: Steve Fisk

Beat Happening and Screaming Trees chronology
Even If and Especially When (1987)	Beat Happening/Screaming Trees (1988)	Invisible Lantern (1988)

Professional ratings
Review scores
Source	Rating
Allmusic	4/5 stars
Spin Alternative Record Guide	7/10

Beat Happening/Screaming Trees is an EP and a one-off collaboration between Beat Happening (from Olympia, Washington) and Screaming Trees (from Ellensburg, Washington). The 12-inch EP was originally released on Homestead Records in 1988, and it was later reissued as part of Beat Happening's box set Crashing Through in 2002. The journal of Kurt Cobain contains a draft of a letter sent to Mark Lanegan, in which he described "Polly Pereguinn" as his favorite pop song of the 1980s.

The album itself was recorded in the back room of the Conner's family video store, New World Video, which was also used as a practice space for the Screaming Trees.

== Track listing ==
1. "Sea Babies"
2. "Tales of Brave Aphrodite"
3. "Polly Pereguinn"
4. "I Dig You"

== Credits ==
Personnel

- Mark Lanegan - Vocals
- Calvin Johnson - Vocals
- Heather Lewis - Drums, Backing Vocals
- Gary Lee Conner - Guitar, Backing Vocals
- Van Conner - Bass, Backing Vocals
- Bret Lunsford - Guitar
- Mark Pickerel - Drums

Additional Personnel

- Steve Fisk - Producer
- Chris Gehringer - Mastering
