= Winter Songs Tour Tracks =

EP by Screaming Trees
- Released: 1992
- Recorded: June 1990 and March 1992
- Genres: Grunge, neo-psychedelia
- Label: Epic
- Producers: Screaming Trees, Terry Date, Chris Cornell, Don Fleming

Screaming Trees chronology
Sweet Oblivion (1992)	Winter Songs Tour Tracks (1992)	Dust (1996)

Winter Songs Tour Tracks is the fourth EP released by Screaming Trees. The CD was issued as a promo for the band while on tour with Alice in Chains and Gruntruck in Fall 1992.

== Track listing ==
1. "Nearly Lost You"
2. "Bed of Roses"
3. "Something About Today (Numb Inversion Version)"
4. "E.S.K."
5. "Troubled Times"
6. "Dollar Bill"
7. "Tomorrow's Dream" (Black Sabbath cover)
8. "Shadow Of The Season"
