= Nearly Lost You (album) =

Greatest hits album by Screaming Trees
- Released: 2001
- Recorded: July 1, 2001
- Genre: Grunge
- Label: Epic

Screaming Trees chronology
Dust (1996)	Nearly Lost You (2001)	Ocean of Confusion: Songs of Screaming Trees 1990-1996 (2005)

Professional ratings
Review scores
Source	Rating
Allmusic	3.5/5 stars

Nearly Lost You (titled after the single of the same name) is the second greatest hits compilation of the Screaming Trees, released in 2001.

== Track listing ==
No.	Title	Length
1.	"Halo of Ashes"	4:07
2.	"Nearly Lost You"	4:07
3.	"Butterfly"	3:22
4.	"Alice Said"	4:13
5.	"Dying Days"	4:51
6.	"Shadow of the Season"	4:33
7.	"All I Know"	3:55
8.	"Something About Today"	3:03
9.	"Uncle Anesthesia"	3:53
10.	"Ocean of Confusion"	3:06
