= Girl Don't Tell Me =

- U.S. picture sleeve (reverse)

Single by the Beach Boys

from the album Summer Days (And Summer Nights!!)
- A-side: "Barbara Ann"
- Released: December 20, 1965
- Recorded: April 30, 1965
- Studio: Western, Hollywood
- Genre: Folk rock
- Length: 2:19
- Label: Capitol
- Songwriter: Brian Wilson
- Producer: Brian Wilson

The Beach Boys singles chronology
"The Little Girl I Once Knew" (1965)	"Barbara Ann" / "Girl Don't Tell Me" (1965)	"Sloop John B" (1966)

Licensed audio
- "Girl Don't Tell Me" on YouTube

"Girl Don't Tell Me" is a song written by Brian Wilson for the American rock band the Beach Boys, released on July 5, 1965 on the album Summer Days (And Summer Nights!!). It was later included as the B-side of the group's single "Barbara Ann," which was released on December 20, 1965.

== Origins ==
Brian Wilson wrote the song in early 1965 while on a honeymoon with Marilyn. He recalled that "a whole song came to me. It was 'Girl Don't Tell Me.' I didn't have any way to get it down. But I just heard the whole thing up there, from start to finish, and I remembered it well enough to go later and write down the lyrics on a piece of paper."

== Recording ==
The Beach Boys recorded "Girl Don't Tell Me" on April 30, 1965 at United Western Recorders. Chuck Britz was the engineer. It was one of the first songs to feature Carl Wilson as lead vocalist and is one of the few Beach Boys tracks from the era to feature no backing vocals.

Beach Boys biographer David Leaf has likened "Girl Don't Tell Me" to the Beatles' 1965 single "Ticket to Ride," in terms of its guitar breaks, drum fills and vocal delivery. Brian Wilson cited this as an example of how each new Beatles release over this period inspired him as a songwriter, and how, with "Girl Don't Tell Me," "I even tried writing a Beatles song." He said that Carl's drawn-out phrasing over the words "you'll write" was taken from "Ticket to Ride". It has been claimed that Brian intended to submit "Girl Don't Tell Me" to the Beatles.

== Reception ==
Cash Box described it as a "pretty, medium-paced tale of remorse."

== Personnel ==
Sourced from Musician's Union AFM contract sheets and surviving session audio, documented by Craig Slowinski.

The Beach Boys

- Bruce Johnston – celesta
- Brian Wilson – bass guitar
- Carl Wilson – lead vocals, 12-string guitar, acoustic guitar
- Dennis Wilson – drums

Additional musicians

- Ron Swallow – tambourine

== Covers ==
- 1965 – Keith Green
- 1966 – Tony Rivers
- 1967 - The Collage (on Coliseum records)
- 1980 – The Smithereens, Girls About Town
- 1981 - Gyllene Tider, Swing & Sweet (EP) (as 'Ge mig inte det där')
- 1995 - Heartworms, Space Escapade
- 1996 – Fuzzy, Electric Juices
- 2000 – Truly, Twilight Curtains
- 2000 – Souvenir, Caroline Now!: The Songs of Brian Wilson and the Beach Boys (as "Ne dis pas")
- 2001 – Al Jardine, Live in Las Vegas
- 2008 – Vivian Girls
- 2011 – My Cousin, The Emperor, Don't Steal the Covers!
- 2021 – The Anderson Council, Jem Records Celebrates Brian Wilson
