= Caroline Now!: The Songs of Brian Wilson and the Beach Boys =

Compilation album by various artists
- Released: August 4, 2000
- Recorded: 1998–2000
- Genre: Indie rock
- Length: 77:14
- Label: Marina
- Producer: Stefan Kassel, Frank Lähnemann

Caroline Now!: The Songs of Brian Wilson and the Beach Boys is a 2000 tribute album devoted to songs by the Beach Boys, consisting of cover versions recorded by independent artists. The chosen material focuses on rarities by the group, some of them available only as bootleg recordings such as Adult/Child and Sweet Insanity. The album took nearly three years to produce, with sunshine pop outfit the Free Design reuniting to contribute one track after a three-decade absence from recording.

== Reception ==
Professional ratings
Review scores
Source	Rating
AllMusic	4/5 stars
Melody Maker	3.5/5 stars
NME	7/10
Q	3/5 stars
Rolling Stone	4/5 stars

Jason Ankeny of AllMusic wrote in a mostly positive review, "by and large, the disc boasts an artistry and consistency most tributes lack, thanks as much to the brilliance of its subject as to the torch-carrying affections of its contributors." Uncut magazine named it their album of the month, while NME named it their compilation of the month.

== Track listing ==
1. Eugene Kelly: "Lady"
2. Alex Chilton: "I Wanna Pick You Up"
3. June & The Exit Wounds: "All I Wanna Do"
4. Katrina Mitchell & Bill Wells: "Wind Chimes"
5. The High Llamas: "Anna Lee, The Healer"
6. Souvenir: "Ne Dis Pas (Girl Don't Tell Me)"
7. Duglas T. Stewart: "Lines"
8. Camping: "Busy Doin' Nothin'"
9. Stevie Jackson: "Good Time"
10. The Free Design: "Endless Harmony"
11. The Pearlfishers: "Go Away Boy"
12. Saint Etienne: "Stevie"
13. The Radio Sweethearts: "Honkin' Down The Highway"
14. Eric Matthews: "Lonely Sea"
15. Kle: "Rainbow Eyes"
16. Chip Taylor & Evie Sands: "Let's Put Our Hearts Together"
17. Peter Thomas Sound Orchestra: "Pet Sounds"
18. Malcolm Ross: "Heroes and Villains"
19. Norman Blake: "Only With You"
20. The Aluminum Group: "Caroline, No"
21. Jad Fair: "Do Ya"
22. The Secret Goldfish: "Big Sur"
23. David Ritchie Coalition: "Good Timin'"
24. Kim Fowley: "Almost Summer"

== See also ==
- List of cover versions of Beach Boys songs
