= Dying Days =

1996 song by Screaming Trees

Song by Screaming Trees

from the album Dust
- Released: June 15, 1996
- Recorded: 1995–1996 at Capitol Studios and Sunset Sound Factory, Hollywood, CA and The Hit Factory, NY
- Genre: Grunge, alternative rock, neo-psychedelia
- Length: 4:51
- Label: Epic
- Songwriters: Gary Lee Conner, Van Conner, Mark Lanegan
- Producer: George Drakoulias

"Dying Days" is a song by the American alternative rock group Screaming Trees. It is the fourth track on their seventh album Dust, released on June 25, 1996. Guitarist Mike McCready of Pearl Jam performed the guitar solo on the song. By this time, McCready had worked with Mark Lanegan in the band Mad Season. The lyrics of the song deal with the numerous deaths that occurred in Seattle's music community during that time.

== Personnel ==
Adapted from the Dust liner notes.

Screaming Trees

- Gary Lee Conner – acoustic guitar, electric guitar, backing vocals
- Van Conner – bass guitar, backing vocals
- Mark Lanegan – lead vocals
- Barrett Martin – drums, percussion

Additional musicians

- 21st Street Singers – backing vocals
- Mike McCready – guitar solo

Production and additional personnel

- George Drakoulias – production
- Andy Wallace – mixing
- Howie Weinberg – mastering
