= Last Words: The Final Recordings =

Studio album by Screaming Trees
- Released: August 2, 2011
- Recorded: 1998–1999
- Studio: Studio Litho, Seattle, Washington
- Genre: Grunge, alternative rock
- Length: 38:44
- Label: Sunyata Productions
- Producer: Barrett Martin

Screaming Trees chronology
Ocean of Confusion: Songs of Screaming Trees 1990–1996 (2005)	Last Words: The Final Recordings (2011)	Wrong Turn To Jahannam: Live From Egg Studio 1991 (2023)

Professional ratings
Review scores
Source	Rating
AllMusic	3.5/5 stars
The A.V. Club	B
Drowned in Sound	6/10
Pitchfork Media	5.7/10

Last Words: The Final Recordings is the eighth and final studio album by the American rock band the Screaming Trees. The album itself was recorded two years after their album Dust. Shortly after Dust was released, Epic Records decided to drop the band. However, in the years of 1998 and 1999, the band recorded the album in Pearl Jam's guitarist Stone Gossard's studio. Due to the band's break-up in 2000, and Mark Lanegan's refusal to perform with the band, the album wasn't released for twelve years until drummer Barrett Martin released it on his own label, Sunyata Records. The album received mixed reviews.

== Track listing ==
All tracks are written by Van Conner, Mark Lanegan, Barrett Martin, and Gary Lee Conner.

No.	Title	Length
1.	"Ash Gray Sunday"	3:36
2.	"Door Into Summer"	3:27
3.	"Revelator"	4:33
4.	"Crawlspace"	4:19
5.	"Black Rose Way"	4:23
6.	"Reflections"	4:06
7.	"Tomorrow Changes"	3:51
8.	"Low Life"	3:49
9.	"Anita Grey"	3:36
10.	"Last Words"	3:04
Total length:		38:44

== Personnel ==
Screaming Trees

- Gary Lee Conner – lead guitar, piano, clavinet, backing vocals
- Van Conner – bass guitar, backing vocals
- Mark Lanegan – lead vocals
- Barrett Martin – drums, Hammond organ, Fender Rhodes, vibraphone, percussion

Additional musicians

- Peter Buck – guitars
- Josh Homme – guitar on "Crawlspace"
