= Something About Today =

- Original album artwork by Mark Ryden

EP by Screaming Trees
- Released: 1990
- Genre: Acid rock
- Length: 14:25
- Label: Epic
- Producer: Terry Date; Chris Cornell; Screaming Trees

Screaming Trees chronology
Change Has Come (1989)	Something About Today (1990)	Uncle Anesthesia (1991)

Professional ratings
Review scores
Source	Rating
AllMusic	3/5 stars
Spin Alternative Record Guide	7/10

Something About Today is the major label debut and third overall EP by the Screaming Trees, and also a single (for the title track), released on Epic Records. It would be followed up by their first full album for the label, Uncle Anesthesia, in 1991. Two of the tracks from the EP ("Uncle Anesthesia" and "Ocean of Confusion") were later reused on the Uncle Anesthesia album, while a third, "Who Lies in Darkness," was later compiled on the Ocean of Confusion collection. The "Numb Inversion Version" of "Something About Today" remains exclusive to this EP. The 12" vinyl version contains all the songs on side A, while side B contains etchings made by the band. Notable music photographer Charles Peterson provided photography for the album.

A promotional single for the song "Something About Today" was also released in 1991. The b-side of the single contained two previously unreleased tracks, "This Perfect Day" and "New Day Yesterday".

== Track listing ==
1. "Uncle Anesthesia" (Mark Lanegan, Lee Gary Conner, Van Conner) – 3:50
2. "Who Lies in Darkness" (Lanegan, L. Conner) – 4:02
3. "Ocean of Confusion" (Lanegan, L. Conner) – 3:00
4. "Something About Today (Numb Inversion Version)" (Lanegan, L. Conner) – 3:33
