= Sworn and Broken =

Single by Screaming Trees

from the album Dust
- B-side: "Butterfly" (live)
- Released: November 23, 1996
- Recorded: 1995–1996
- Studio: Capitol Studios and Sunset Sound Factory, Hollywood, CA and The Hit Factory, NY
- Genre: Grunge, alternative rock, neo-psychedelia
- Length: 3:35
- Label: Epic
- Songwriters: Gary Lee Conner, Van Conner, Mark Lanegan
- Producer: George Drakoulias

Screaming Trees singles chronology
"Traveler" (1996)	"Sworn and Broken" (1996)

"Sworn and Broken" is a song by the American alternative-rock group Screaming Trees. It is the second single released in support of their seventh album, Dust and the band's final single before their 2000 breakup.

== Formats and track listing ==
UK 7" single (663870 7)

1. "Sworn and Broken" (Gary Lee Conner, Van Conner, Mark Lanegan) – 3:35
2. "Butterfly" (live) (Gary Lee Conner, Van Conner, Mark Lanegan) – 3:10

UK CD single (663870 2)

1. "Sworn and Broken" (Gary Lee Conner, Van Conner, Mark Lanegan) – 3:35
2. "Butterfly" (live) (Gary Lee Conner, Van Conner, Mark Lanegan) – 3:10
3. "Dollar Bill" (live) (Van Conner, Mark Lanegan) – 4:17
4. "Caught Between/The Secret Kind" (live) (Gary Lee Conner, Van Conner, Mark Lanegan, Barrett Martin) – 7:38

== Charts ==
Chart (1996)	Peak position
UK Singles (Official Charts)	76

== Personnel ==
Adapted from the Sworn and Broken liner notes.

Screaming Trees

- Gary Lee Conner – acoustic guitar, electric guitar, backing vocals
- Van Conner – bass guitar, backing vocals
- Mark Lanegan – lead vocals
- Barrett Martin – drums, percussion

Production and additional personnel

- George Drakoulias – production
- Dean Karr – photography
- Andy Wallace – mixing
- Howie Weinberg – mastering

== Release history ==
Region	Date	Label	Format	Catalog
United Kingdom	1996	Epic	CD, LP	663870
United States	1996	Epic	CD	ESK 8632
