= Runaway (Jim Carroll album) =

EP by Jim Carroll
- Released: 3 October 2000
- Genre: Punk
- Length: 18:28
- Label: Kill Rock Stars
- Producer: Robert Roth

Professional ratings
Review scores
Source	Rating
Allmusic	3/5 stars

Runaway is a 2000 EP album by author and punk rock musician Jim Carroll and his final solo studio work before his death in 2009.

== Track listing ==
1. "Runaway" (Del Shannon, Max Crook) - (4:24)
2. "Hairshirt Fracture" (Carroll, Robert Roth) - (4:24)
3. "I Want the Angel" (Carroll, Brian Linsley) - (2:51)
4. "It's Too Late" (Carroll, Wayne Woods) - (2:58)
5. "Falling Down Laughing" (Carroll, Robert Roth) - (3:51)

Track 2 is a 1994 demo from Pools of Mercury
Tracks 3–5 recorded live at the Crocodile Cafe, Seattle on 17 November 1998

== Personnel ==
- Jim Carroll - vocals
- Gary Valentine - rhythm guitar on "Runaway"
- Mark Pickerel - drums
- Robert Roth - guitar, organ
- Kurt Bloch - guitar
- Brian Young - drums
- George Reed-Harmon - bass
- Hiro Yamamoto - bass on "Hairshirt Fracture"
