= Other Worlds (Screaming Trees album) =

EP by Screaming Trees
- Released: 1986 (Velvetone, MC); 1988 (SST, CD, LP)
- Recorded: Summer 1985
- Studio: Creative Fire Studio, Ellensburg, Washington
- Genre: Psychedelic rock; post-punk
- Length: 14:57
- Label: Velvetone; SST (105)
- Producer: Steve Fisk

Screaming Trees chronology
Other Worlds (1986)	Clairvoyance (1986)

Professional ratings
Review scores
Source	Rating
AllMusic	2/5 stars
Spin Alternative Record Guide	5/10

Other Worlds is Screaming Trees' 1986 debut EP. It was produced by Steve Fisk and recorded in 1985 at his studio in Ellensburg, WA. It was released on Velvetone Records the following year as a cassette only release, and distributed by K Records. The album was later re-released on CD and 12" black vinyl by SST Records in 1988.

Steve Fisk recalled that during the recording process the band faced him and Sam Albright in the studio as if it was a live show. In his 2020 memoir, Mark Lanegan stated that the song 'Pictures in My Mind' was the first Screaming Trees song that he wrote with Gary Lee Conner in the Conner's house in Ellensburg, Washington.

== Track listing ==
All tracks are written by Screaming Trees.

No.	Title	Length
1.	"Like I Said"	2:34
2.	"Pictures in My Mind"	2:00
3.	"The Turning"	2:47
4.	"Other Worlds"	2:39
5.	"Barriers"	2:51
6.	"Now Your Mind Is Next to Mine"	2:04
Total length:		14:57

== Personnel ==
Screaming Trees

- Mark Lanegan – vocals
- Gary Lee Conner – guitar
- Van Conner – bass
- Mark Pickerel – drums, cover art

Additional

- Steve Fisk – producer, organ on "The Turning" and "Pictures in My Mind"
- Sam Albright – engineering
- Matt Varnum – photography
