= Someone Somewhere... =

Someone, Somewhere...

Studio album by Robert Roth
- Released: May 4, 2004
- Recorded: 2001–2004
- Genre: Psychedelic rock
- Length: 72:00
- Label: Pattern 25
- Producer: Robert Roth

Professional ratings
Review scores
Source	Rating
AllMusic	4/5 stars
Uncut	2/5 stars

Someone, Somewhere... is the first solo album by American musician Robert Roth, released on May 4, 2004, through Pattern 25 Records.

== Track listing ==
1. "Vicki and Jacky" – 5:06
2. "Someone, Somewhere..." – 3:48
3. "Relive These X" – 4:45
4. "The Poison Arrow" – 5:38
5. "The Call of the Wild" – 5:17
6. "Streetplay '99" – 3:59
7. "Lightning & Thunder" – 3:14
8. "Blackout City Serenade" – 6:16
9. "Halliburton Blues" – 4:01
10. "Walk All Over Downtown Life" – 5:14
11. "Laugh Til We Cry" – 6:09
12. "L&T 2" – 4:26
13. "Under the Ever-Watchful Eye" – 3:50
14. "Real Life Story" – 4:16
15. "Yesterday's War" – 6:20

== Personnel ==
All songs are written arranged, recorded, produced and engineered by Robert Roth at Space Blanket Studios.
Vocals, guitars, piano, Mellotron, Farfisa, Hammond organ, analog synthesizers, bass and drums performed by Robert Roth (except where noted below).

- George Reed-Harmon – bass on "Vicky & Jacky" and "L&T 2"
- Orn Johari – background vocals on "Poison Arrow", "Call of the Wild" and "Laugh Til we Cry"
- Billy Joe Huel – trumpets on "Walk all Over Downtown Life" and "Yesterday's War"
- Jesse Roberts – trumpets on "L&T 2" and "Real Life Story"
- Chris Friel – drums on "Streetplay '99" and "Someone, Somewhere..."
- Mark Pickerel – drums on "Streetplay '99" and "Someone, Somewhere..."
- Kari Welch – cello on "Lightning and Thunder" and "Real Life Story"
- Lynn Gosnell – background vocals on "Vicky & Jacky" and "Yesterday's War"
