= Clairvoyance (album) =

Studio album by Screaming Trees
- Released: February 13, 1986
- Recorded: Winter 1985
- Studio: Velvetone, Ellensburg, WA
- Genre: Psychedelic rock; hard rock; garage rock
- Length: 37:42
- Label: Velvetone, Hall of Records
- Producer: Steve Fisk, Screaming Trees

Screaming Trees chronology
| Other Worlds (1986) | Clairvoyance (1986) | Even If and Especially When (1987) |

Clairvoyance is the 1986 debut studio album by the alternative rock band Screaming Trees, produced by Steve Fisk. Released on Velvetone Records, the album helped the band earn a contract with SST Records. While it is very much a combination of psychedelic and garage rock, it bears many similarities to early grunge. It was original limited to a pressing of 2,500 copies, which included full size, double sided inserts. In January 2005, it was re-issued on CD by Hall of Records.

Steve Fisk stated that after completing the record he attempted to book a tour for the band and sent their album to local radio stations with little to no traction, stating that "no one wanted to hear about a band from Eastern Washington".

== Reception ==
Professional ratings
Review scores
| Source | Rating |
|---|---|
| AllMusic | 3/5 stars |
| Spin Alternative Record Guide | 5/10 |

Soundgarden guitarist Kim Thayil listed Clairvoyance as one of his favourite grunge albums, stating: "I like Clairvoyance for the song “Clairvoyance,” but my favorite song on there is probably “I See Stars” followed by “Orange Airplane.” After this album, they kind of fattened up their sound."

== Track listing ==
All tracks are written by Screaming Trees.

| No. | Title | Length |
|---|---|---|
| 1. | "Orange Airplane" | 3:02 |
| 2. | "You Tell Me All These Things" | 2:12 |
| 3. | "Standing on the Edge" | 5:39 |
| 4. | "Forever" | 4:22 |
| 5. | "Seeing and Believing" | 3:35 |
| 6. | "I See Stars" | 4:32 |
| 7. | "Lonely Girl" | 3:06 |
| 8. | "Strange Out Here" | 4:27 |
| 9. | "The Turning" | 2:44 |
| 10. | "Clairvoyance" | 4:03 |

== Personnel ==
Screaming Trees

- Mark Lanegan – vocals, violin on "Strange Out Here"
- Gary Lee Conner – electric guitar, organ on "You Tell Me"
- Van Conner – bass guitar
- Mark Pickerel – drums

Additional musicians

- Joey Conner – backing vocals on "Orange Airplane"
- Steve Fisk – producer, piano on "Lonely Girl" and "Clairvoyance," organ on "The Turning"
- Michael Peterson – backing vocals on "Lonely Girl"

Additional personnel

- Sam Albright – cover design
- John Golden – mastering
