= Invisible Lantern =

Studio album by Screaming Trees
- Released: May 12, 1988
- Recorded: Winter 1987
- Studio: Velvetone, Ellensburg, Washington
- Genre: Alternative rock; grunge; garage pop
- Length: 40:43
- Label: SST (188)
- Producer: Steve Fisk, Screaming Trees

Screaming Trees chronology
Beat Happening/ Screaming Trees (1988)	Invisible Lantern (1988)	Buzz Factory (1989)

Professional ratings
Review scores
Source	Rating
AllMusic	3/5 stars
The Encyclopedia of Popular Music	3/5 stars
MusicHound Rock: The Essential Album Guide	3/5 stars
Spin Alternative Record Guide	7/10

Invisible Lantern is the third studio album by alternative rock band Screaming Trees, released in 1988 on SST Records.

== Critical reception ==
Trouser Press wrote that "the Trees’ pop streak matures with 'Smokerings' and especially the marvelous 'Night Comes Creeping'." The Spin Alternative Record Guide called the album the band's SST peak.

== In other media ==
While recording Invisible Lantern, Mark Lanegan, Mark Pickerel, and Van Conner appeared in the independent film Fertilichrone Cheerleader Massacre along with producer Steve Fisk, which was shot in Ellensburg by Shawn O'Neill. The film was most recently released in 2012.

== Track listing ==
All tracks are written by Screaming Trees.

Invisible Lantern track listing
No.	Title	Length
1.	"Ivy"	3:16
2.	"Walk Through to This Side"	2:32
3.	"Lines & Circles"	3:45
4.	"She Knows"	2:15
5.	"Shadow Song"	4:15
6.	"Grey Diamond Desert"	4:22
7.	"Smokerings"	3:43
8.	"The Second I Awake"	2:59
9.	"Invisible Lantern"	3:02
10.	"Even If"	3:48
11.	"Direction of the Sun"	2:53
12.	"Night Comes Creeping"	3:53
Total length:		40:43

== Personnel ==
Screaming Trees

- Mark Lanegan – vocals
- Gary Lee Conner – guitar, organ
- Van Conner – bass
- Mark Pickerel – drums

Additional personnel

- Steve Fisk – producer, piano on "Grey Diamond Desert"
- Rod Doak – engineering
- Daniel Herron – front cover artwork
- Jena Scott – photographs and lettering
