= Even If and Especially When =

Studio album by Screaming Trees
- Released: March 28, 1987
- Recorded: 1986
- Studios: Velvetone, Ellensburg, WA
- Genres: Proto-grunge, garage rock
- Length: 36:24
- Label: SST (132)
- Producers: Steve Fisk, Screaming Trees

Screaming Trees chronology
Clairvoyance (1986)	Even If and Especially When (1987)	Beat Happening/ Screaming Trees (1988)

Even If and Especially When is the second studio album by the Ellensburg, Washington, band Screaming Trees, released in 1987. It was their first album released on SST.

== Critical reception ==
Professional ratings
Review scores
Source	Rating
AllMusic	3/5 stars
The Encyclopedia of Popular Music	3/5 stars
MusicHound Rock	4/5 stars
Spin Alternative Record Guide	6/10

The Encyclopedia of Popular Music called Even If and Especially When "the best of three strong albums for SST." Trouser Press wrote: "Dropping the baby fat (well, some of it) without compromising the trademark garagey roar, the band hit on a sound it would gradually refine on each successive release."

== Track listing ==
All tracks are written by Screaming Trees.

No.	Title	Length
1.	"Transfiguration"	3:53
2.	"Straight Out to Any Place"	2:00
3.	"World Painted"	2:59
4.	"Don't Look Down"	2:53
5.	"Girl Behind the Mask"	2:33
6.	"Flying"	3:14
7.	"Cold Rain"	3:34
8.	"Other Days and Different Planets"	3:12
9.	"The Pathway"	3:25
10.	"You Know Where It's At"	2:29
11.	"Back Together"	2:08
12.	"In the Forest"	4:04

== Personnel ==
Screaming Trees

- Mark Lanegan – vocals
- Gary Lee Conner – guitar, electric organ
- Van Conner – bass
- Mark Pickerel – drums

Additional personnel

- Rod Doak – backing vocals on "Cold Rain"
- Steve Fisk – producer
- Diane Szukovathy – cover design
