= KLE =

KLE or Kle can refer to:

- Kaélé Airport, near Kaélé, Extrême-Nord, Cameroon
- Kaithal railway station, in Kaithal district, Haryana, India
- Karnatak Lingayat Education Society, society in Karnataka, India
- Klay, Liberia, a town
- Kle Creek, in Liberia
- Kulung language (Nepal), one of the Kiranti language spoken in Nepal
- Kurze literarische Enzyklopädie, a Soviet-era Russian-language encyclopedia
