= Solomon Grundy (band) =

American rock band

- Origin: Ellensburg, Washington, US
- Genre: Grunge
- Years active: 1989–1990
- Label: New Alliance
- Past members: Van Conner; Lee McCullough; Jim King; Sean Hollister

Solomon Grundy was an American grunge band from Ellensburg, Washington, formed in 1989 by Van Conner as a side project from his main band Screaming Trees.

== History ==
The band was formed by Conner as a side project outside of his full-time band Screaming Trees. In Solomon Grundy he performed lead vocals and played guitar, rather than playing bass guitar as with Screaming Trees. The band also included guitarist Lee McCullough, bassist Jim King, and drummer Sean Hollister. They released an album in 1990 on New Alliance Records. It was originally titled Stone Soup and Other Stories but this was later changed to simply Solomon Grundy.

The project ended in 1990 when Screaming Trees signed a major label deal, and Conner dedicated himself to that band's recording and touring schedule.

== Members ==
- Van Conner - vocals, guitar
- Lee McCullough - guitar
- Jim King - bass
- Sean Hollister - drums

== Discography ==
- Solomon Grundy (1990)
