= Feeling You Up =

Studio album by Truly
- Released: 1997
- Recorded: 1995–1997
- Genres: Alternative rock, psychedelic rock, grunge
- Length: 54:29
- Label: Thick
- Producers: Robert Roth, Truly, Andy Poehlman

Truly chronology
| Fast Stories... from Kid Coma (1995) | Feeling You Up (1997) | Twilight Curtains (2000) |

Professional ratings
Review scores
| Source | Rating |
|---|---|
| Allmusic | 4/5 stars |
| Pitchfork Media | (5.6/10) |

Feeling You Up is the second studio album by American rock band Truly, recorded from 1995 to 1997 and released in November 1997 on 12" vinyl and CD. "It's On Your Face" was used in Francis Ford Coppola's TV series First Wave episode 16 "The Undesirables."

== Track listing ==
All songs written by Robert Roth and Truly, except "Air Raid" and "It's on Your Face" written by Roth, Truly, and Chris Quinn

1. "(Intro) Public Access Girls" - 4:31
2. "Twilight Curtains" - 5:23
3. "Wait 'til the Night" - 6:00
4. "Air Raid" - 4:49
5. "It's On Your Face" - 4:52
6. "EM7" - 4:34
7. "Come Hither" - 2:57
8. "Leatherette Tears" - 4:02
9. "The Possessions" - 5:29
10. "Repulsion" - 7:14
11. "[Untitled]" - 4:36

== Personnel ==
- Hiro Yamamoto - bass, background vocals
- Mark Pickerel - drums, percussion, background vocals
- Robert Roth - vocals, guitar, piano, Hammond organ, Moog synthesizer, mellotron
- Also: Sally Barry, Eamon Nordquist
