= Souvenir (Spanish band) =

- Origin: Pamplona, Spain
- Genres: Indie pop, yé-yé, Europop, electropop
- Years active: 1999–present
- Labels: Jabalina, Shelflife, Tone Vendor
- Members: Patricia de la Fuente; J'aime Cristóbal; Pablo Errea
- Website: http://www.souvenirpop.com

Souvenir are an indie pop/electropop band formed in 1999 in Pamplona. Known for their blend of dreamy melodies and electronic influences, the group has released six studio albums, gaining recognition for their distinctive sound and bilingual lyrics in both Spanish and French.

== History ==
Souvenir perform their songs in French, sung by Patricia de la Fuente, and mainly written by multi-instrumentalist J'aime Cristóbal. They debuted with a 6-track self-titled EP in 2000, which was reissued in America by Shelflife Records, displaying Europop and bossanova influences. In 2001, their first full-length album, Points de Suspension, was released. Special editions of the record were released in Japan (on Tone Vendor records) and the United States (on Shelflife).

Their second album, Recto/Verso, was released in 2003, and the band were featured on several international compilations including a tribute album to Serge Gainsbourg.

Cristóbal was commissioned by French chanteuse Françoiz Breut to write songs for her Une Saison Volée album, which included his song Ciudad del Mar. Souvenir's third album was released in 2005, Des équilibres, featuring pop songs with pianos, mellow guitars and lap steel guitars. In 2006, they collaborated on the Brian Wilson tribute album Caroline Now!, which also featured Belle And Sebastian, Teenage Fanclub, Saint Etienne, The High Llamas, and The Pastels. The album Des équilibres followed.

Their fourth studio album, 64, issued in 2007, has an electropop style. The record was followed by an album of remixes by Johan Agebjörn and other artists. In a Stylus Magazine review, Dom Passantino opined, "Souvenir give us an austerity, poise, and hautiness [sic] of tone that would convince anyone they were born the wrong side of the Pyrenees". In 2009, Souvenir released their fifth album, Drums, Sex and Dance, which includes their first song in English (The Sun Goes Out).

On February 21, 2011, the new Souvenir album Travelogues was released.

== Discography ==
=== Albums ===
- Points de Suspension (2001) Jabalina/Shelflife
- Recto/verso (2003) Jabalina
- Des Equilibres (2005) Jabalina
- 64 (2007) Jabalina
- Drums, Sex and Dance (2009) Jabalina
- Travelogues (2011) Jabalina

=== Singles, EPs ===
- Souvenir EP (2000) Jabalina/Shelflife
- Premier essai (2001) Jabalina
- Présage de l’hiver (2005) Jabalina
- Extras 64 (2007) Jabalina
- Aime-moi (vinyl) (2010) Jabalina
