= Buzz Factory =

Studio album by Screaming Trees
- Released: April 19, 1989
- Recorded: December 1988
- Studios: Reciprocal, Seattle, Washington
- Genres: Psychedelic rock, garage rock, grunge
- Length: 39:23
- Label: SST (248)
- Producer: Jack Endino

Screaming Trees chronology
Invisible Lantern (1988)	Buzz Factory (1989)	Change Has Come (1989)

Buzz Factory is the fourth studio album by Seattle-based band Screaming Trees, released in the spring of 1989. It was their final record for SST Records before they moved on to their major label debut. The LP was available on translucent purple vinyl. While touring to support the album, SST had informed that band multiple times that their album would shortly be released. However, this failed to materialize until the last day of the tour, after which they elected to leave SST. Their next recording, the Change Has Come EP, was released in December 1989 on Sub Pop.

== Critical reception ==
Professional ratings
Review scores
Source	Rating
AllMusic	3.5/5 stars
Chicago Tribune	3.5/4 stars
Spin Alternative Record Guide	6/10

The Chicago Tribune wrote that the band "takes psychedelic garage-rock into the '90s, cranking up the wah-wah peddle to stun volume and riding a torrent of percussion."

== Track listing ==
All tracks are written by Screaming Trees.

No.	Title	Length
1.	"Where the Twain Shall Meet"	3:29
2.	"Windows"	2:42
3.	"Black Sun Morning"	5:03
4.	"Too Far Away"	3:37
5.	"Subtle Poison"	3:53
6.	"Yard Trip #7"	2:24
7.	"Flower Web"	3:41
8.	"Wish Bringer"	3:06
9.	"Revelation Revolution"	2:43
10.	"The Looking Glass Cracked"	3:36
11.	"End of the Universe"	6:11
Total length:		39:23

== Personnel ==
Screaming Trees

- Gary Lee Conner – guitar
- Mark Lanegan – vocals
- Van Conner – bass
- Mark Pickerel – drums

Additional

- Jack Endino – producetion; backing vocals on "Black Sun Morning"
- Screaming Trees – production
- Jena Scott – cover design
