= All I Know (Screaming Trees song) =

1996 single by Screaming Trees

Single by Screaming Trees

from the album Dust
- Released: June 1996
- Recorded: 1995–1996
- Studio: Capitol Studios and Sunset Sound Factory, Hollywood, CA and The Hit Factory, NYC
- Genre: Hard rock; psychedelic rock
- Length: 3:55
- Label: Epic
- Songwriters: Gary Lee Conner, Van Conner, Mark Lanegan
- Producer: George Drakoulias

Screaming Trees singles chronology
"Butterfly" (1993)	"All I Know" (1996)	"Traveler" (1996)

"All I Know" is a song by the American alternative rock group Screaming Trees. It is the first single released in support of their seventh album, Dust. The opening echoes "I Am The Walrus" while the guitar solo lifts from "Do You Feel Like We Do".

== Formats and track listing ==
UK CD single (658918 2)

1. "All I Know" (Gary Lee Conner, Van Conner, Mark Lanegan) – 3:55
2. "Wasted Time" (Gary Lee Conner, Van Conner, Mark Lanegan, Barrett Martin) – 3:52
3. "Silver Tongue" (Gary Lee Conner, Van Conner, Mark Lanegan, Barrett Martin) – 6:06

== Charts ==
Chart (1996)	Peak position
US Alternative Airplay (Billboard)	9
US Mainstream Rock (Billboard)	9
US Radio Songs (Billboard)	62
Canada Rock/Alternative (RPM)	7

== Personnel ==
Adapted from the All I Know liner notes.

Screaming Trees

- Gary Lee Conner – acoustic guitar, electric guitar, backing vocals
- Van Conner – bass guitar, backing vocals
- Mark Lanegan – lead vocals
- Barrett Martin – drums, percussion

Production and additional personnel

- George Drakoulias – production
- Andy Wallace – mixing
- Howie Weinberg – mastering

== Release history ==
Region	Date	Label	Format	Catalog
United Kingdom	1996	Epic	CD	663381
United States	1996	Epic	CD	ESK 8137
