= Robert Roth (musician) =

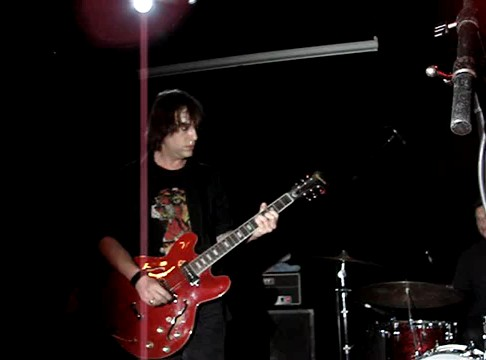
- Robert Roth, frontman of Seattle band Truly

Background information
- Born: Robert Roth
- Origin: Seattle, Washington, United States
- Genres: Grunge, alternative music, psychedelic rock, indie rock
- Occupations: Musician, singer-songwriter
- Instruments: Guitar, vocals, keyboards
- Labels: Sub Pop, Capitol, Pattern 25 Records
- Member of: Truly

Robert Roth (born 1966) is a songwriter, vocalist and guitarist of 1990s Sub Pop and Capitol Records band Truly. The band reunited with all original members to play in shows in Seattle, London and Azkena Rock Festival 2008 alongside Ray Davies, the Sex Pistols, Dinosaur Jr. and the Sonics.

Roth received much international critical acclaim for his 2004 solo debut Someone Somewhere.... Throughout the nineties he had an ongoing collaboration with poet rocker Jim Carroll, resulting in two songs on Carroll's Pools of Mercury and Carroll's EP Runaway. Roth also collaborated on Carroll's Kill Rock Stars in 2000, which coincided with a sold-out show at the Seattle Opera House. Their song "Falling Down Laughing" was added to the soundtrack to the 2008 film Obscene alongside Bob Dylan, the Doors and Patti Smith. Roth also played Mellotron on Built to Spill's Perfect from Now On. Roth is working on the first new Truly record in over ten years as well as new solo material and continues to play live shows with Truly, his solo band as well as alone on acoustic guitar and piano.

== Discography ==
Truly

- Heart and Lungs (EP) – 1991
- Fast Stories... from Kid Coma – 1995
- Feeling You Up – 1997
- Subject to Change: Artists for a Hate-Free America – 1997 compilation
- Twilight Curtains – 2000

Solo

- Someone Somewhere... – 2004

== Sources ==
- Robert Roth Official Web Page, "SHOWS" and "PRESS / Printable bio"
- Robert Roth at My Space, "SHORT BIO..."
- Robert Roth at Discogs, "Releases:" and "Appears On:"
