= Hammerbox (album) =

Studio album by Hammerbox
- Released: 1991
- Recorded: December 1–2, 1990 (tracks 1–8); March 29th, 1990 (tracks 9 and 10)
- Studio: Robert Lang (Shoreline, Washington); Reciprocal (Seattle, Washington)
- Genre: Grunge, alternative rock
- Length: 36:24
- Label: C/Z
- Producer: Hammerbox and Ed Brooks; assistant producer: Steve Manning

Hammerbox chronology
Hammerbox (1991)	Numb (1993)

Professional ratings
Review scores
Source	Rating
Allmusic	3/5 stars

Hammerbox is the debut studio album from Seattle rock band Hammerbox.

== Track listing ==
- All songs written and arranged by Hammerbox.
1. "Bred" – 3:04
2. "Size of the World" – 3:20
3. "When 3 Is 2" – 4:08
4. "We" – 2:32
5. "Ask Why" – 3:39
6. "Under the Moon" – 3:56
7. "Texas Ain't So Bad, Really" – 1:57
8. "Their Given Voice" – 4:14
9. "Woke Up" – 5:24
10. "Kept House" – 4:06

== Personnel ==
- Carrie Akre: Vocals, Tambourine
- Harris Thurmond: Guitars, Vocals
- James Atkins: Bass
- Dave Bosch: Drums, Percussion, Vocals

== Production ==
- Produced by Hammerbox and Ed Brooks; assistant producer: Steve Manning
- Tracks 1–8 recorded and mixed by Ed Brooks; with assistance by Sam Hoftstedt
- Tracks 9–10 recorded by Rich Hinklin; remixed by Ed Brooks
- All songs published by Hammerbox Music.
