= Nearly Lost You =

- Cover from the Sweet Oblivion promotional single

Single by Screaming Trees

from the album Sweet Oblivion and Singles: Original Motion Picture Soundtrack
- Released: August 1992
- Recorded: March 1992
- Studio: Baby Monster and Sear Sound, New York City
- Genre: Grunge; hard rock; alternative rock
- Length: 4:06
- Label: Epic
- Songwriters: Mark Lanegan, Gary Lee Conner, Van Conner
- Producer: Don Fleming

Screaming Trees singles chronology
"Something About Today" (1991)	"Nearly Lost You" (1992)	"Dollar Bill" (1993)

Music video
- "Nearly Lost You" on YouTube

"Nearly Lost You" is a song by the American alternative rock group Screaming Trees. It was the first single released in support of their sixth album, Sweet Oblivion. Perhaps their best-known song, it was a moderate success on modern rock radio, partly because of its appearance on the soundtrack to the 1992 Cameron Crowe film Singles.

== Music video ==
The music video was filmed at the Ellensburg Rodeo in Ellensburg, Washington.

== Formats and track listing ==
UK 12" single (659179 6)

1. "Nearly Lost You" (Gary Lee Conner, Van Conner, Mark Lanegan) – 4:06
2. "E.S.K." (Gary Lee Conner, Mark Lanegan) – 4:09
3. "Song of a Baker" (Small Faces cover) (Ronnie Lane, Steve Marriott) – 3:41
4. "Bed of Roses" (Gary Lee Conner, Van Conner, Mark Lanegan) – 3:02

US 7" single (659179 7)

1. "Nearly Lost You" (edit) (Gary Lee Conner, Van Conner, Mark Lanegan) – 3:40
2. "Nearly Lost You" (Gary Lee Conner, Van Conner, Mark Lanegan) – 4:06

US CD single (658918 2)

1. "Nearly Lost You" (Gary Lee Conner, Van Conner, Mark Lanegan) – 4:06
2. "E.S.K." (Gary Lee Conner, Mark Lanegan) – 4:09
3. "Song of a Baker" (Small Faces cover) (Ronnie Lane, Steve Marriott) – 3:41

== Charts ==
Chart (1992–93)	Peak position
Australia (ARIA)	96
Australia Alternative (ARIA)	7
UK Singles (Official Charts)	50
US Mainstream Rock (Billboard)	12
US Alternative Airplay (Billboard)	5

== Personnel ==
Adapted from the Nearly Lost You liner notes.

Screaming Trees

- Gary Lee Conner – guitar
- Van Conner – bass guitar
- Mark Lanegan – lead vocals
- Barrett Martin – drums

Production and additional personnel

- John Agnello – recording
- Don Fleming – production
- Andy Wallace – mixing
- Howie Weinberg – mastering

== Release history ==
Region	Date	Label	Format	Catalog
United Kingdom	1992	Epic	CD, LP	658237
United States	1992	Epic	CD	ESK 4604

== Use in media ==
The song appears on the soundtrack to the 2007 baseball video game The Bigs and is available as downloadable content for the Rock Band series. It is also featured in the main soundtrack of Guitar Hero 5.

The song appears in season six, episode seven of the American sitcom television series Young Sheldon.

The song also appears in season three, episode four of the American action crime television series Reacher, titled 'Dominique'."
