= Numb (Hammerbox album) =

Studio album by Hammerbox
- Released: 1993
- Genre: Alternative rock, grunge-pop
- Length: 41:59
- Label: A&M
- Producer: Michael Beinhorn

Hammerbox chronology
Hammerbox (1991)	Numb (1993)	Live EMP Skychurch, Seattle, WA (2005)

Numb is the second and final studio album by the American band Hammerbox. It was released in 1993 on A&M Records. The first single was "Hole".

The band supported the album by touring with King Missile and Sloan, among others. The stress of being on a major label led in part to the band's breakup, as did A&M's inability to promote the album.

== Production ==
The album was produced by Michael Beinhorn. Although signed to a major label, the band tried to make the album sound more raw than its independent debut.

== Critical reception ==
Professional ratings
Review scores
Source	Rating
AllMusic	3/5 stars

Spin wrote that the album's "high-impact, tuneful noise expands on the earlier album's promise, refining the songcraft without sacrificing any of its nervy edge." The Record considered it "for Seattle completists only," writing that Hammerbox "don't manage to imbue the already-tired genre with much personality of their own."

The Los Angeles Times noted that "Carrie Akre's trained, Pat Benatar-like vocals seemed predictable in the context of the rough-and-tumble, high-speed music." The Pittsburgh Post-Gazette likened the sound of Numb to "the Indigo Girls trapped in Kurt Cobain's body." Similarly, The Oregonian compared Hammerbox to "Melissa Etheridge fronting Nirvana," writing that "the band has precious few songs with sufficient structural clarity, melodies or even distinctive riffs."

== Track listing ==
1. "Hole" – 2:39
2. "Hed" – 3:17
3. "No" – 4:13
4. "Blur" – 3:07
5. "Outside" – 3:30
6. "When 3 Is 2" – 4:26
7. "Trip" – 3:27
8. "Attack of the Slime Creatures" – 3:46
9. "God" – 3:56
10. "Simple Passing" – 2:01
11. "Sleep" – 4:33
12. "Anywhere But Here"– 3:04

== Personnel ==
- Carrie Akre - vocals
- James Atkins - bass
- Michael Beinhorn - producer
- Dave Bosch - drums, backing vocals
- Paul McKenna - engineering, mixing
- Harris Thurmond - guitar
- Howie Weinberg - mastering
