= Bed of Roses (Screaming Trees song) =

Single by Screaming Trees

from the album Uncle Anesthesia
- Released: 1991
- Recorded: June 1990
- Studio: London Bridge Studio
- Venue: Seattle, WA
- Genre: Grunge, alternative rock, neo-psychedelia
- Length: 3:35
- Label: Epic
- Songwriters: Gary Lee Conner, Van Conner, Mark Lanegan
- Producers: Chris Cornell, Terry Date, Screaming Trees

Screaming Trees singles chronology
"Bed of Roses" (1991)	"Something About Today" (1991)

"Bed of Roses" is a song by the American alternative-rock group Screaming Trees. It is the first single released in support of their fifth album, Uncle Anesthesia. The song made number thirty-two on John Sellers' "The 100 Most Underrated Indie Rock Songs" list.

== Formats and track listing ==
All songs written by Gary Lee Conner, Van Conner and Mark Lanegan.

US CD single (ESK 2296)

1. "Bed of Roses" – 3:35

== Charts ==
Chart (1991)	Peak position
US Mainstream Rock (Billboard)	23

== Personnel ==
Adapted from the Bed of Roses liner notes.

Screaming Trees

- Gary Lee Conner – electric guitar, backing vocals
- Van Conner – bass guitar, backing vocals
- Mark Lanegan – lead vocals
- Mark Pickerel – drums, percussion

Production and additional personnel

- Chris Cornell – production
- Terry Date – production, engineering, percussion
- Joe Gastwirt – mastering
- Screaming Trees – production

== Release history ==
Region	Date	Label	Format	Catalog
United States	1991	Epic	CD, LP	ESK 2296
