= Snake in the Radio =

These Are the New Good Times

Studio album by Mark Pickerel
- Released: May 9, 2006
- Recorded: September 2004 – November 2005
- Genre: Indie rock, Americana
- Length: 45:50
- Label: Bloodshot Records
- Producer: Steve Fisk

Professional ratings
Review scores
Source	Rating
AllMusic	3.5/5 stars

Snake in the Radio is the first album by Mark Pickerel and His Praying Hands. It was released in 2006 by Bloodshot Records.

== Production ==
The album was recorded between September 2004 and November 2005.

== Critical reception ==
AllMusic wrote: "Pickerel's voice has the shaky intensity of an unholy combination of Roy Orbison and Chris Isaak, while the ramshackle production, overseen by grunge legend Steve Fisk, provides an appropriately unsettling musical backdrop." The Riverfront Times wrote that "if you need a soundtrack for savoring that late-night, as-yet-indefinite pensive mood, this is just the thing." PopMatters wrote: "Call it maturity, wanderlust, the need to maintain artistic relevance, or the realization that much of grunge was roots rock with more guitar distortion, but this Americana-by-way-of-Seattle storyline (for lack of a better description) has been an enjoyable development." Seattle Weekly wrote the songs "could be the soundtrack to a David Lynch flick set in a Bakersfield honky tonk."

== Track listing ==
1. "Forest Fire" (5:11)
2. "Come Home Blues" (3:48)
3. "A Town Too Fast for Your Blues" (2:34)
4. "I'll Wait" (5:48)
5. "Graffiti Girl" (3:54)
6. "Ask the Wind, Ask the Dusk" (4:00)
7. "Don't Look Back" (4:04)
8. "You'll Be Mine" (3:34)
9. "Sin Tax Dance" (2:57)
10. "Snake in the Radio" (4:51)
11. "Town Without the Blues" (5:09)

== Personnel ==
- Neko Case - artwork
- Steve Fisk - keyboards
- Jim Sangster - bass
- Johnny Sangster - guitar
