= Twilight Curtains =

Compilation album by Truly
- Released: May 22, 2000
- Recorded: 1991–1997
- Genre: Alternative rock, psychedelic rock, grunge
- Length: 41:09
- Label: Cargo-Headhunter U.K. /Sweet Nothing

Truly chronology
Feeling You Up (1997)	Twilight Curtains (2000)

Professional ratings
Review scores
Source	Rating
AllMusic	3.5/5 stars

Twilight Curtains is a rarities compilation album by Truly. It was released only in the UK, on May 22, 2000. "Twilight Curtains (Single Version)", "Leatherette Tears II", "Girl Don't Tell Me You'll Write", "Queen of the Girls", "10th Century Voluntary Slaves", and "Mellotronica Symphonica" were all previously unreleased up until their appearance on Twilight Curtains.

== Track listing ==
No.	Title	Notes	Length
1.	"Twilight Curtains (Single Version)"	Single version of the original song from Feeling You Up (2000)	4:41
2.	"Leatherette Tears II"	Alternate version of the original song from Feeling You Up (1995)	3:31
3.	"Aliens on Alcohol"	Vinyl-exclusive track on Fast Stories... from Kid Coma (1994)	4:51
4.	"Wait Til' the Night (LP Version)"	Vinyl-exclusive version of the original song from Feeling You Up (1997)	4:52
5.	"I Hit Ignition"	B-side on the "Leslie's Coughing Up Blood" single (1993)	5:32
6.	"Our Lips Are Sealed"	Cover of a Go-Go's song from the tribute album Unsealed (1999)	2:45
7.	"Girl Don't Tell Me You'll Write"	Cover of a Beach Boys song (1996)	2:30
8.	"Queen of the Girls"	Demo recorded prior to the Heart and Lungs EP (1991)	3:54
9.	"10th Century Voluntary Slaves"	Demo recorded prior to the Feeling You Up album (1996)	5:21
10.	"Mellotronica Symphonica"	Demo recorded prior to the Feeling You Up album (1996)	3:10
Total length:			41:09
