= Hammerbox =

American rock band

- Origin: Seattle, Washington, U.S.
- Genres: Alternative rock, grunge
- Years active: 1990–1994; 2004
- Label: C/Z

Hammerbox was an American alternative rock band from Seattle, Washington. The band formed around 1990 and disbanded in 1994 when lead singer Carrie Akre left the band to form Goodness. AllMusic stated that they were among the only bands from the Seattle grunge scene to have been fronted by a woman. They were known for playing a style of grunge that fused elements of heavy metal, punk rock and new wave.

== History ==
Hammerbox formed around 1990 in Seattle and released their first LP, Hammerbox on independent label C/Z Records. This album earned them the opportunity to sign to a major label, A&M Records, with whom they released their second album. However, despite the band's appearance at rock festival Endfest in Bremerton, Washington to support their album, it did not sell well and the band was dropped by the label. James Atkins left the band in early 1994, and the rest of the members followed suit shortly thereafter. Carrie Akre formed Goodness, while Harris Thurmond went on to form Anodyne (later renamed to Marfa Lights) with That Petrol Emotion singer Steve Mack. Thurmond formed Orbiter in 2000, and later Kingsley in 2003.

Live EMP Skychurch, Seattle, WA, an album containing live material from the band's reunion show, was released in 2005.

Bassist James Atkins died in 2016 from esophageal cancer. He was 49.

== Members ==
- Carrie Akre – vocals
- Harris Thurmond – guitar
- James Atkins (died 2016) – bass
- Dave Birenbaum – drums & additional vocals

== Discography ==
- "Kept House" / "After All" – 7-inch (1990)
- "New Rose", The Damned cover on Another Damned Seattle Compilation, Dashboard Hula Girl Records (1991)
- Hammerbox (1991)
- Numb (1993)
- Live EMP Skychurch, Seattle, WA (2005)

The songs "Trip" and "Simple Passing" from the album Numb are featured in the soundtrack of the video game Road Rash, by Electronic Arts, in its 32-bit versions (3DO, PlayStation, Sega Saturn, and Windows 9X).
