= Klay, Liberia =

Town in Bomi County, Liberia

- Location in Liberia
- Coordinates: 6°41′50″N 10°52′35″W
- Country: Liberia
- County: Bomi County

Klay (Kle or Clay) is a town in Bomi County, Liberia, located about 35 km (22 mi) to the north of the nation's capital city of Monrovia. In 2002, this town was attacked by LURD rebels, causing refugees to flee south and leave the town deserted.

== See also ==
- Railway stations in Liberia
