= Live EMP Skychurch, Seattle, WA =

Live album by Hammerbox
- Released: 4 January 2005
- Recorded: 14 May 2004
- Genre: Grunge, alternative rock
- Label: Kufala

Hammerbox chronology
| Numb (1993) | Live EMP Skychurch, Seattle, WA (2005) |

Live EMP Skychurch, Seattle, WA is the first (and only) live album by Hammerbox.

== Track listing ==
1. "Ask Why" – 4:05
2. "Texas Ain't So Bad, Really" – 2:08
3. "Hed" – 3:48
4. "Starring Matter" – 2:35
5. "Simple Passing" – 2:29
6. "Bred" – 3:46
7. "Their Given Voice" – 5:00
8. "Under the Moon" – 4:30
9. "No" – 4:03
10. "Promise to Never" – 1:58
11. "Size of the World" – 3:34
12. "Blur" – 4:04
13. "When 3 Is 2" – 6:57
14. "Woke Up" – 5:05
15. "Hole" – 2:57
16. "Anywhere But Here" – 3:58
