= Fast Stories...from Kid Coma =

Album by Truly

Studio album by Truly
- Released: June 20, 1995
- Recorded: 1992–1994
- Studio: Avast!; Bad Animals; Isolation; The Ranch; Robert Lang (Seattle); Magic Shop (New York City)
- Genre: Grunge; hard rock; psychedelic rock
- Length: 71:43
- Label: Revolution; Capitol; Sub Pop
- Producer: Adam Kasper; John Agnello; Jon Auer; Truly

Truly chronology
Heart and Lungs (1991)	Fast Stories...from Kid Coma (1995)	Feeling You Up (1997)

Singles from Fast Stories...from Kid Coma
- 1. "Blue Flame Ford" Released: 1995

Fast Stories...from Kid Coma is the debut studio album by the American rock band Truly, released in 1995 through Capitol Records imprint Revolution. The vinyl edition was handled by Sub Pop. Truly later released a 2020 remaster of the album on their Bandcamp page with the track "Aliens on Alcohol" being restored to the track listing.

== Concept ==
Fast Stories...from Kid Coma is loosely a concept album, about a comatose kid "reliving a past summer of grandeur."

== Release and reception ==
Professional ratings
Review scores
Source	Rating
AllMusic	4.5/5 stars
Drowned in Sound	9/10
The Encyclopedia of Popular Music	3/5 stars
Kerrang!	5/5 stars

Fast Stories...from Kid Coma was released in the United States through Capitol/Revolution on June 20, 1995. The album was released in Europe by Parlophone Records in February 1996, following criticism from Kerrang! over its lack of availability in the UK in November 1995.

The Las Vegas Review-Journal wrote that the album "mixes hard rock with the atmospheric early '70s psychedelia of Pink Floyd." MTV called it "the great psychedelic hard rock rush of the year." Trouser Press wrote: "Heavy but never bludgeoning, melodic but never cheesy, excessive but never ridiculous, Fast Stories is an extended trip into several of rock’s outer dimensions."

The Encyclopedia of Popular Music called the album "a hard-hitting, insistent record that occasionally overreached in its attempts to distance itself from its contemporaries." Loudwire ranked the album at twenty-sixth in their list of "The 30 Best Grunge Albums of All Time". Kerrang! wrote that Fast Stories...from Kid Coma "remains a genuinely vital album, and quite possibly the [grunge] genre’s swan song." Louder Sound named the album in their list of "10 obscure but absolutely essential grunge albums".

== Track listing ==
1. "Blue Flame Ford" - 6:18
2. "Four Girls" - 4:28
3. "If You Don't Let It Die" - 3:50
4. "Hot Summer 1991" - 5:55
5. "Blue Lights" - 4:12
6. "Leslie's Coughing Up Blood" - 3:41
7. "Hurricane Dance" - 8:10
8. "Angelhead" - 4:47
9. "Tragic Telepathic (Soul Slasher)" - 3:34
10. "Virtually" - 4:48
11. "So Strange" - 5:06
12. "Strangling" - 5:33
13. "Chlorine" - 11:27

== 12″ vinyl track listing / Fast Stories... from Kid Coma (2020 Remaster) track listing ==
1. "Blue Flame Ford" - 6:18
2. "Four Girls" - 4:28
3. "If You Don't Let It Die" - 3:50
4. "Hot Summer 1991" - 5:55
5. "Blue Lights" - 4:12
6. "Leslie's Coughing Up Blood" - 3:41
7. "Hurricane Dance" - 8:10
8. "Angelhead" - 4:47
9. "Tragic Telepathic (Soul Slasher)" - 3:34
10. "Aliens on Alcohol" - 4:51
11. "Virtually" - 4:48
12. "So Strange" - 5:06
13. "Strangling" - 5:33
14. "Chlorine" - 11:27

== Personnel ==
Truly

- Mark Pickerel - drums
- Robert Roth - vocals, guitar
- Hiro Yamamoto - bass guitar

Additional personnel

- Eamon Nordquist - guitar (tracks 11, 12, & 13)

Production

- John Agnello - producer, mixing (tracks 1, 2, 9, & 11)
- Jon Auer - producer (track 7)
- Greg Calbi - mastering
- Jon Dunleavy, Edward Douglas - engineering
- Adam Kasper- producer, mixing (tracks 3, 5, 6, 8, 12, & 13)
- Erin Kenny - recording
