= Uncle Anesthesia =

- Original album artwork by Mark Ryden

Studio album by Screaming Trees
- Released: January 29, 1991
- Recorded: June 1990
- Studio: London Bridge, Seattle, Washington
- Genre: Psychedelic rock
- Length: 47:05
- Label: Epic
- Producer: Terry Date, Chris Cornell

Screaming Trees chronology
Something About Today (1990)	Uncle Anesthesia (1991)	Anthology: SST Years 1985-1989 (1991)

Singles from Uncle Anesthesia
- 1. "Bed of Roses" Released: 1991

Uncle Anesthesia is the fifth studio album by the American band Screaming Trees. It was released in 1991 via Epic Records. It includes three of the four tracks from the band's previous Epic release, Something About Today.

"Bed of Roses" was released as a single and peaked at No. 23 on the Modern Rock charts. The band supported the album with a North American tour that included shows with Nirvana and Das Damen; Dan Peters played drums on much of the tour.

== Production ==
Recorded at London Bridge Studio, Uncle Anesthesia was produced primarily by Terry Date and Soundgarden vocalist Chris Cornell. Unlike in the past, the band rehearsed for a couple of weeks before recording. The album took six and a half weeks to record.

Uncle Anesthesia was the last to feature drumming by original member Mark Pickerel, who left on amicable terms in 1991. He was replaced by Barrett Martin.

== Critical reception ==
Professional ratings
Review scores
Source	Rating
AllMusic	3/5 stars
Calgary Herald	B−
(The New) Rolling Stone Album Guide	3/5 stars
Spin Alternative Record Guide	7/10

The Calgary Herald noted the "strong rockin' guitars with psychedelic undercurrents and the occasional pause for the pensive cause." The St. Petersburg Times wrote that "vocalist Mark Lanegan croons fairy tale lyrics that melt through a sonic wall of guitars and percussion." The Dayton Daily News concluded that "if Jim Morrison had joined a garage band instead of the jazz-trained Doors, it might have sounding something like Screaming Trees."

The Province opined that "Gary Lee Conner resurrects the guitar sound of Syd Barrett and takes the band toward Interstellar Overdrive." The Washington Post determined that "Gary Lee Conner can tear off a screeching lead or stomp a wah-wah pedal like any halfway-initiated Black Sabbath disciple, but he's not merely a piledriver; his atmospheric playing on tracks like 'Bed of Roses' give them unexpected delicacy." The San Diego Union-Tribune stated that "Lanegan's spooky, back-from-the-crypt vocals and Gary Lee Conner's luminous guitars give this album an otherworldly glow."

== Track listing ==
All tracks are written by Mark Lanegan and Gary Lee Conner, except where noted.

Uncle Anesthesia track listing
No.	Title	Writer(s)	Length
1.	"Beyond This Horizon"		4:13
2.	"Bed of Roses"	Lanegan, G. Conner, Van Conner	3:02
3.	"Uncle Anesthesia"	Lanegan, G. Conner, V. Conner	3:52
4.	"Story of Her Fate"		1:41
5.	"Caught Between"	Lanegan, G. Conner, V. Conner	5:03
6.	"Lay Your Head Down"		3:32
7.	"Before We Arise"		2:26
8.	"Something About Today"		3:02
9.	"Alice Said"		4:11
10.	"Time for Light"		3:50
11.	"Disappearing"		3:12
12.	"Ocean of Confusion"		3:05
13.	"Closer"		5:48
Total length:			47:05

== Personnel ==
Screaming Trees

- Mark Lanegan – vocals
- Gary Lee Conner – guitar, backing vocals
- Van Conner – bass, backing vocals
- Mark Pickerel – drums, percussion on "Bed of Roses"

Additional personnel

- Terry Date – producer, engineer, backing vocals on "Alice Said"
- Chris Cornell – producer, backing vocals on "Alice Said," "Uncle Anesthesia," and "Before We Arise", recorder on "Lay Your Head Down"
- Screaming Trees – producer
- Scott Miller – backing vocals on "Alice Said"
- Terry Pickerel – percussion on "Bed of Roses"
- Jeff McGraph – trumpet on "Disappearing"
- David Coleman – art direction
- Karen Mason – photography
- Mark Ryden – artwork

== Charts ==
Singles - Billboard (North America)

Year	Single	Chart	Position
1991	"Bed of Roses"	Modern Rock Tracks	23
