= Truly (band) =

American rock band

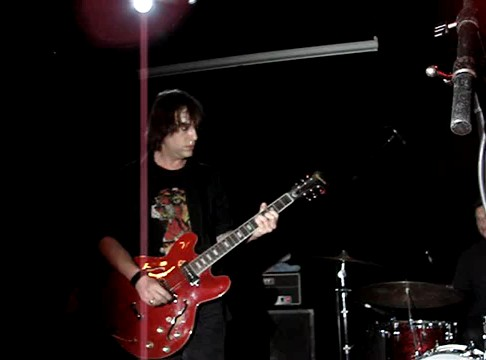
- Robert Roth performing with Truly in 2008

Background information
- Origin: Seattle, Washington, U.S.
- Genres: Grunge, psychedelic rock, alternative rock
- Years active: 1990–1998, 2000, 2008–present
- Labels: Sub Pop, Capitol, Thick, Flotation
- Members: Robert Roth; Mark Pickerel; Hiro Yamamoto
- Past members: Chris Quinn

Truly is an American rock band formed in the wake of the grunge era. It featured singer-guitarist Robert Roth, bassist Hiro Yamamoto, and drummer Mark Pickerel. Yamamoto and Pickerel were founding members respectively of Soundgarden and Screaming Trees. While not a commercially successful group like some of their Seattle contemporaries, the band lasted a decade with two studio albums to their name.

== History ==
=== Background, formation, and Heart and Lungs (1990–1992) ===
Following the demise of his previous band The Storybook Krooks, Robert Roth auditioned to play guitar for Nirvana but they ultimately decided to continue as a trio. A month later, Roth says he met up with Pickerel as he (Roth) was beginning to write new songs for what would become his signature venture:

"At that point, I was just going to go in and record a solo record, and Mark ended up quitting the Screaming Trees that week. The guy who was playing bass at the time, Chris Quinn, quit his band that day. So once we got to the studio, we realized, 'Oh "we're a band".' I already had a song called "Truly." Chris said, 'How about calling the band Truly?' Mark was at work, and Jonathan Poneman said, 'Why don't you call your band Truly?' Two different people came up with the same name – I figured that was fate."

After Pickerel joined, Roth claims that Quinn (who was initially the guitarist in SGM) insisted on switching to guitar, which led to an opening for a bass player. Pickerel then contacted Yamamoto, who reflects:

"I was out of music for a while – I just didn't want to play. I was pretty tired of it. Mark called me, and said, 'I'm playing with this guy, and we're looking for a bass player.' I was like, 'OK, I'll give it a shot.' I hadn't played for a couple of years. I listened to their stuff, and was like, 'This is kinda cool.'"

Truly released their debut EP, Heart and Lungs, through Sub Pop in 1991. This is the only recording that the band did as a quartet as Chris Quinn left shortly thereafter. Roth later commented that he and Quinn did not get along that well, saying, "I'm more of an intuitive type, he's more a studied type." Truly also played on the side stage at Lollapalooza in 1992.

=== Fast Stories...from Kid Coma and Feeling You Up (1993–2000) ===
In 1993, Truly signed on to Capitol Records and two years later released their critically acclaimed album Fast Stories...from Kid Coma. Steve Kurutz of AllMusic gave the album four and a half stars, calling it "a loosely based concept album filled with overdriven guitar and the soothing yet slightly menacing voice of singer Robert Roth." The track "Hot Summer 1991" is also featured on the compilation album Subject to Change: Artists for a Hate-Free America'. Robert Roth has deemed Fast Stories…from Kid Coma his favorite, saying:

"I really feel it's an album, in the sense that we weren't just putting together a collection of songs. In our heads, it was like a movie we were making. By the time we made that record, they said things like, 'Push the envelope – do what you want to do,' and 'Don't worry about singles, don't worry about hits until the third or fourth record. We want you to be an album band like Pink Floyd or Zeppelin. We're like, 'Are you sure?'"

Hiro Yamamoto commented on the album:

"Some of the songs and lyrics [on Fast Stories] still put a chill down my spine when I hear them. Certain parts of songs just have this feel, and to me, that's the reason why I always played music – to make that kind of sound."

Roth claims he later edited a single version of the album's opening track "Blue Flame Ford" so that Stories would get more exposure but instead the band was sent back to the studio to begin working on their next album, Feeling You Up. At this point, the band became fed up by the lack of support they were getting from Capitol Records. They switched to a smaller, independent label called Thick Records and released Feeling You Up in 1997. Greg Prato of AllMusic gave Feeling You Up four stars, calling it "an incredibly solid album, which easily could have fit into MTV and rock radio play lists at the time, if both outlets weren't so obsessed with Limp Bizkit and Everclear." The band toured briefly in support of Feeling You Up in the U.S. but had to cancel halfway through as Roth said Pickerel had some personal issues to take care of and the band broke up shortly afterward.

=== Twilight Curtains and post-Truly (2000-present) ===
The band's final release, Twilight Curtains , a mixture of new and unreleased songs and demos, was released in Europe in 2000 through the independent label, Cargo/Headhunter UK "While it's expectedly not on par with their woefully overlooked 1995 masterpiece, Fast Stories from Kid Coma," writes Greg Prato, "Twilight Curtains is still highly recommended to longtime fans."

In 2004, Robert Roth released his solo album Someone Somewhere....

In 2008, the band began touring and were said to be working on another album. In October 2013, the band premiered their new single titled "Wheels on Fire".

In 2014, Fast Stories...from Kid Coma came in at No. 3 on a "Top 10 Underrated 90s Alternative Rock Albums" list at the Alternative Nation website.

== Influences ==
Truly cited influences including Black Sabbath, the Stooges, the Wipers, the Gun Club, Echo & the Bunnymen, Kid Coma, the Church, Kiss, the Rolling Stones, the Who, the Beach Boys, Earth, Wind & Fire, the Supremes, Marvin Gaye, Television, the Clash, the Sex Pistols, the Ramones, Neil Young, John Coltrane and Miles Davis.

== Discography ==
Studio albums and EPs

Year	Album details
1991	Heart and Lungs: Released: October 18, 1991; Label: Sub Pop
1995	Fast Stories...from Kid Coma: Released: June 20, 1995; Label: Capitol Records
1997	Feeling You Up: Released: October 14, 1997; Thick Records
2000	Twilight Curtains: Released: May 22, 2000; Label: Cargo-Headhunter U.K./Sweet Nothing

Singles

Year	Single details
2018	Wheels On Fire: Released: May 3, 2018; Label: Flotation Records

Other appearances

Year	Song	Title	Label
1997	"Hot Summer 1991"	Subject to Change: Artists for a Hate-Free America	Airforce Records
