= Sweet Oblivion =

Studio album by Screaming Trees
- Released: September 8, 1992
- Recorded: March 1992
- Genres: Grunge; psychedelic rock; folk rock
- Length: 46:13
- Label: Epic
- Producer: Don Fleming

Screaming Trees chronology
| Anthology: SST Years 1985–1989 (1991) | Sweet Oblivion (1992) | Winter Songs Tour Tracks (1992) |

Singles from Sweet Oblivion
- 1. "Nearly Lost You" Released: August 1992; 2. "Dollar Bill" Released: March 7, 1993; 3. "Shadow of the Season" Released: 1993; 4. "Butterfly" Released: 1993

Sweet Oblivion is the sixth studio album by Screaming Trees, released on September 8, 1992. It quickly became the band's best-selling record, and was the closest they ever came to achieving mainstream success. Sweet Oblivion sold in excess of 300,000 copies on the strength of the band's biggest hit, "Nearly Lost You". The song benefited from an appearance on Singles: Original Motion Picture Soundtrack, a Top Ten, platinum-selling hit album which featured many other popular Seattle-based music acts from the period.

Around the time of the recording of the album, the band’s original drummer Mark Pickerel left to pursue other musical interests, and was replaced with Barrett Martin.

Nearly four years passed in between Sweet Oblivion and the band's follow-up album, Dust, a move that hurt much of the band's commercial momentum.

Professional ratings
Review scores
| Source | Rating |
|---|---|
| AllMusic | 4/5 stars |
| Entertainment Weekly | B+ |
| Kerrang! | 4/5 |
| Los Angeles Times | 3/4 stars |
| NME | 8/10 |
| Q | 4/5 stars |
| The Rolling Stone Album Guide | 3/5 stars |
| Select | 5/5 |
| Spin Alternative Record Guide | 9/10 |
| The Village Voice | B+ |

== Track listing ==
| No. | Title | Writer(s) | Length |
|---|---|---|---|
| 1. | "Shadow of the Season" | L. Conner, Lanegan | 4:32 |
| 2. | "Nearly Lost You" | L. Conner, V. Conner, Lanegan | 4:06 |
| 3. | "Dollar Bill" | V. Conner, Lanegan | 4:35 |
| 4. | "More or Less" | L. Conner, V. Conner, Lanegan | 3:13 |
| 5. | "Butterfly" | L. Conner, V. Conner, Lanegan | 3:21 |
| 6. | "For Celebrations Past" | L. Conner, V. Conner, Lanegan, Martin | 4:10 |
| 7. | "The Secret Kind" | L. Conner, V. Conner, Lanegan, Martin | 3:09 |
| 8. | "Winter Song" | L. Conner, Lanegan | 3:43 |
| 9. | "Troubled Times" | L. Conner, V. Conner, Lanegan, Martin | 5:21 |
| 10. | "No One Knows" | L. Conner, Lanegan | 5:13 |
| 11. | "Julie Paradise" | V. Conner, Lanegan | 5:05 |

== Personnel ==
Screaming Trees

- Mark Lanegan – vocals
- Gary Lee Conner – guitar
- Van Conner – bass
- Barrett Martin – drums

Technical

- Don Fleming – production
- Andy Wallace – mixing
- Howie Weinberg – mastering
- John Agnello – engineering

Visual

- David Coleman – art direction
- Michael Lavine – photography

== Charts ==
1993 chart performance for Sweet Oblivion
| Chart (1993) | Peak position |
|---|---|
| Australian Albums (ARIA) | 77 |
| US Billboard 200 | 141 |
| US Heatseekers Albums (Billboard) | 4 |

2025 chart performance for Sweet Oblivion
| Chart (2025) | Peak position |
|---|---|
| Greek Albums (IFPI) | 31 |
