= Dollar Bill (Screaming Trees song) =

1993 single by Screaming Trees

Single by Screaming Trees

from the album Sweet Oblivion
- B-side: "(There'll Be) Peace in the Valley (for Me)"
- Released: March 7, 1993
- Recorded: March 1992
- Studio: Baby Monster and Sear Sound, New York City
- Genre: Grunge; folk; Americana
- Length: 4:35
- Label: Epic
- Songwriters: Van Conner, Mark Lanegan
- Producer: Don Fleming

Screaming Trees singles chronology
"Nearly Lost You" (1992)	"Dollar Bill" (1993)	"Shadow of the Season" (1993)

"Dollar Bill" is a song by the American alternative rock group Screaming Trees. It is the second single released in support of their sixth album, Sweet Oblivion.

== Formats and track listing ==
UK 12" single (659179 6)

1. "Dollar Bill" (Van Conner, Mark Lanegan) – 4:33
2. "(There'll Be) Peace in the Valley (For Me)" (Thomas A. Dorsey) – 2:48
3. "Tomorrow's Dream" (Geezer Butler, Tony Iommi, Ozzy Osbourne, Bill Ward) – 4:14

UK 7" single (659179 7)

1. "Dollar Bill" (Van Conner, Mark Lanegan) – 4:33
2. "(There'll Be) Peace in the Valley (For Me)" (Thomas A. Dorsey) – 2:48

UK CD single (658918 2)

1. "Dollar Bill" (Van Conner, Mark Lanegan) – 4:35
2. "(There'll Be) Peace in the Valley (For Me)" (Thomas A. Dorsey) – 2:51
3. "Winter Song" (Mark Lanegan) – 3:52
4. "Tomorrow's Dream" (Geezer Butler, Tony Iommi, Ozzy Osbourne, Bill Ward) – 4:12

== Charts ==
Chart (1993–1995)	Peak position
Australia (ARIA)	119
UK Singles (Official Charts)	52
US Mainstream Rock (Billboard)	40
US Alternative Airplay (Billboard)	28

== Personnel ==
Adapted from the Dollar Bill liner notes.

Screaming Trees

- Gary Lee Conner – guitar
- Van Conner – bass guitar
- Mark Lanegan – lead vocals
- Barrett Martin – drums

Production and additional personnel

- John Agnello – recording
- Don Fleming – production
- Andy Wallace – mixing
- Howie Weinberg – mastering

== Release history ==
Region	Date	Label	Format	Catalog
United Kingdom	1993	Epic	CD, LP	658918
United States	1993	Epic	CD	ESK 4771
