= Dust (Screaming Trees album) =

Studio album by Screaming Trees
- Released: June 25, 1996
- Recorded: 1995–1996
- Studios: Capitol, Hollywood; Sunset Sound, Hollywood; Hit Factory, New York City
- Genres: Hard rock; psychedelic rock; grunge
- Length: 44:14
- Label: Epic
- Producer: George Drakoulias

Screaming Trees chronology
Winter Songs Tour Tracks (1992)	Dust (1996)	Nearly Lost You (2001)

Singles from Dust
- 1. "All I Know" Released: June 1996; 2. "Sworn and Broken" Released: November 23, 1996

Dust is the seventh studio album by Screaming Trees, released on June 25, 1996.

== Background ==
After an aborted attempt at recording a followup to Sweet Oblivion with producer Don Fleming, the band hired producer George Drakoulias to man the controls for what eventually turned out to be their last album released during the group's lifetime. In contrast to the group's previous recordings that were more influenced by psychedelic rock and punk rock, Dust contains music that is equally influenced by folk and blues, while still retaining a harder-edged sound. "All I Know" was released as a single from the album and became a success on rock radio. "Dying Days" features Pearl Jam guitarist Mike McCready.

== Reception ==
Professional ratings
Review scores
Source	Rating
AllMusic	4/5 stars
Chicago Tribune	3/4 stars
Entertainment Weekly	A
The Guardian	4/5 stars
NME	9/10
Q	3/5 stars
Record Collector	4/5 stars
Rolling Stone	4/5 stars
The Rolling Stone Album Guide	4/5 stars
Spin	7/10

Kerrang! selected Dust as the best album of 1996 in their year-end awards. The band toured behind Dust for nearly two years (with former Kyuss and future Queens of the Stone Age frontman Josh Homme serving as a touring guitarist), and afterwards went on an extended hiatus, eventually disbanding officially in 2000.

== Track listing ==
All songs written by Van Conner, Gary Lee Conner, Mark Lanegan except as indicated.

1. "Halo of Ashes" (V. Conner, G. Conner, Lanegan, Barrett Martin) – 4:04
2. "All I Know" – 3:55
3. "Look at You" – 4:42
4. "Dying Days" – 4:51
5. "Make My Mind" – 4:11
6. "Sworn and Broken" – 3:34
7. "Witness" – 3:39
8. "Traveler" – 5:22
9. "Dime Western" (V. Conner, G. Conner, Lanegan, Martin) – 3:39
10. "Gospel Plow" (V. Conner, G. Conner, Lanegan, Martin) – 6:17

== Personnel ==
Screaming Trees

- Gary Lee Conner – electric & acoustic guitar, electric sitar, backing vocals
- Van Conner – bass, guitars, backing vocals
- Mark Lanegan – vocals, guitar
- Barrett Martin – drums, percussion, congas, tablas, djembe, cello, harmonium

Additional musicians

- George Drakoulias – percussion, producer
- Chris Goss – backing vocals
- Brian Jenkins – backing vocals on "Traveler"
- Mike McCready – guitar solo on "Dying Days"
- Jeff Nolan – guitar on "Dime Western"
- Benmont Tench – Mellotron on "Halo of Ashes", "Traveler", "Dime Western", and "Gospel Plow"; organ, electric piano, and piano on "Dying Days", "Look At You", "All I Know", and "Sworn and Broken"
- 21st Street Singers – backing vocals on "Dying Days"

Additional personnel

- Mark Danielson – front cover artwork
- Danny Clinch – photography

== Charts ==
Chart performance for Dust
Chart (1996)	Peak position
Australian Albums (ARIA)	75
Canadian Albums (RPM)	39
UK Albums (Official Charts)	32
US Billboard 200	134
US Heatseekers Albums (Billboard)	5
