= Heart and Lungs =

EP by Truly
- Released: October 18, 1991
- Recorded: Summer 1990
- Genre: Alternative rock, grunge, psychedelic rock
- Length: 17:05
- Label: Sub Pop
- Producer: Robert Roth, Truly, Jonathan Auer

Truly chronology
Heart and Lungs (1991)	Fast Stories...From Kid Coma (1995)

Professional ratings
Review scores
Source	Rating
Allmusic	3/5 stars

Heart and Lungs is an EP by the American rock band Truly. "Heart and Lungs" was featured in the 1992 film Singles.

== Track listing ==
1. "Heart and Lungs" - 4:20
2. "The Color Is Magic" - 4:26
3. "Truly Drowning" - 4:47
4. "Married in the Playground" - 3:30
