= Mark Pickerel =

American musician (born 1968)

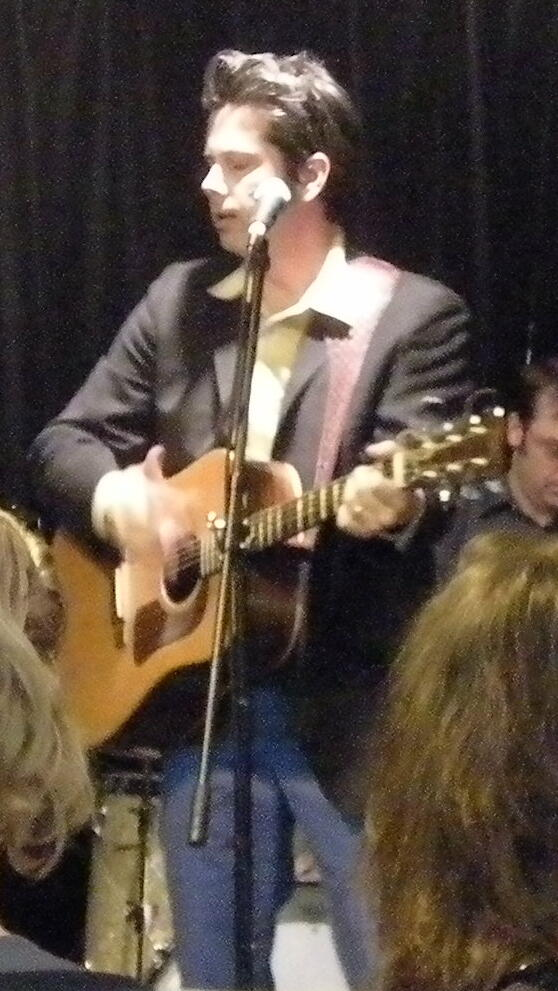
- Pickerel performing with Mark Pickerel and His Praying Hands in Seattle, 2008.

Background information
- Born: March 12, 1968 (age 58)
- Origin: Ellensburg, Washington, U.S.
- Genres: Grunge, alternative rock
- Occupations: Musician, songwriter
- Instruments: Drums, vocals, guitar
- Years active: 1985–present
- Labels: SST, K, Homestead, Sub Pop, Epic, Thick, Up, Bloodshot
- Website: markpickerel.com

Mark Pickerel (born March 12, 1968) is an American musician best known as the original drummer for the alternative rock band Screaming Trees. He is also an active session musician and has released several solo albums as a singer/guitarist.

== Biography ==
Originally from Ellensburg, Washington, Pickerel was a high school acquaintance of Van Conner and Gary Lee Conner, and the three formed the band Explosive Generation with Pickerel on drums and vocals. Several years after graduation, the trio formed Screaming Trees with singer Mark Lanegan in 1985 (by this time Pickerel no longer performed lead vocals). The band soon moved to Seattle to join that city's burgeoning grunge scene. During this period, Pickerel participated in recording sessions with several bands in the Seattle scene; some of these later appeared on Lanegan's solo album The Winding Sheet and on the Nirvana rarities compilation With the Lights Out.

Pickerel played on five studio albums with Screaming Trees, but quit the band in 1991 just before they began recording their breakthrough album Sweet Oblivion. He was replaced by Barrett Martin. Pickerel then formed the band Truly with former Soundgarden bassist Hiro Yamamoto and singer/guitarist Robert Roth. Truly released two studio albums before splitting in 1997.

Pickerel next switched to guitar and vocals and formed the band The Dark Fantastic in 1997; this band released two albums before splitting in 2001. During this period he was also an active session musician, appearing on records by Lanegan, Neko Case, Steve Fisk, Jim Carroll, and Pigeonhed. In 2004 Pickerel formed a singer-songwriter project called Mark Pickerel and His Praying Hands. The 2006 album Snake in the Radio under this name received positive reviews for its eclectic mix of indie rock and Americana elements. The latest album by Mark Pickerel and His Praying Hands, Rebel in the Rearview, was released in 2021.

Pickerel has also owned and operated various record shops, and currently runs RoadTrip Records in Ellensburg.

== Discography ==
Solo

- Snake in the Radio (2006)
- Cody's Dream (2008)
- Tess (2013)
- Rebel in the Rearview (2021)

Brandi Carlile

- Brandi Carlile (2005)

Screaming Trees

- Clairvoyance (1986)
- Even If and Especially When (1987)
- Invisible Lantern (1988)
- Buzz Factory (1989)
- Change Has Come (1990)
- Uncle Anesthesia (1991)

Truly

- Heart and Lungs EP (1991)
- Fast Stories... from Kid Coma (1995)
- Feeling You Up (1997)
- Subject to Change: Artists for a Hate-Free America (1997) compilation
- Twilight Curtains (2000)

The Tripwires

- Makes You Look Around (2008)
- House to House (2009)

The Dark Fantastic

- The Dark Fantastic (1999)
- Goodbye Crooked Scar (2001)

Mark Lanegan

- The Winding Sheet (1990)
- Whiskey for the Holy Ghost (1994)
- I'll Take Care of You (1999)

Nirvana

- With the Lights Out (2004)
- Sliver: The Best of the Box (2005)

Carrie Akre

- ...Last the Evening (2007)
