= Screaming Trees =

American rock band (1984–2000)

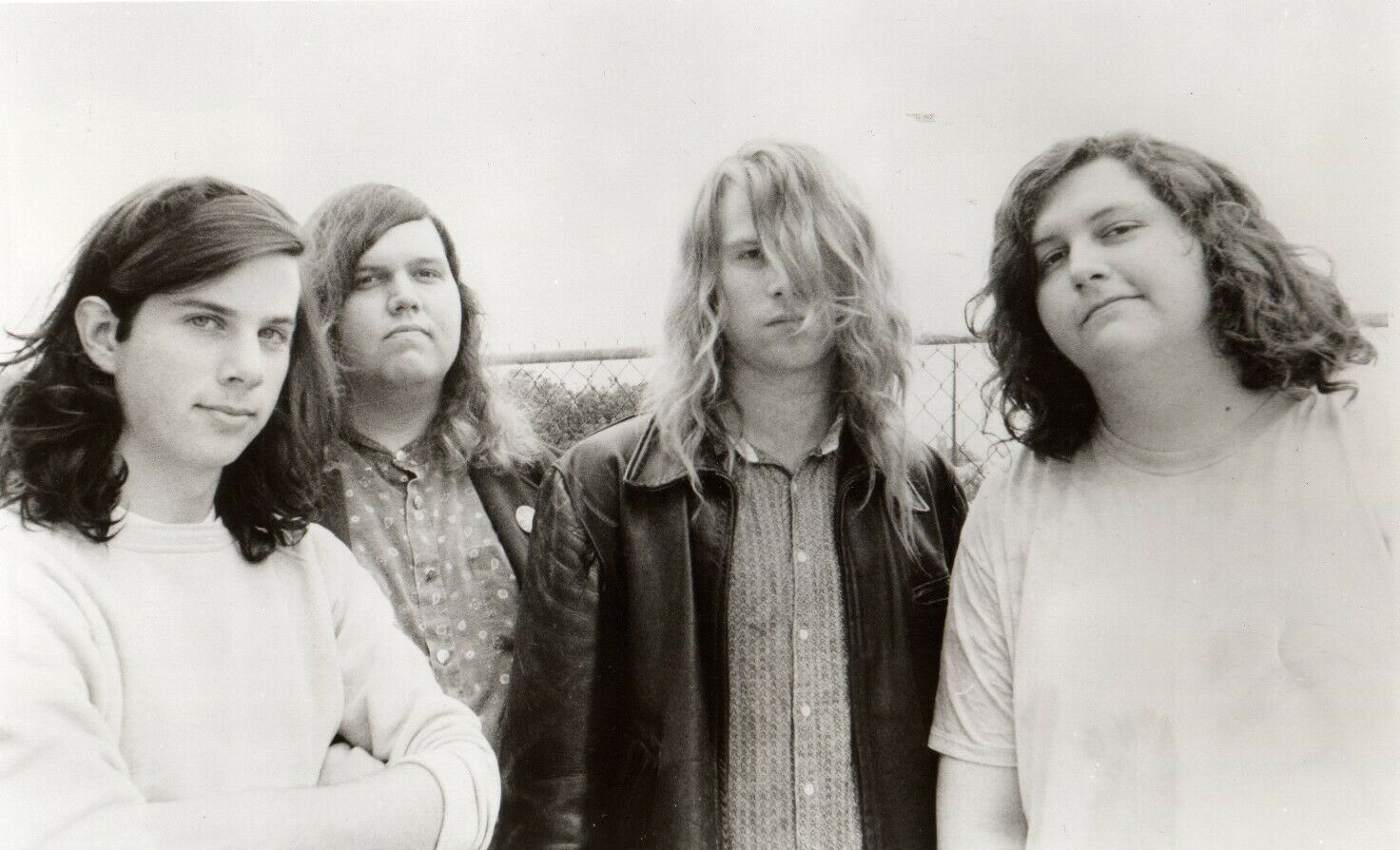
- Screaming Trees in the 1980s. Left to right: Mark Pickerel, Gary Lee Conner, Mark Lanegan, and Van Conner.

Background information
- Origin: Ellensburg, Washington, U.S.
- Genres: Grunge; alternative rock; neo-psychedelia; hard rock; country rock
- Works: Screaming Trees discography
- Years active: 1984–2000
- Labels: K; Velvetone; SST; Sub Pop; Epic; Sunyata
- Spinoffs: Queens of the Stone Age
- Past members: Mark Lanegan; Gary Lee Conner; Van Conner; Mark Pickerel; Barrett Martin; Josh Homme

Screaming Trees were an American rock band formed in Ellensburg, Washington, in 1984 by vocalist Mark Lanegan, guitarist Gary Lee Conner, bassist Van Conner, and drummer Mark Pickerel. Pickerel was replaced by Barrett Martin in 1991. Screaming Trees became known as one of the pioneers of grunge. Although widely associated with grunge, the band's sound incorporated hard rock and psychedelic elements.

After releasing a string of EPs and albums in the 1980s on independent labels, Screaming Trees signed with Epic Records in 1990. They released their major label debut album in 1991, Uncle Anesthesia, which spawned their first charting single "Bed of Roses". After Martin replaced Pickerel on drums, Screaming Trees released their most successful album in 1992, Sweet Oblivion. "Dollar Bill" became a minor radio hit, but the lead single "Nearly Lost You" vastly increased the band's popularity as it peaked at No. 5 on the Modern Rock Tracks Chart, No. 12 on the Mainstream Rock Tracks Chart, No. 50 on the UK Singles Chart, and No. 96 on the ARIA Chart.

After an extended hiatus and various recording sessions, the band's follow-up album was eventually released in 1996, entitled Dust. Although the lead single "All I Know" peaked at No. 9 on both the Modern Rock Tracks and Mainstream Rock Tracks charts, the album did not match its predecessor's success. After difficulties in recording another album, the band announced their official breakup in 2000. Their aborted album from the late 1990s was later released in 2011 as Last Words: The Final Recordings. Lanegan died aged 57 on February 22, 2022. Van Conner died aged 55 on January 17, 2023.

== History ==
=== 1984–1989: Formation and early releases ===
The Conner brothers formed Screaming Trees with Mark Lanegan and Mark Pickerel in 1984 in Ellensburg, Washington, a small town a little over 100 miles from Seattle. The band was drawn together in high school by an interest in punk, garage, and classic rock.

The band rehearsed at the Conner family's video rental store and recorded their demo tape Other Worlds in the summer of 1985 with Steve Fisk at Creative Fire recording studio in Ellensburg. It was initially distributed by the independent label K Records. Other Worlds then got a wider release through the independent label, Velvetone Records (also based out of Ellensburg). In 1986, they released their debut full-length album, Clairvoyance, also on the Velvetone label. Musically, the album combined psychedelic rock and hard rock with the band's aforementioned influences. With Fisk's help, the LP caught the attention of Greg Ginn, and the band were signed to SST Records.

In 1987, the band released their second LP, and their first for SST, Even If and Especially When. After the release of the album in 1987, the band began working the American indie circuit, playing shows across the US with other SST bands such as Firehose and Meat Puppets. In early 1988, Screaming Trees collaborated with the indie pop band Beat Happening on the EP Beat Happening/Screaming Trees. Screaming Trees' next album, Invisible Lantern, was released later on in 1988. SST also decided to re-release Other Worlds that same year. Screaming Trees then released the album Buzz Factory in 1989. While attempting to tour behind Buzz Factory, SST had difficulties in releasing the album. By the tour's conclusion, the band became frustrated and departed from the label.

Towards the end of 1989, Screaming Trees briefly became a part of the roster for the prominent independent label Sub Pop. The label released the band's EP Change Has Come in December 1989. Half of it was produced by Fisk and the other half was produced by Jack Endino. Drummer Pickerel later described the EP, in his own opinion, as "our best recorded moment".

=== 1990–2000: Major label years ===
In 1990 the band signed a major label contract with Epic Records. The band released their fifth full-length album the following year, and first for a major label, Uncle Anesthesia. The album was produced by Terry Date and Soundgarden vocalist Chris Cornell and included the single "Bed of Roses", which gained considerable airtime on alternative rock radio stations and peaked at No. 23 on the Modern Rock Tracks Chart. The single was the first Screaming Trees release to chart. Although Uncle Anesthesia sold better than their previous efforts, the band remained a cult act.

After the release of Uncle Anesthesia Van Conner went on hiatus from the band, choosing to tour as bass player for Dinosaur Jr. instead, with Donna Dresch filling in for him during Screaming Trees performances. Late in 1991, Nirvana's Nevermind became an unexpected commercial success, opening the gates for the rest of the Seattle scene.

Screaming Trees in 1992

Barrett Martin replaced previous drummer Pickerel and the new lineup recorded Sweet Oblivion in 1992. Sweet Oblivion was the band's breakout album and included the hit single "Nearly Lost You". The video for "Nearly Lost You" became an MTV and alternative radio hit in the fall of 1992, thanks to its inclusion in the soundtrack for the film Singles. "Nearly Lost You" peaked at No. 5 on the Modern Rock Tracks Chart, No. 12 on the Mainstream Rock Tracks Chart, No. 96 on the ARIA Chart, and No. 50 on the UK Singles Chart, making it the band's first single to chart outside the United States. "Dollar Bill" was also released as a single and it peaked at No. 28 on the Modern Rock Tracks Chart and at No. 40 on the Mainstream Rock Tracks Chart. Overall, Sweet Oblivion sold a total of 300,000 copies in the United States.

Screaming Trees were chosen by Nirvana band leader Kurt Cobain to appear on the final day of the Reading Festival in the United Kingdom on August 30, 1992, which Nirvana headlined. Screaming Trees also played at the Roskilde Festival in Denmark in 1992 which Nirvana headlined as well. The band supported Sweet Oblivion with a year-long tour, during which tension developed among the members. After the tour was finished, the group took an extended hiatus. During that time, Lanegan recorded his second solo album, Whiskey for the Holy Ghost, which was released in 1994. The following year, Lanegan was featured as a guest vocalist in the Barrett Martin (alongside Layne Staley and Mike McCready) side project Mad Season. Lanegan co-wrote and sang on two songs. Mad Season would only release one studio album because of Staley's deteriorating health and the 1999 death of bassist John Baker Saunders. Mad Season attempted to reform with Lanegan on lead vocals, changing the band's name to "Disinformation", however the project never got off the ground. In 2013 Mad Season released a deluxe version of their debut album, including three songs from the Disinformation sessions with new lyrics and vocals by Lanegan.

In early 1995, Screaming Trees toured Australia for the only time as part of the Big Day Out festival, before beginning work on their follow-up to Sweet Oblivion. Following one stillborn attempt at the album, the band hired producer George Drakoulias, who had previously worked with the Black Crowes and the Jayhawks. The resulting album, Dust, was released in 1996, nearly four years after its predecessor. The album peaked at No. 134 on the Billboard 200 Chart, No. 32 on the UK Albums Chart, and No. 39 on the RPM Top 100 Albums Chart. Dust gained favorable reviews while the singles "Sworn and Broken" peaked at No. 76 on the UK Singles Chart and "All I Know" peaked at No. 9 on both the Modern Rock Tracks and Mainstream Rock Tracks charts; however, the album ultimately did not match the sales of Sweet Oblivion. After the release of the album, Josh Homme, formerly from Kyuss, was hired as rhythm guitarist.

Following the Dust tour in the United States, Screaming Trees took another hiatus for Lanegan to begin his work on his third solo album, Scraps At Midnight, which was released in 1998. The band headed back into the studio in 1999 and recorded several demos including the song "Ash Grey Sunday" and shopped them around to labels, but no label was interested. The band played a few surprise shows in early 2000 to try to gain a label's attention but they were unsuccessful. They did however release the song "One Way Conversation" on the Musicblitz Records internet label. In 2000, after a concert to celebrate the opening of Seattle's Experience Music Project, the band announced their official breakup.

=== Final album and deaths of Lanegan and Van Conner ===
On June 22, 2011, it was announced that an unreleased album that Screaming Trees recorded in 1998 and 1999 would finally see the light of day. Titled Last Words: The Final Recordings, the album was mixed by Jack Endino and Martin. It was released digitally on Martin's self-owned label Sunyata Productions on August 2, 2011, with CD and vinyl versions released in the following months.

In 2021, when asked about his time with Screaming Trees, Lanegan replied, "It's kind of like looking back at grade school. I definitely have fond memories and it's really how I learned to sing — through trial and error, with those guys." Lanegan died on February 22, 2022, at his home in Killarney, Ireland.

Gary Lee Conner revealed on January 18, 2023 that Van Conner had died aged 55. He had previously been in a coma due to stomach surgery, followed by contracting COVID-19. It was reported that pneumonia had ultimately led to his death.

On Black Friday 2023, Wrong Turn to Jahannam: Live From Egg Studio 1991 was released. It consisted of an in-studio rehearsal session by the band which was unreleased up to that point. Dan Peters of Mudhoney played drums on the recording as it was during his brief time in the band as a touring member.

==== Related projects ====
Mark Lanegan released a solo album in May 2001 entitled Field Songs. Also in that year, he became a member of the alternative rock group Queens of the Stone Age with Homme. Lanegan recorded two albums as one of the group's three vocalists before leaving the group in late 2005. His sixth solo album Bubblegum was released in 2004 and became his best-selling album and his first solo album to chart. He went on to work with Greg Dulli in the Gutter Twins and the Twilight Singers. Lanegan also received critical acclaim for his albums with Isobel Campbell, one of which, Ballad of the Broken Seas, was nominated for the 2006 Mercury Music Prize.

Gary Lee Conner started the bands the Purple Outside and Microdot Gnome as the vocalist. He has also done session work with other musicians. In 1999, he released the single "Grasshopper's Daydream/Behind the Smile" on Sub Pop, which featured his former bandmates Homme and Pickerel along with his brother Van as producer. Gary Lee later released four solo albums between 2016 and 2021.

Initially, Van Conner turned his efforts to his side-project Gardener with Aaron Stauffer (formerly of Seaweed, and later VALIS). In 2001, he contributed to Lanegan's album Field Songs. Van has produced and contributed to several other projects over the years, including Kitty Kitty, VALIS, Gardener, and Gary Lee's Sub Pop single "Grasshopper's Daydream/Behind the Smile". Van's band VALIS released several recordings between 2002 and 2012.

Barrett Martin became a touring member for several bands after the breakup of Screaming Trees, including Stone Temple Pilots and R.E.M., and has released two solo albums with limited success. He later contributed to Lanegan's solo album I'll Take Care of You and the album Rated R by Queens of the Stone Age. He later became the drummer for Tuatara and also the drummer/vocalist in The Minus 5. Martin contributed playing drums on two albums by Nando Reis, a Brazilian musician: Para Quando O Arco Irís Encontrar O Pote de Ouro (2000) together with Peter Buck from R.E.M., and A Letra A (2003). In 2019, Martin formed the supergroup Silverlites (featuring Peter Buck, Rich Robinson, and Joseph Arthur) and released their self-titled debut in 2024.

Almost immediately after departing from Screaming Trees in 1991, Mark Pickerel formed the band Truly alongside Robert Roth, original Soundgarden bassist Hiro Yamamoto, and Chris Quinn. Truly released their debut EP Heart and Lungs in 1991, followed by Quinn's departure shortly after. The band stayed as a trio and they released two full-length albums plus a compilation, followed by a hiatus in 1998. Pickerel also played drums on three of Lanegan's solo albums throughout the 1990s. Pickerel released his debut solo album in 2006, Snake in the Radio. He eventually followed it up with three additional solo albums.

== Influences ==
Screaming Trees cited influences including Chris Newman, Greg Sage, the Gun Club, Iggy Pop, New York Dolls, Hugh Cornwell, Lead Belly, Son House, Gordon Lightfoot, Paul Rodgers, Roky Erickson, Rain Parade, the Three O'Clock, the Long Ryders, the Leaving Trains, Donovan, Minutemen, Kiss, the Beach Boys, the Rolling Stones, the Doors, Jimi Hendrix, Cream, Led Zeppelin, Black Sabbath, the Wipers, the Damned, Black Flag and Neil Young.

== Band members ==
- Gary Lee Conner – guitar, backing vocals (1984–2000)
- Van Conner – bass, backing vocals (1984–2000; died 2023)
- Mark Lanegan – lead vocals (1984–2000; died 2022)
- Mark Pickerel – drums, percussion (1984–1991)
- Barrett Martin – drums, percussion, backing vocals (1991–2000)
- Josh Homme – rhythm guitar (1996–1998)

=== Touring members ===
- Donna Dresch – bass (1988, 1991)
- Sean Hollister – drums (1991)
- Dan Peters – drums (1991)

== Discography ==
- Clairvoyance (1986)
- Even If and Especially When (1987)
- Invisible Lantern (1988)
- Buzz Factory (1989)
- Uncle Anesthesia (1991)
- Sweet Oblivion (1992)
- Dust (1996)
- Last Words: The Final Recordings (2011)
