= Steve Fisk =

American record producer

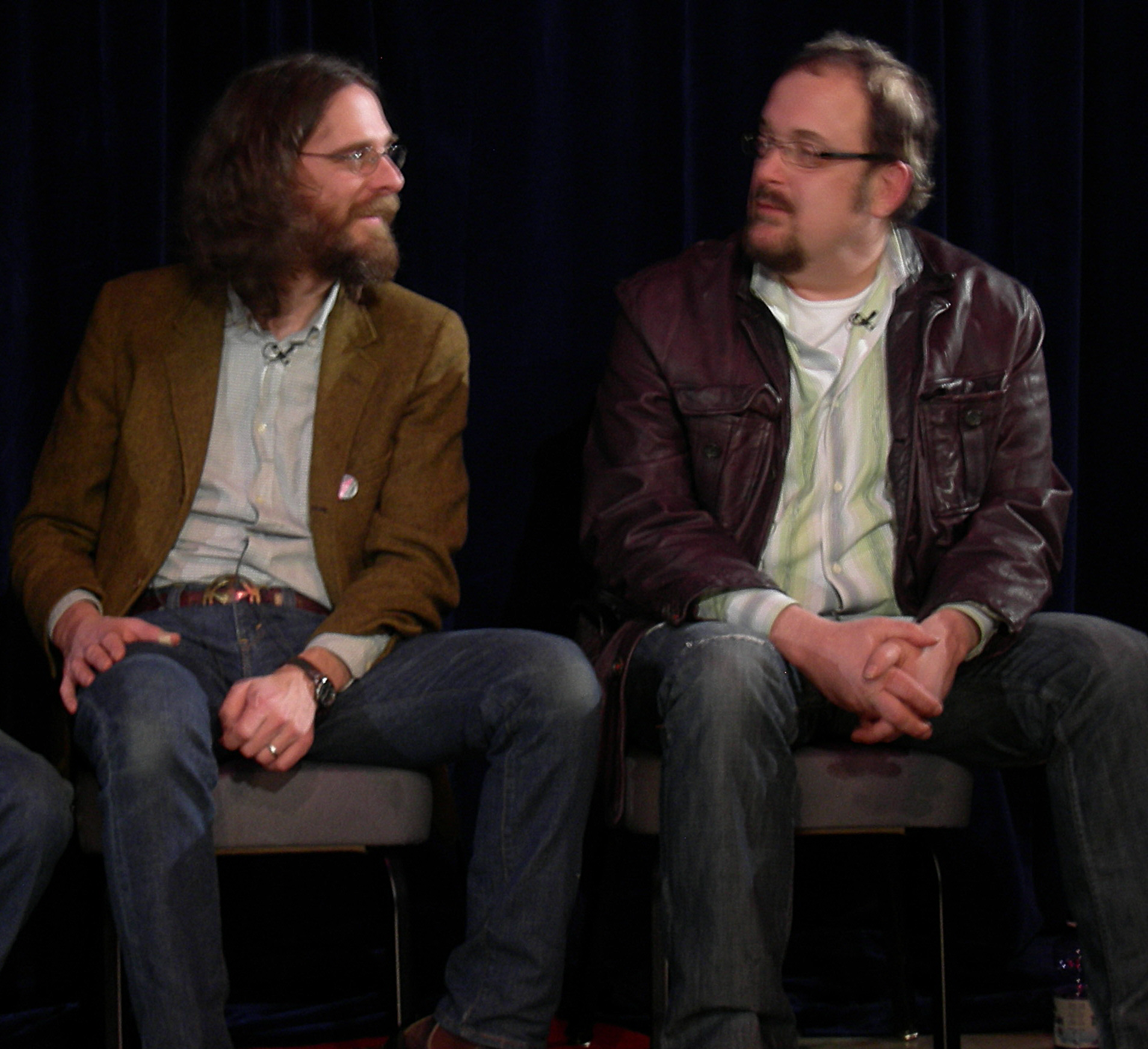
- Fisk (right) with Steve Turner of Mudhoney, 2007

Background information
- Origin: United States
- Genres: Grunge, alternative rock
- Occupation(s): Recording engineer musician record producer
- Years active: 1980–present
- Labels: Sub Pop, K Records

Steve Fisk is an American, Washington-based audio engineer, record producer and musician. As a musician, he has been in bands such as the instrumental alternative/indie rock band Pell Mell and the electronic band Pigeonhed. He has long been associated with the Pacific Northwest music scenes, including grunge and the Sub Pop indie record label.

== Career ==
Fisk made his solo debut in 1980 with contributions to the compilations Let Them Eat Jellybeans!, Sub Pop 5 and Life Elsewhere. In 1982 Fisk joined the Portland-based instrumental band Pell Mell, which issued records on SST. After a move to San Francisco, the group disbanded in 1985 and a few odd turns landed him in Ellensburg, Washington where he produced the Screaming Trees' Other Worlds. In 1986, the group released Clairvoyance. Soon his credits appeared regularly on releases from the Sub Pop and K labels including early releases from Beat Happening and Soundgarden.

In 1990 Fisk moved to Seattle, where he produced Nirvana's Blew sessions, followed by work with Some Velvet Sidewalk, Treepeople, The Reverend Horton Heat, Love Battery, Girl Trouble, Mary Lou Lord, The Afghan Whigs, Unwound, Seaweed, Steven "Jesse" Bernstein, Beat Happening, The Screaming Trees and remixes for Soundgarden. In 1993 he teamed up with vocalist Shawn Smith in the ambient soul duo Pigeonhed, issuing a self-titled LP on Sub Pop.

He shifted to major label production in 1994, helming projects for Imij (for Liberty records), The Wedding Present (for Island records), Schtum (SonyUK) and The 360's (RCA). A year later a reunited Pell Mell issued Interstate on DGC, and for the same label Fisk produced The Posies, Three Mile Pilot and Boss Hog.

In 1994, Pigeonhed recorded its second Sub Pop LP, The Full Sentence, yielding the oft licensed Battle Flag remix by the Lo Fidelity Allstars. It can be heard in ER, Smallville, Dawson's Creek, Queer as Folk, Forces of Nature, Dancing at The Blue Iguana, Coyote Ugly, The Mod Squad as well as many Hollywood trailers. The original Pigeonhed version is featured in The Sopranos, Very Bad Things and The Horse Whisperer.

In 1996, Pell Mell were dropped. "Nothing Lies Still Long" was used in weekly episodes of Six Feet Under. Other tracks from their last album Starcity were featured in Sex and the City. Other 1990's work include recording sessions with Mudhoney, Geraldine Fibbers, Low, Soul Coughing, Damien Jurado, Lois, Agents of Good Roots, Maktub, Joan Osborne, The Halo Benders, and Heather Duby. His third solo album, 999 Levels of Undo, arrived in early 2001 on Sub Pop.

In the 2000s Fisk produced more records for Heather Duby and Maktub as well as solo work with Reggie Watts. Reunion records for The Wedding Present and Harvey Danger. Major label records for Midnight Movies and James Jackson Toth. Indy records with Minus the Bear, Past Lives, Shoplifting, Mark Pickerel, Carrie Akre, Alicia Dara, Paul Manusos and Al Larsen.

In 2005 Fisk co-wrote and produced the score for the award-winning Kurt Cobain documentary About a Son with Ben Gibbard.

In 2010, Fisk began work with KK and his Weathered Underground, mixing their Introducing CD, as well as solo records for members Kyle O'Quin and Thomas Hunter. Other mix work included Quasi, Bitch and The Telephantasm remix for Soundgarden.

Between 2009 and 2011, Fisk composed two 16 channel ambient audio installations for the Experience Music Project's "Nirvana: Taking Punk to the Masses" and "Can't Look Away: The Lure of Horror" exhibits.

In 2015 he received the Stranger Genius award in music. In 2018 he led the mixing team for the original score of the documentary My Country No More, about a North Dakota community's resistance to oil infrastructure planned for their area.

== Bands produced or engineered ==
- Low
- The Posies
- Steven Jesse Bernstein
- Soul Coughing
- Nirvana
- Soundgarden
- Maktub
- SEACATS
- Special Explosion
- Screaming Trees
- The Halo Benders
- The 360's
- Train Wreck
- Calvin Johnson
- The Wedding Present
- Some Velvet Sidewalk
- Moral Crux
- Unwound
- Heather Duby
- Negativland
- Kay Kay & His Weathered Underground
- Damien Jurado
- Beat Happening
- The Geraldine Fibbers
- Boss Hog
- The Blaze Brigade
- 3 mile pilot
- Harvey Danger
- Honor Hall
- Thomas Hunter & White China Gold
- Paul Manousos
- The Unibroz
- Anonymous
- grrRoPoLis
- Spittin Images
- Future Fridays
- The Sexy Accident
- Beautiful Lies
- The Ghost Ease
- Car Seat Headrest
- Naked Giants
- The Action Suits (featuring HATE comics creator Peter Bagge and Fantagraphics co-publisher Eric Reynolds

== Solo discography ==
- Kiss This Day Goodbye, K Records/A.R.P.H., (1983), cassette
- 'Til the Night Closes in, K Records/A.R.P.H., (1985), cassette
- 448 Deathless Days, SST Records, (1987)
- Media Warrior 543-KCMU ,(Erika records), (1988)
- More Valley, K Records, (1989), cassette
- Over and Thru the Night, K Records, (1993), compilation
- 999 Levels of Undo, Sub Pop, (2001)
