= Gary Lee Conner =

American rock musician (born 1962)

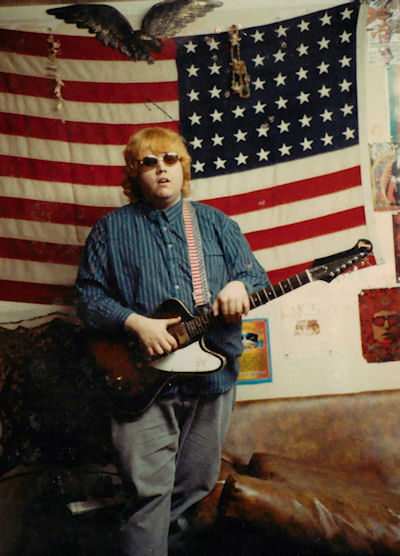
- Conner in 1987

Background information
- Born: Lee Gary Conner; August 22, 1962 (age 63); Fort Irwin, California
- Genres: Grunge, alternative rock, psychedelic rock
- Occupation: Musician
- Instrument: Guitar
- Labels: Velvetone; SST; Epic

Gary Lee Conner (born Lee Gary Conner, August 22, 1962) is an American rock musician, best known as the guitarist for Screaming Trees.

== Career ==
Originally from Ellensburg, Washington, Conner formed the band Explosive Generation with his brother Van Conner and Mark Pickerel in the early 1980s. That band later evolved into Screaming Trees with the addition of singer Mark Lanegan in 1985. The band moved to Seattle in the late 1980s to join that city's burgeoning alternative rock scene. Conner played on seven studio albums with Screaming Trees until the band split in 2000.

Conner released the album Mystery Lane in 1990, under the group name The Purple Outside. During the 1990s he made regular guest appearances on recordings by other alternative rock acts. After the demise of Screaming Trees, Conner retired from music for ten years, and re-emerged with a new band called The Microdot Gnome. That band released the album 4D Sugarcubes in 2010. Starting in 2016 he began releasing albums under his own name, most recently Revelations in Fuzz in 2021.

== Selected discography ==
For his work with Screaming Trees, see Screaming Trees discography.

- Mystery Lane (The Purple Outside, 1990)
- 4D Sugarcubes (The Microdot Gnome, 2010)
- Ether Trippers (solo, 2016)
- Unicorn Curry (solo, 2018)
- Revelations in Fuzz (solo, 2020)
- The Opposite of Christmas (solo, 2020)
- Thutheater (solo, 2022)
