= Van Conner =

American rock musician (1967–2023)

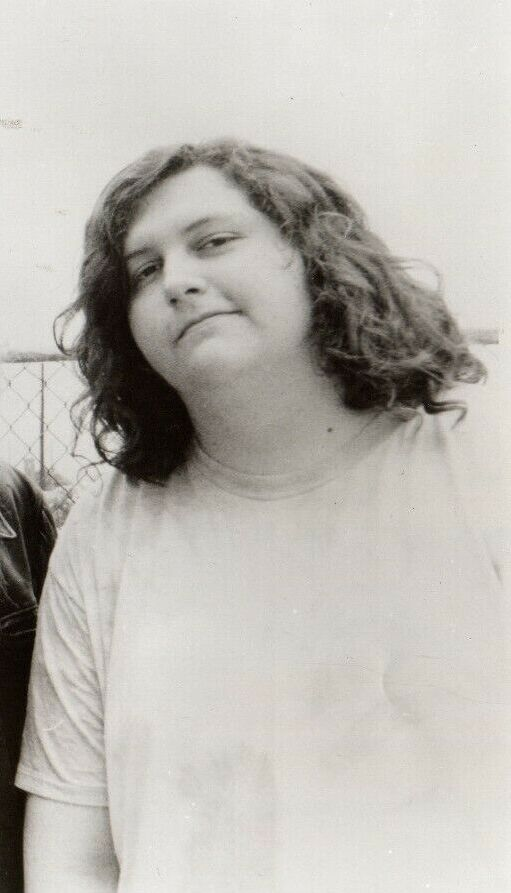
- Conner with Screaming Trees in the 1980s

Background information
- Born: Van Patrick Conner; March 17, 1967; Apple Valley, California, U.S.
- Died: January 17, 2023 (aged 55)
- Genres: Grunge, psychedelic rock, alternative rock
- Occupation: Musician
- Instruments: Bass; guitar; vocals
- Years active: 1984–2023
- Labels: Velvetone Records, SST, Epic, Small Stone
- Formerly of: Screaming Trees; Gardener; VALIS; Solomon Grundy

Van Patrick Conner (March 17, 1967 – January 17, 2023) was an American rock musician, best known as the bassist for Screaming Trees.

== Career ==
As a bass player in high school, Conner formed the band Explosive Generation with his brother Gary Lee Conner and Mark Pickerel. That band later evolved into Screaming Trees with the addition of singer Mark Lanegan in 1985. The band moved from their native Ellensburg, Washington to Seattle in the late 1980s to join that city's burgeoning alternative rock scene. Conner played on seven studio albums with Screaming Trees until the band split in 2000.

While he was with Screaming Trees, Conner formed the side project Solomon Grundy, in which he performed lead vocals and guitar. That band released an album in 1990, and during that period Conner also joined a live lineup of Dinosaur Jr. He later formed another side project called Gardener, which released an album in 1999. After the breakup of Screaming Trees, Conner worked as a session musician and had formed several additional alternative rock bands, including VALIS and Musk Ox.

== Illness and death ==
In December 2021, Conner fell into a comatose state after suffering complications from emergency stomach surgery. While hospitalized, Conner also contracted an infection of COVID-19, severely worsening his condition. Conner would continue to struggle with respiratory and mobility issues for the rest of his life.

Conner died from pneumonia on January 17, 2023, at the age of 55.

== Selected discography ==
For his work with Screaming Trees, see Screaming Trees discography.

- Solomon Grundy (Solomon Grundy, 1990)
- New Dawning Time (Gardener, 1999)
- Vast Active Living Intelligence System (VALIS, 2002)
- Head Full of Pills (VALIS, 2004)
- Dark Matter (VALIS, 2009)
- Minds Through Space and Time (VALIS, 2012)
- Coming Back Again (Van Conner, 2018)
