= Rani (disambiguation) =

Rani is an Indian given name or refers to a female princely ruler.

Rani may also refer to:

== Film and television ==
- Rani (1943 film), a Bollywood film
- Rani (1952 film), an Indian Tamil language film
- Rani (2016 film), an Indian film
- Rani (2025 film), an upcoming Sri Lankan Sinhalese biographical drama thriller film
- Rani (Pakistani TV series), a Pakistani TV series.
- Rani (French TV series), a 2011 French TV series

== People ==
- Rani (Pakistani actress) (1946–1993), Pakistani film and television actress
- Rani (Tamil actress), Indian actress
- Rani (Australian singer) (born 1971)
- Rani (Dutch singer) (born 1999)

== Other uses ==
- Rani (tribe), a medieval Slavic tribe
- Rani, Rajasthan, an Indian city, situated in Rajasthan's state.
- Rani, Bachhwara, an Indian village in Bihar
- Räni, an Estonian village
- Rani, Iran, an Iranian village in Fars Province
- Rani (poem), a Malayalam narrative poem, written by Thirunalloor Karunakaran
- Rani, an island in Supiori Regency, Papua province, Indonesia
- Raney Nickel, often abbreviated as RaNi
- Rani, fictional character in the 2023 Indian film Rocky Aur Rani Kii Prem Kahaani
- Raani, fictional character in the Saheb, Biwi Aur Gangster Indian film series
- The Rani, a fictional character in TV's Doctor Who
- Rani, a fictional character from the TV series The Lion Guard
- Rani juice, a fruit-based juice beverage sold in the Middle East.
- Rivers Agency Northern Ireland

== See also ==
- Ranee (disambiguation)
- Maharani (disambiguation)
- Raja (disambiguation)
- Rana (disambiguation)
- Ranni (disambiguation)
- Raja Rani (disambiguation)
