= Rana =

Rana may refer to:

== Astronomy ==
- Rana (crater), a crater on Mars
- Delta Eridani or Rana, a star

== Films ==
- Rana (2012 film), an Indian action drama
- Rana (cancelled film), an unfinished Indian film by K. S. Ravikumar
- Yuvaratna Rana, a 1998 Indian film directed by A. Kodandarami Reddy

== People ==
- Rana (name), a given name and surname of multiple origins
- Raña, a Spanish surname
- Rana dynasty, a ruling dynasty in Nepal (1846–1951)

== Places ==
- Rana, Burkina Faso, a town in Boulkiemdé Province
- Raná (Chrudim District), a municipality and village in Pardubice Region, Czech Republic
- Raná (Louny District), a municipality and village in Ústí nad Labem Region, Czech Republic
- Rana Municipality, a municipality in Nordland County, Norway
- Råna, a mountain in Møre og Romsdal County, Norway
- Rana Colony, a town in Punjab Province, Pakistan
- Ra'na, a former village in Palestine
- Rana, a medieval principality on the island of Rügen, Germany

== Other uses ==
- Rana (genus), a genus of frogs
- Rana (software), a vocal for the Vocaloid 3 singing voice synthesizer
- Rana (title), a historical title
- Rana language (disambiguation), several languages
- Rana FM, a Canadian Pashto-language radio station
- Rana Institute of Higher Studies, a university in Kabul, Afghanistan
- Rana Plaza, a building in Dhaka, Bangladesh that collapsed in 2013
- Royal Animal Nursing Auxiliary (RANA), a job title – see Paraveterinary worker
- Rana, a pinning position in professional wrestling
- Rana, a codename for an AMD Phenom microprocessor
- RANA, a band formed in New Jersey in the 1990s featuring Scott Metzger
- Frog, rana is the Spanish word for frog.

== See also ==
- Ranam (disambiguation)
- Rani (disambiguation)
- Rane (disambiguation)
- Ranna (disambiguation)
