= Precious Blood (song) =

Single by the Gits

from the album Enter: The Conquering Chicken
- B-side: "Social Love"
- Released: 1990
- Recorded: 1990
- Genre: Punk rock
- Label: Broken Rekids
- Songwriter(s): The Gits

The Gits singles chronology
| "Precious Blood" (1990) | "Second Skin" (1991) |

"Precious Blood" is the debut single by American punk rock band the Gits, and their first official release. The record was released as a limited edition 7-inch single of only 800 copies by the local Seattle label Big Flaming Ego Records. Included in the track listing were early versions of "Precious Blood" and "Seaweed" (later re-recorded for the Enter: The Conquering Chicken album) as well as "Kings & Queens" (later included on the Frenching the Bully album).

== Track listing ==
1. "Precious Blood"
2. "Seaweed"
3. "Kings & Queens"
