= Seafish Louisville =

Compilation album by The Gits
- Released: September 25, 2000
- Recorded: 1991–1993
- Genre: Punk rock
- Label: Broken Rekids
- Producers: Jack Endino, Steve Moriarty, The Gits

The Gits chronology
Kings & Queens (1996)	Seafish Louisville (2000)	Best of The Gits (2008)

Professional ratings
Review scores
Source	Rating
AllMusic	4.5/5 stars
Austin Chronicle	3.5/4 stars
Los Angeles Times	3/4 stars

Seafish Louisville is a compilation of songs by The Gits. It was released on the Broken Rekids label in 2000, seven years after the murder of the band's frontwoman, Mia Zapata. It is primarily a collection of live tracks and alternative takes, including the then newly discovered track "Whirlwind." The CD+ section of the CD includes the video for "Seaweed" as well as photographs and lyrics.

== Track listing ==
1. "Whirlwind" – 3:03
2. "Seaweed" – 2:27
3. "Absynthe" (Live) – 3:21
4. "Another Shot of Whiskey" (Live) – 2:35
5. "Insecurities" (Live) – 1:39
6. "Slaughter of Bruce" (Live) – 3:19
7. "Precious Blood" – 4:16
8. "While You're Twisting, I'm Still Breathing" – 2:36
9. "A"– 1:25
10. "Social Love" (Live) – 1:55
11. "It Doesn't Matter" – 3:27
12. "Kings & Queens" – 2:00
13. "Wingo Lamo" (Live) – 2:16
14. "Here's To Your Fuck" (Live) – 2:02
15. "Second Skin" (Live) – 2:58
16. "Daily Bread" – 6:03
17. (CD+ content)
- Live tracks recorded at RKCNDY, Seattle, Washington, on January 14, 1993.
