= Maharaj Ji =

Maharaj Ji, Maharaji, or similar, may refer to:

- Prem Rawat (born 1957), teacher of a meditation practice he calls Knowledge
- Guru Maharaj Ji (Nigeria), spiritual leader in Nigeria
- Neem Karoli Baba (died 1973), Hindu guru and devotee of the Hindu deity Ram
- Rajinder Singh (Sant Mat) (born 1946), head of Science of Spirituality
- Satpal Maharaj (born 1951), member of the lower house of the Parliament of India for the Indian National Congress party

== See also ==
- Maharaja (disambiguation)
