= Mia Zapata =

American singer (1965–1993)

Background information
- Born: Mia Katherine Zapata; August 25, 1965; Chicago, Illinois, U.S.
- Died: July 7, 1993 (aged 27) Seattle, Washington, U.S.
- Cause of death: Homicide by strangulation
- Genres: Punk rock; hardcore punk; riot grrrl
- Occupations: Singer; songwriter
- Years active: 1986–1993
- Label: C/Z Records
- Formerly of: The Gits

Mia Katherine Zapata (August 25, 1965 – July 7, 1993) was an American musician who was the lead vocalist and lyricist of the punk rock band the Gits. As part of the burgeoning Seattle music scene, she was noted for her powerful vocals and fiery stage presence.

Zapata was raped and murdered while walking home from the Comet Tavern in July 1993, at the age of 27. The Gits had accepted an offer to be signed to Atlantic Records and were about to embark on a national tour at the time of her death. In December 2002, nearly a decade after the murder, DNA evidence obtained from the crime scene was tested and identified Jesus Mezquia as the perpetrator, leading to his arrest in January 2003. In March 2004, Mezquia was convicted of first-degree felony murder and sentenced to 36 years in prison.

== Life and career ==
Mia Zapata was born on August 25, 1965, in Chicago, Illinois, and was raised in Louisville, Kentucky, where she attended high school at Presentation Academy. She was of Mexican descent and was distantly related to Emiliano and Eufemio Zapata. Zapata was the youngest of three children, with a brother named Eric and a sister named Kristen. Both of her parents, Donna and Richard Zapata, were television executives. Zapata learned how to play the guitar and the piano by age nine, and was influenced by punk rock as well as jazz, blues, and R&B singers such as Bessie Smith, Billie Holiday, Jimmy Reed, Ray Charles, Hank Williams, and Sam Cooke.

In 1984, Zapata enrolled at Antioch College in Yellow Springs, Ohio, as a liberal arts student. In September 1986, she and three friends formed the punk rock band the Gits. In 1989, the band relocated to Seattle. Zapata found a job at a local bar and the four band members moved into an abandoned house they called "The Rathouse". The band released a series of well-received singles on local independent record labels from 1990 to 1991. As the Gits were making a name for themselves in the local music scene, they often played shows with their friends' band 7 Year Bitch. In 1992, the band released its debut album Frenching the Bully. Their reputation progressively increased within the grunge scene in Seattle, before the band began work on their second and final album Enter: The Conquering Chicken, released posthumously in 1994.

Zapata came from an affluent family but often lived without material comforts. As her father described it: "Mia [lived] in two different worlds. She lived on two different sides of the street—the straight side on one, with parochial schools, an affluent family, and tennis clubs. But when she crossed the street, material things didn't mean anything to her." Zapata's music often led to a rejection of financial comfort, but regardless of status, Valerie Agnew describes her as "commanding respect and interest immediately".

Zapata was well connected to her community. Peter Sheehy recalls: "Mia [was] the hub of several social circles; a magnetic personality who drew all sorts of people together who otherwise might never have met." On his way to her wake in Seattle, Zapata's father became lost and recalls many people carrying yellow roses: the admission ticket to her service. Judge Sharon Armstrong, the judge during her killer's trial, highlighted Zapata as an "extraordinarily vibrant" woman, who was "obviously talented"; she was "struck by how closely Zapata had connected to so many people".

== The Gits ==
The Gits, who included guitarist Andrew "Joe Spleen" Kessler, drummer Steve Moriarty, and bassist Matt Dresdner, met in Ohio in 1986. A few years later, the band decided to move to Seattle to engage in the city's burgeoning music scene. The band quickly developed a following within the local underground punk scene. The band as a whole and Zapata in particular became popular with the Seattle feminist community.

In 1990 the Gits went on a successful international tour without the support of a record label. In 1992, their first independent album, Frenching the Bully, was released. The album had hits such as "Another Shot of Whiskey", "Second Skin", and "Here's to Your Fuck", receiving positive reviews. The band had planned a large U.S. and European tour as well a series of local shows and was being courted by various labels. Before the band could finish and release their second album, Enter: The Conquering Chicken, Zapata was murdered.

After Zapata's death, the band continued to make music and found success in their second album with singles such as "Seaweed" and "Precious Blood".

== Murder and investigation ==
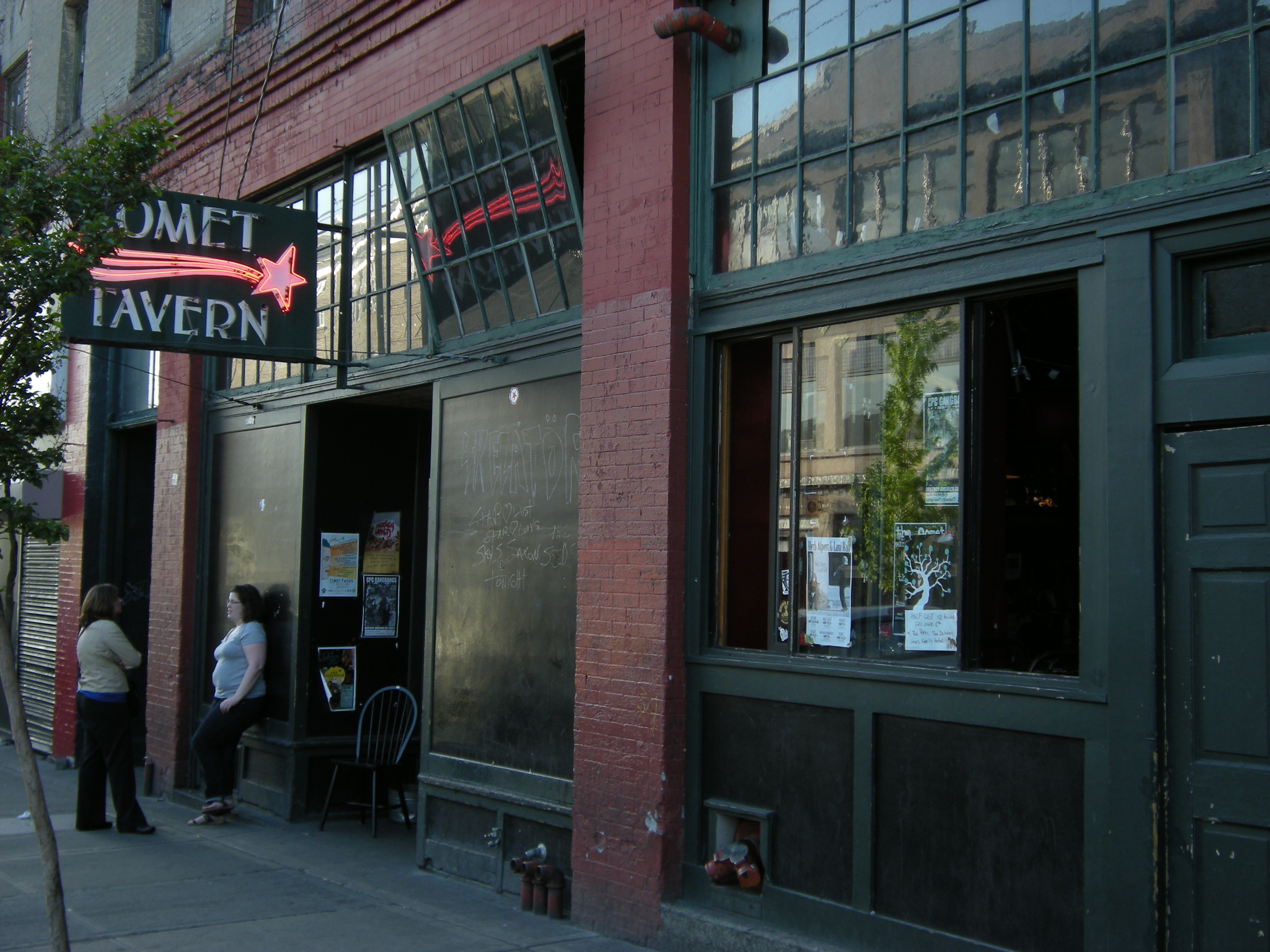
Comet Tavern in Capitol Hill

Shortly after 2:00 a.m. on July 7, 1993, Zapata left the Comet Tavern, a dive bar in Capitol Hill that was a popular hangout for the Seattle music community. She stayed at a studio space in the basement of an apartment building located a block away, and briefly visited a friend who lived on the second floor. This was the last time Zapata was seen alive. She may have walked a few blocks west, or north to a friend's apartment, or may have decided to take the long walk south to her home. Her body was discovered at 3:20 a.m. near the intersection of 24th Avenue South and South Washington Street. Zapata had been beaten, raped, and strangled, and it is believed she encountered her attacker shortly after 2:15 a.m. Her body was not initially identified as she had no identification on her when she was found. An episode of the cable television show Forensic Files revealed that she was identified after the medical examiner, who was a fan of the Gits and had been to their concerts, recognized her. According to the medical examiner, if she had not been strangled, she would have died from the internal injuries suffered from the beating. According to court documents, an autopsy found evidence of a struggle in which Zapata suffered blunt impact to her abdomen and a lacerated liver.

The Seattle Police Department initially focused their investigation on Zapata's circle of friends, believing that her murderer must have been someone she knew. Frustrated by the lack of progress in solving the case, the surviving members of the Gits, the Seattle music community, including some of its most famous bands such as Nirvana, Pearl Jam, and Soundgarden, helped raise $70,000 generated from benefit concerts and record sales, as well as their own money. They hired private investigator Leigh Hearon to supplement the police department's investigation. The funds dried up without any major breaks in the case, but Hearon continued to investigate on her own time. In 1996, the case gained national attention on an episode of Unsolved Mysteries, and was later highlighted on several television programs, including A&E's American Justice, Cold Case Files, City Confidential, CBS's 48 Hours, FOX's America's Most Wanted, and TruTV's Forensic Files. In 1998, after five years of investigation, Seattle police detective Dale Tallman said: "We're no closer to solving the case than we were right after the murder."

== Arrest and trial ==
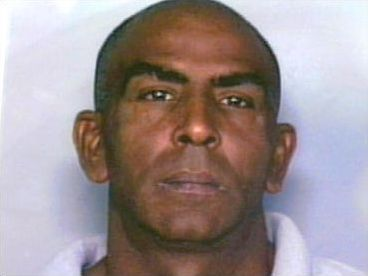
Mug shot of Jesus Mezquia taken following his arrest by the Miami Police Department in 2003.

In December 2002, a random DNA test conducted by the Seattle Police Department's Cold Case Unit and the Washington State Patrol Crime Laboratory identified the perpetrator as 48-year-old fisherman Jesus Mezquia. Mezquia had come from Cuba in 1980 in the Mariel boatlift and moved to Seattle in 1992, where he resided until 1994. A DNA profile was extracted from saliva found on a bite mark on Zapata's breast and kept in cold storage until the STR technology was developed for full extraction. An original entry in June 2002 failed to generate a positive result, but Mezquia's DNA entered CODIS after he was arrested in Florida for burglary and domestic abuse in 2002. Mezquia had a history of violence against women including domestic abuse, burglary, assault, and battery. All of his ex-girlfriends, and his wife, had filed reports against him, and there was no known prior link between Mezquia and Zapata. Mezquia was arrested in Miami by Seattle police officers on January 10, 2003, and was charged with premeditated first degree murder, and alternatively, with first degree felony murder based on first or second degree rape.

At the trial, the prosecution argued that Mezquia saw Zapata leave the bar and followed her a short distance before he attacked her. Her headphones covered her ears so she would have been unaware of any danger until he grabbed her and dragged her to his car, where he assaulted her in the back seat. Mezquia did not testify in his own defense and maintained his innocence. He argued that either Robert Jenkins, Zapata's ex-boyfriend and a Vietnam veteran suffering from PTSD, or Scott McFarlane, a taxi driver who allegedly made incriminating statements about Zapata's murder, were responsible.

On March 25, 2004, a jury convicted Mezquia of first degree felony murder and he was sentenced to 36 years in prison, the maximum allowed in the case under Washington state law. In August 2005, the state Court of Appeals affirmed his conviction, but reversed his sentence because the judge had exceeded the normal sentencing range without the jury's specific approval. Mezquia's case was sent back to the trial court for resentencing. However, after Mezquia waived his right to have a jury decide on his sentence, the trial court judge again imposed the same sentence of 36 years. Mezquia died in the hospital in Pierce County, Washington on January 21, 2021, at the age of 66.

== Aftermath ==
Zapata's murder sent shockwaves through the underground music scene and caused a sense of defeat and fear within the community. The Seattle Times marked the murder as the moment "the Seattle scene lost its sense of invincibility." Cristen Storm recalls Zapata's death as a reality check, stating: "[They were] all very tough people and as a group of women, [they] are all really strong, outspoken, and hard-hitting, very opinionated women and that perception of, 'We're not victims at all in any way and this can't happen to women that aren't victims,' and I think [Zapata's death] shattered that myth for us, [and showed] that it happens to all types of women."

Following her murder, a number of women from the Seattle music scene began to meet and discuss the prevalence of violence against women within the community, and the lack of available resources such as self-defense classes, which were considered impractical and unaffordable. These informal meetings sparked heated arguments in the living rooms of those involved, as the group had trouble deciding how to organize and agree on the best methods of training to teach, so they chose to bring in teachers to help direct the course of their learning. This led to the creation of the non-profit group Home Alive, which subsequently organized benefit concerts and released albums with the participation of many bands, including Nirvana, Pearl Jam, Soundgarden, Heart, and the Presidents of the United States of America. Joan Jett also recorded an album with the surviving members of the Gits called Evil Stig ("Gits Live" backwards).

7 Year Bitch, who were close friends with the band, released their second studio album ¡Viva Zapata! in May 1994 on C/Z Records, as a tribute to Zapata. The album cover depicts Zapata wearing bullet sashes, and some of the songs such as "M.I.A." and "Rock A Bye", directly address her murder. Jett and Kathleen Hanna wrote a song called "Go Home" that was later released on Jett's 1994 album, Pure and Simple. A music video for "Go Home" was also released, which depicts a woman who is being stalked and attacked but is then able to defend herself against the assailant.

In May 2005, The Gits Movie, a documentary about Zapata's life, the Gits, and the Seattle music scene, premiered at the Seattle International Film Festival. Another version of the film was screened two years later at the 2007 SXSW (South By Southwest) Film Festival. The final cut was theatrically released in over 20 cities in North America on July 7, 2008, the 15th anniversary of Zapata's death. The following day, the film was released on DVD along with a Best of the Gits CD. In February 2013, a play called These Streets, inspired by the stories of and featuring music by Zapata and other female musicians in Seattle, debuted at the ACT Theatre in Seattle.

== Legacy ==
Zapata is often cast as a symbol for feminist activism, a martyr, and an angel. Dresdner said: "[Mia] was sainted, and that was very peculiar... she became this icon for feminism and all kinds of things that she had very little to do with in her actual life." Margaret O'Neil Girouard, who wrote her thesis on Zapata, believes she is an example of female artists being classified based on the perceived motivations behind their art. It has been speculated that this association may be due to her presence as a "charismatic female musician" in the Northwest, who was performing throughout the emergence of the riot grrrl movement. Moriarty wrote: "[Mia wanted] to relate to people on a personal level in her lyrics [rather] than on a political level." He also stated in an interview that "We’d still be a band if Mia hadn’t died. I’m just grateful that no one else died in the band."

Zapata is interred at Cave Hill Cemetery in Louisville, Kentucky.

== In popular culture ==
The documentary film Bad Reputation (2018) describes how Joan Jett worked with Zapata's band the Gits to fund an investigation to solve the case.

== Bibliography ==
- Johnson, Tracy (2004-03-26). "11 years later, justice for slain singer Zapata". Seattle Post-Intelligencer.
