= Kings and Queens =

Kings and Queens may refer to:

- A royal family, which often consists of kings and/or queens

== Music ==
=== Albums ===
- Kings & Queens (Sham 69 album), 1993
- Kings & Queens (The Gits album), 1996
- Kings and Queens (Axel Rudi Pell album), 2004
- Kings and Queens (Anti-Nowhere League album), 2005
- Kings & Queens (Jamie T album), 2009
- Kings & Queens (Eddie Kirkland album), 2012
- Kings & Queens (Audio Adrenaline album), 2013

=== Songs ===
- "Kings and Queens" (Aerosmith song), 1978
- "Kings and Queens" (Killing Joke song), 1985
- "Kings and Queens" (Thirty Seconds to Mars song), 2009
- "Kings & Queens" (Audio Adrenaline song), 2012
- "Kings & Queens" (Ava Max song), 2020
- "Kings and Queens", a song from the 2005 album The Circle of Life by Freedom Call
- "Kings & Queens", a song by New Zealand singer/songwriter Brooke Fraser
- "Kings & Queens", a song by Luna Halo from their self-titled album
- "King & Queens", a song by Tyga from Careless World: Rise of the Last King
- "Kings And Queens", a song by Soft Machine
- "Kings And Queens", a song by MisterWives

== See also ==
- King and Queen (disambiguation)
- Kings (disambiguation)
- Queens (disambiguation)
- Kings and Queen, 2004 French film
- Queens and Kings, a 2007 album by Fanfare Ciocărlia
- List of monarchs
- Kings and Queens – 1200 Years of English & British Monarchs, a 2023 book by Iain Dale
