= The Gits =

American punk rock band

- The Gits in 1992

Background information
- Origin: Seattle, Washington, U.S.
- Genre: Punk rock
- Years active: 1986–1993
- Labels: Sub Pop; Broken Rekids; C/Z; Empty; Big Flaming Ego
- Past members: Mia Zapata; Andy Kessler; Matt Dresdner; Steve Moriarty
- Website: thegits.com

The Gits were an American punk rock band from Yellow Springs, Ohio, formed in 1986. The band was founded by vocalist Mia Zapata, guitarist Andy Kessler, bassist Matt Dresdner, and drummer Steve Moriarty. As part of the burgeoning Seattle music scene of the early 1990s, they were known for their fiery live performances, with Zapata earning particular praise for her powerful vocals.

Establishing themselves as one of Seattle's most promising bands, the Gits had accepted an offer to be signed to Atlantic Records in June 1993. However, their career was cut short when Zapata was raped and murdered in July 1993, shortly before the band were about to embark on their first national tour. In response, the surviving members of the Gits formed the supergroup Evil Stig with Joan Jett, organized benefit concerts, and raised $70,000 to hire a private investigator to find Zapata's killer. The case went cold for nearly a decade due to lack of evidence, suspects, and witnesses, becoming one of the most notorious unsolved murders in Seattle history. After DNA evidence linked Jesus Mezquia to the crime in December 2002, he was arrested in Miami in January 2003, convicted of first degree felony murder in March 2004, and sentenced to 36 years in prison.

The Gits released two studio albums, one compilation of early recordings, one live recording, and three 7-inch singles through C/Z Records, and appeared on various compilations. In 2003, the band's entire discography was remastered and expanded with bonus tracks, which was reissued through Broken Rekids. In 2024, their discography was remastered again by Jack Endino and reissued through Sub Pop.

== History ==
=== Formation and early history ===
The Gits met and formed in 1986 at Antioch College, a liberal arts school in Yellow Springs, Ohio. They called themselves the 'Snivelling Little Rat Faced Gits' (a reference to a Monty Python skit), but soon shortened the moniker to just 'The Gits'. In 1988 they recorded and self-released their "unofficial" debut album entitled Private Lubs with the help of friend Ben London (later of Alcohol Funnycar and solo). These recordings did not see widespread release until 1996, when the album was reissued by the Broken Rekids label as Kings & Queens.

=== Local following ===
"Cut My Skin, It Makes Me Human"
Sample of the 1992 Gits track "Cut My Skin" off Frenching the Bully, an example of Mia Zapata's vocals

After relocating to Seattle, Washington, in 1989, the band set up shop at "the Rathouse", an abandoned house in the Capitol Hill district where they rehearsed and lived. One of their first live shows in Seattle was at the University of Washington on January 6, 1990, in which they played on the same bill with Nirvana and Tad. They quickly earned a following in the local scene and gained many friends, particularly in the city's punk rock community. During the early 1990s, buzz began surrounding the band, which caused some media outlets to erroneously lump them in with the then-burgeoning Seattle grunge music scene, and Zapata's persona led many to incorrectly associate the Gits with the Olympia, Washington, riot grrrl movement.

The band's first official release was the single "Precious Blood", released in 1990 by the local Big Flaming Ego Records. This was quickly followed up by two more releases, "Second Skin" on Broken Rekids (1991) and "Spear & Magic Helmet" on Empty Records (1991), as well as the Bobbing For Pavement compilation (Rathouse/Broken Rekids, 1991).

In 1992 the band recorded and released their debut album, Frenching the Bully.

In the spring of 1993, former music journalist and musician Tim Sommer had planned to sign the Gits to Atlantic Records, where he was working in the A&R department. Sommer said he had made a deal to sign the Gits to Atlantic four days before Zapata's death.

== Murder of Mia Zapata ==
Shortly after 2:00 a.m. on July 7, 1993, Zapata left the Comet Tavern, a dive bar in Capitol Hill that was a popular hangout for the Seattle music community. She stayed at a studio space in the basement of an apartment building located a block away, and briefly visited a friend who lived on the second floor. This was the last time Zapata was seen alive. She may have walked a few blocks west, or north to a friend's apartment, or may have decided to take the long walk south to her home. Her body was discovered at 3:20 a.m. near the intersection of 24th Avenue South and South Washington Street. Zapata had been beaten, raped, and strangled, and it is believed she encountered her attacker shortly after 2:15 a.m. Her body was not initially identified as she had no identification on her when she was found. An episode of Forensic Files revealed that she was identified after the medical examiner, who was a fan of the Gits and had been to their concerts, recognized her. According to the medical examiner, if she had not been strangled, she would have died from the internal injuries suffered from the beating. According to court documents, an autopsy found evidence of a struggle in which Zapata suffered blunt impact to her abdomen and a lacerated liver.

The Seattle Police Department initially focused their investigation on Zapata's circle of friends, believing that her murderer must have been someone she knew. Frustrated by the lack of progress in solving the case, the surviving members of the Gits, the Seattle music community, including some of its most famous bands such as Nirvana, Pearl Jam, and Soundgarden, helped raise $70,000 generated from benefit concerts and record sales, as well as their own money. They hired private investigator Leigh Hearon to supplement the police department's investigation. The funds dried up without any major breaks in the case, but Hearon continued to investigate on her own time. In 1996, the case gained national attention on an episode of Unsolved Mysteries, and was later highlighted on several television programs, including A&E's American Justice, Cold Case Files, City Confidential, CBS's 48 Hours, FOX's America's Most Wanted, and TruTV's Forensic Files. In 1998, after five years of investigation, Seattle police detective Dale Tallman said: "We're no closer to solving the case than we were right after the murder."

In December 2002, a random DNA test conducted by the Seattle Police Department's Cold Case Unit and the Washington State Patrol Crime Laboratory identified the perpetrator as 48-year-old fisherman Jesus Mezquia. Mezquia had come from Cuba in 1980 in the Mariel boatlift and moved to Seattle in 1992, where he resided until 1994. A DNA profile was extracted from saliva found on a bite mark on Zapata's breast and kept in cold storage until the STR technology was developed for full extraction. An original entry in June 2002 failed to generate a positive result, but Mezquia's DNA entered CODIS after he was arrested in Florida for burglary and domestic abuse in 2002. Mezquia had a history of violence against women including domestic abuse, burglary, assault, and battery. All of his ex-girlfriends, and his wife, had filed reports against him, and there was no known prior link between Mezquia and Zapata. Mezquia was arrested in Miami by Seattle police officers on January 10, 2003, and was charged with premeditated first degree murder, and alternatively, with first degree felony murder based on first or second degree rape.

At the trial, the prosecution argued that Mezquia saw Zapata leave the bar and followed her a short distance before he attacked her. Her headphones covered her ears so she would have been unaware of any danger until he grabbed her and dragged her to his car, where he assaulted her in the back seat. Mezquia did not testify in his own defense and maintained his innocence. He argued that either Robert Jenkins, Zapata's ex-boyfriend and a Vietnam veteran suffering from PTSD, or Scott McFarlane, a taxi driver who allegedly made incriminating statements about Zapata's murder, were responsible.

On March 25, 2004, a jury convicted Mezquia of first degree felony murder and he was sentenced to 36 years in prison, the maximum allowed in the case under Washington state law. In August 2005, the state Court of Appeals affirmed his conviction, but reversed his sentence because the judge had exceeded the normal sentencing range without the jury's specific approval. Mezquia's case was sent back to the trial court for resentencing. However, after Mezquia waived his right to have a jury decide on his sentence, the trial court judge again imposed the same sentence of 36 years. Mezquia died in hospital in Pierce County, Washington on January 21, 2021, at the age of 66.

== Legacy ==
=== Home Alive ===
In the aftermath of Zapata's murder, friends created a non-profit self-defense group called Home Alive, which organized benefit concerts and CDs with the participation of several bands, including Nirvana, Pearl Jam, Soundgarden, Heart, and the Presidents of the United States of America. The Home Alive group, which ceased operations in 2010, sought to empower women with ways to protect themselves against predators. They held a range of courses, from anger management and use of pepper spray to the martial arts.

=== Dedications ===
Portland, Oregon-based alternative rock band Everclear dedicated their 1993 album World of Noise to Zapata. The California hardcore band Retching Red included a Gits cover ("Spear and Magic Helmet") on their debut album Get Your Red Wings. Also, the alt-country band Richmond Fontaine have a tribute song to the band, called "The Gits".

Punk rock band 7 Year Bitch, who were good friends and briefly label mates of the Gits, named their 1994 album ¡Viva Zapata! in tribute to Mia Zapata. The album cover also featured a painting by artist Scott Musgrove featuring Zapata wearing bullet sashes. The song "M.I.A.", which explicitly deals with Zapata's death, appears on this album.

=== Films ===
In 1996, Hype!—a documentary about the Seattle scene, featuring The Gits—came out. Nine years later, in 2005, a movie chronicling the life of Mia Zapata during her time with The Gits was released. The final cut of the film was released theatrically in over 20 North American cities on July 7, 2008, the 15th memorial anniversary of Zapata's death. The following day saw the film released on DVD along with a Best of the Gits CD (both from Liberation Entertainment).

The story of the Gits was made into a "lively and engaging" documentary film, titled simply The Gits, and reflected a renewed interest in the band. The film, directed by Kerri O'Kane, had its first screenings in 2005 at the Seattle International Film Festival. A finalized version of the film was accepted and screened at the 2007 SXSW (South By Southwest) Film Festival held March 9–17, 2007, in Austin, Texas. In her review for NPR, Sarah Bardeen found that "Above all, we fall for the music. Compared to many of their contemporaries, the Gits were instrumentally brilliant, playing fast, tight, classic punk rock which took a radical left turn when Zapata added her voice to the mix".

== Related projects ==
Following the posthumous completion of Enter: The Conquering Chicken, Spleen formed a hardcore punk band called the Dancing French Liberals of '48, and later toured briefly with Poison Idea. Dancing French Liberals of '48 featured all of the remaining Gits as well as longtime friend and guitarist Julian Gibson (ex-DC Beggars). Their music was, as expected, much in the vein of the Gits although with a more hardcore punk attitude. Together the Liberals issued an EP (Scream Clown Scream) and a full-length album (Powerline) on the Broken Rekids label before disbanding in the late 1990s.

Following Zapata's death, Joan Jett and Bikini Kill frontwoman Kathleen Hanna co-wrote a song (entitled "Go Home") inspired by Zapata's death. Jett also included a message at the end of her video for the song asking for any information anyone had in regard to Zapata's murder. After seeing the video the remaining members of the Gits approached Jett about touring with the band. Jett agreed as she had long been a fan of The Gits. The band renamed themselves Evil Stig (Gits Live backwards), and toured in early 1995 playing a mix of Gits and Joan Jett songs, with a majority of the profits going towards Zapata's murder investigation. A self-titled album was issued later in the year, again with a majority of the profits going towards the investigation. While touring and recording with Evil Stig, Spleen, Dresdner and Moriarty also continued playing with the Dancing French Liberals of '48.

Moriarty later appeared in the punk rock band St. Bushmill's Choir as well as the more acoustic based Pinkos. In January 2012 Moriarty conducted a comprehensive audio interview with Music Life Radio about his life and career with extensive references to The Gits.

== Discography ==
=== Albums ===
- Frenching the Bully (C/Z Records) (1992)

Reissued on Broken Rekids, 2003

- Enter: The Conquering Chicken (C/Z Records) (1994)

Reissued on Broken Rekids, 2003

=== Compilations ===
- Kings & Queens (Broken Rekids) (1996)
- Seafish Louisville (Broken Rekids) (2000)
- Best of The Gits (Liberation) (2008)

=== Singles ===
- "Precious Blood" b/w "Seaweed" and "Kings & Queens" (Big Flaming Ego Records) (1990)
- "Second Skin" b/w "Social Love" (Broken Rekids) (1991)
- "Spear and Magic Helmet" b/w "While You're Twisting, I'm Still Breathing" (Empty Records) (1991)

=== Appearances on compilations ===
- "Here's to Your Fuck" and "Ain't Got No Right" on Bobbing For Pavement: The Rathouse Compilation (Rathouse/Broken Rekids) (1991)
- "Drinking Song" on Power Flush: San Francisco, Seattle & You (Broken Rekids) (1993)
- "Guilt Within Your Head" and "Social Love (Live)" on Home Alive: The Art Of Self-Defense (Epic Records) (1996)
- "Second Skin (Live)" on Hype! The Motion Picture Soundtrack (Sub Pop Records) (1996)
- "Seaweed" on Cool Beans #13-Eviction Compilation (Cool Beans!/Broken Rekids) (2000)
- "Another Shot of Whiskey" on Wild and Wooly: The Northwest Rock Collection (Experience Music Project/Sub Pop Records) (2000)
- "Whirlwind" on Girls Kick Ass (Vitaminepillen) (2001)
- "Absynthe" on Whatever: The 90's Pop & Culture Box (Rhino/WEA) (2005)
- "Another Shot of Whiskey" on Sleepless in Seattle: The Birth of Grunge (LiveWire Recordings) (2006)
- "Second Skin" on Blood On The Flat Track: The Rise Of The Rat City Rollergirls CDr (2009) – Documentary soundtrack
- "Absynthe" on Teen Spirit (Mojo Presents 15 Noise-Filled Classics From The American Underground) (Mojo Magazine) (2019)

=== As Evil Stig ===
- Evil Stig (Blackheart Records) (1995)
