= Pokkiri Raja =

Pokkiri Raja or Pokiri Raja may refer to

- Pokiri Raja, a 1995 Telugu film
- Pokkiri Raja (1982 film), a 1982 Tamil film
- Pokkiri Raja (2010 film), a 2010 Malayalam film
- Pokkiri Raja (2016 film), a 2016 Tamil film

== See also ==
- Pokkiri (disambiguation)
  - Pokiri, a 2006 Indian Telugu-language action film
  - Pokkiri, a 2007 Indian Tamil-language action film
- Raja (disambiguation)
