= Arasan =

Arasan (film) may refer to:

- Arasan (film), upcoming Indian film
- Arasan (health complex), in Alma-Ata
- Arasanj (disambiguation), places in Iran
- Khoon Ka Karz, a Bollywood film, whose Tamil title is Arasan
- A font in the Armenian alphabet

== See also ==
- Arasu (disambiguation)
- Arsan (disambiguation)
