= Raja (disambiguation) =

Raja is an Indian term for a monarch, or princely ruler.

Raja may also refer to:

== Elephants ==
- Raja (elephant) (died 1988), a Sri Lankan tusker elephant belonging to Sri Dalada Maligawa
- Heiyantuduwa Raja (1924–2002), a privately owned Sri Lankan tusker elephant whose skeleton is now in display at the National Museum, Sri Lanka

== Arts and entertainment ==
- Raja (play), a 1910 play by Rabindranath Tagore
- Raja (1943 film), an Indian Hindi-language film Kishore Sahu
- Raja (1972 film), an Indian Tamil-language film starring Sivaji Ganesan
- Raaja, a 1975 Indian Hindi-language film starring Rishi Kapoor
- Raja (1995 film), an Indian Hindi-language film starring Sanjay Kapoor
- Raja (1999 film), an Indian Telugu-language film starring Venkatesh
- Raja (2002 film), an Indian Tamil-language film starring Ajith Kumar
- Raja (2003 film), a French/Moroccan film starring Pascal Greggory
- Raja 420 (2016 film), a Bangladeshi film starring Shakib Khan
- Raja, a 2019 Indian Bhojpuri-language film starring Pawan Singh
- Raja (album), a 2008 album by Stam1na
- Raja, a fictional character in the 1998 Indian film Dulhe Raja, portrayed by Govinda

== Places ==
- Raja, Jõgeva County, village in Kasepää Parish, Jõgeva County, Estonia
- Raja, Viljandi County, village in Halliste Parish, Viljandi County, Estonia
- Raga, South Sudan, also known as Raja, town and capital of Lol State
- Raga County, also known as Raja, in Western Bahr el Ghazal, South Sudan

== People ==
- Raja (name), a list of people with the given name and surname
- Raja (Tamil actor) (born 1965), an Indian film actor
- Raja (Telugu actor) (born 1978), an Indian film actor
- Raja Gemini (born 1974), American drag queen

== Sports ==
- El Raja SC, an Egyptian sports club
- Raja Casablanca, a Moroccan sports club

== Other uses ==
- Rāja yoga, one of the four major yogic paths of Hinduism
- Raja (fish), a genus of rays
- Raja (festival), an annual event in Odisha, India
- Rajas con crema, a Mexican ingredient of chiles and onions, used in many dishes
- The raja, a piece in the board game chaturanga

== See also ==
- Rai (surname)
- Raj (disambiguation)
- Rajah (disambiguation)
- Rajan (disambiguation)
- Raju (disambiguation)
- Reja (disambiguation)
- Rana (disambiguation)
- Rajasthan (disambiguation)
- Maharaja (disambiguation), title for Indian monarchs
- Rani (disambiguation), feminine counterpart of the title
- Arasu (disambiguation), alternative form of the title in some Indian languages
- Raja Rani (disambiguation)
- Rajas, a concept in Indian philosophy
- Rajiv, an Indian name
- Rajput, an Indian caste grouping
- Radja, an Indonesian rock band
- Heinrich Wladimir Mohamed Radja (1917–1976), an Indo-Surinamese entrepreneur and politician
