= Arsan =

Arsan is a name and may refer to:

- Emmanuelle Arsan, a Thai-French novelist
- Sünuhi Arsan, a Turkish judge
- Arsan Duolai, a Turkic god

== See also ==
- Arasan (disambiguation)
