= Raná =

Raná may refer to places in the Czech Republic:

- Raná (Chrudim District), a municipality and village in the Pardubice Region
- Raná (Louny District), a municipality and in the Ústí nad Labem Region
