= Ranee =

Ranee can be:

- an alternative spelling of the name Rani (Devnagari: रानी)
- HMS Ranee - a British escort carrier
- Ranee mouse, a rodent
- Flying Ranee, an Indian train
- Ranee Narah, an Indian politician

== See also ==
- Rani (disambiguation)
