= Raja Rani =

Raja Rani (lit. 'King and Queen' in Indic languages) may refer to:

== Places ==
- Raja Rani, Nepal, a village in the Dhankuta District of Nepal
- Raja Rani lake, a lake in the Morang District of Nepal
- Rajarani Temple, a temple in Bhubaneswar, Odisha, India

== Film and television ==
- Raja Rani (1942 film), a Hindi film
- Raja Rani (1956 film), a Tamil film
- Raja Rani (1973 film), a Hindi film
- Raja Rani (2013 film), a Tamil film
- Kanden Kadhalai, previously titled Raja Rani, a 2009 Tamil film
- Raja Rani (Tamil TV series), a 2017 Tamil soap opera
- Raja Rani (Kannada TV series), a 2021 Kannada television show

== See also ==
- Raja (disambiguation)
- Rani (disambiguation)
- King and Queen (disambiguation)
