= King and Queen =

King and Queen may refer to:

== Music ==
- King & Queen, album by Otis Redding and Carla Thomas
- "King and Queen" (song), a song by Beau Monga

== Places ==
- King and Queen County, Virginia
- King and Queen Court House, Virginia
- Concourse at Landmark Center in Atlanta, Georgia commonly nicknamed as the King and Queen towers

== Other uses ==
- King and Queen, Brighton, a pub in Brighton, United Kingdom
- King and Queen (sculpture), by Henry Moore
- King and Queen (Sorel Etrog sculpture), in Windsor Sculpture Park, Ontario

== See also ==
- Kings and Queens (disambiguation)
- King (disambiguation)
- Queen (disambiguation)
- Raja Rani (disambiguation)
- List of monarchs
