= Ranam =

Ranam may refer to these Indian films:

- Ranam (2006 film), a Telugu film
- Ranam (2018 film), a Malayalam film
- Ranam (2021 film), a Kannada film

== See also ==
- Ranam-guyok, a district of Chongjin, North Korea
- Ranam Aram Thavarel, a 2024 Indian Tamil-language mystery thriller film
- Rana (disambiguation)
