= Evil Stig =

Studio album by Evil Stig
- Released: 1995
- Genre: Punk rock
- Length: 36:49
- Label: Blackheart
- Producer: Kenny Laguna

Joan Jett chronology
Pure and Simple (1994)	Evil Stig (1995)	Fit to Be Tied (1997)

The Gits chronology
Enter: The Conquering Chicken (1994)	Evil Stig (1995)	Kings & Queens (1996)

Professional ratings
Review scores
Source	Rating
AllMusic	3/5 stars

Evil Stig is the only studio album by the American punk rock supergroup Evil Stig, formed by Joan Jett and the surviving members of The Gits. The album was released in 1995 through Blackheart Records and was recorded for a series of benefit concerts to fund the investigation into the 1993 murder of The Gits lead vocalist and lyricist Mia Zapata. The name Evil Stig is "Gits Live" in reverse.

== Track listing ==
All tracks composed by Andy Kessler, Matt Dresdner, Steve Moriarty, Mia Zapata; except where indicated

1. "Sign of the Crab" – 2:22
2. "Bob (Cousin O.)" – 2:53
3. "Drinking Song" – 2:47
4. "Spear and Magic Helmet" – 2:42
5. "Last to Know" (Jett, Dresdner, Moriarty, Kessler, Kenny Laguna, Jim Vallance) – 3:44
6. "Guilt Within Your Head" – 2:23
7. "Whirlwind" – 3:05
8. "Another Shot of Whiskey" – 2:37
9. "Second Skin" – 2:43
10. "Activity Grrrl" (Jett) – 3:28
11. "You Got a Problem" (Jett, Kathleen Hanna, Desmond Child) – 3:17
12. "Crimson & Clover" (Tommy James, Peter Lucia Jr.) – 3:05
13. "Drunks" – 7:50
- Tracks 10 and 11 were already recorded for Joan Jett's previous studio album, Pure and Simple (1994).
