= Kings & Queens (The Gits album) =

Studio album by The Gits
- Released: June 11, 1996
- Recorded: 1988
- Genre: Punk rock
- Label: Broken Rekids
- Producer: Ben London, The Gits

The Gits chronology
Evil Stig (1995)	Kings & Queens (1996)	Seafish Louisville (2000)

Kings & Queens is an album of early recordings by The Gits, recorded in 1988 and released in 1996 on Broken Rekids. The album was originally self-released by the band in 1988 under the name Private Lubs but did not receive an "official" release until 1996 when released under the Kings & Queens moniker. Several of the tracks that appear on this record were later re-recorded for The Gits debut album Frenching the Bully (1992).

== Track listing ==
1. "Eleven" – 4:01
2. "Cut My Skin, It Makes Me Human" – 2:31
3. "A" – 1:34
4. "Running" – 2:44
5. "Look Right Through Me" – 1:51
6. "It All Dies Anyway" – 4:27
7. "Monsters" – 3:01
8. "It Doesn't Matter" – 3:28
9. "Snivelling Little Rat Faced Git" – 1:05
10. "Still You Don't Know What It's Like" – 3:46
11. "Tempt Me" – 2:17
12. "Gitsrumental" – 1:45
13. "Kings and Queens" – 2:15
14. "Ain't Got No Right" – 2:38
15. "Loose" – 2:23
16. "Graveyard Blues" (Live) – 3:20
