= Vimto =

British soft drink

- 2021 logo on a grey background

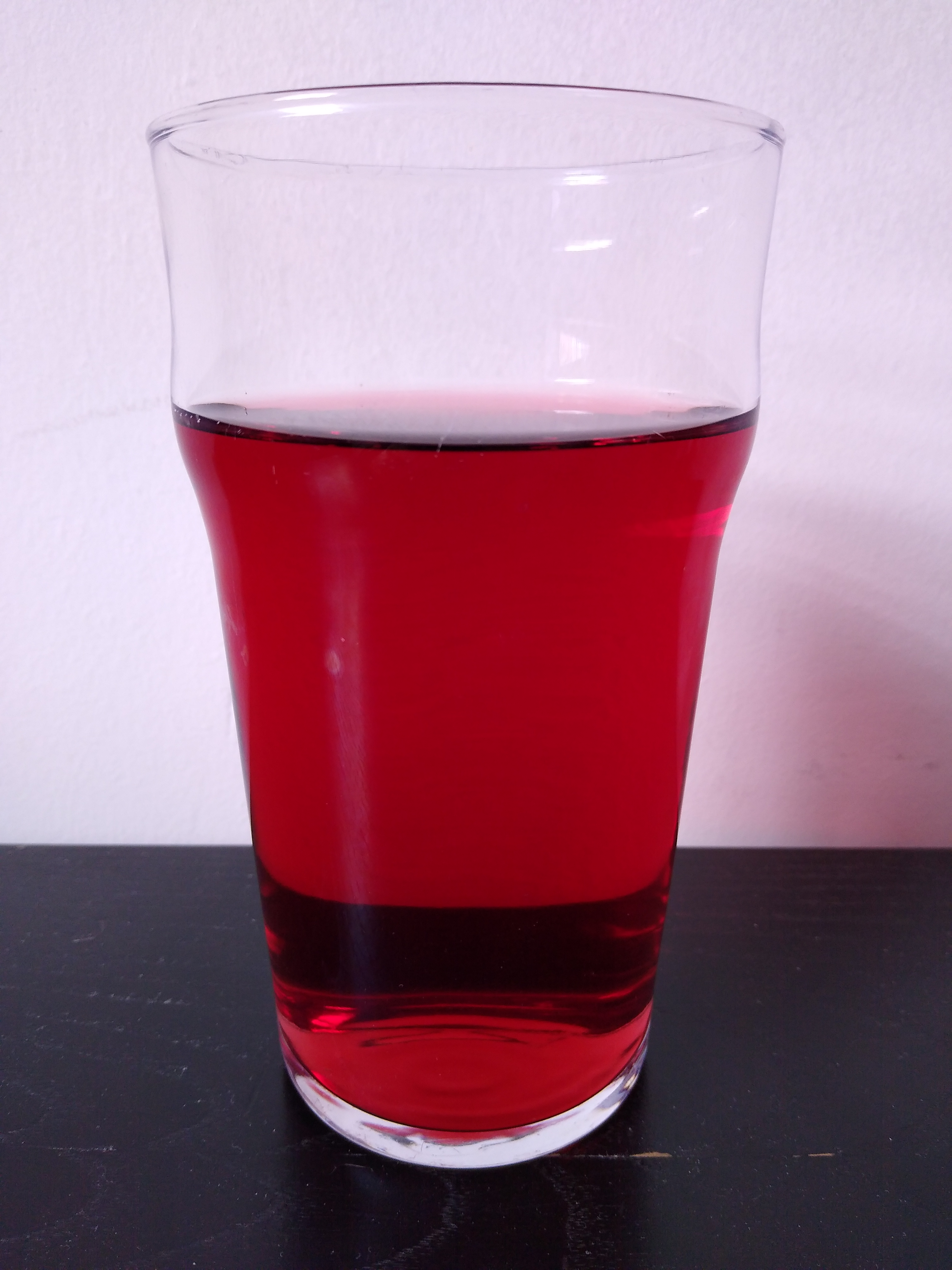
- A glass of Vimto
- Type: Soft drink
- Manufacturer: Nichols plc
- Distributor: Cabana
- Origin: England, Salford
- Introduced: 1908; 118 years ago
- Colour: Purple
- Flavour: Mixed fruits
- Website: vimto.co.uk

Vimto is a British mixed fruit soft drink containing the juice of grapes, raspberries, and blackcurrants, flavoured with herbs and spices. Originating in Salford, Northern England, the recipe was invented in 1908 by John Noel Nichols of Blackburn. It was first manufactured as a health tonic in cordial form, then decades later as a carbonated drink. Produced domestically by Nichols plc, it is available in cans and bottles in carbonated, still, cordial (squash), and energy forms and it has also been made into various sweets, an ice lolly and other items. Vimto is traditionally most popular in the north of England and is also sold globally under licence, and enjoys high popularity in the Persian Gulf Arab states, North Africa, Somalia and in The Gambia and Senegal.

== History ==
Vimto was created in 1908 in Manchester by John Noel Nichols (1883–1966), a wholesaler of herbs, spices and medicines. He saw the market opening for soft drinks due to the temperance movement and the passage of the Licensing Act 1904. It was originally sold under the name Vim Tonic (vim meaning 'vigour'), which Nichols shortened to 'Vimto' in 1912. Vimto was originally registered as a health tonic or medicine, which was then re-registered in 1913 as a cordial. The concoction formula is a guarded trade secret with only 4 people appointed in keeping the recipe.

In 1910, production moved to a warehouse at Chapel Street, Salford, then to Old Trafford in 1927, and in 1971, to a state-of-the-art plant in Wythenshawe, Manchester. In 1999, the company's head office moved to Newton-le-Willows in St Helens, Merseyside.

From the 1990s to 2003, Vimto print advertisements used the cartoon character Purple Ronnie, along with slightly rude poems by Giles Andreae, the creator of Purple Ronnie. In 2003, Purple Ronnie was dropped, and a new creative direction was adopted, revolving around the benefits of 'Shlurpling the Purple'. This, in turn, led to the launch in 2006 of Billy and his Dad's Pants–a modern-day morality story in which, despite turning up at the swimming pool with his Dad's pants in the middle of his rolled-up towel, Billy wins out with ingenuity and humour. The theme tune 'Dad's Pants' become something of a cult classic, and was based on Loudon Wainwright III's 1972 novelty song "Dead Skunk".

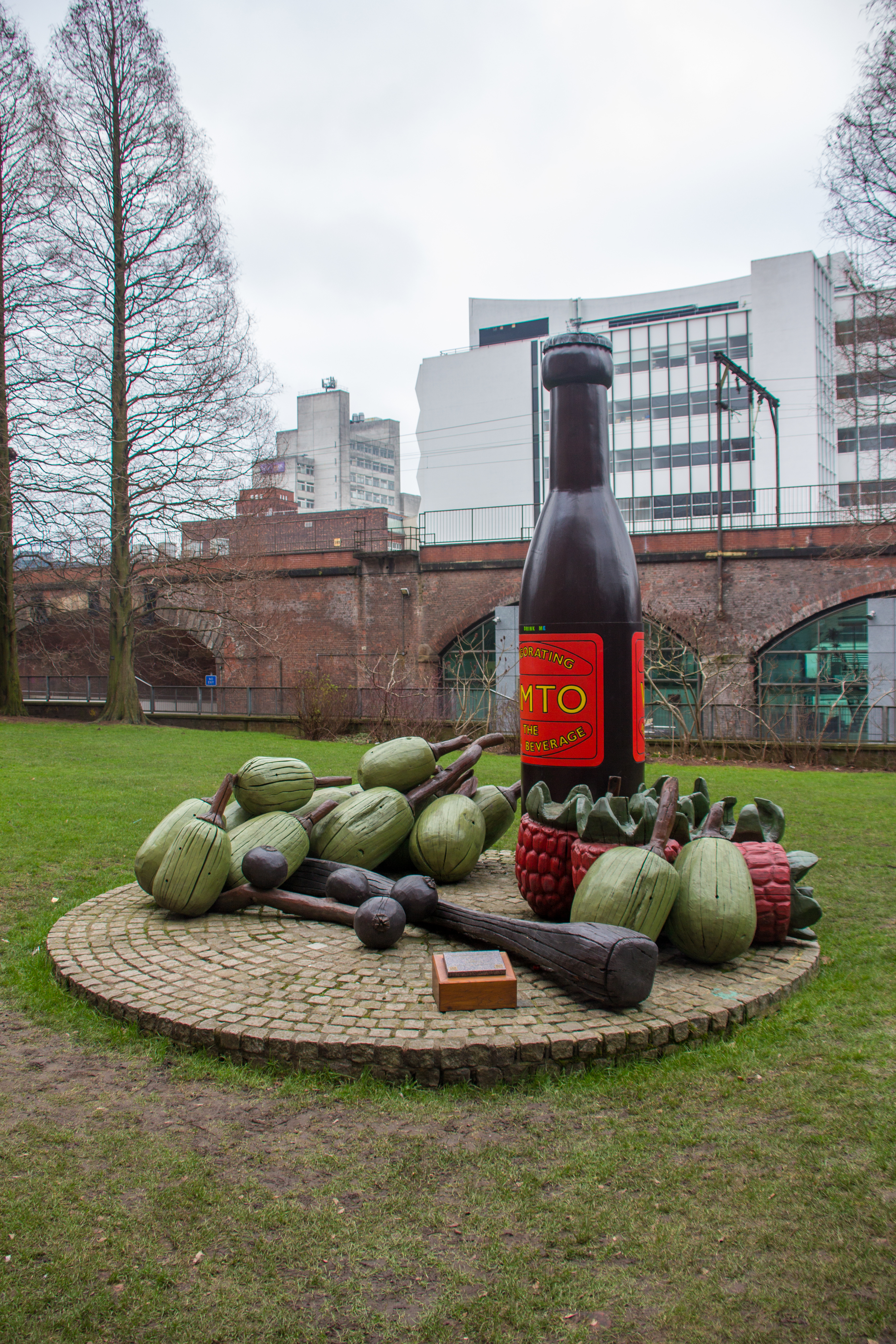
Vimto monument on Granby Row at the University of Manchester

An oak sculpture entitled "A Monument to Vimto" was created by Kerry Morrison and installed on Granby Row–the location of the original Vimto premises–in central Manchester in 1992. The statue was restored and repainted in 2011.

In 2021 Vimto introduced a new logo design across the range.

== Manufacture ==
Vimto is currently produced by Refresco (formerly Cott Corporation) in both Leicestershire and Lancashire on behalf of Vimto Soft Drinks, a division of Nichols plc. Nichols moved out of manufacturing in 2003 when it closed its final production site in Golborne, Wigan.

Vimto is also manufactured under licence in Saudi Arabia, Yemen, The Gambia, and Ghana. A Sunday Times article in 2007 claimed it to be the most popular drink during the holy month of Ramadan in some Arab countries. The drink in its original incarnation is still maintained as a health tonic among West Africans and is marketed as such there.

The drink was also made under licence in the United Kingdom by A.G. Barr in 1996.

In 2014, the recipe for Fizzy Vimto was changed to include artificial sweeteners, Acesulfame K and Sucralose.

Ellis Wilkinson Mineral Water facilitated the production of drinks for Vimto in their early days of trading.

=== Company ===
A subsidiary of Nichols plc, Cabana is the distribution arm of the company, and operates via a UK-wide network of distributors that are, in the main, independent. In Scotland and Sussex, the distributor is a wholly owned subsidiary of Cabana (Scotland–Cariel, and Sussex–Beacon Drinks now closed).

Vimto is currently available in 65 countries and the number of countries in which it is on sale is growing.

=== Recalls ===
On 5 April 2024, Nichols plc recalled 500ml bottles of Vimto due to a packaging error. The bottles stated there was no added sugar, but the bottles actually contained sugar.

== Variations (UK market) ==
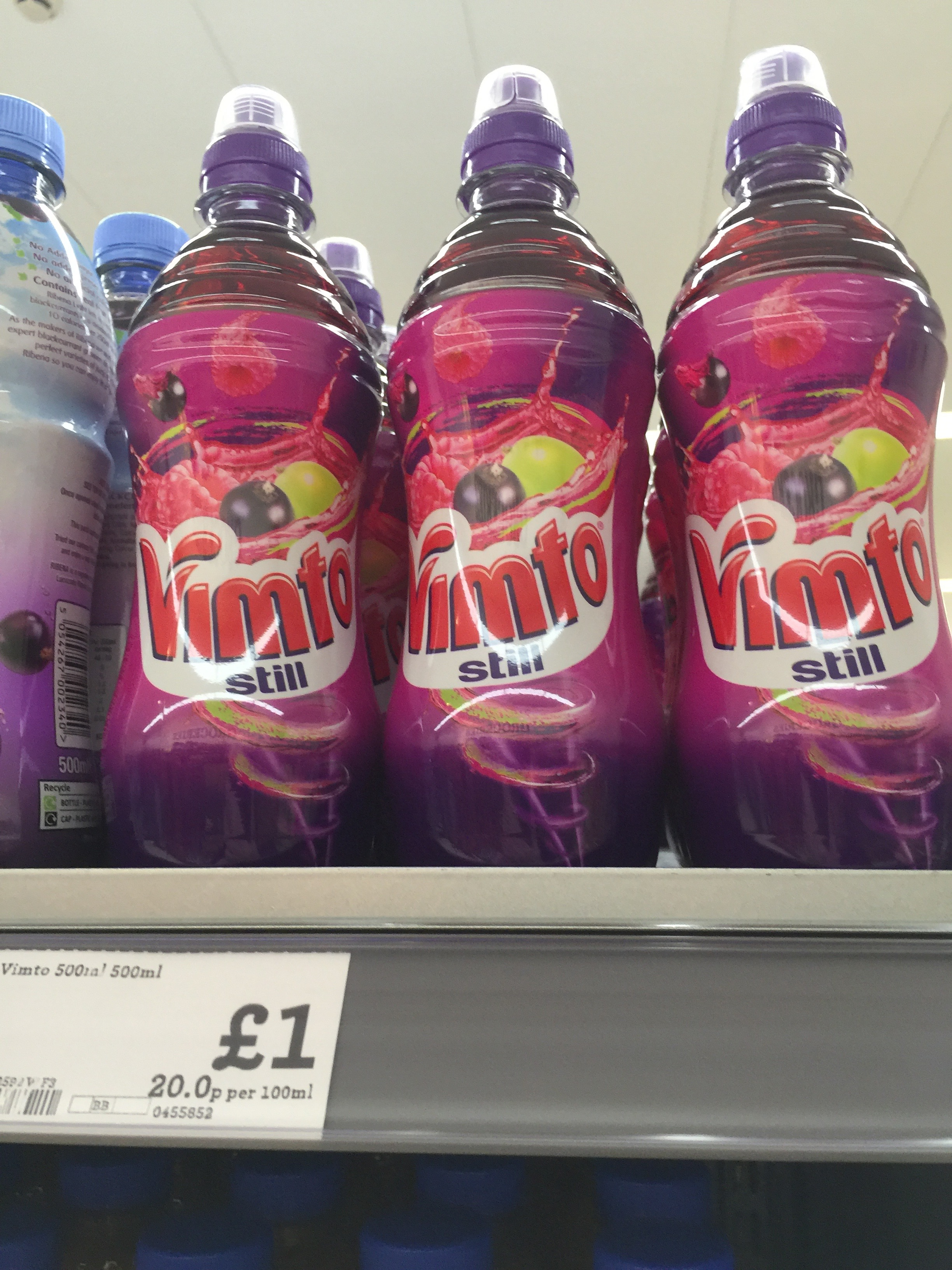
Vimto still bottles for sale in 2016

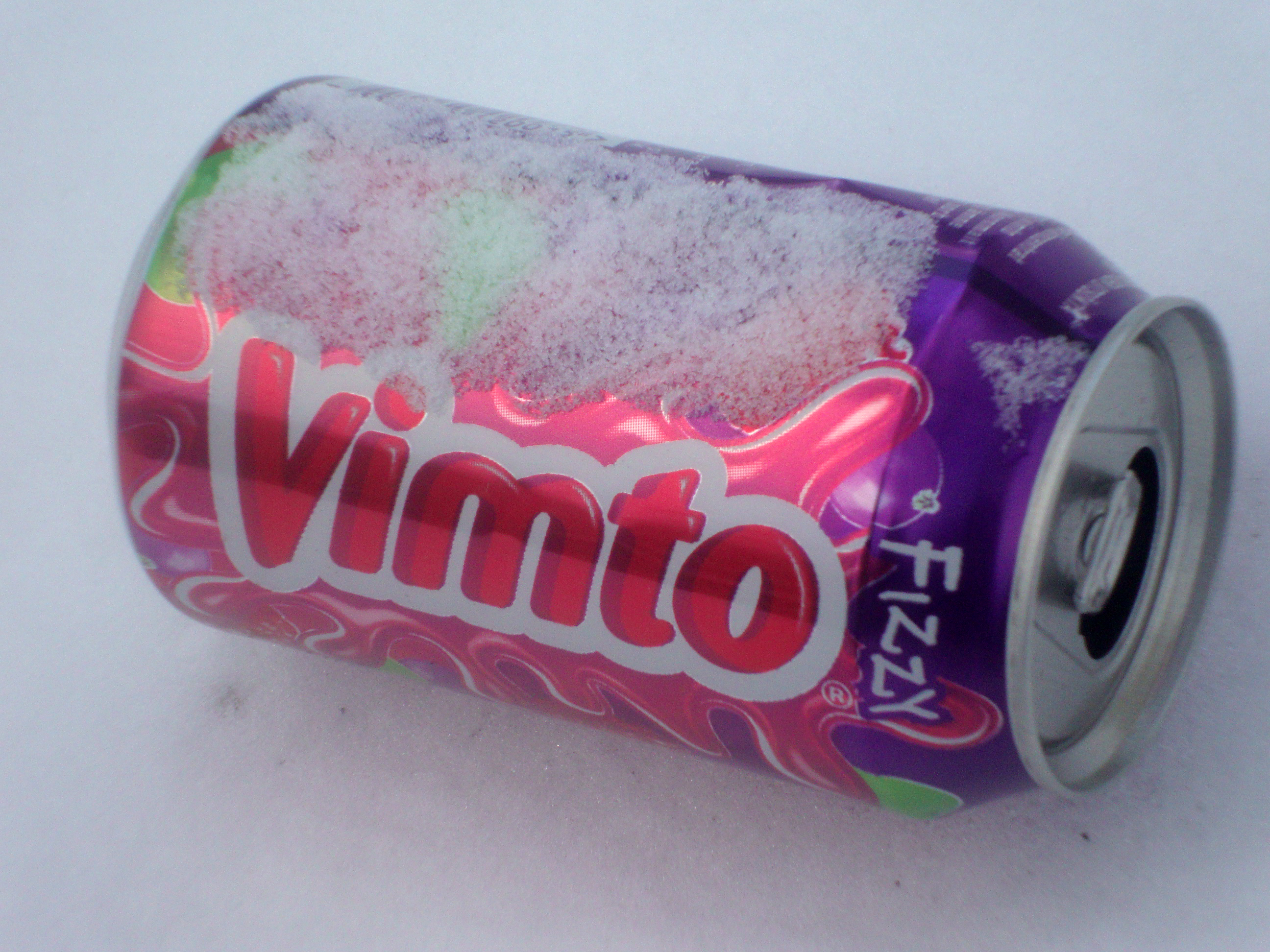
Fizzy Vimto can, circa 2011

A dilutable version ("Vimto Cordial"), a still, premixed version, and a carbonated mixed version ("Fizzy Vimto") are all available in the UK. While Vimto has its origins in Northern England, it can now be found both nationally and internationally. The cordial version is more widely sold and is available in concentrate and ready-to-drink varieties. The cordial version was widely known for being suitable for vegans until Vimto added vitamin D, which is derived from sheep's wool, in April 2021.

Vimto is also available in a slush variety alongside many other different Vimto confectionery products, such as Vimto bars, lollipops, Rip Rolls, candy sprays, and Jelly Babies. Vimto is also available in the form of an energy drink, Vimto Energy, made with natural caffeine and real fruit juice. Vimto is also available in a summer flavour, containing ingredients such as orange and apple, both of which are cordial products. Vimto was the UK's fastest-growing soft drinks brand by value in 2006 (as measured by NielsenIQ). An alcoholic cocktail known as the Cheeky Vimto or "Crazy Vimto" is also drunk in the UK. However, Vimto is not an ingredient of this beverage, and the name comes from its resemblance to the original product; instead, it contains port and Blue WKD. There is also a variant of this cocktail called "Dirty Vimto" that replaces the port with Buckfast Tonic Wine.

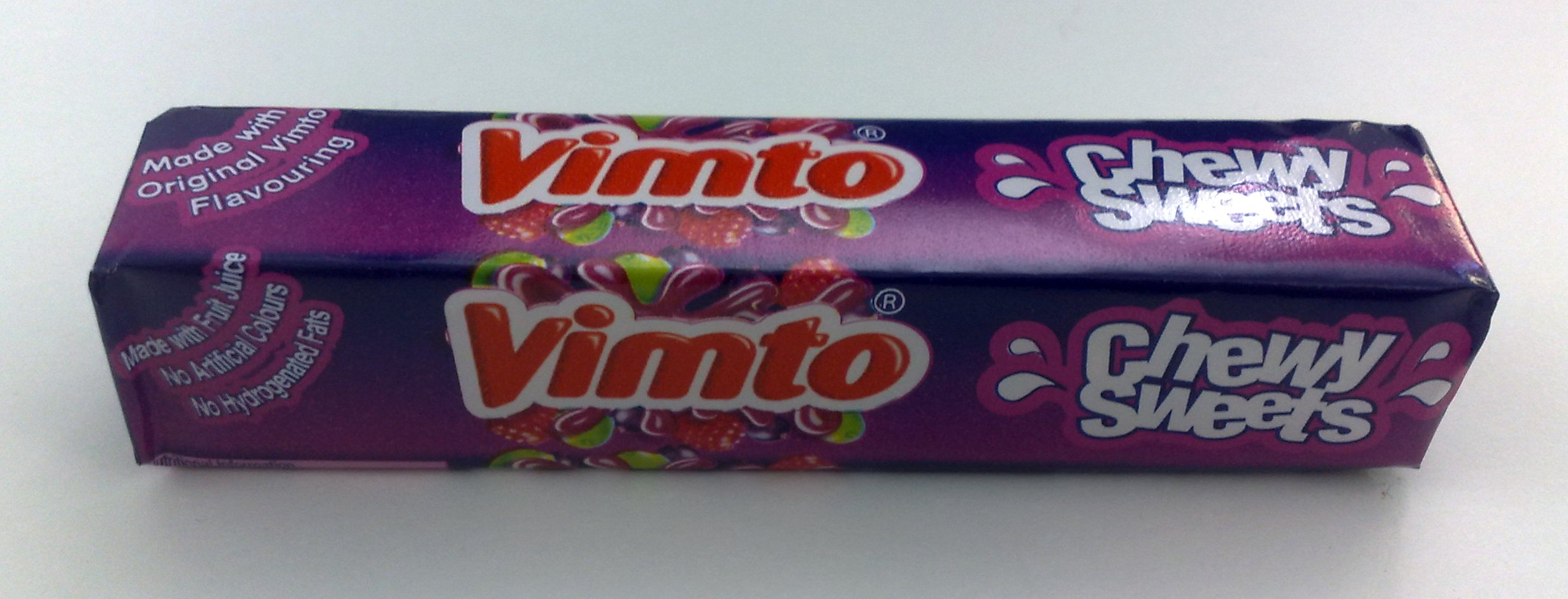
Vimto flavoured chewy sweets

Vimto is also often made as a hot beverage by simply adding boiling water to the concentrate, and is popular in this form throughout the north of England. Vimto is often made with hot water, especially during the winter months. It is also taken to sporting events in vacuum flasks by spectators as a warming drink to fend off the winter chill.

Alternatively-flavoured variants of Vimto were introduced over the years; cherry- and strawberry-flavoured variants, known as "Cherry Vimto" and "Strawberry Vimto", have become part of the range. In 2016, "Vimto Remix", was introduced. This range consists of various alternate flavour mixes that were introduced each year – mango, strawberry and pineapple in 2016, raspberry, orange, and passion fruit in 2017, watermelon, strawberry, and peach in 2018 and strawberry, orange and lime in 2019. The "Remix" name was eventually dropped after the drink was rebranded in 2021, while new flavour mixes continue to be introduced.

Homemade variations include a Vimto Milkshake made by adding milk instead of water to the cordial, and a Vimto Milkshake Special involving the same with vanilla ice-cream added. In June 2023, Vimto launched an energy drink, called Vimto Energy. It is currently available as a normal version with sugar and a sugar free (zero) version.

== Foreign markets ==
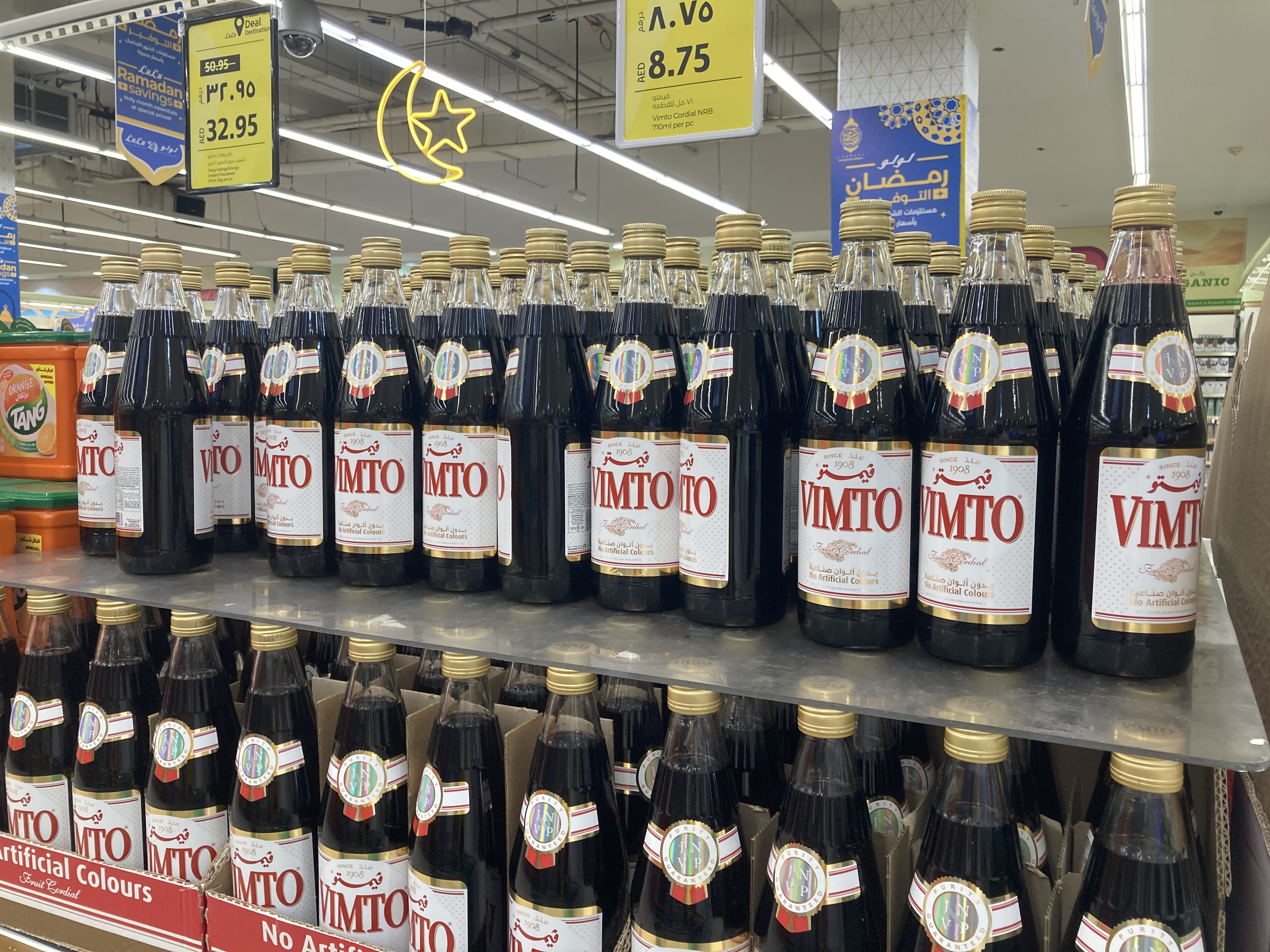
Glass bottles of Vimto for sale in the United Arab Emirates

In the Arabian Peninsula, Vimto (Arabic: ڤيمتو) has had over 80 years of dominance as the beverage of choice for the iftar or sunset feast during the Islamic holy fasting month of Ramadan. As of 2013, Aujan, the local bottler in Saudi Arabia, has been producing over 20 million bottles per year for the GCC market.

An article in The Sunday Times mentioned some 15 million bottles were sold during the one-month season in 2007.

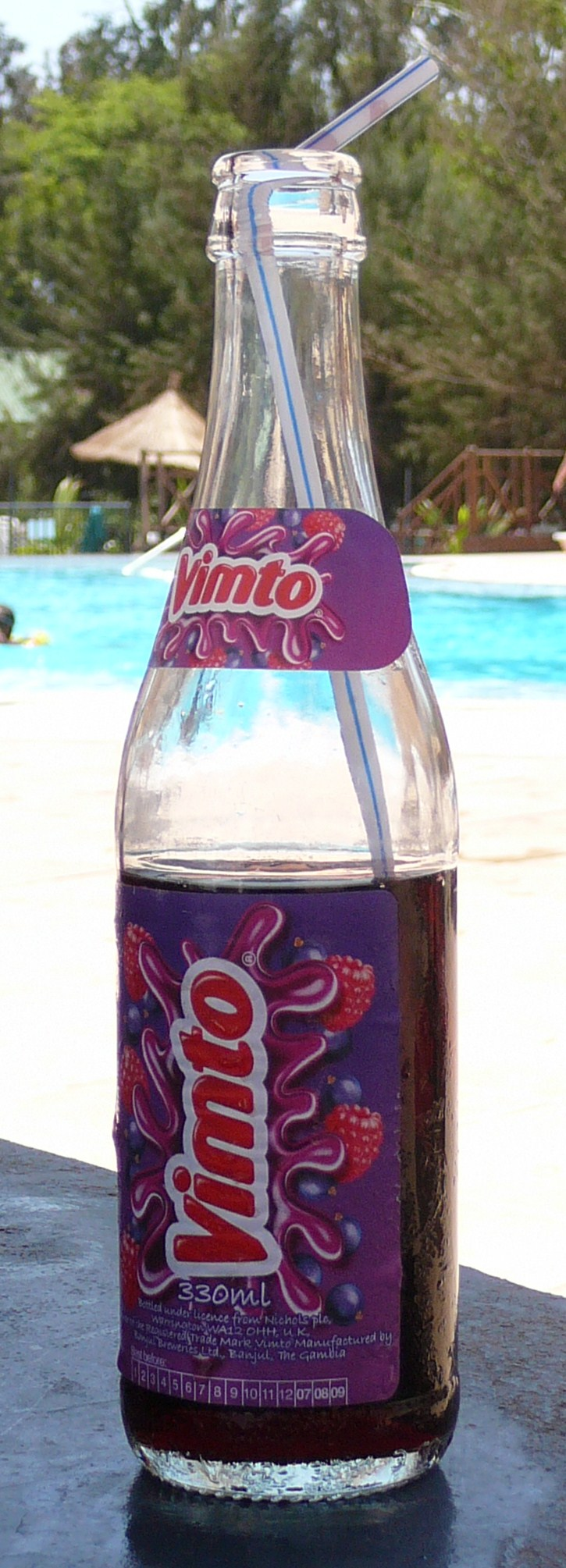
A bottled Vimto produced locally for the Gambian market

In Saudi Arabia, Vimto is manufactured under licence by the Aujan Industrial Company and has a 90% market share in the cordial concentrated drinks market. Every year, the company launches aggressive marketing campaigns on Arab satellite TV channels that in recent years have become very popular, and achieved cult status with viral marketing videos exchanged on the Internet.

Vimto was introduced in India in 1924 during the colonial period. Vimto was introduced to The Gambia and Senegal in the 1980s, where it remains popular.

In 2011, Vimto once again became widely available throughout the Republic of Ireland, through Tesco and the local version of Iceland shops.

In Pakistan, Vimto is produced under licence by Mehran Bottlers.

In Nepal, Vimto is manufactured under licence by Himganga Beverage Pvt Ltd.

In Cyprus, Vimto is manufactured under licence by Kean.

In Ghana, Vimto is manufactured under licence by Coca-Cola Bottling Company of Ghana Ltd.

It officially broke into the Malaysian market in 2024; though Malaysian consumers have already been acquainted with the brand years prior through the Middle Eastern version in specialty stores (kedai Arab) unofficially provided by AM Avenue Trading, also a local distributor of Barbican.

== Logos ==
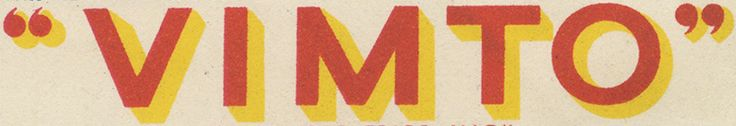
A variant of the vintage Vimto logo that was used earlier in the 20th century

Vintage Vimto logo that was used until the 1980s

Older Vimto logo until 2014 (in UK and Ireland)

Current logo since 2021 (in UK and Ireland)

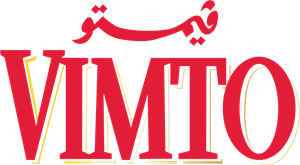
Current Vimto logo for the Arab market

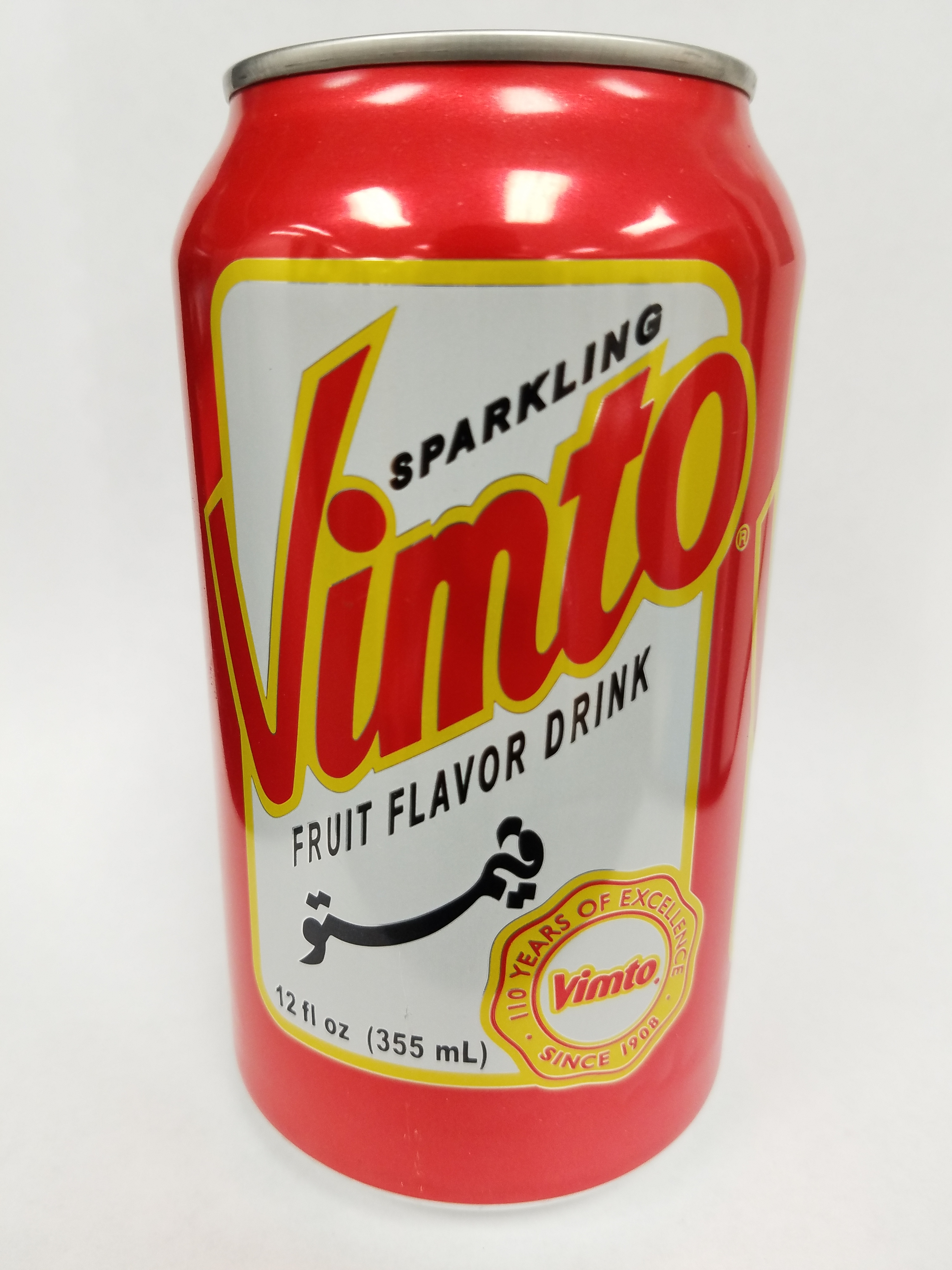
Old style Vimto logo still produced on some products internationally

== See also ==
- Ribena
- Sosyo
