= Maharaja (disambiguation) =

Maharaja is a Sanskrit title for a "great king" or "high king".

Maharaja or maharaj may also refer to:

- Maharaja (1998 film), an Indian Hindi-language film
- Maharaja (2005 film), an Indian Kannada-language film
- Maharaja (2011 film), an Indian Tamil-language film
- Maharaja (2024 film), an Indian Tamil-language film
- Maharaj (2024 film), an Indian Hindi-language film
- Sourav Ganguly, Indian cricketer, nicknamed "Maharaja"
- Maharaja (game), a 1994 board game
- Maharaja: The Game of Palace Building in India, a game designed by Wolfgang Kramer
- Maharaja Lela (ship), a frigate in the Malaysian Maharaja Lela-class

== See also ==
- Maraj, a surname of Indian origin, alternative form of Maharaja
- Maharaj Ji (disambiguation)
- Maharajan (disambiguation)
- Raja (disambiguation)
- High King (disambiguation), literal translation of maharaja
- Maharani (disambiguation)
- Maharajganj (disambiguation)
- Maharajpur (disambiguation)
