= Maharani (disambiguation) =

Maharani is an Indian title for queens and female rulers.

Maharani may also refer to:

- Maharani (2023 film), an Indian Malayalam-language film by G. Marthandan
- Maharani (2025 film), a Gujarati family drama
- Maharani (2009 TV series), 2009 Indian Tamil-language TV series
- Maharani (2021 TV series), 2021 Indian Hindi-language political TV series on SonyLIV
- Maharani (Telugu TV show), Indian Telugu-language TV series on Zee Telugu
- Maharani (album), by Nikki Palikat, 2005
- Maharani (song), 2023 Filipino pop song

== See also ==
- Maharaja (disambiguation)
- Rani (disambiguation)
