= Rajasthani =

Rajasthani may refer to:

- something of, from, or related to Rajasthan, a state of India
- Rajasthani languages, a group of Indic languages spoken there
- Rajasthani people, the native inhabitants of the state
- Rajasthani architecture, Indian architecture as practiced in the state
- Rajasthani art, arts of the Indian state
- Rajasthani cuisine, part of Indian cuisine
- Rajasthani literature, literature written in various genres starting from 1000 AD
- Rajasthani music, folk, classical and other forms of music from the Indian state
- Rajasthani painting, a style of Indian miniature painting from the royal courts of the state
- Cinema of Rajasthan, Rajasthani-language cinema

== See also ==
- Rajasthan (disambiguation)
