= Nichols plc =

British soft drink company

Nichols Plc

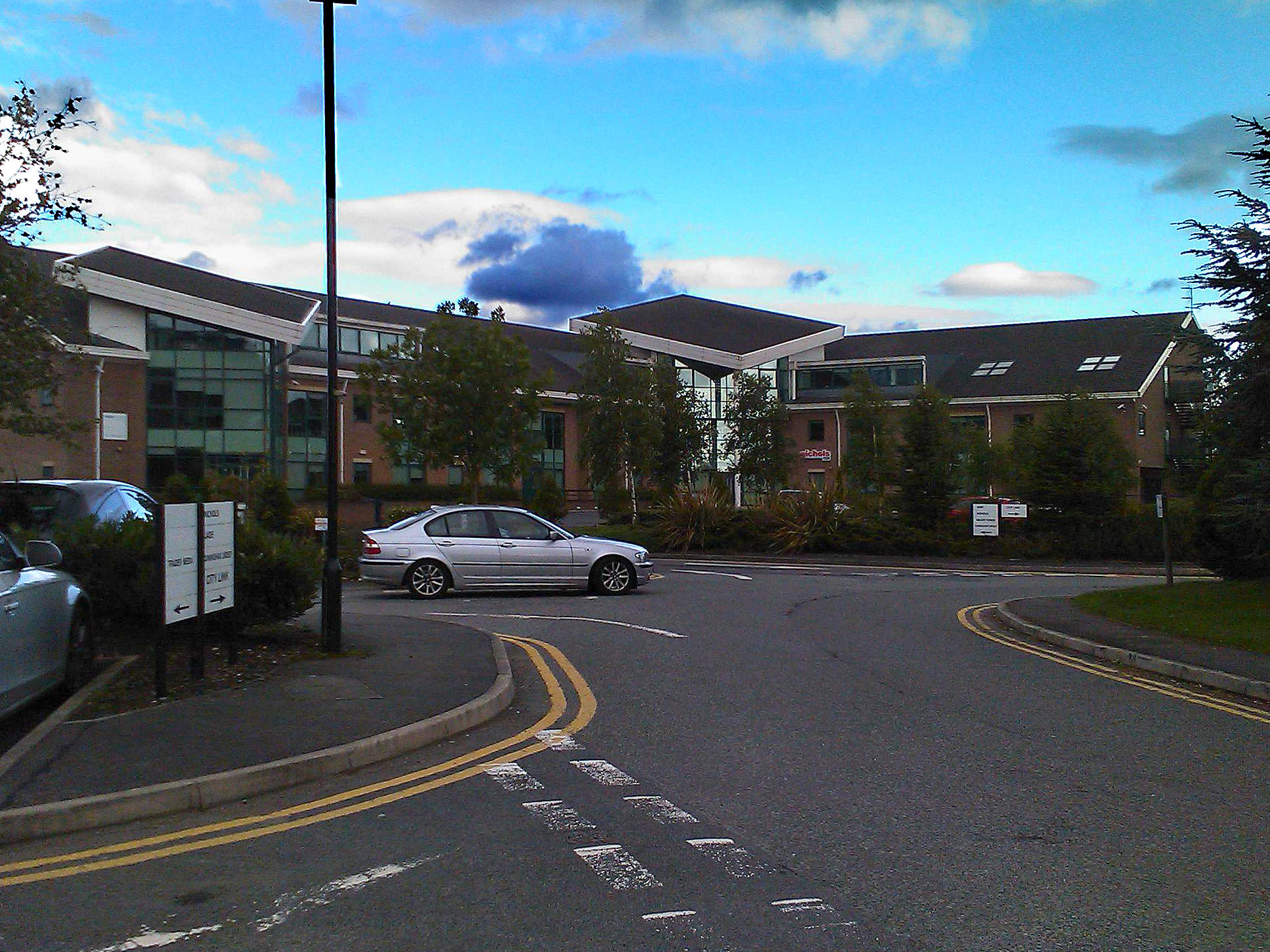
- Headquarters in St Helens, Merseyside
- Formerly: J N Nichols (Vimto) Public Limited Company (1929–2000)
- Company type: Public
- Traded as: AIM: NICL
- Website: nicholsplc.co.uk

Nichols plc, based in Newton-le-Willows, Merseyside, England, is a British company mainly known as the producer of Vimto, a fruit flavoured cordial. The company can trace its roots back to the invention of Vimto by John Noel Nichols in 1908. The company operates two types of business: the sale of Vimto and other brands (such as Panda Pops, which Nichols acquired from Hall & Woodhouse in 2005) via supermarkets and associated outlets, and a soft drink dispensing operation in the UK. The soft drink operation is handled under the name of Cabana and is the UK's largest independent supplier of dispensed soft drinks. The success of the Vimto soft drink caused Nichols plc to begin selling Vimto chews and Vimto chew bars.
