= Pokkiri (disambiguation) =

Pokkiri refers to two Indian films:

- Pokiri, 2006 Telugu film
- Pokkiri, 2007 Tamil film

== See also ==
- Pokkiri Raja (disambiguation)
