= Rajasthan (disambiguation) =

Rajasthan is a state in western India.

Rajasthan may also refer to:

- United State of Rajasthan, former name of Rajasthan
- Rajasthan (film), 1999 Indian Tamil-language film by R. K. Selvamani
- Annals and Antiquities of Rajasthan, history book about Rajasthan by James Tod
- Rajasthan Circuit, a Hindi film distribution circuit in Rajasthan

== See also ==
- Rajasthani (disambiguation)
- Raja (disambiguation), title for Indian kings
- Raj (disambiguation)
- Stan (disambiguation)
  - -stan, place name suffix
- Thana (disambiguation)
- Rajputana, grouping of various Indian princely states in western India, a division of the British Indian Empire
  - Rajputana Agency, the British Indian political division, precursor of the Indian state
  - Rajputana–Malwa Railway, former railway line in India
  - Rajputana famine of 1869, famine during British rule in India
- Rajputana Rifles, rifle regiment of the Indian Army
- Rajput, an Indian caste grouping
- Rajasthan cricket team, Indian domestic cricket team
- Rajasthan Royals, Jaipur-based franchisee of the Indian Premier League
