= Arasu =

Arasu (lit. 'raja, king') may refer to:

- Arasu (2003 film), an Indian Tamil film
- Arasu (2007 film), an Indian Kannada film

== See also ==
- Arasan (disambiguation)
- Raja (disambiguation)
