= Maharajpur =

Maharajpur may refer to:

- Maharajpur, Madhya Pradesh, a town in Madhya Pradesh, India
  - Maharajpur, Madhya Pradesh Assembly constituency, the assembly constituency encompassing the town
  - Maharajpur Air Force Station
- Maharajpur, Kanpur, a town in Uttar Pradesh, India
  - Maharajpur, Uttar Pradesh Assembly constituency, the assembly constituency encompassing the town
- Maharajpur, Unnao, a village in Uttar Pradesh, India
- Maharajpur railway station, in Jharkhand, India
- Mewla–Maharajpur Assembly constituency, Haryana Legislative Assembly (defunct)
  - Mewla Maharajpur metro station, of the Delhi Metro

== See also ==
- Maharaja (disambiguation)
- Pur (disambiguation)
