= Second Skin (song) =

Single by the Gits

from the album Frenching the Bully
- B-side: "Social Love"
- Released: 1991
- Recorded: 1991
- Genre: Punk rock
- Label: Broken Rekids
- Songwriter: The Gits

The Gits singles chronology
"Precious Blood" (1990)	"Second Skin" (1991)	"Spear And Magic Helmet" (1991)

"Second Skin" is the second single by American punk rock band the Gits. The record was released as a limited edition 7-inch single by the San Francisco-based Broken Rekids Records who would later handle all of the band's discography. Included in the track listing were early versions of "Second Skin" (later included on the Frenching the Bully album) and "Social Love" (later re-recorded for the Enter: The Conquering Chicken album).

== Track listing ==
1. "Second Skin"
2. "Social Love"
