= Ranni =

Ranni may refer to:

- Ranni, Kerala, a village and taluka in Kerala, India.
  - Ranni (State Assembly constituency)
- Rodolfo Ranni (born 1937), Italian-Argentine actor
- Ranni the Witch, a character in the video game Elden Ring

== See also ==
- Rani (disambiguation)
- Rannís
