= Maharajan =

Maharajan may refer to:

- Maharaja, an Indian royal title
- Maharajan, also known as MHRJ, a Japanese singer-songwriter.
- A. Maharajan, an Indian politician
- N. Maharajan, an Indian film director
- T. L. Maharajan, a Tamil-language Indian musician

== See also ==
- Maharaja (disambiguation)
