= Aujan Group =

Saudi conglomerate

Aujan Group Holding
- Formerly: Abdulla Aujan & Brothers
- Company type: Holding company
- Founded: 1905; 121 years ago in Bahrain
- Founder: Abdulla Aujan
- Headquarters: Dammam, Saudi Arabia
- Products: Beverages, safety equipment
- Brands: Rani; Barbican
- Services: Hotels, resorts, game reserves, real estate development
- Divisions: FMCG; Hospitality & Real Estate; Packaging Materials; Other Investments
- Subsidiaries: Rani Refreshments; Aujan Coca-Cola Beverages Company (ACCBC); Aujan Crestwood Wood Works; Aujan Industrial Supplies; Rani International Development
- Website: aujan.com

Aujan Group Holding (AGH), formerly Abdulla Aujan & Brothers, is a Saudi conglomerate which has interests in manufacturing and distribution, real estate, hospitality, mining, and trading. It is headquartered in Dammam, Saudi Arabia, the company operates in more than 70 countries primarily in the Middle East and Africa.

== History ==
Abdulla Aujan & Brothers was founded in Bahrain in 1905 by Abdulla Aujan and three of his brothers. The company traded commodities such as tobacco and rice. Aujan entered the beverages industry in 1928, when it secured the exclusive license to distribute Vimto in the Middle East.

Abdulla Aujan's nephew, Adel Abdul Rahman Aujan, joined the company in 1968, after graduating from Fort Lewis College in Colorado, US Adel expanded the company's beverage sales and distribution networks beyond Saudi Arabia. He also played a role in developing Vimto Carbonated, a fizzy version of the original drink. Adel Aujan died in January 2017.

== Beverages ==
Aujan entered the beverages industry in 1928, when it secured the exclusive license to distribute Vimto in the Middle East. The company established its first beverage manufacturing plant in 1979 at Dammam, Saudi Arabia. The company introduced Rani Orange Float, its first homegrown beverage, in 1982. Aujan Industries began importing Barbican from U.K.-based Bass Beers for sale in the Middle East in 1983. Alongside the Swiss-made beverage Moussy, Barbican was the first non-alcoholic malt beverage to be sold in the region. Manufacturing changes at Bass Beers disrupted supplies of Barbican to Aujan, and in 1999, Aujan purchased the Barbican brand in select markets. Aujan acquired complete control of Barbican in 2010, and began manufacturing the beverage at the company's factory in Dubai. Aujan established a second beverage manufacturing plant in 2005 at Dubai, UAE.

On 14 December 2011, the Coca-Cola acquired a 50% stake in Aujan's beverages business for $980 million. Coca-Cola acquired a 50% stake in Aujan's brands, and a 49% stake in its bottling and distribution company. Aujan retains control of the Vimto license, and also its manufacturing and distribution operations in Iran. The deal was completed on 24 September 2012.

Following the deal, the two companies established Aujan Coca-Cola Beverages Company (ACCBC) and Rani Refreshments in 2012. Rani Refreshments holds the global brand rights for Aujan's original brands such as Rani and Barbican. Both companies are headquartered in Dubai. ACCBC will serve as the manufacturer and distributor of the brands owned by Rani Refreshments and the Coca-Cola Company, as well as Vimto under license. Mirroring the system used by Coca-Cola and its global bottling partners, Rani Refreshments will supply ACCBC with proprietary concentrate and the latter will produce and distribute the beverages.

Coca-Cola and Aujan held a ceremony in Dubai in March 2013 to mark the one billionth can of Rani produced by ACCBC. In July 2014, ACCBC announced that it had completed a deal to acquire an 80% stake in the National Beverage Company, the manufacturer and distributor of Coca-Cola and Pampa products in Lebanon, for an undisclosed sum. As a result, the National Beverage Company's manufacturing plant in Beirut, Lebanon became Aujan's fourth beverage manufacturing plant.

=== Rani juice ===
Rani
- Type: Juice
- Manufacturer: Aujan Coca-Cola Beverages Company (ACCBC), The Coca-Cola Company
- Origin: Dammam, Saudi Arabia
- Introduced: 1982
- Variants: Rani Fruit Drink; Rani Float; Rani Refresh
- Related products: Barbican
- Website: www.raniworld.com

Rani is a brand of fruit-based juice beverages manufactured by ACCBC and primarily sold in the Middle East. The company introduced Rani Orange Float in 1982. The beverage was inspired by a mandarin drink that Aujan Industries Chairman Adel Aujan had tasted during a trip to Japan. Rani was Aujan's first homegrown beverage brand. Rani accounted for 84% of Aujan's sales in 2011.

==== Branding of Rani ====
Rani was part of Aujan Industries from 1982 to 2012. On 2012, The Coca-Cola Company and the Aujan Industries made a partnership which resulted in the formation of ACCBC.

==== Manufacturing of Rani ====
Rani is a fruit juice drink. There are three kinds of rani that are:

- Rani Float
- Rani Fruit Drink
- Rani Refreshing

Rani Float uses real fruit pieces, also known as 'Chunks'. Rani Juice has Vitamin C and other things like protein and calcium. Rani is currently available in cans, glass bottles, pet bottles and fiber brick.

== Hospitality and Real Estate ==
In 1996, Adel Aujan established the Stanley & Livingstone private game reserve in Victoria Falls, Zimbabwe. The 8,000 acre reserve is home to 25 different species of large game, a rhino-breeding program and an anti-poaching academy.

Aujan established the Indigo Bay Resorts on Bazaruto Island, Mozambique in 2001, and the Pemba Beach Hotel & Spa in Pemba, Mozambique in 2002. In 2013, Aujan entered into a partnerships with hotel chain Minor Hotel Group. The same year, Aujan acquired the Radisson Blu in Maputo, Mozambique from the Carlson Rezidor Hotel Group. The company partnered with Oberoi Hotels & Resorts to develop and operate an Oberoi hotel in Dubai. The hotel opened in June 2013. In November 2015, Aujan opened a new multi-use towers development in Maputo.

== Other businesses ==
Aujan Crestwood Wood Works, a manufacturer of upscale kitchen cabinets, bathroom vanities, bedroom closets and custom millwork, was established in Saudi Arabia in 1974.

Aujan Group Holding established Aujan Industrial Supplies, a joint venture with Cayan Ventures, in 1981. AIS provides safety equipment and services in Saudi Arabia. AIS also distributes products and services from international brands such as MSA, Honeywell, 3M, and Brady.
