= Reja (disambiguation) =

Reja is a decorative iron screen.

Reja may also refer to:

- Matic Reja, a Slovenian footballer
- Edoardo Reja, Italian football coach and former player

== See also ==
- Raja (disambiguation)
