= Arasan (health complex) =

Arasan health complex
- Interactive map of Arasan health complex

General information
- Location: Almaty, Kazakhstan
- Coordinates: 43°18′N 76°54′E
- Completed: 1982

Arasan (translated from Kazakh - a warm source) is a health-improving complex in Almaty.

== Baths of Almaty ==
Before the October Revolution, two city baths functioned in Verny (Almaty's name at the time). Officially they were called: "The Titov Brothers' Trade National Baths" and "Zhilenkov's Bath". Almost the entire urban population of Verny washed in city baths. However, their condition did not meet sanitary standards.

In the Kazakh Soviet Socialist Republic, the problem with baths was very serious, as evidenced by the order No. 44 of the Semirechye Regional Revolutionary Committee "On providing the population of the Turkestan Republic with baths" issued in April 1921.

In 1926, in the city on Fontannaya Street (now Abai Ave.), a bathhouse was built - No. 1 (Fontannaya St., 54), which had 12 separate rooms (two of them with a bath) and two common bath rooms for 33 people each. In 1933 - bath number 2 (Oktyabrskaya st., 21). In 1935 a bathhouse was built on Gogolevskaya street (Gogol street).

In the 1950s, there were 5 baths with 703 beds in the city.

After the city overcame the population of 1 million people, the norms for the provision of baths were not observed by a factor of two (1.6 versus 3.0 places per 1000 inhabitants).

== Wellness complex ==
One of the requirements for the project of the health-improving complex was its architectural uniqueness. This was due to the socialist competition between the Kazakh SSR and the Uzbek SSR. In 1974, a large-scale complex of oriental baths was built in Tashkent.

Built in 1979-1982 under the leadership of a group of architects and designers (V. T. Khvan, M. K. Ospanov, V. Chechelev, K. R. Tulebaev, etc.) on the site of the baths in 1935 on Gogol Street. The "Arasan" complex includes oriental, Russian and Finnish baths, a hydropathic establishment, a shower pavilion, and a children's department. The complex was built in the so-called "Golden Square" of the city.

After the independence of Kazakhstan, the complex continued to be in state ownership, but was completely leased out.

The reconstruction of the entire complex was completed in 2012.

In 2016, the building of the health complex was reconstructed again. During the restoration work, a major overhaul was carried out. The oriental flavor and uniqueness of the building were not touched during the reconstruction.

== Architecture ==
According to the project, it is designed to serve 2,500 people a day. The volume of the construction is about 100,000 m^{3}. A frame building with brick walls, has 5 floors, where technical and functional premises are located. The western building dominating in the spatial composition has a semicircular outline and is crowned with a ribbed dome. Smaller domes cover the bath rooms. The health complex was built taking into account the seismicity of Almaty. It includes 12 pavilions. 6 domes are made of precast concrete. In the interior decoration, valuable species of stone, wood, ceramics, plaster were used. The facade of the building is decorated with granite and marble.

== Monument status ==
On January 26, 1984, the health-improving complex was included in the State list of historical and cultural monuments of local importance in Almaty.

On November 10, 2010, a new State List of Historical and Cultural Monuments of Local Significance of the city of Almaty was approved, simultaneously with which all previous decisions on this matter were invalidated. In this Resolution, the status of a local monument of the building of the health complex was preserved. The boundaries of the protected zones were approved in 2014.
