= Rajas con crema =

Typical Mexican dish

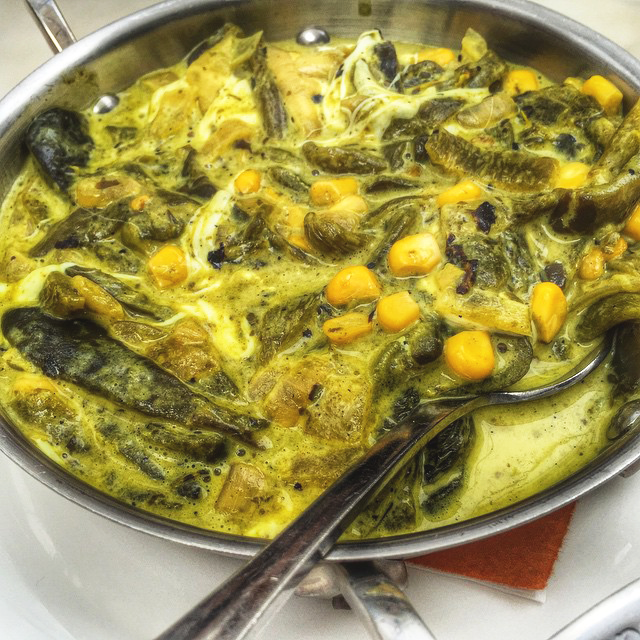
Rajas con crema

Rajas con crema is the name given to a Mexican dish consisting of sliced poblano pepper with cream (the name literally means "slices" in Spanish). It is very popular in Mexico, particularly in the central and southern parts of the country. It is one of the dishes most commonly served during taquizas (taco parties), together with tinga, mole, chicharrón, and papas con chorizo. Preparation of the dish involves roasting, peeling and slicing the peppers, sauteing them together with sliced onions, and simmering the mixture with cream. Sometimes chicken broth is added for flavor.

The original recipe uses poblano chiles, although there are also recipes that use other types of green chiles. It is recommended that the chiles are quite ripe and very dark, and should be roasted whole over direct heat or on a comal, a popular Mexican technique called "tatemado" (from the Nahuatl, tlatemati) and turned over so that all parts of the fruit are roasted and the skin is blistered. Then they are "sweated" in a bag, deveined, the seeds are removed, peeled and cut into wide strips. Together with the onion, also cut in small feathers, they are sautéed in the skillet and cooked over low heat with the heavy cream. Optionally, tender corn kernels, garlic and/or cheese are added. In some houses they also add quelites, shredded chicken meat or chicken broth.

== See also ==
- List of Mexican dishes
