= Rana language =

Rana may refer to the following varieties:

- Rana Tharu, an Indo-Aryan language of India and Nepal
- Rana, a dialect of Kutang, a Sino-Tibetan language of Nepal
- Rana, a dialect of Buru, an Austronesian language of Indonesia
