= Rahnuyeh =

Rahnuyeh راهنويه
- Village
- Location within Iran
- Coordinates: 29°54′57″N 53°01′02″E
- Country: Iran
- Province: Fars
- County: Marvdasht
- Bakhsh: Seyyedan
- Rural District: Rahmat

Population (2006)
  - Total: 689
- Time zone: UTC+3:30 (IRST)
  - Summer (DST): UTC+4:30 (IRDT)

Rahnuyeh (Persian: راهنويه, also Romanized as Rāhnūyeh; also known as Rāhnau and Rānī) is a village in Rahmat Rural District, Seyyedan District, Marvdasht County, Fars province, Iran. At the 2006 census, its population was 689, in 162 families.
