= Raña =

Raña ([ˈra.ɲa]) is a Spanish surname. Notable people with this surname include:

- Iván Raña Fuentes (born 1979), Spanish triathlete
- Mario Vázquez Raña (1932-2015), Mexican businessman
- Olegario Vázquez Raña (1935-2025), Mexican entrepreneur and principal shareholder of Grupo Empresarial Ángeles

== See also ==
- Rana (name)
