= Arsan Duolai =

Arsan Duolai is a Yakut god of the underworld. In Turkish mythology, he is known as the god of greed and evil. His servant spirits are tasked with the collection of cattle and horses for sacrifices.
