= Rani, Bachhwara =

Village in Bihar, India

Rani
- Village
- Location within Bihar Location within India
- Coordinates: 25°33′22″N 85°54′06″E
- Country: India
- State: Bihar
- District: Begusarai
- Block: Bachhwara

Government
  - Type: Sarpanch

Area
  - Total: 15.09 km^{2} (5.83 sq mi)
- Elevation: 54 m (177 ft)

Population (2011)
  - Total: 34,772
  - Density: 2,304/km^{2} (5,968/sq mi)

Languages
  - Official: Hindi
- Time zone: UTC+5:30 (IST)
- PIN: 851111
- STD code: 06278
- Vehicle registration: BR-09

Rani is a village in the state of Bihar, India. It is part of Begusarai District, situating along the National Highway 122. The population of the village was 34,772 as of the 2011 census.

== Geography ==
Rani is located to the north of the Ganges, about 3 kilometres southeast of the block seat Bachhwara. It covers a total area of 1509 hectares.

== Demographics ==
According to the 2011 Census of India, Rani had a population of 34,772 within its 7,329 households. The working population took up 34.06% of the total population. The village had an overall literacy rate of 54.79%, as 11,323 of the male inhabitants and 7,730 of the female inhabitants being literate.
