= Guru Maharaj Ji (Nigeria) =

Nigerian religious leader

Guru Maharaj Ji, born Mohammed Ajirobatan Ibrahim on December 20, 1947, is a Nigerian spiritual leader. He lives in Ibadan. He has declared himself to be a Living Perfect Master, Guru Maharaj Ji, and is also called the "Black Jesus". He says that he has power over all illnesses and all problems affecting humanity.

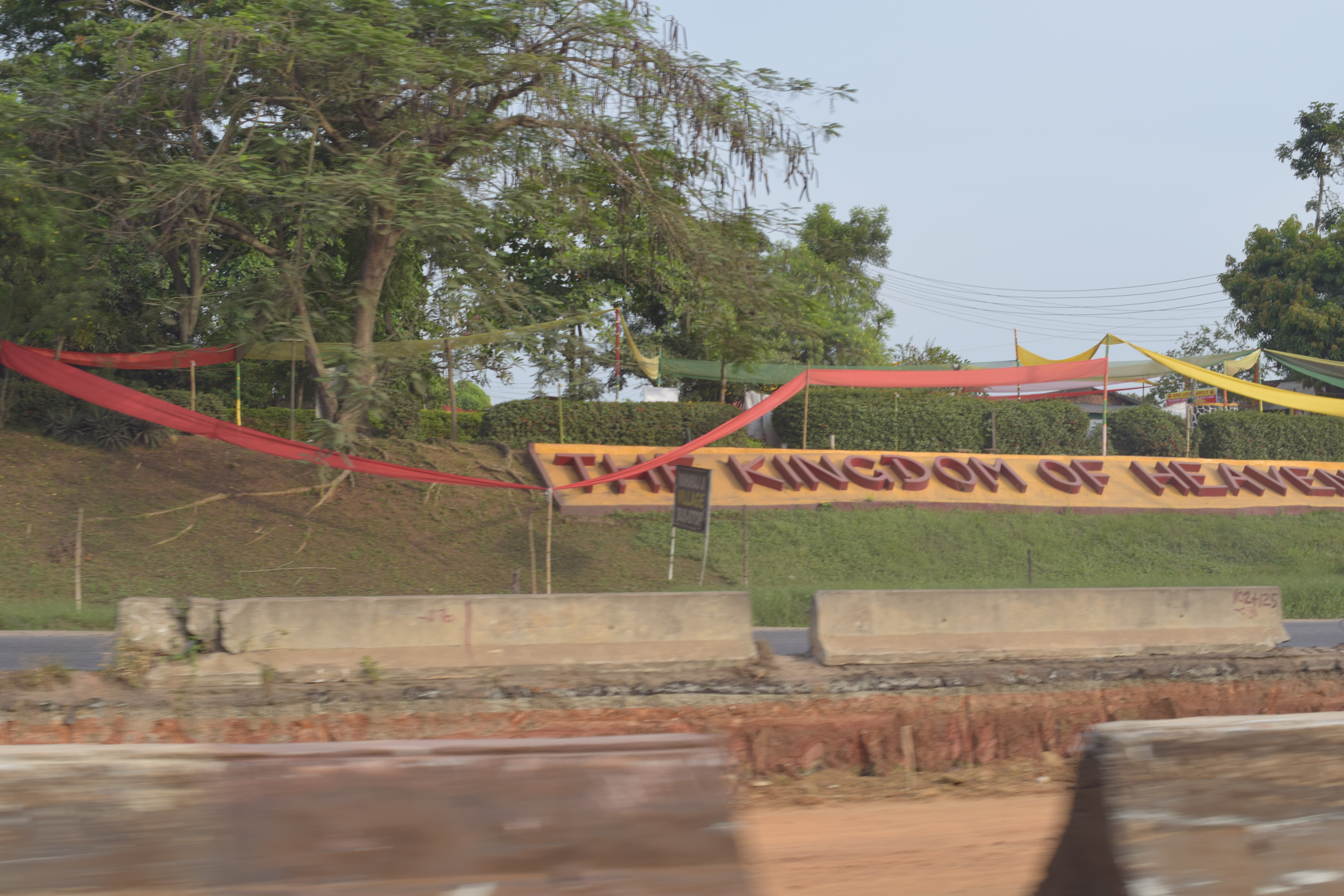
Maharaji Village Headquarters, Ibadan Express road

== Biography ==
Maharaj Ji was born in Oyo State, Nigeria. He worked for Nigeria Airways and travelled between Africa and London.

Maharaj Ji leads a communitarian group with various names, such as One Love Family; the One Love Mission; One Love, One Family; and the Divine Love Family. The group has an ashram, "Satguru Maharaj Ji Village", on a lonely stretch of the Ibadan-Lagos Expressway near Ibadan. Its members are vegetarians and wear badges as signs of their loyalty.

In 1989, former members claimed that 200 bodies were buried around the ashram. Ji was arrested, but the charges were dropped when no bodies were found. In 1999, the ashram was burned down by youths connected to the Iju Youths Progressive Union who were angered by the alleged killing of a Ghanaian man by devotees. Ji was charged with the crime along with twelve of his disciples, and was kept in jail for several months. He was again acquitted in 2000. While incarcerated he received an average of 25 visitors a day. The judge criticized the prosecution for its lack of diligence. A state governor tried to shut down the ashram and acquire the property, but Ji was able to prove ownership in court.

In 2000, he asserted that a visit by US President Bill Clinton to Nigeria was part of an American plan to open a military base in Nigeria and to take control of Africa. In 2003, he said the re-election of Olusegun Obasanjo as president of Nigeria was part of a "Golden Change", for which he was responsible. In 2004, he predicted that John Kerry would defeat George W. Bush. The same year he held a press conference warning church leaders to use contributions in accordance with biblical principles, such as feeding the poor, or else they would face the wrath of God. At a press conference in 2008, he expressed his support for Nuhu Ribadu as chairman of Nigeria's anti-corruption Economic and Financial Crimes Commission (EFCC), saying, "The fight against corruption must be seen as a genuine effort to stabilize Nigeria and give meaning to all".

During the Coronavirus pandemic in 2020, Ji at a press conference said Nigerians must move away from religion and the "Holy Ghost syndrome" and embrace divine knowledge instead in order to win the fight against the pandemic.

On December 21, 2022, he predicted that the All Progressive Congress (APC) presidential candidate will win the 2023 general election, saying, "he is from the South, and what Nigerians are clamoring for, is that the South must produce the next president.”

Those who have sought spiritual guidance from him include Mohammed Abacha and Hamza al-Mustapha.

Maharaj Ji disavows any connection to Prem Rawat, who also led a group called Divine Light Mission and was also known as the Perfect Master and Guru Maharaj Ji.
