= Barbican (drink) =

Brand of non-alcoholic malt drinks

- Type: Non-alcoholic malt drink
- Manufacturer: Aujan Industries
- Distributor: Aujan Coca-Cola Beverages Company (ACCBC)
- Origin: United Kingdom
- Introduced: 1983
- Alcohol by volume: n/a
- Website: barbicanworld.com

Barbican is a brand of non-alcoholic malt drinks distributed by the Aujan Coca-Cola Beverages Company (ACCBC). The drink is primarily sold in the Middle East and North Africa.

Due to the popularity of Barbican in the "Gulf countries" of the GCC, it has become a genericized trademark for non-alcoholic malt drinks. Due to the fruit and malt flavour of Barbican, it is sometimes used in the preparation of food, mocktails, desserts and as an accompaniment to cheese or chocolate.

== History ==
Barbican was originally manufactured by U.K.-based Bass Brewery. Aujan Industries began importing the drink for sale in the Middle East in 1983. Alongside the Swiss-made Moussy, Barbican was the first non-alcoholic malt drink to be sold in the region. Manufacturing changes at Bass disrupted supplies of Barbican to Aujan, and in 1999, Aujan purchased the Barbican brand in select markets. Aujan acquired complete control of Barbican in 2010, and began manufacturing it at the company's factory in Dubai.

Barbican accounted for 5% of Aujan's total sales in 2013.

Barbican is also sold in Malaysia. It is imported from Saudi Arabia and distributed by Coca-Cola Refreshments Malaysia. On 26 July 2011, Malaysia's National Fatwa Council declared that Barbican was "not processed to make it alcoholic, and contains low alcohol content which is not intoxicating." The ruling declared Barbican to be halaal for consumption by Muslims.

== Production ==
Barbican is manufactured at ACCBC's manufacturing plants in Dammam (Saudi Arabia) and Dubai. It is brewed using a three-stage process involving mashing, lautering and wort boiling.

During mashing, the coarsely ground barley malt is subjected to hydration with water at different temperature-time regimes, which helps in a slow break down of starch molecules into simple carbohydrates, bringing in the balanced combination of carbohydrates and proteins. In the lautering stage, all the soluble solids from the barley malt are extracted avoiding harsh and astringent components from the barley malt husk, leaving behind wort. The extracted wort is boiled along with hops which adds a hoppy aroma and bitter taste to the malt extract. The malt extract is stabilized and sterilised during boiling.

== Flavours ==
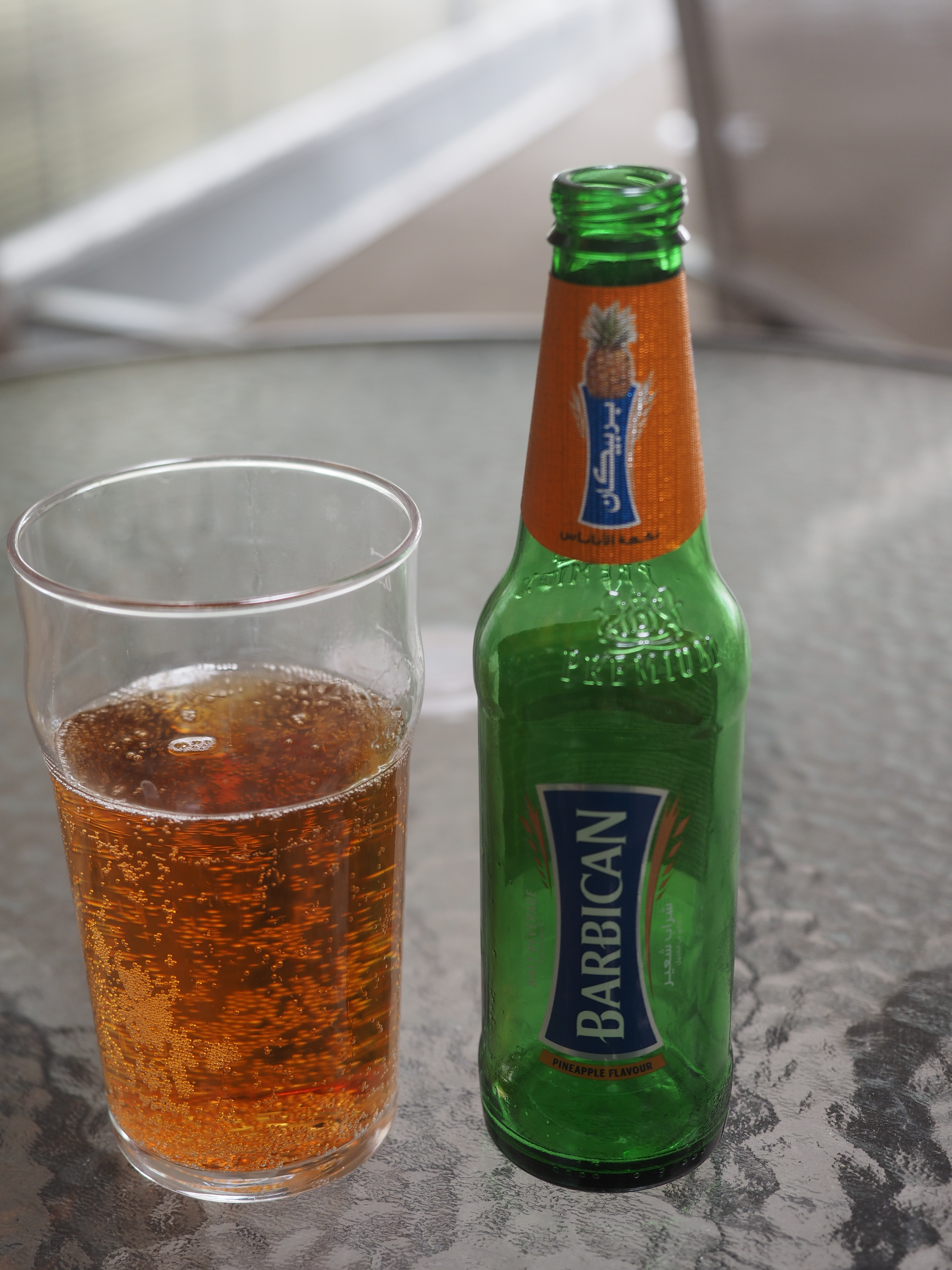
A bottle of pineapple-flavoured Barbican at a restaurant in Helsinki, Finland.

Apart from the original malt beverage, Barbican is sold in 10 fruit flavoured variants. Barbican is sold in 330 ml glass bottles and cans. The Mango & Passion Fruit, and Pomegranate are only sold in glass bottles.

- Malt
- Peach
- Raspberry
- Strawberry
- Pineapple
- Mango & Passion Fruit
- Apple
- Pomegranate
- Lemon
- Citrus
- Grape
