= Enter: The Conquering Chicken =

Studio album by the Gits
- Released: March 17, 1994
- Recorded: 1993
- Genres: Punk rock; riot grrrl
- Length: 36:51
- Labels: C/Z; Broken Rekids; Sub Pop
- Producers: Scott Benson; the Gits

The Gits chronology
| Frenching the Bully (1992) | Enter: The Conquering Chicken (1994) | Evil Stig (1995) |

Enter: The Conquering Chicken is the second and final studio album by the American punk rock band the Gits, released on March 17, 1994, through C/Z Records. It was reissued on June 17, 2003, through Broken Rekids with bonus tracks and different cover art, followed by a second reissue, remastered by Jack Endino, on January 31, 2025, through Sub Pop.

This was the final album to feature lead vocalist and lyricist Mia Zapata, who was raped and murdered on July 7, 1993, less than four weeks after the band had accepted an offer to be signed to Atlantic Records and shortly before production on the album was completed. The surviving members of the band finished the album with what they had recorded up to that point and subsequently disbanded.

== Reception ==
Professional ratings
Review scores
| Source | Rating |
|---|---|
| AllMusic | 3/5 stars |

Enter: The Conquering Chicken shows Mia Zapata pushing the blues influences that informed her vocal style to the forefront more directly than on Frenching the Bully, with songs like "A Change Is Gonna Come" (a recontextualized cover of Sam Cooke's original) and "Precious Blood." The band also arguably furthers their hardcore influences on songs like "Sign of the Crab," "Spear & Magic Helmet" and "Drunks."

== Track listing ==
1. "Bob (Cousin O.)" – 3:04
2. "Guilt Within Your Head" – 2:26
3. "Seaweed" – 2:23
4. "A Change Is Gonna Come" – 4:03
5. "Precious Blood" – 3:46
6. "Beauty of the Rose" – 2:36
7. "Drunks" – 1:37
8. "Italian Song" – 2:07
9. "Social Love I" – 2:39
10. "Social Love II" – 1:51
11. "Spear & Magic Helmet" – 2:43
12. "Drinking Song" – 2:55
13. "Sign of the Crab" – 2:33

=== Reissue track listing ===
1. "Bob (Cousin O.)" – 3:03
2. "Guilt Within Your Head" – 2:25
3. "Seaweed" – 2:25
4. "A Change Is Gonna Come" – 4:02
5. "Precious Blood" – 3:45
6. "Beauty of the Rose" – 2:36
7. "Drunks" – 1:37
8. "Italian Song" – 2:07
9. "Social Love I" – 2:39
10. "Social Love II" – 1:50
11. "Daily Bread" – 4:33
12. "Sign of the Crab" – 2:34
13. "Drinking Song" – 2:55
14. "I'm Lou" – 1:55
15. "New Fast One" – 2:00
16. "Sign of the Crab" (Live) – 2:46
17. "Seaweed" (Live) – 2:29
18. "Beauty of the Rose" (Live) – 2:44
19. "Whirlwind" (Live) – 2:59
20. "New Fast One" (Live) – 2:01
21. "Bob (Cousin O.)" (Live) – 3:07
22. "A Change Is Gonna Come" (Alternate Take) – 4:13
- Live tracks recorded at the X-Ray Cafe, Portland, Oregon, in June 1993.
