= Raná (Chrudim District) =

- Municipality
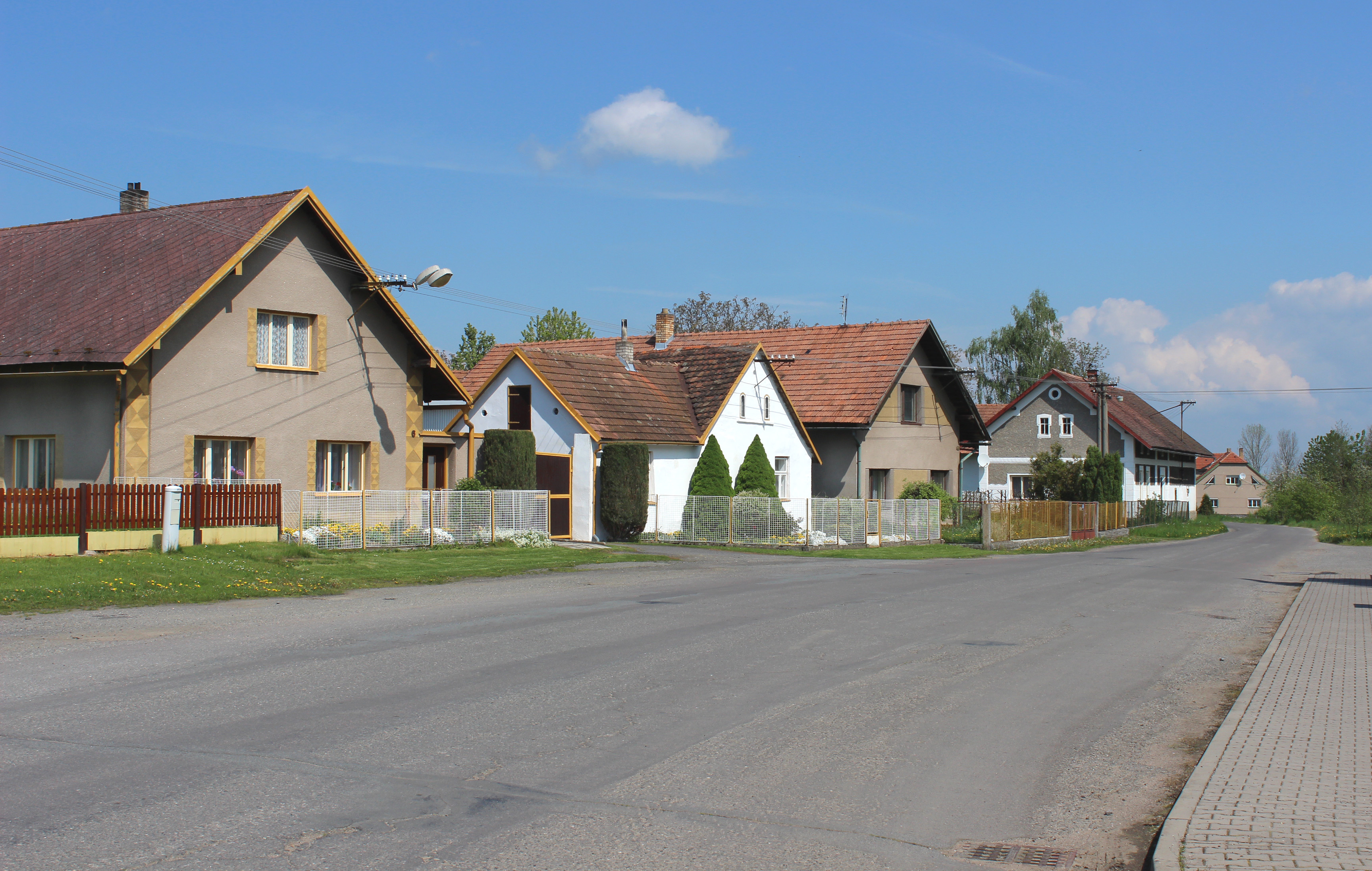
- Oldřetice, a part of Raná

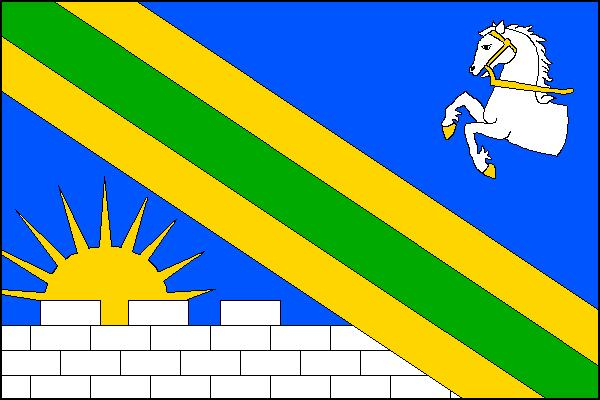
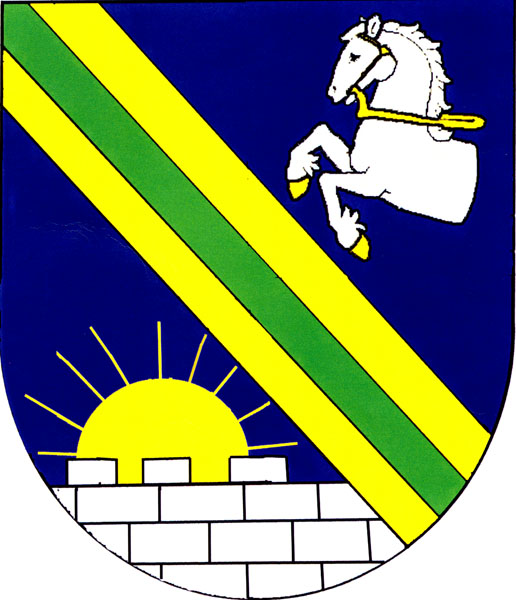
- Flag Coat of arms

- Location in the Czech Republic
- Coordinates: 49°47′47″N 15°57′51″E
- Country: Czech Republic
- Region: Pardubice
- District: Chrudim
- First mentioned: 1349

Area
  - Total: 7.04 km^{2} (2.72 sq mi)
- Elevation: 485 m (1,591 ft)

Population (2026-01-01)
  - Total: 381
  - Density: 54.1/km^{2} (140/sq mi)
- Time zone: UTC+1 (CET)
  - Summer (DST): UTC+2 (CEST)
- Postal code: 539 72
- Website: www.obecrana.cz

Raná is a municipality and village in Chrudim District in the Pardubice Region of the Czech Republic. It has about 400 inhabitants.

== Administrative division ==
Raná consists of three municipal parts (in brackets population according to the 2021 census):

- Raná (207)
- Medkovy Kopce (70)
- Oldřetice (76)

== Demographics ==
Historical population
Year	Pop.	±%
1869	614	—
1880	628	+2.3%
1890	600	−4.5%
1900	582	−3.0%
1910	632	+8.6%
1921	644	+1.9%
1930	673	+4.5%
1950	545	−19.0%
1961	521	−4.4%
1970	469	−10.0%
1980	419	−10.7%
1991	390	−6.9%
2001	366	−6.2%
2011	372	+1.6%
2021	353	−5.1%
Source: Censuses
