= Frenching the Bully =

Studio album by The Gits
- Released: November 25, 1992
- Recorded: 1991–1992
- Genres: Hardcore punk; punk rock
- Length: 30:30
- Labels: C/Z; Broken Rekids; Sub Pop
- Producers: Scott Benson; Steve Fisk

The Gits chronology
Frenching the Bully (1992)	Enter: The Conquering Chicken (1994)

Frenching the Bully is the debut studio album by the American punk rock band The Gits, released on November 25, 1992, through C/Z Records. It was reissued on June 17, 2003, through Broken Rekids with bonus tracks and different cover art, followed by a second reissue, remastered by Jack Endino, on January 31, 2025, through Sub Pop.

== Reception ==
Professional ratings
Review scores
Source	Rating
AllMusic	4.5/5 stars

The River Cities' Reader called it "A stunning document of the talent ... [of] singer Mia Zapata ... She sings with such conviction, ferocity, and expressiveness that the lyrics become irrelevant. The band becomes irrelevant." William Athey of The Forum was positive, writing that the band "demonstrate too much dexterity with their instruments to fall into a stereotypical thrash classification," and of Zapata's vocals notes, "when things slow down she gets an engaging quaver in her voice." It was selected by Russ Rankin as a top 10 favorite album.

== Track listing ==
1. "Absynthe" – 3:13
2. "Another Shot of Whiskey" – 2:43
3. "Insecurities" – 1:46
4. "Slaughter of Bruce" – 3:18
5. "Kings and Queens" – 2:00
6. "It All Dies Anyway" – 4:10
7. "While You're Twisting, I'm Still Breathing" – 2:38
8. "A" – 1:26
9. "Wingo Lamo" – 2:13
10. "Cut My Skin, It Makes Me Human" – 2:19
11. "Here's to Your Fuck" (F. Booth) – 1:53
12. "Second Skin" – 2:51

=== Reissue track listing ===
1. "Absynthe" – 3:13
2. "Another Shot of Whiskey" – 2:41
3. "Insecurities" – 1:45
4. "Slaughter of Bruce" – 3:16
5. "Kings and Queens" – 1:59
6. "It All Dies Anyway" – 4:07
7. "While You're Twisting, I'm Still Breathing" – 2:37
8. "A" – 1:24
9. "Wingo Lamo" – 2:11
10. "Spear and Magic Helmet" – 2:37
11. "Cut My Skin, It Makes Me Human" – 2:16
12. "Here's to Your Fuck" (F. Booth) – 1:52
13. "Second Skin" – 2:51
14. "While You're Twisting, I'm Still Breathing" (Live) – 2:38
15. "Insecurities" (Live) – 1:48
16. "Slaughter of Bruce" (Live) – 3:14
17. "Absynthe" (Live) – 3:04
18. "Another Shot of Whiskey" (Live) – 2:40
19. "Wingo Lamo" (Live) – 2:19
20. "Here's to Your Fuck" (Live) – 1:50
21. "Second Skin" (Live) – 3:13
22. "While You're Twisting, I'm Still Breathing" (Single Version) – 2:43
- Live tracks recorded at the X-Ray Cafe, Portland, Oregon, in June 1993.
