= Comet Tavern =

Restaurant in Seattle, Washington, U.S.

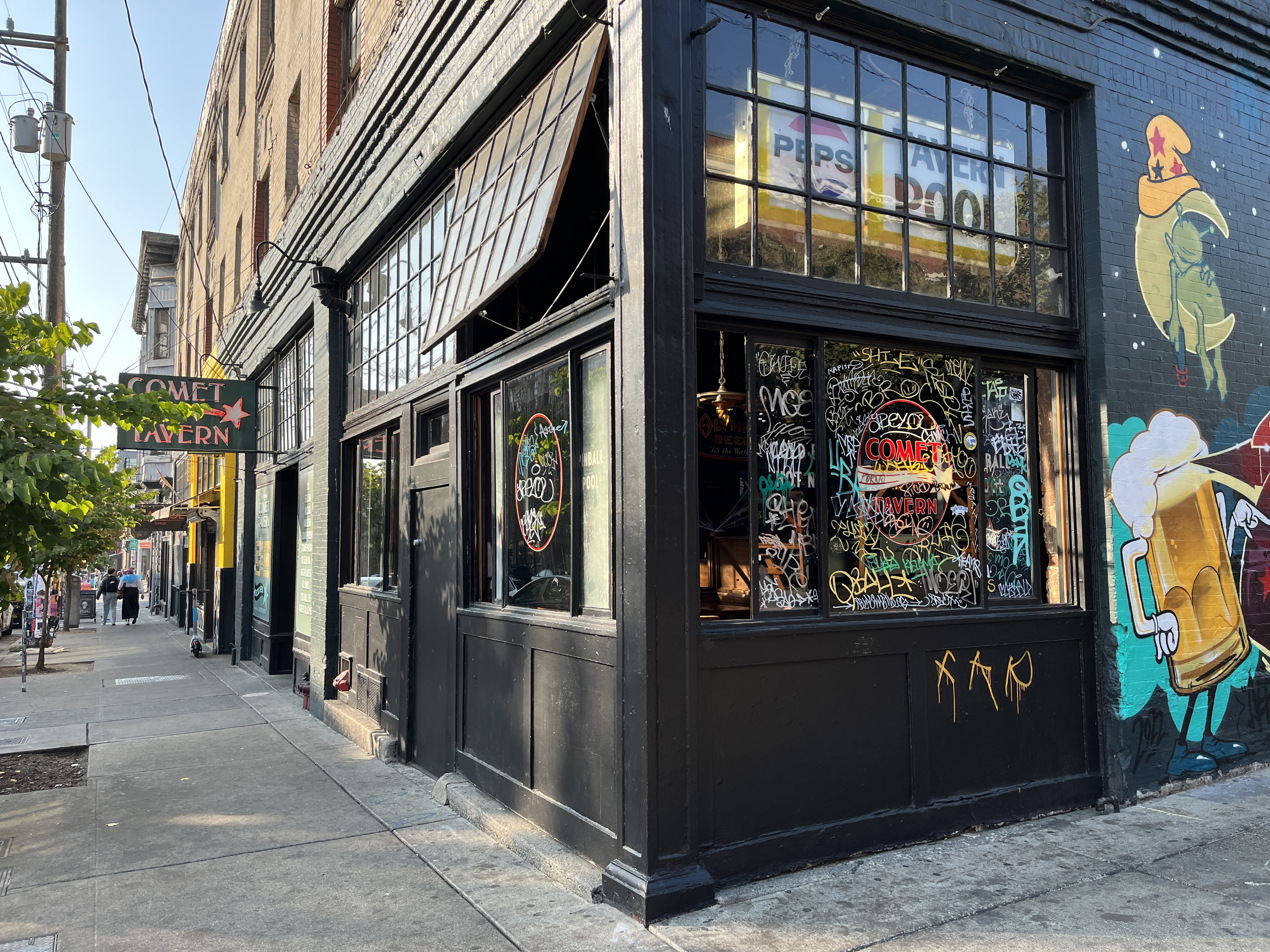
- Exterior in 2022
- Interactive map of Comet Tavern

Restaurant information
- Location: 922 E Pike St, Seattle, King, Washington, 98122, United States
- Coordinates: 47°36′51.3″N 122°19′11.1″W

Comet Tavern is a restaurant on Seattle's Capitol Hill, in the U.S. state of Washington.

== Description ==
The bar has been described as a "grunge institution", a "smoky" dive, and a "rocker's hangout".

== History ==
David Meinert has been a co-owner.

== Reception ==
Alexa Peters included the bar in Thrillist's 2019 list of "The Best Bars for Single Mingling in Seattle".

== See also ==
- List of dive bars
