= Selene Vigil =

American singer (born 1965)

- Born: Selene Here Vigil; July 16, 1965 (age 61)
- Spouse: Brad Wilk (m. 2005; div. 2013)
- Children: 2
- Musical career
- Genres: Grunge, punk rock
- Occupation: Singer
- Years active: 1990–present
- Labels: C/Z, Atlantic, Tuck & Roll Music
- Formerly of: 7 Year Bitch

Selene Here Vigil (born July 16, 1965) is an American musician best known as the lead vocalist for the punk rock band 7 Year Bitch.

== Career ==
In 1990, Vigil co-founded the punk rock band 7 Year Bitch alongside Elizabeth Davis, Valerie Agnew, and Stefanie Sargent. The band released three studio albums before disbanding in 1997. In 2009, she was working as a Pilates instructor.

In 2010, Vigil released her debut solo album, That Was Then. In 2017, she released her second solo album, Tough Dance. Vigil has not recorded or released any new material as of 2026.

== Personal life ==
In the early 1990s, Vigil briefly dated Screaming Trees lead vocalist Mark Lanegan, but the couple broke up due to Lanegan's substance abuse problems. On December 10, 2005, Vigil married Rage Against the Machine drummer Brad Wilk after ten years of dating, with whom she has two sons, Luka and Alexander.

In June 2013, Vigil filed for divorce after eight years of marriage allegedly due to Wilk having an affair with a Las Vegas strip club employee, but the couple reconciled upon learning that the woman in question lied about being pregnant with Wilk's child. In November 2017, Vigil restarted divorce proceedings after Wilk left her for actress and musician Juliette Lewis, having gone on tour with Lewis and her band, Juliette and the Licks, earlier that year.

Wilk disputed Vigil's claims, stating that the marriage ended due to physical intimacy issues following the birth of their second son. He allegedly pleaded with Vigil to attend marriage counseling, but she refused. Wilk also claimed that he and Vigil never reconciled and by the time he began dating Lewis, the couple had been separated for six years.

== Discography ==
7 Year Bitch

=== Albums ===
- Sick 'Em (C/Z Records, 1992).
- ¡Viva Zapata! (C/Z Records, 1994).
- Gato Negro (Atlantic Records, 1996).

=== Singles/EPs ===
- "Lorna" b/w "No Fucking War," "You Smell Lonely" (Rathouse/Face The Music Records), (1991; reissued by C/Z Records in 1992).
- "Antidisestablishmentarianism EP" (Rugger Bugger Records, 1992)
- "7 Year Bitch" / "Thatcher on Acid" "Can We Laugh Now?" / "No Fucking War" (Clawfist Records, 1992)
- "7 Year Bitch EP" (C/Z Records, 1992)
- "Rock-A-Bye Baby" b/w "Wide Open Trap" (C/Z Records, 1994)
- "The History of My Future" b/w "24,900 Miles Per Hour" (promo only) (Atlantic Records, 1996)
- "24,900 Miles Per Hour" (promo only) (Atlantic Records, 1996)
- "Miss Understood" b/w "Go!" (Man's Ruin, 1996)

=== Other contributions ===
- "8-Ball Deluxe" on Kill Rock Stars (Kill Rock Stars, Nov '12).
- "Dead Men Don't Rape" on There's A Dyke in the Pit (Outpunk/Harp Records, 1992).
- "The Scratch" on Power Flush: San Francisco, Seattle & You (Rathouse/Broken Rekids, 1993).
- "In Lust You Trust" on Rawk Atlas (promo only) (C/Z Records, 1993).
- "Dead Men Don't Rape" on Progression (Progression, 1994).
- "The Scratch," "Icy Blue" on the Mad Love Motion Picture Soundtrack (Zoo Records, 1995).
- "Kiss My Ass Goodbye" on Seattle Women in Rock: A Diverse Collection (Insight Records, 1995).
- "Damn Good And Well" on Space Mountain (Rough Trade Publishing, 1995).
- "The Scratch" on Take A Lick (promo only) (BMG, 1995).
- "M.I.A." on Notes From The Underground, Vol. 2 (Priority Records, 1995).
- "Mad Dash" on Home Alive: The Art Of Self-Defense (Epic Records, 1996).
- "24,900 Miles Per Hour" on huH Music Sampler No. 23 (promo only, RayGun Press, 1996).
- "Knot (Live)" on Hype! The Motion Picture Soundtrack (Sub Pop Records, 1996).
- "Damn Good And Well" on Rough Cuts: The Best Of Rough Trade Publishing, 1991–1995 (Rough Trade Publishing, 1997).
- "Rock-A-Bye Baby" on She's A Rebel (Beloved/Shanachie Records, 1997).
- "Shake Appeal" on We Will Fall: The Iggy Pop Tribute (Royalty Records, 1997).
- "M.I.A." on Whatever: The 90's Pop & Culture Box (Flying Rhino Records/WEA, 2005).
- "The Scratch" on Sleepless in Seattle: The Birth of Grunge (LiveWire Recordings, 2006).

=== Music videos ===
- "In Lust You Trust" (1992)
- "Hip Like Junk" (1994)
- "24,900 Miles Per Hour" (1996)

Solo

=== Albums ===
- That Was Then (Tuck & Roll Music, 2010)
- Tough Dance (2017)

== Filmography ==
=== Film ===
- The Gits Movie (2005)
- Hype! (1996)
- Mad Love (1995)
