= Sleepless in Seattle: The Birth of Grunge =

Compilation album by Various artists
- Released: February 7, 2006
- Recorded: February 1982 – November 1993
- Genre: Grunge
- Length: 64:52
- Label: Livewire
- Producers: Clark Humphrey; Ted Myers

Sleepless in Seattle: The Birth of Grunge is a various artists compilation album released on February 7, 2006, by Livewire Recordings. The album features a sixteen-page booklet of liner notes written by Clark Humphrey that details the history of the Seattle music scene from the mid 80s to early 90s.

== Reception ==
Professional ratings
Review scores
Source	Rating
AllMusic	3.5/5 stars

Steve Leggett of AllMusic calls Sleepless in Seattle: The Birth of Grunge "a nice set from a fascinating era." David Browne of Entertainment Weekly praised the remastered music and called the album a "compilation of unruly Northwestern hard rock of the '80s and '90s is a valuable reminder that Seattle gave us more than Nirvana." The Louisville Eccentric Observer claimed "what's here is empirical, historical documentation that a movement had been afoot long before Kurt Cobain's sad, snarling blue eyes looked through you."

Tim Perlich NOW was critical of Sleepless in Seattle's the track selection and said "a Seattle grunge comp without Mudhoney's Touch Me I'm Sick is one you don't need." Seattle Weekly criticized the aesthetics of the liner notes but warmly received the music, saying "the whole thing flows like a prized mixtape."

== Track listing ==
No.	Title	Writer(s)	Artist	Length
1.	"Happy Hunting Ground"	Werner, Rieflin, Barker, Barker	The Blackouts	4:52
2.	"Mohawk Man"	Arm, D. Morey, T. Morey, Smitty	Mr. Epp & The Calculations	2:54
3.	"Solid Action"	Bigley, Price, Ryan	U-Men	2:10
4.	"Come on Down"	Ament, Arm, Gossard	Green River	3:21
5.	"Grinding Process"	Crover, Lukin, Osborne	Melvins	2:07
6.	"With Yo' Heart (Not Yo' Hands)"	Hagar, A. Wood, K. Wood	Malfunkshun	3:52
7.	"Orange Airplane"	G. Conner, V. Conner, Lanegan, Pickerel	Screaming Trees	3:01
8.	"In 'n' Out of Grace"	Arm, Lukin, Peters, Turner	Mudhoney	5:29
9.	"He's My Thing"	Barbero, Bjelland, Leon	Babes in Toyland	2:57
10.	"Giant Killer"	Danielson, Doyle, Wied, Thorstensen	TAD	3:04
11.	"Crawl"	Brooks, Skinner, Litwin	Coffin Break	4:31
12.	"Guilt Regret Embarrassment"	Brown, Flower, Martsch, Schmaljohn	Treepeople	2:29
13.	"Hallowed Ground"	Endino, House, McMillan	Skin Yard	3:08
14.	"Tribe"	McMillan	Gruntruck	4:18
15.	"Second Skin"	Dresdner, Moriarty, Spleen, Zapata	The Gits	2:53
16.	"Half Past You"	Fairweather, Finn, Nine, Whitworth	Love Battery	3:07
17.	"Trip"	Akre, Atkins, Bosch, Thurmond	Hammerbox	3:31
18.	"Losing Skin"	Atkins, Neal, Stauffer, Werner	Seaweed	2:45
19.	"The Scratch"	Agnew, Davis, Dunne, Vigil	7 Year Bitch	1:59
20.	"Creepy Jackalope Eye"	Bolton, Heathman, Matzohballs, Spaghetti	The Supersuckers	2:24

== Personnel ==
Adapted from the Sleepless in Seattle: The Birth of Grunge liner notes.

- Colin Cobb – executive-producer
- Clark Humphrey – production, compiling
- Emily Lazar – remastering
- Steve Moriarty – photography
- Ted Myers – production
- Charles Peterson – photography
- Mark Pollock – art director, design

== Release history ==
Region	Date	Label	Format	Catalog
United States	2006	Livewire	CD	LWR-1012
