= Stefanie Sargent =

American punk rock musician (1968–1992)

- Sargent c. 1990-1992

Background information
- Born: Stefanie Ann Sargent; June 1, 1968; Seattle, Washington, U.S.
- Died: June 27, 1992 (aged 24) Seattle, Washington, U.S.
- Genres: Punk rock
- Occupation: Musician
- Instrument: Guitar
- Years active: 1990–1992
- Label: C/Z Records
- Formerly of: 7 Year Bitch

Stefanie Ann Sargent (June 1, 1968 – June 27, 1992) was an American musician who was the original guitarist and co-founder of the punk rock band 7 Year Bitch. She was also referred to by her nickname "Friday".

Sargent died of asphyxiation from vomiting due to a heroin overdose in June 1992 at the age of 24, having been sober for eight months before relapsing. The band's debut studio album, Sick 'Em (1992), which was the only one to feature Sargent, was scheduled to be released in July 1992, but was postponed to October 1992 to allow time for friends and family to mourn. Following careful consideration and a period of uncertainty, the surviving members of 7 Year Bitch made the decision to continue and recruited Roisin Dunne as their new guitarist.

== Early life ==
Sargent was born to Paula and Kenneth Sargent on June 1, 1968, in Seattle, Washington, where she was raised. She attended Roosevelt High School, then transferred to the Summit K-12 Alternative School, and graduated at age 16.

== Career ==
After leaving high school, Sargent worked various jobs and traveled across the West Coast. She was a member of several bands, including Barbie's Dream Car.

In 1990, she co-founded 7 Year Bitch alongside Selene Vigil, Valerie Agnew and Elizabeth Davis. The band made their debut opening for The Gits, then played at a Books for Prisoners Benefit concert. Sargent played guitar on the band's debut record, Sick 'Em (1992).

== Death ==
Sargent was found dead in her Capitol Hill apartment on June 28, 1992. After consuming alcohol and using heroin at a party after having been sober for eight months, she returned home and passed out on her back. She died of asphyxiation after vomiting, having failed to wake up. A syringe was found near her body.

Sargent died while 7 Year Bitch was recording their first full album, Sick 'Em, which was originally scheduled to be released in July 1992, but was postponed to October 1992 and was dedicated to her. 7 Year Bitch's second album, ¡Viva Zapata! (1994), is a tribute to both Sargent and The Gits' lead singer Mia Zapata.

== Discography ==
=== Albums ===
- Sick 'Em (C/Z Records, 1992).

=== Other contributions ===
- "8-Ball Deluxe" on Kill Rock Stars (Kill Rock Stars, Nov '12).
- "Dead Men Don't Rape" on There's A Dyke in the Pit (Outpunk/Harp Records, 1992).
