= Elizabeth Davis (bassist) =

American songwriter

Elizabeth Davis-Simpson
- Genres: grunge, punk rock
- Occupation: Musician
- Instrument: Bass
- Years active: 1988–present
- Labels: C/Z, Atlantic

Elizabeth Davis-Simpson is an American musician and songwriter best known as the bassist of the punk rock band 7 Year Bitch. She later worked on projects such as These Streets with Valerie Agnew, and has participated in a band named Clone.

== Discography ==
=== Albums ===
- Sick 'Em (C/Z Records, 1992).
- ¡Viva Zapata! (C/Z Records, 1994).
- Gato Negro (Atlantic Records, 1996).

=== Singles/EPs ===
- "Lorna" b/w "No Fucking War," "You Smell Lonely" (Rathouse/Face The Music Records), (1991; reissued by C/Z Records in 1992).
- "Antidisestablishmentarianism EP" (Rugger Bugger Records, 1992)
- "7 Year Bitch" / "Thatcher on Acid" "Can We Laugh Now?" / "No Fucking War" (Clawfist Records, 1992)
- "7 Year Bitch EP" (C/Z Records, 1992)
- "Rock-A-Bye Baby" b/w "Wide Open Trap" (C/Z Records, 1994)
- "The History of My Future" b/w "24,900 Miles Per Hour" (promo only) (Atlantic Records, 1996)
- "24,900 Miles Per Hour" (promo only) (Atlantic Records, 1996)
- "Miss Understood" b/w "Go!" (Man's Ruin, 1996)

=== Other contributions ===
- "8-Ball Deluxe" on Kill Rock Stars (Kill Rock Stars, Nov '12).
- "Dead Men Don't Rape" on There's A Dyke in the Pit (Outpunk/Harp Records, 1992).
- "The Scratch" on Power Flush: San Francisco, Seattle & You (Rathouse/Broken Rekids, 1993).
- "In Lust You Trust" on Rawk Atlas (promo only) (C/Z Records, 1993).
- "Dead Men Don't Rape" on Progression (Progression, 1994).
- "The Scratch," "Icy Blue" on the Mad Love Motion Picture Soundtrack (Zoo Records, 1995).
- "Kiss My Ass Goodbye" on Seattle Women in Rock: A Diverse Collection (Insight Records, 1995).
- "Damn Good And Well" on Space Mountain (Rough Trade Publishing, 1995).
- "The Scratch" on Take A Lick (promo only) (BMG, 1995).
- "M.I.A." on Notes From The Underground, Vol. 2 (Priority Records, 1995).
- "Mad Dash" on Home Alive: The Art Of Self-Defense (Epic Records, 1996).
- "24,900 Miles Per Hour" on huH Music Sampler No. 23 (promo only, RayGun Press, 1996).
- "Knot (Live)" on Hype! The Motion Picture Soundtrack (Sub Pop Records, 1996).
- "Damn Good And Well" on Rough Cuts: The Best Of Rough Trade Publishing, 1991–1995 (Rough Trade Publishing, 1997).
- "Rock-A-Bye Baby" on She's A Rebel (Beloved/Shanachie Records, 1997).
- "Shake Appeal" on We Will Fall: The Iggy Pop Tribute (Royalty Records, 1997).
- "M.I.A." on Whatever: The 90's Pop & Culture Box (Flying Rhino Records/WEA, 2005).
- "The Scratch" on Sleepless in Seattle: The Birth of Grunge (LiveWire Recordings, 2006).

=== Music videos ===
- "In Lust You Trust" (1992)
- "Hip Like Junk" (1994)
- "24,900 Miles Per Hour" (1996)

=== Film ===
- The Gits Movie (2005)
- Mad Love (1995)
