= Gato Negro =

1996 studio album by 7 Year Bitch

Studio album by 7 Year Bitch
- Released: March 12, 1996
- Recorded: October 1995
- Studio: Brilliant (San Francisco)
- Genre: Punk rock; hard rock; noise rock
- Length: 35:00
- Label: Atlantic
- Producer: Billy Anderson; 7 Year Bitch

7 Year Bitch chronology
¡Viva Zapata! (1994)	Gato Negro (1996)	Live at Moe (2016)

Singles from Gato Negro
- 1. "Miss Understood" Released: January 1996; 2. "The History of My Future" Released: March 1996; 3. "24,900 Miles Per Hour" Released: June 18, 1996

Gato Negro (Spanish: "Black Cat") is the third and final studio album by American rock band 7 Year Bitch, released on March 12, 1996, through Atlantic Records. The band recorded the album with producer Billy Anderson at Brilliant Studios in San Francisco in October 1995. Gato Negro is a punk rock, hard rock and noise rock album featuring a heavier, slower sound, and displays greater musical variation and dynamics compared to 7 Year Bitch's previous albums. The album spawned three singles, "Miss Understood", "The History of My Future", and "24,900 Miles Per Hour", with a music video being filmed for the latter.

Gato Negro received mixed reviews from music critics; whilst some considered its songwriting to be an improvement from 7 Year Bitch's previous albums, others found it average or generic-sounding. To promote the album, 7 Year Bitch toured North America as a headlining act and on the Summerland Tour with Everclear, Spacehog and Tracy Bonham. Guitarist Roisin Dunne left the band thereafter, leading to the cancellation of a planned tour of Europe. Following a hiatus, 7 Year Bitch toured with Lisa Fay Beatty as their new guitarist before disbanding in late 1997.

== Background and recording ==
In 1994, 7 Year Bitch released their second album ¡Viva Zapata! through C/Z Records. Shortly before the album's release, the band signed to Atlantic Records, who offered them tour support and better distribution of their albums. Their contract guaranteed them complete creative control, ranging from the production to the artwork of their releases. After touring in support of ¡Viva Zapata! and working on other projects including Home Alive, 7 Year Bitch began writing new songs in the summer of 1995. Bassist Elizabeth Davis wrote the music on Gato Negro, whilst vocalist Selene Vigil wrote the lyrics and her own vocal lines. Davis had begun playing other instruments prior to working on the album and subsequently began "think[ing] of songs as a whole" than focussing solely on basslines, though she felt the other members of 7 Year Bitch brought in their own "garnishing" to the songs. "24,900 Miles Per Hour" was originally written for the 1995 film Mad Love, which the band performed in.

7 Year Bitch recorded Gato Negro with producer Billy Anderson at Brilliant Studios in San Francisco across three weeks in October 1995. The band were introduced to Anderson by the post-metal band Neurosis, and guitarist Roisin Dunne credited him with making the album's recording a relaxed experience for them. The band's members lived in the studio whilst recording the album, and finished writing some of its songs there; they also held jams and parties in the large recording space they used. They were involved extensively in the album's production, and sought to make each song stand out individually. Drummer Valerie Agnew said 7 Year Bitch aimed to capture a live sound and were hesitant to use studio technology as they were afraid of sounding "really slick or pumped up". Vigil sung through old microphones or a microphone passing through a snare drum to add more texture to her vocals on some songs. The band spent two weeks mixing the album at Different Fur Recording in San Francisco, and finished mastering for it in December 1995.

== Composition ==
Gato Negro has been described as punk rock, hard rock, and noise rock. Vincent Jeffries of AllMusic described it as "post-grunge garage rock". The album features a heavier and slower sound compared to 7 Year Bitch's previous albums, and displays greater musical variation and dynamics. Mark Jenkins of The Washington Post said the album retained a "frequently ferocious" attack and attitude despite being less dark than the band's prior output. Driven primarily by bass and backed by occasionally lo-fi production, the album's songs feature elements from punk rock, heavy metal, pop, funk and blues and incorporate noise and feedback effects. Davis said that 7 Year Bitch wanted to experiment more with rhythm on Gato Negro and felt it emphasized aggression over melody. In an interview with Ox-Fanzine, she cited the Jesus Lizard, Girls Against Boys, and Fugazi as influences on the album, whilst also highlighting "personal influences" such as Patti Smith and Henry Rollins for Vigil and AC/DC and Motörhead for Agnew. Vigil moves between snarling, yelping, and spoken word, and applies distortion effects her vocals on several tracks. Her lyrics drew from her personal experiences, friendships or relationships; Agnew said they were ultimately left up to interpretation.

Gato Negro opens with "The History of My Future", an energetic track driven by a "slinky, drag-race guitar riff". Martin Renzhofer of The Salt Lake Tribune described it as having a "single minded intensity". Centered around sparse bass and drum arrangements, "Crying Shame" is a "languid broken-heart lament" that breaks out a "mean hook", according to David Holthouse of the Phoenix New Times. Estelle Tang of Pitchfork highlighted the song's chorus for its "nursery rhyme rhythm". "Deep in the Heart" and "The Midst" are driven by blues, with the former emphasizing dynamics and the latter featuring diverging vocal and guitars. "24,900 Miles Per Hour" sees Vigil "[detail] the demise of a 'poor white trash' girl" whilst alternating between "melodic narration" and more aggressive cadences, per Tang. "Whoopie Cat" is driven by riffs and "intense" vocals. "Miss Understood" features a "loping" groove and distorted vocals, whilst "Sore Subject" is a moody track marked by confessional and humorous lyrics. "Rest My Head" and "2nd Hand" are both fast, aggressive songs; the latter was highlighted for its hardcore and metal influences.

Gato Negro, which means "Black Cat" in Spanish, was titled after a low-cost wine brand Davis liked. Although black cats are seen in superstition as a symbol of bad luck, Davis said the title referred to "back luck of the past than bad luck of the future"; she also said it held different meanings for 7 Year Bitch's members, such as relating to Vigil's Mexican American heritage and their belief that "bad luck means turning it around and taking things higher." The album's cover artwork is a drawing of 7 Year Bitch by comic book artist Jaime Hernandez, and its liner notes feature photos of the band smoking and drinking. The lyrics were not printed in the liner notes due to how personal they were for Vigil, according to Davis.

== Release and promotion ==
Gato Negro was released through Atlantic Records on March 12, 1996. "Miss Understood" was released as a 7" single through Man's Ruin Records in January 1996, whilst "The History of My Future" and "24,900 Miles Per Hour" were released as radio singles in March and June that year, respectively. The band filmed a music video "24,900 Miles Per Hour" in Chicago on March 20, 1996. Davis said that Atlantic found Gato Negro difficult to market and felt the label was frustrated by 7 Year Bitch's lack of a long-term plan outside of touring. She was also unhappy with the video "24,900 Miles Per Hour" being censored for MTV airplay, feeling the edits—which omitted seven words including "fuck" and "gun"—made the song "[sound] like there's a crack in the record". Atlantic did not promote Gato Negro in Europe, though Davis embarked on a self-financed press tour of the region. She believed that 7 Year Bitch should have signed to another label to release the album there.

7 Year Bitch debuted several songs from Gato Negro during a New Years' Eve performance at Club Moe's in Seattle in 1995. From March to May 1996, the band embarked on a headlining tour of North America; they were supported by Sixteen Deluxe until April 2. The band then joined the Summerland Tour, headlined by Everclear and featuring Spacehog and Tracy Bonham, between June 26 and August 2, 1996. 7 Year Bitch planned to tour Europe in August and September 1996, which Davis described as an "act of rebellion" against Atlantic, but cancelled it after Dunne left the band that month for personal reasons. The band's final show with Dunne was streamed online, and later released as the live album Live at Moe in 2016. After a hiatus, 7 Year Bitch's live sound engineer Lisa Fay Beatty joined as their new guitarist. The band attempted to work on new material and toured the West Coast in 1997, but issues stemming from its members relocating to different places led to their disbandment later that year. Agnew said 7 Year Bitch were still signed to Atlantic at the time of their disbandment, though believed they "might have been dropped after another year or so".

== Critical reception ==
Professional ratings
Review scores
Source	Rating
AllMusic	2.5/5 stars
Alternative Press	3/5 stars
Christgau's Consumer Guide	(1-star Honorable Mention)
The Encyclopedia of Popular Music	3/5 stars
Entertainment Weekly	C
Fort Worth Star-Telegram	3.5/5 stars
The Tampa Tribune	2/4 stars

Gato Negro received mixed reviews from critics. Nick Johnstone of Melody Maker viewed the album as representing "rock as it should be: confrontational, lowdown dirty, personal, basic, defiant." Ron Tolleson of Hit Parader praised 7 Year Bitch's musical and lyrical growth; Jenkins of The Washington Post felt it improved on structures and dynamics without losing the aggression of the band's previous releases. Cashbox reviewer Steve Baltin opined that the album showed 7 Year Bitch had established their own sound outside the confines of punk and hard rock and "figures to be the record where people finally realize [they are] no novelty". Matt Pensinger of The Gazette said that although its arrangements were "somewhat unsettling and alarming, [they] quickly [became] purely invigorating". Robert Christgau gave the album a "one-star honorable mention", indicating "a worthy effort consumers attuned to its overriding aesthetic or individual vision may well like": he selected "The History of My Future" and "Miss Understood" as highlights.

Holthouse of the Phoenix News Times found most of Gato Negro to be "merely serviceable". Eric Bensel of Alternative Press said the album was "at times a generic grunge [sic] fronted by the predictable riot grrrl snarl" but also had occasional curveballs for listeners, such as the "bitter" lyrics in "2nd Hand". Jeff Vorva of the Northwest Herald and John Terlesky of The Morning Call both believed 7 Year Bitch were most effective on songs that embraced loudness and intensity but also that the band did not go far enough; the former felt those types of songs were "exceptions rather [than] the rule", whilst the latter felt 7 Year Bitch lacked versatility beyond aggression compared to Hole. Entertainment Weekly's Mike Flatherty dismissed the album as "a humorless clutch of tough-grrrl conventions" and deemed it indicative of "a band—possibly a genre—running out of ideas."

Gato Negro was ranked at number 34 on The Rocket's list of "The 40 Best Northwest Releases" of 1996. In The Trouser Press Guide to '90s Rock (1997), Grant Alden called the album 7 Year Bitch's "most varied, accomplished and coherent outing", highlighting its instrumentation. Jeffries of AllMusic deemed it only "above average" and felt it was structurally disjointed. In her review of Live at Moe (2016) for Pitchfork, Tang called Gato Negro "simultaneously less scrappy and less compelling" than 7 Year Bitch's previous albums and felt its lyrics were more clichéd.

== Track listing ==
All lyrics are written by Selene Vigil; all music is composed by Elizabeth Davis.

No.	Title	Length
1.	"The History of My Future"	2:14
2.	"Crying Shame"	4:09
3.	"Disillusion"	3:05
4.	"Deep in the Heart"	3:02
5.	"The Midst"	3:29
6.	"24,900 Miles Per Hour"	3:27
7.	"Whoopie Cat"	3:02
8.	"Miss Understood"	3:07
9.	"Sore Subject"	2:06
10.	"Rest My Head"	2:57
11.	"2nd Hand"	1:44
12.	"Jack"	2:36
Total length:		35:00

== Personnel ==
Adapted from liner notes.

7 Year Bitch
- Selene Vigil – vocals
- Roisin Dunne – guitar
- Elizabeth Davis – bass
- Valerie Agnew – drums

Artwork

- Jaime Hernandez – illustration
- Marcelo Krasilic – photography
- Sung Lee-Crawforth – art direction, design
- 7 Year Bitch – art direction, design
Production
- 7 Year Bitch – production
- Billy Anderson – production, mixing, engineering
- Mike Bogus – assistant engineer
- Adam Munaz – mixing assistant, pre-mastering
- Stephen Marcussen – mastering
- Don C. Tyler – digital editing
