= Steve Wied =

American drummer

- Born: Stephen Frederick Wiederhold; May 18, 1964 (age 61); Houston, Texas, United States
- Genres: Alternative metal, grunge, alternative rock, heavy metal, hard rock
- Instrument: Drums
- Labels: Roadrunner, Cruz, Sub Pop, C/Z
- Formerly of: Skin Yard, Tad, Willard, Daddy Hate Box, Foil

Stephen Frederick Wiederhold (born May 18, 1964), known as Steve Wied, is an American musician who was the original drummer for Seattle, Washington-based grunge bands Tad and Willard. Wied had played in bands Skin Yard and Death and Taxes, before being recruited by Tad Doyle in 1988 to form the band Tad. With Wied, Tad released God's Balls, Salt Lick, and 8-Way Santa, as well as touring Europe with fellow Seattle band Nirvana on the "Heavier Than Heaven" tour.

While in Tad, Wied and Pete Litwin of Coffin Break started an "anti-Mother Love Bone" band called Daddy Hate Box, in response to Mother Love Bone getting a good record deal. They released an EP called "Sugar Plow", produced by Wied's Skin Yard bandmate and Tad producer Jack Endino, and they broke up shortly after its release.

In 1991, Wied left Tad for a new band, Willard. They released one album, Steel Mill, also produced by Jack Endino. After Willard, Wied created the band Foil.
