= Lisa Fay Beatty =

American punk rock musician (1964–2011)

- Born: October 15, 1964
- Died: November 25, 2011 (aged 47) Mentone, California, US
- Genres: Punk rock
- Occupation: Musician
- Instrument: Guitar
- Label: C/Z

Lisa Fay Beatty (October 15, 1964 – November 25, 2011) was an American musician best known for her involvement in the band 7 Year Bitch. She replaced the guitarist Roisin Dunne in 1997. The band later broke up the same year. She died in a motorcycle accident on November 25, 2011, at the age of 47. Beatty also toured with her band Mudwimin. She sound engineered for bands like The Gits, 7 Year Bitch, and Smoochknob.

Some sources list her as Lisa Faye Beatty, but her own Facebook page spells her name as Lisa Fay. She is acknowledged in the thanks portion of the 2005 film The Gits as Lisa Fae Beatty.

She collaborated with numerous artists including Gossip, Sleepytime Gorilla Museum, and Iggy Pop.

== Discography ==
=== Other Compilations ===
- "Damn Good And Well" on Rough Cuts: The Best Of Rough Trade Publishing, 1991–1995 (Rough Trade Publishing, 1997).
- "Rock-A-Bye Baby" on She's A Rebel (Beloved/Shanachie Records, 1997).
- "Shake Appeal" on We Will Fall: The Iggy Pop Tribute (Royalty Records, 1997).
- "M.I.A." on Whatever: The 90's Pop & Culture Box (Flying Rhino Records/WEA, 2005).
- "The Scratch" on Sleepless in Seattle: The Birth of Grunge (LiveWire Recordings, 2006).

== Filmography ==
- 1995 Not Bad for a Girl: credited as Lisa Fay
- 2005 The Gits: thanked as Lisa Fae Beatty (sic)
