= Live Alien Broadcasts =

Live album by Tad
- Released: January 10, 1995
- Recorded: 1994 at Heart's Bad Animals studio, Seattle
- Genre: Heavy metal, grunge
- Length: 40:01
- Label: Futurist Records
- Producer: Mark Naficy

Tad chronology
Inhaler (1993)	Live Alien Broadcasts (1995)	Infrared Riding Hood (1995)

Professional ratings
Review scores
Source	Rating
Allmusic	2.5/5 stars

Live Alien Broadcasts is the first live album of Seattle band TAD, which was released in 1995.

== Track listing ==
No.	Title	Length
1.	"Throat Locust"	4:29
2.	"Just Bought the Farm"	4:11
3.	"Paregoric"	4:07
4.	"Delinquent"	3:31
5.	"Rotor"	4:11
6.	"Pale Corkscrew"	4:16
7.	"Stumblin' Man"	3:41
8.	"Demon Seed"	4:14
9.	"Sunday Drive"	3:38
10.	"Jack"	3:41

=== Vinyl bonus track ===
No.	Title	Length
11.	"Pale Corkscrew (Studio Version)"	4:20

== Personnel ==
- Tad Doyle - Vocals, Guitar
- Kurt Danielson - Bass, Vocals
- Gary Thorstensen - Guitar, Vocals
- Josh Sinder - Drums
- Mark Naficy - Producer
- Howie Weinberg - Mastering
