= Hype! =

1996 rockumentary directed by Doug Pray

- Official release poster
- Directed by: Doug Pray
- Produced by: Lisanne Dutton; Steven Helvey; Peter J. Vogt
- Starring: Numerous musicians
- Cinematography: Robert Bennett
- Edited by: Doug Pray; Joan Zapata
- Distributed by: Cinepix Film Properties
- Release dates: January 19, 1996 (Sundance); November 8, 1996 (United States)
- Running time: 87 min
- Country: United States
- Language: English

Hype! is a 1996 American documentary film directed by Doug Pray about grunge music in the Pacific Northwest during the early to mid-1990s. The film incorporates interviews and rare concert footage to trace the development of the grunge scene from its early beginnings in neighborhood basements to its emergence as a pop culture phenomenon. The film attempts to dispel some of the myths of the genre promulgated by media hype by depicting it from the point of view of people who were active in the scene. The film portrays this mythos in a satirical way while acknowledging that it was media hype that helped propel many of these obscure bands to fame.

Hype! premiered at the Sundance Film Festival on January 19, 1996, where it was nominated for the Grand Jury Prize for Best Documentary, and was theatrically released in the United States on November 8, 1996.

== Release ==
The film premiered at the Sundance Film Festival on January 19, 1996. It opened in two theaters (one in New York and one in Seattle) on November 8.

== Reception ==
The film holds a 93% rating on Rotten Tomatoes based on 27 reviews with an average rating of 7.5/10.

== Appearances ==
Hype! includes interviews and performances from bands (primarily oriented with the Sub Pop Records axis) such as TAD, Blood Circus, Mudhoney, Nirvana, Soundgarden, Coffin Break, The Gits, Love Battery, Flop, The Melvins, Some Velvet Sidewalk, Mono Men, Supersuckers, Zipgun, Seaweed, Pearl Jam, 7 Year Bitch, Hovercraft, Gas Huffer, and Fastbacks. It also features interviews with band manager Susan Silver, record producers Jack Endino and Steve Fisk, and photographer Charles Peterson.

Along with the DVD that comes with Nirvana's With the Lights Out, it is one of the few films to contain video footage of Nirvana's first performance of their breakthrough hit, "Smells Like Teen Spirit".

In the film, Seattle producer/engineer Jack Endino is humorously referred to as "the godfather of grunge."

== Soundtrack ==
Sub Pop released a soundtrack to the film in 1996 on CD and a limited box set on colored 7" vinyl. AMG entry

== Charts ==
Chart (2017)	Peak position
US Top Music Video Sales (Billboard)	11

== Award ==
- Seattle International Film Festival 1996 : Best Documentary

== See also ==
- 1991: The Year Punk Broke
- Grunge speak
- Hype! The Motion Picture Soundtrack
