= Melvins! (album) =

Melvins

EP by Melvins
- Released: May 1986
- Recorded: February 8, 1986
- Studio: Ironwood Studios, Seattle, Washington
- Genre: Sludge metal; Hardcore punk; Doom metal
- Length: 12:10 (Six Songs); 18:43 (8 Songs); 24:50 (10 Songs); 71:01 (26 Songs)
- Label: C/Z Records; Ipecac
- Producer: Chris Hanzsek

Melvins chronology
Melvins (1986)	Gluey Porch Treatments (1987)

26 Songs album cover

Professional ratings
Review scores
Source	Rating
AllMusic	3/5 stars

Melvins is the debut EP by the American rock band Melvins, released in May 1986 through C/Z Records. The original release was a vinyl 7", commonly referred to as Six Songs. A later edition, taken from an earlier recording session, was released as 10 Songs in 1991 on CD with an equivalent 12" vinyl EP called 8 Songs, which leaves off the last two tracks from the CD.

== Background ==
In 2003, both editions were re-issued together on Ipecac Recordings as 26 Songs on CD with bonus tracks. Tracks 1–10 are taken from the 1991 eight/ten song, LP/CD version rerelease of this album. Tracks 11–16 are taken from the original six song vinyl release. Tracks 17–19 were taken from the 1986 Outtakes From First 7 inch vinyl single (tracks 18 and 19 are the same as tracks 8 and 4, but in inferior quality). Tracks 20–24 are garage demos, track 20 having previously appeared on the Northwest Hardcore compilation tape and track 22 on the Let's Kiss compilation tape from K Records. An alternate version of "Ever Since My Accident" was available on the Kill Rock Stars compilation (KRS-201) in superior quality.

The track listing on the booklet of the CD lists 26 tracks but for unknown reasons the CD only has 25 tracks as "Ever Since My Accident" and "Hugh" are together on track 25 and not individual tracks as credited. "Hugh" is a field recording that had been put out as the b-side of the demo cassettes the band would give away to venues and labels to promote the band.

== Track listing ==
=== "Six Songs" ===
==== Side one ====
1. "Easy as It Was" – 2:33
2. "Now a Limo" – 0:52
3. "Grinding Process" – 2:35

==== Side two ====
1. "At a Crawl" – 3:09
2. "Disinvite" – 1:19
3. "Snake Appeal" – 1:42

=== 8 Songs ===
==== Side one ====
1. "Easy as It Was" – 2:54
2. "Now a Limo" – 0:55
3. "Grinding Process" – 2:37
4. "#2 Pencil" – 3:08

==== Side two ====
1. "At a Crawl" – 3:04
2. "Disinvite" – 1:22
3. "Snake Appeal" – 1:39
4. "Show Off Your Red Hands" – 2:57

=== 10 Songs ===
1. "Easy as It Was" – 2:54
2. "Now a Limo" – 0:55
3. "Grinding Process" – 2:37
4. "#2 Pencil" – 3:08
5. "At a Crawl" – 3:04
6. "Disinvite" – 1:22
7. "Snake Appeal" – 1:39
8. "Show Off Your Red Hands" – 2:57
9. "Over from Underground" – 2:22
10. "Cray Fish" – 3:06

=== 26 Songs ===
1. "Easy as It Was" – 2:54
2. "Now a Limo" – 0:55
3. "Grinding Process" – 2:37
4. "#2 Pencil" – 3:08
5. "At a Crawl" – 3:04
6. "Disinvite" – 1:22
7. "Snake Appeal" – 1:39
8. "Show Off Your Red Hands" – 2:57
9. "Over from Underground" – 2:22
10. "Cray Fish" – 3:06
11. "Easy as It Was" – 2:39
12. "Now a Limo" – 0:53
13. "Grinding Process" – 2:44
14. "At a Crawl" – 3:13
15. "Disinvite" – 1:23
16. "Snake Appeal" – 1:52
17. "Set Me Straight" – 3:09
18. "Show Off Your Red Hands" – 2:57
19. "#2 Pencil" – 3:18
20. "Grinding Process" – 2:17
21. "Snake Appeal" – 1:43
22. "At a Crawl" – 2:52
23. "Operation Blessing" – 0:45
24. "Breakfast on the Sly" – 1:51
25. "Ever Since My Accident / Hugh" – 15:01

== Personnel ==
- Buzz Osborne - guitar, vocals
- Matt Lukin - bass, vocals
- Dale Crover - drums

=== Additional personnel ===
- Chris Hanzsek - producer, engineer
- Krist Novoselic - photographer
- Mackie Osborne - new artwork on 26 Songs rerelease
- Hugh - rapping
