= Salt Lick/God's Balls =

Compilation album by Tad
- Released: April 1990
- Genre: Grunge, alternative metal, alternative rock
- Label: Sub Pop
- Producer: Jack Endino, Steve Albini

Tad chronology
Salt Lick (1990)	Salt Lick/God's Balls (1990)	8-Way Santa (1991)

Professional ratings
Review scores
Source	Rating
Allmusic	3/5 stars

Salt Lick/God's Balls is a CD / cassette-only compilation by the American grunge band TAD. It consists of: the EP Salt Lick; the A-side of the SP55 7‘’ ("Loser" b/w "Cooking with Gas"); 7 selected tracks (out of 10) from the album God's Balls.

Both records had previously been released in the United States only on vinyl. It is currently out of print.

== Track listing ==
Salt Lick EP

1. "Axe to Grind" – 2:10
2. "High on the Hog" – 2:28
3. "Wood Goblins" – 3:13
4. "Hibernation" – 2:56
5. "Glue Machine" – 3:43
6. "Potlatch" – 3:26

SP55 7‘’

7. "Loser" – 3:26

Selection from "God's Balls"

8. "Behemoth" – 4:08
9. "Pork Chop" – 4:19
10. "Helot" – 2:54
11. "Sex God Missy" – 4:26
12. "Cyanide Bath" – 3:35
13. "Boiler Room" – 4:47
14. "Satan's Chainsaw" – 3:10

The 3 tracks from "God's Balls" that didn't make it on this compilation are:

- "Tuna Car"
- "Hollow Man"
- "Nipple Belt"
