= ¡Viva Zapata! =

Studio album by 7 Year Bitch
- Released: May 20, 1994
- Recorded: 1994
- Studio: Avast! Recording Studios (Seattle)
- Genre: Punk rock; grunge
- Length: 32:48
- Label: C/Z
- Producer: Jack Endino; 7 Year Bitch

7 Year Bitch chronology
Sick 'Em (1992)	¡Viva Zapata! (1994)	Gato Negro (1996)

¡Viva Zapata! is the second studio album by American rock band 7 Year Bitch, released on May 20, 1994, through C/Z Records. Produced by Jack Endino, it was their first record with guitarist Roisin Dunne. The album's tone was influenced by the deaths of several people close to the band, including original guitarist Stefanie Sargent in 1992 and The Gits' vocalist Mia Zapata—who inspired its title and is depicted on its cover artwork—in 1993, although this was not intended as its general theme. The album's promotion was supported by Atlantic Records, who signed 7 Year Bitch a month prior to its release.

¡Viva Zapata! received positive reviews from critics, who praised 7 Year Bitch's improved songwriting and Selene Vigil's lyrics. In April 2019, the album was ranked at No. 34 on Rolling Stone's "50 Greatest Grunge Albums" list.

== Background, recording and themes ==
On June 27, 1992, four months before the release of the band's debut album Sick 'Em, 7 Year Bitch guitarist Stefanie Sargent died from drug and alcohol-related asphyxiation. After a six month break following her death, 7 Year Bitch recruited Roisin Dunne as their new guitarist and began touring the United States in 1993, attracting major label interest along the way. The band were getting ready to tour with C/Z Records labelmates The Gits when the latter's vocalist, Mia Zapata, was raped and murdered on July 7, 1993.

¡Viva Zapata! was produced and recorded by Jack Endino at Avast! Recording Studios in Seattle. In contrast to Sick 'Em, the album features a cleaner and more polished sound and tighter, more precise instrumentals and songwriting. Taking notice of their growing popularity, vocalist Selene Vigil said that 7 Year Bitch wanted to "take [their] music as seriously as possible", whilst ensuring that the album was "still going to be fun; otherwise it wouldn't have been 7 Year Bitch".

The deaths of Zapata, Sargent, and other people close to the band would largely inform the album's tone—with the former two being addressed directly in the songs "M.I.A." (which calls for vigilante justice against Zapata's killer in the face of authorities' lack of action) (Note: In a 1994 interview with the Los Angeles Times, bassist Elizabeth Davis said: "[Mia's murder] stunned us. It's something we feel and deal with every day because (the killer) still hasn't been caught. It's something still very much in the forefront of our heads." Zapata's killer, Jesus Mezquia, would not be arrested until 2003.) and "Rock A Bye", respectively. Despite this, 7 Year Bitch did not intend for their deaths to be the album's general theme. Vigil said of ¡Viva Zapata!'s lyrical content: "We didn't go into the album with the idea of us making a record about all of these bad things. Every song came up and it was written about what we were thinking about at the time." Bassist Elizabeth Davis additionally described the album as "kind of a death-obsessed record, but it's not because we're being morose or macabre or anything. It's a tribute. And it's a very personal thing, a very closed, private thing, even though it's a record—a public thing."

== Release and promotion ==
¡Viva Zapata! was released through C/Z Records on May 20, 1994. Around a month prior to the album's release, 7 Year Bitch signed with the major label Atlantic Records, who assisted with its promotion. (Note: Roisin Dunne said that while 7 Year Bitch did not want ¡Viva Zapata! to be their debut for Atlantic, it was to "their advantage to get things done properly, before [the band] put a record out".) The label became interested in the band after Courtney Love recommended them to label president Danny Goldberg. The album was briefly in talks of being released through Atlantic due to C/Z experiencing financial difficulties in early 1994, but was ultimately released through C/Z after label head Daniel House managed to convince pressing plants to "cut him some slack in order to get out enough copies to meet demand". C/Z was also reported to have avoided bankruptcy as a result of their signing to Atlantic.

7 Year Bitch promoted the album's release with a month-long club tour of the United States. In July 1994, the band were shot performing "The Scratch" in Seattle for the 1995 film Mad Love; the song, along with "Icy Blue", was also featured in the movie's soundtrack album. In August 1994, 7 Year Bitch filmed a music video in Seattle for "Hip Like Junk", produced and directed by Duncan Sharp.

== Critical reception ==
Professional ratings
Review scores
Source	Rating
AllMusic	4.5/5 stars
Chicago Tribune	3.5/4 stars
Christgau's Consumer Guide	(neither)
The Encyclopedia of Popular Music	3/5 stars
Entertainment Weekly	A
Los Angeles Times	3/4 stars
Rolling Stone	3.5/5 stars
Select	2/5 stars
Spin	1/1 star

¡Viva Zapata! received positive reviews from critics. Arion Berger of Rolling Stone gave the album a positive review: "Fast, funny and never completely satisfied, 7 Year Bitch epitomize [punk rock] and make noise like nobody else." AllMusic critic Steve Huey praised the band's improved songwriting and musicianship, stating: "7 Year Bitch hasn't lost an ounce of passion [...] they've just learned how to channel it better." Lorraine Ali, writing for the Los Angeles Times, positively noted the album's rhythm section: "Deep bass lines come off as enigmatic, then as menacing, making the tunes stick in the subconscious, while a jagged, buzzing guitar lends a rough edge." In a less positive review for The Advocate, Barry Walters opined that 7 Year Bitch were "essentially L7 without the tunes."

Spin's Natasha Stovall praised Vigil's lyrics for avoiding "textbook feminism", writing: "While other female bands adopt a lesbian frame of reference as an extension of their rage at men, the members of 7 Year Bitch rock like straight women: The object of their disdain and the object of their desire are often one and the same." Similarly, Entertainment Weekly's Deborah Frost praised its "screech-free feminism" as "rather revolutionary". Greg Kot of the Chicago Tribune felt that the album resonated with "[the] harsh reality [of Sargent and Zapata's deaths] and, in song after song, transcends it."

In April 2019, the album was ranked at No. 34 on Rolling Stone's "50 Greatest Grunge Albums" list. Likewise, in October 2022, Pitchfork included the album in their list of "The 25 Best Grunge Albums of the '90s". "The Scratch" was ranked at No. 48 on Paste's list of "The 50 Best Grunge Songs", whilst Guitar World ranked it at No. 29 on their list of "The 30 greatest grunge guitar riffs".

== Track listing ==
All lyrics are written by Selene Vigil; all music is composed by Elizabeth Davis, except where noted.

No.	Title	Lyrics	Music	Length
1.	"The Scratch"			1:59
2.	"Hip Like Junk"			3:50
3.	"M.I.A."			3:54
4.	"Derailed"			3:11
5.	"Cat's Meow"			3:54
6.	"Rock A Bye"			2:39
7.	"It's Too Late" (The Jim Carroll Band cover)	Jim Carroll	Jim Carroll	2:39
8.	"Damn Good and Well"			1:59
9.	"Kiss My Ass Goodbye"			2:53
10.	"Icy Blue"			3:57
11.	"Get Lit"		Roisin Dunne	1:53
Total length:				32:48

== Personnel ==
Adapted from liner notes.

7 Year Bitch

- Selene Vigil – vocals
- Roisin Dunne – guitar
- Elizabeth Davis – bass
- Valerie Agnew – drums

Production

- Jack Endino – production, recording
- 7 Year Bitch – production

Artwork

- Scott Musgrove – cover painting
- Mia Zapata – back cover painting (photographed by Klaus Zach)
- Jackie Ransier – photograph of Mia Zapata
