= Willard (band) =

American metal band

Background information
- Origin: Seattle, Washington, U.S.
- Genres: Grunge, doom metal, sludge metal, alternative metal
- Years active: 1989–1995
- Labels: Green Gel, Roadrunner, Black Guitar
- Past members: Johnny Clint; Mark Spiders; Otis P. Otis; Steve Wied; Darren Peters; Tyson Garcia

Willard was an American metal band from Seattle, Washington, formed around 1989. They were a part of the grunge music scene of the late 1980s and early 1990s.

== History ==
Mark Spiders, Otis P. Otis, and Darren Peters were in a band named Sunshine alongside vocalist Faye West and drummer Patty Schemel. They self-released one EP in 1989, Spread the Love, followed by a disbandment. Schemel would later go on to join the band Hole while Spiders, Otis, and Peters formed Willard. The lineup was expanded with Johnny Clint on vocals and Steve Wied, who departed from the band Tad shortly after joining Willard, on drums. Otis was also an early member of Napalm Beach while Clint and Peters played in H-Hour.

Willard initially released a self-titled EP on Green Gel Records in 1991. Jeff Gilbert and Tad Doyle were then instrumental in Willard's record deal with Roadrunner Records, which resulted in the Steel Mill album in 1992, produced by Jack Endino. Gilbert called Willard the "drunkest band in Seattle" in his Rocket article. They toured alongside bands such as White Zombie, Cannibal Corpse, and the Melvins (another band which drew comparisons to Willard). After performing an outdoor show for the "Pain in the Grass" Festival at the Seattle Center, Willard was banned from further performances by the Seattle Police Department and the City of Seattle, resulting in band shirts displaying "Banned by the SPD".

Willard recorded eleven songs in November 1993, followed by the departure of Peters. He was replaced on bass by Tyson Garcia. The band drastically reduced their activity, and the recorded tracks were not released. They eventually disbanded in 1995. The songs from November 1993 were eventually transferred from 2" tape to digital by Stuart Hallerman at Avast!. Guitarist Spiders and Aaron Skok mixed the songs, and Black Guitar Records published the album, Underground, in 2018. Otis and Spiders eventually joined the band Smoke It and See, alongside two members of Green Apple Quick Step (vocalist/bassist Mari Ann Braeden and drummer Geoff Reading).

== Band members ==
- Johnny Clint – vocals (1989–1995)
- Mark Spiders – guitars (1989–1995)
- Otis P. Otis – guitars (1989–1995)
- Steve Wied – drums (1989–1995)
- Darren Peters – bass (1989–1994)
- Tyson Garcia – bass (1994–1995)

== Discography ==
Full releases

- Willard EP (Green Gel Records, 1991)
- Steel Mill (Roadrunner Records, 1992)
- Underground (Black Guitar Records, 2018)

Appearances

- Roadrunner Records Promo PR063 features "Sweet Kali" (Roadrunner Records, 1992)
- Metal Detector CD Metal Monsters features "Stain" (FMBQ, 1992)
- Best of Grunge Rock features "Fifteen" (Priority Records, 1993)
- Seattle Music Scene Volume 2 features demo version of "Larry" from ABV Sessions (Insight Records, 1994)
