= Busted Circuits and Ringing Ears =

Video by Tad
- Released: February 13, 2008
- Genre: Documentary
- Length: 93 min.
- Producer: Ryan Short; Adam Pease

Professional ratings
Review scores
Source	Rating
Allmusic	4/5 stars

Busted Circuits and Ringing Ears is a 2008 documentary detailing the career of Seattle-based band Tad. It was screened at the Varsity Theater in the University District on February 13, 2008, and released for DVD on February 19.

Various band members, such as Krist Novoselic of Nirvana, Kim Thayil of Soundgarden, and Mark Arm of Mudhoney are featured.
