= Alcohol Funnycar =

American rock band

Alcohol Funnycar was an American rock band from Seattle, Washington. They were primarily active from 1991 to 1997.

== History ==
The band was formed in 1991 by Ben London, an Ohio native, in Seattle. Bassist Tommy "Bonehead" Simpson was a former member of Love Battery and Crisis Party. The band's original drummer was Steve Moriarty, but after a few shows, Moriarty left the band to focus on The Gits. He was initially replaced by Andhi Witherspoon. Alcohol Funnycar released their debut single in 1992 on Rathouse Records (an untitled single with the tracks "Pretense" and "Drive By"). The single was recorded with Jack Endino. In September 1992, Witherspoon moved to Europe, and thus Buzz Crocker (former member of the Seattle band Vexed) replaced him.

After releasing a two-song single on the label New Rage, the band signed to C/Z Records. They released an EP, Burn, in March 1993. The full-length album Time to Make the Donuts followed in December 1993. The album notably peaked at No. 56 on the CMJ Top 150 chart. "Shapes" was the lead single from Time to Make the Donuts, and it was also featured in the film Brainscan in addition to its soundtrack. A music video was made for "Shapes" as well. Around the same time, Joel Trueblood (from The Untamed Youth) replaced Crocker on drums.

The band's final album, Weasels, appeared in October 1995. Although the band was still with C/Z Records, Weasels received additional distribution with the major label Zoo Entertainment. "Overtaken" off of Weasels notably appeared on a compilation by the anti-violence organization Home Alive (distributed by Epic Records). Alcohol Funnycar then formally disbanded in 1997. London was featured in the books Everybody Loves Our Town by Mark Yarm and Grunge Is Dead by Greg Prato, as he detailed his time in the band. Simpson was also featured in Grunge Is Dead. Throughout the subsequent years, the band reunited for various one-off shows. In 2020, London and Simpson reconnected during the COVID-19 pandemic, and released the first Alcohol Funnycar song in years, titled "Someday". A music video was filmed for the track as well, which featured dozens of Seattle businesses that were impacted by the pandemic. In 2026, Paste named the video for "Someday" one of the "Ten Best Grunge Videos of All Time".

== Members ==
- Ben London – vocals, guitar (1991–1997)
- Tommy "Bonehead" Simpson – bass (1991–1997)
- Steve Moriarty – drums (1991)
- Andhi Witherspoon – drums (1991–1992)
- Buzz Crocker – drums (1992–1993)
- Joel Trueblood – drums (1993–1997)

== Discography ==
Studio albums

- Burn (1993, C/Z Records)
- Time to Make the Donuts (1993, C/Z Records)
- Weasels (1995, C/Z Records)

Singles

- "Pretense"/"Drive By" (1992, Rathouse Records)
- "All About It"/"Complications" (1993, New Rage)
- "Shapes" (1994, Ruffhouse Records)
- "Someday" (2020, Independent)

Other appearances

- Four on the Floor (1993, C/Z Records)
- Power Flush: San Francisco, Seattle & You (1993, Broken Rekkids/Rathouse Records)
- Brainscan (1994, Ruffhouse Records/Columbia Records)
- Notes From the Underground 1 (1995, Priority Records)
- West x North-South (1995, Vagrant Records)
- Home Alive: The Art of Self Defense (1996, Epic Records)
- C/Z Records Unreleased Singles (2011, C/Z Records)
