= 7 Year Bitch =

American punk rock band (1990–1997)

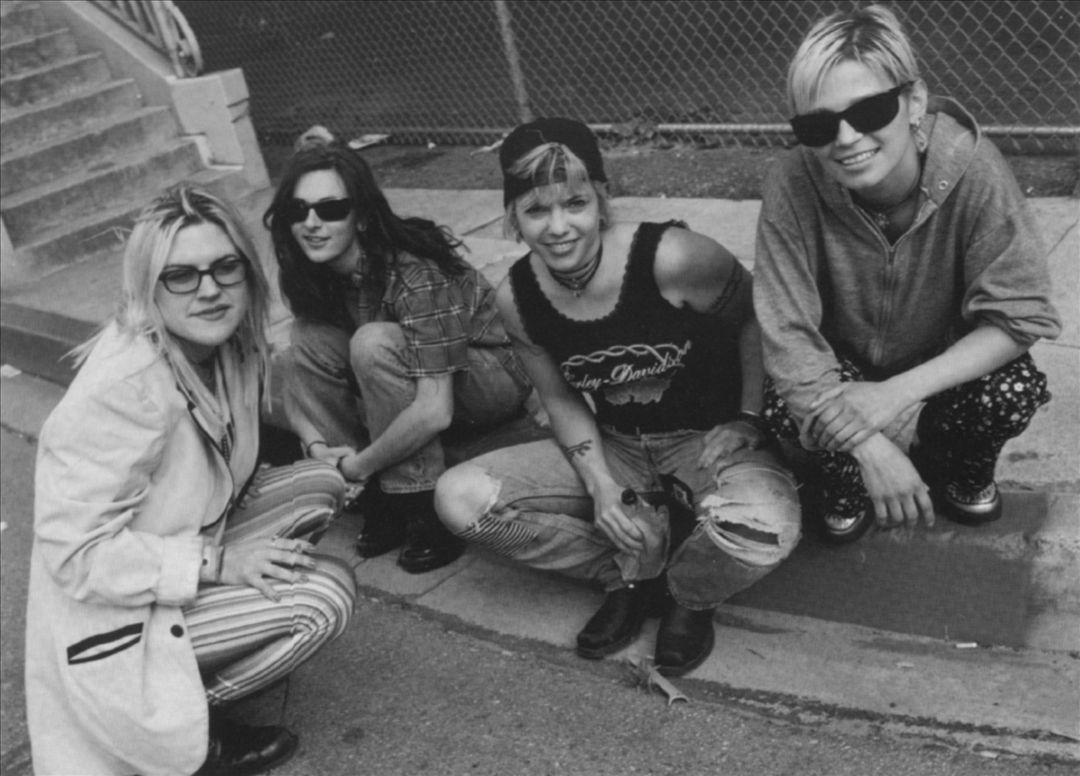
- 7 Year Bitch in 1994

Background information
- Origin: Seattle, Washington, U.S.
- Genres: Punk rock; riot grrrl; grunge
- Years active: 1990–1997
- Labels: C/Z; Atlantic; Man's Ruin
- Past members: Selene Vigil; Elizabeth Davis; Valerie Agnew; Stefanie Sargent; Roisin Dunne; Lisa Fay Beatty

7 Year Bitch was an American punk rock band from Seattle, Washington, formed in 1990. The band was founded by vocalist Selene Vigil, along with bassist Elizabeth Davis, drummer Valerie Agnew, and guitarist Stefanie Sargent, who died in 1992 and was replaced by Roisin Dunne. 7 Year Bitch released three studio albums: Sick 'Em (1992), ¡Viva Zapata! (1994), and Gato Negro (1996), before disbanding in 1997. Shortly before the band broke up, Dunne quit and was replaced by Lisa Fay Beatty. The band is often grouped in with the riot grrrl scene.

== Biography ==
=== Career ===
7 Year Bitch was formed in 1990 by vocalist Selene Vigil, bassist Elizabeth Davis, drummer Valerie Agnew, and guitarist Stefanie Sargent. Vigil, Agnew, and Sargent had been playing together in the band Barbie's Dream Car when their bassist left for Europe. They subsequently recruited Davis and renamed their band after the movie The Seven Year Itch, based on a suggestion by their friend Ben London, the lead vocalist of Alcohol Funnycar.

At their first concert, the band opened for The Gits, who would prove to have a significant influence on their music. The two bands became longtime friends, with Sargent and Gits lead vocalist Mia Zapata becoming particularly close. In 1991, the band released their first single "Lorna" and signed with C/Z Records. Their first album, Sick 'Em, was released in October 1992, which was postponed from its scheduled release after Sargent died from asphyxiation on June 27. Unbeknownst to the rest of the band, Sargent had been struggling with heroin addiction and was sober for eight months before relapsing. She passed out on her back and choked on her vomit after returning home from a party where she had consumed alcohol and heroin. Following a period of grieving and uncertainty, the band decided to continue, recruiting Roisin Dunne as Sargent's replacement later that year.

On the morning of July 7, 1993, Zapata was raped and murdered while walking home from the Comet Tavern. Zapata's murder, coupled with Sargent's death the previous year, had a profound effect on the band and the underground music scene, with most of the bands breaking up as a result. In May 1994, the band released their second album, ¡Viva Zapata!, as a tribute to both Sargent and Zapata. Agnew co-founded the anti-violence organization Home Alive to address the prevalence of violence against women.

On April 8, 1994, the band played a benefit show for Rock Against Domestic Violence at the Cameo Theatre in Miami, alongside Babes in Toyland and Jack Off Jill, the same day Nirvana lead vocalist Kurt Cobain had been found dead in his Seattle home. In 1995, the band signed with Atlantic Records and in March 1996, they released their third and final album, Gato Negro. Following the tour supporting Gato Negro, Dunne quit and was replaced by Lisa Fay Beatty, the band's live sound engineer and longtime friend.

=== Break-up ===
In 1997, the band began recording material for what was to be their fourth album. The band moved from Seattle to California, Davis and Agnew to San Francisco, and Vigil to Los Angeles. With the recent departure of Dunne and the geographical separation between bandmates, they disbanded after a final tour with Lost Goat. The break-up was, fittingly, seven years after their formation, mirroring the popular belief of the "seven-year itch".

=== Aftermath ===
Davis joined the band Clone, with whom she performed until 2003. In 2005, she co-founded the band Von Iva, which have since broken up. Beatty became involved with filmography, played for the band Smoochknob, and held a solo act called Elfay. She opened for the band Sleepytime Gorilla Museum. Vigil formed the gothic psychedelic band Cistine in 2000. She later released her debut solo album That Was Then in 2010, followed by Tough Dance in 2017. Dunne joined the band The Last Goodbye in 2006.

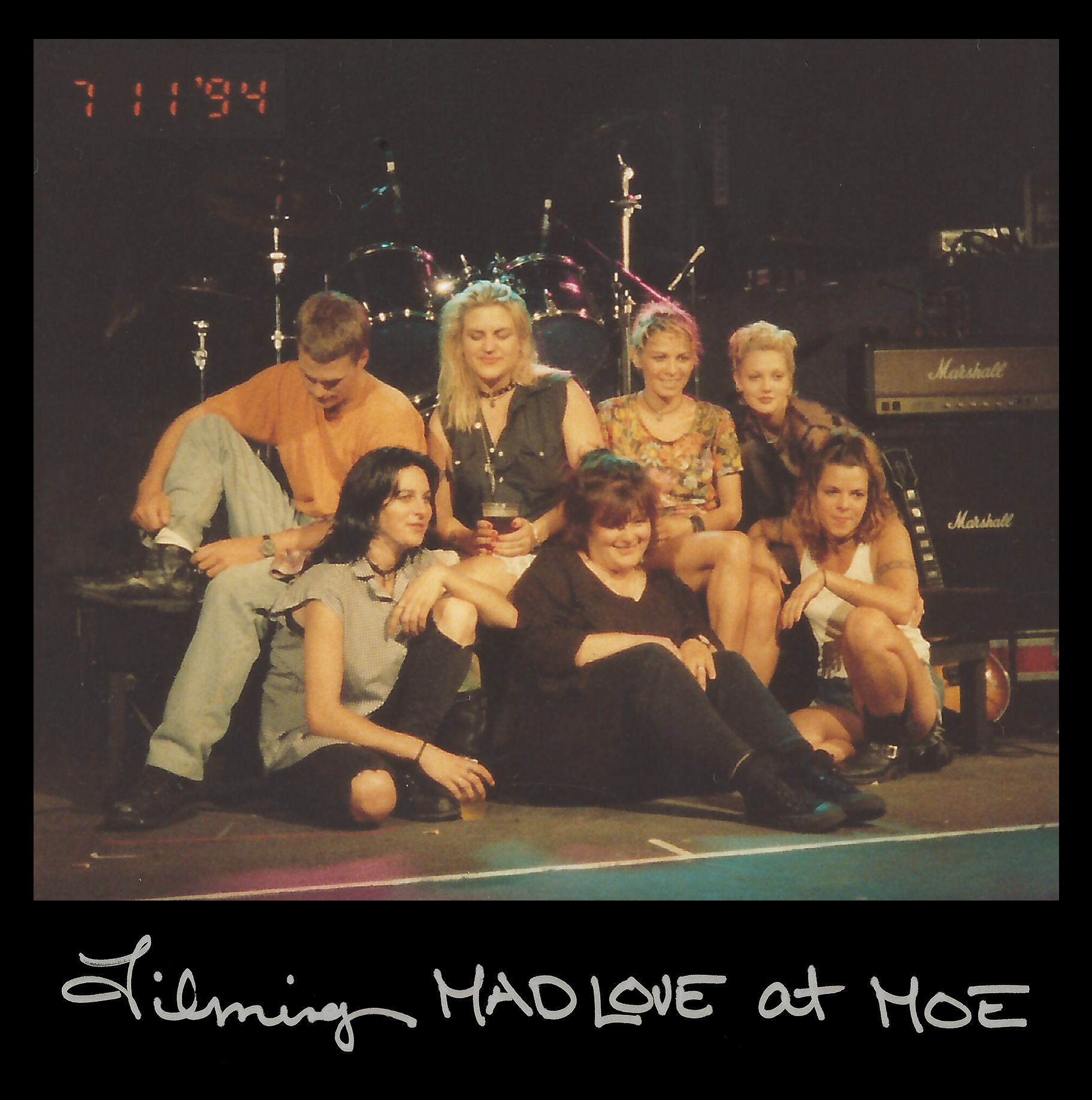
7 Year Bitch during a break in the filming of the movie Mad Love at Club Moe in Seattle, with Drew Barrymore and Chris O'Donnell (July 11, 1994)

Their songs "The Scratch" and "Icy Blue" were featured in the movie Mad Love (1995) with Drew Barrymore and Chris O'Donnell.

== Band members ==
=== Final lineup ===
- Selene Vigil – vocals (1990–1997)
- Elizabeth Davis – bass (1990–1997)
- Valerie Agnew – drums (1990–1997)
- Lisa Fay Beatty – guitar (1996–1997; died 2011)

=== Former members ===
- Stefanie Sargent – guitar (1990–1992; died 1992)
- Roisin Dunne – guitar (1992–1996)

== Discography ==
=== Albums ===
- Sick 'Em (C/Z Records, 1992)
- ¡Viva Zapata! (C/Z Records, 1994)
- Gato Negro (Atlantic Records, 1996)
- Live at Moe (Moe Recordings, 2016)

=== Singles/EPs ===
- "Lorna" / "No Fucking War", "You Smell Lonely" (Rathouse/Face The Music Records), (1991; reissued by C/Z Records in 1992)
- "Antidisestablishmentarianism EP" (Rugger Bugger Records, 1992)
- "7 Year Bitch" / "Thatcher On Acid" "Can We Laugh Now?" / "No Fucking War" (Clawfist Records, 1992)
- "7 Year Bitch EP" (C/Z Records, 1992)
- "Rock-A-Bye Baby" / "Wide Open Trap" (C/Z Records, 1994)
- "Miss Understood" / "Go!" (Man's Ruin, 1996)

=== Compilation appearances ===
- "8-Ball Deluxe" on Kill Rock Stars (CD version, Kill Rock Stars, 1992)
- "Dead Men Don't Rape" on There's A Dyke In The Pit (Outpunk/Harp, 1992)
- "The Scratch" on Power Flush: San Francisco, Seattle & You (Rathouse/Broken Rekids, 1993)
- "Dead Men Don't Rape" on Progression (Progression, 1994) [As Seven Year Bitch]
- "The Scratch," "Icy Blue" on the Mad Love Motion Picture Soundtrack (Zoo, 1995)
- "Kiss My Ass Goodbye" on Seattle Women In Rock: A Diverse Collection (Insight, 1995)
- "Damn Good And Well" on Space Mountain (Rough Trade Publishing, 1995)
- "M.I.A." on Notes From The Underground, Vol. 2 (Priority, 1995)
- "24,900 Miles An Hour" on Core (Volume One) (WEA, 1996)
- "24,900 Mile An Hour" on Madhouse Archives Secretos (Warner Music Argentina/WEA/Madhouse, 1996)
- "The History Of My Future" on Sperminator (AWA, 1996)
- "24,900 Miles An Hour" on hu H 23 (Huh Music Service, 1996)
- "Mad Dash" on Home Alive: The Art Of Self-Defense (Epic, 1996)
- "Knot (Live)" on Hype! The Motion Picture Soundtrack (Sub Pop, 1996)
- "Damn Good And Well" on Rough Cuts: The Best Of Rough Trade Publishing, 1991–1995 (Rough Trade Publishing, 1997)
- "Rock-A-Bye Baby" on She's A Rebel (Beloved/Shanachie, 1997)
- "Shake Appeal" on We Will Fall: The Iggy Pop Tribute (Royalty, 1997)
- "M.I.A." on Whatever: The 90's Pop & Culture Box (Flying Rhino/WEA, 2005)
- "The Scratch" on Sleepless in Seattle: The Birth of Grunge (LiveWire Recordings, 2006)
- "8 Ball Deluxe" on Kill Rock Stars/Stars Kill Rock/Rock Stars Kill (Kill Rock Stars, 2013)
- "Chow Down" on Teen Spirit (Mojo Presents 15 Noise -Filled Classics From The American Underground Scene 1989-1992 (Mojo Magazine, 2017)

=== Music videos ===
- "In Lust You Trust" (1992)
- "Hip Like Junk" (1994)
- "24,900 Miles Per Hour" (1996)
- "In Lust Up Trust", Hip Like Junk" - 3 Years Ago Today VHS (C/Z, 1998) [various artist compilation]
