= Steel Mill (album) =

Studio album by Willard
- Released: July 21, 1992
- Recorded: March 1992 at Avast Recording
- Genres: Alternative metal; grunge; doom metal; sludge metal
- Length: 50:56
- Label: Roadrunner
- Producer: Jack Endino

Steel Mill is the debut studio album by the American grunge band Willard.

== Track listing ==
All music and lyrics by Willard, except for "Folsom" written by Johnny Cash.

1. "Fifteen" – 4:48
2. "Seasick" – 4:02
3. "Sweet Kali" – 4:39
4. "No Confession" – 3:15
5. "Steel Mill" – 5:08
6. "Monotony" – 3:24
7. "Stain" – 3:50
8. "High Moon" – 5:25
9. "Hod" – 4:09
10. "Double Dragon" – 4:00
11. "Folsom" – 3:55
12. "Water Sports" – 4:21

== Personnel ==
- Johnny Clint – vocals
- Otis P. Otis – guitar
- Darren Peters – bass
- Mark Spiders – guitar
- Steve Wied – drums, percussion
- Tad Doyle – background vocals ("Stain")

Additional Personnel

- Jack Endino – engineer, mixing, producer
- Alison Braun – art direction, photography
- Monte Conner – A&R
