= Home Alive =

Seattle-based anti-violence organization

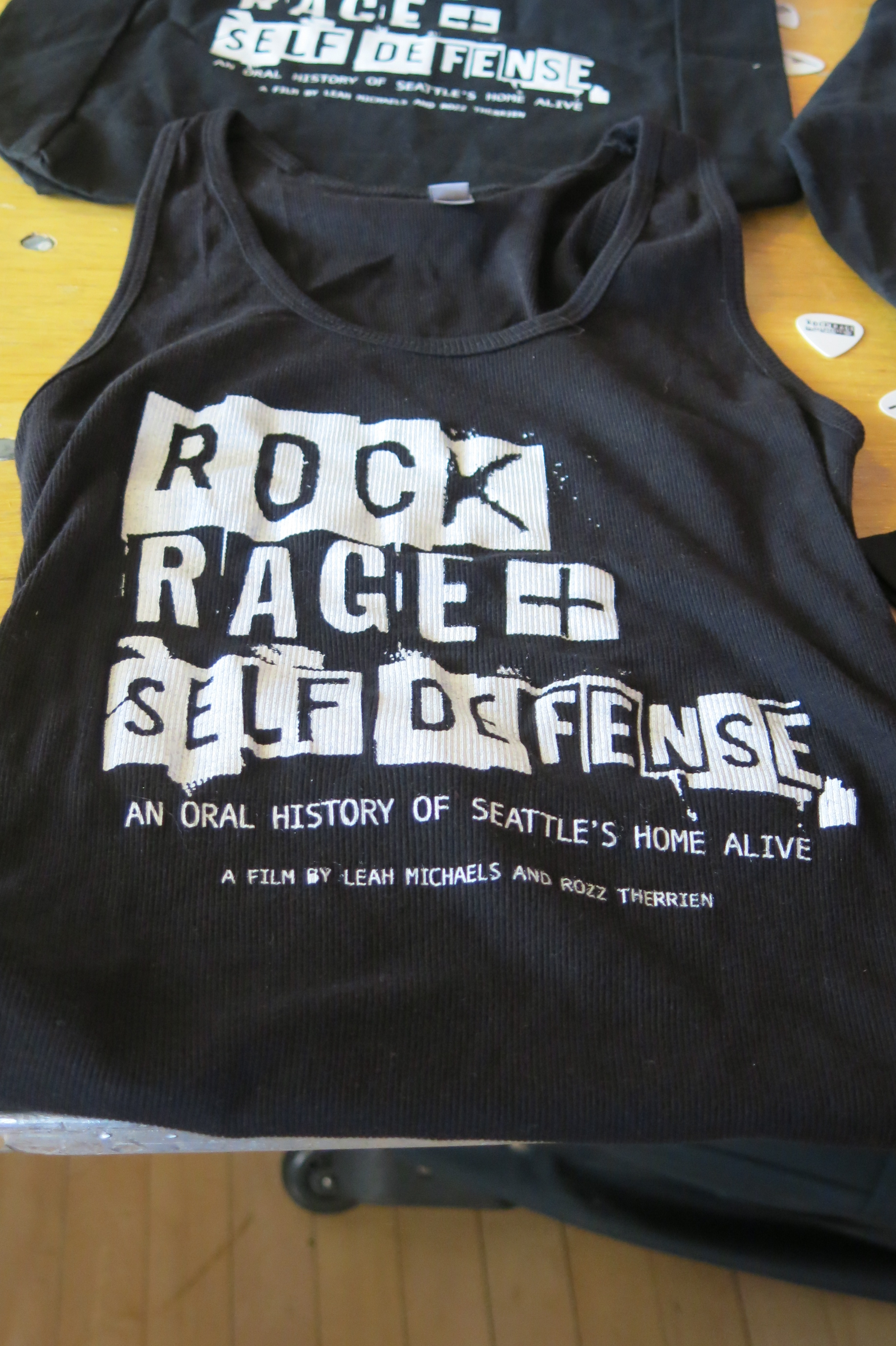
From the Women (un)Conference in Seattle, Washington

Home Alive is a Seattle-based anti-violence organization that offers self-defense classes on a sliding scale payment system. Home Alive once operated as a non-profit organization and now continues to operate as a volunteer collective. Home Alive sees its work as integrated into larger social justice movements, recognizing how violence is often perpetuated through oppression and abuse. Home Alive classes included basic physical self-defense, boundary setting, and advanced multi-week courses.

== History ==
Following the rape and murder of local singer Mia Zapata in July 1993, a number of women from the Seattle music scene began to meet and discuss the prevalence of violence against women within the community, and the lack of available resources such as self-defense classes, which were considered impractical and unaffordable. These informal meetings sparked heated arguments in the living rooms of those involved, as the group had trouble deciding how to organize and agree on the best methods of training to teach, so they chose to bring in teachers to help direct the course of their learning.

This group of women, now recognized as the founders of the organization, put together benefit concerts in order to raise funds and study self-defense. Classes were originally provided to the community for free, but then later on a sliding scale basis. This change occurred because the founders were advised not to offer the classes for free because attendees would not value the class if they did not pay for it, though no one was turned away due to lack of funds. The group continues this work, providing classes to individuals as before, but expanding to also educate establishments such as schools and businesses. With primary support still coming from the arts community, Home Alive continues to ground its self-defense education in a movement for social justice.

The organization offers tools, not rules, to everyone seeking more safety and connection in their lives. They promote consensual behavior, and believe that we all have a responsibility to respect each other's boundaries and right to self-determination. Home Alive taught not only physical self-defense but as well verbal boundaries like saying "no" when feeling uncomfortable, escape route techniques and much others including going to a therapist, writing in a journal, talking to friends and exercising. For the organization, self-defense meant to do anything to make oneself feel strong and be able to take care of oneself in order to feel safer. Home Alive moved to the Capitol Hill district in 2004.

On June 14, 2010, members of Home Alive's Board of Directors, together with the instructor collective, decided to close as a 501(c)(3) organization and to lay the Home Alive program dormant after 17 years in the community. They announced their decision to close in an email sent out to the Home Alive and Capitol Hill community, choosing to celebrate their years of work with an all ages party at Hidmo Eritrean cuisine featuring live music and an open mic. Home Alive included suggestions for other self-defense organizations in the wake of their closure such as INCITE! Women of Color Against Violence and Northwest Network as well as others.

Deactivation occurred because of how difficult it was to maintain a non-profit structure for the organization, as well as finding space and funding. Members also found it difficult to maintain consistent leadership for the group, causing it to fall into disorganization. Consequently, they decided to move away from the formalized government structure of a non-profit and instead chose to create a website teaching self-defense. The website includes all of the curriculum and became volunteer-based.

Since 2010, they have strayed away from the non-profit aspect of the organization and instead formed a small, loosely functioning volunteer collective. They also teach a handful of classes at high schools and for other progressive organizations. On July 3, 2012, four Home Alive instructors, with the assistance of a few dedicated community members, launched a new website, Teach Home Alive, a site dedicated to archiving and sharing Home Alive's curriculum.

== Benefit shows ==
Many live music venues in Seattle, San Francisco, and New York organized shows to benefit Home Alive, where there would be music and spoken word performances. These performances were put on by a variety of people including bands, such as The Posies, and founders of Home Alive, such as Christien Storm, who performed spoken word, Valerie Agnew, who performed with her band 7 Year Bitch, and Gretta Harley, who performed with her band Maxi Bad. The first show took place at Seattle venue, RKCNDY (also known as Rock Candy). During these shows organizers and volunteers would talk about Home Alive and there would be tables with information about Home Alive, as well. In addition to being fundraisers for Home Alive, these benefit shows were also used as a "[way] to bring the music and arts communities together around tragedy, violence, and oppression" to "find ways to proactively address these issues." While funds from the shows went towards providing self-defense classes, it did not always go directly to Home Alive. In the case of shows put on in February and March 1996, the money was put into a bank account with the intent of inspiring other organizations to provide self-defense classes, which would be supported using funds from the bank account. If no one used the money within one year, it would be "donated to women's shelters in the communities where the shows [took] place."

In more current events, partial proceeds from Capitol Hill Block Party in 2008 were also donated to Home Alive as well as in 2006 and 2007. In 2008 the University of Washington put on a performance of the Vagina Monologues, and the proceeds from the show went the organization.

== CD and contributions ==
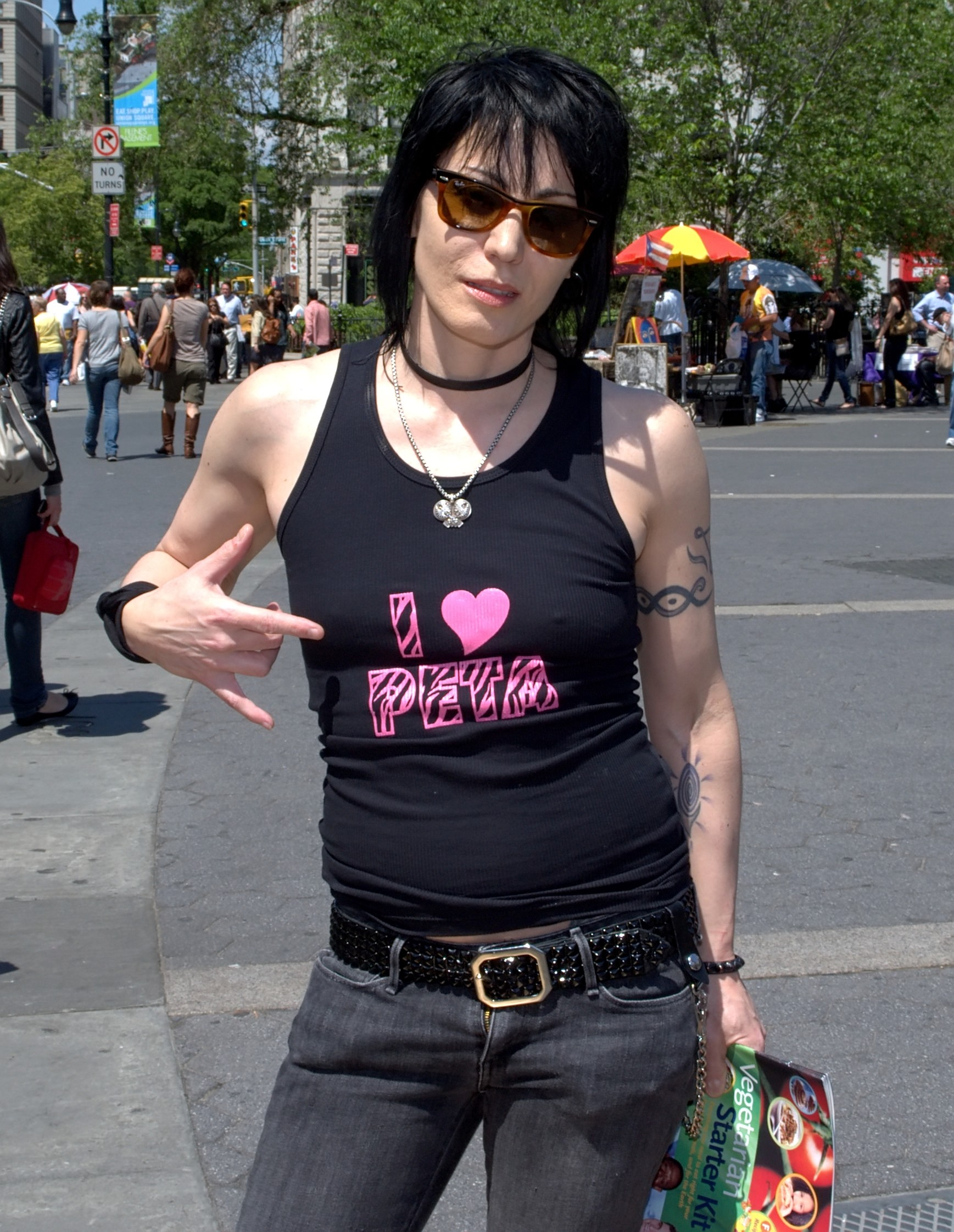
Joan Jett, contributor to Home Alive

Home Alive took hold by spreading the word to the community by making posters, zines, and newsletters. They organized benefit concerts, taught classes, and wrote the curriculum for the organization. As well they compiled a CD called Home Alive: the Art of Self Defense which included 44 tracks from various artists. The CD label was produced by Sony. Co-founder Gretta Harley was instrumental in helping produce the album. The CD included songs of empowerment, self-awareness, and experiences with violence. The artists included many Seattle local bands who wanted to contribute like Nirvana, Pearl Jam, and Soundgarden. The CD compilation gained recognition worldwide. Kathleen Hanna, lead singer of the Seattle punk band Bikini Kill and kick-starter of the Riot grrrl feminist movement, also appears on the album. The track Leaving Here on the album, covered by Pearl Jam, peaked as 24th in Mainstream Rock and 31st in Modern Rock Tracks on Billboard Singles in 1996.

In 2001, Home Alive released a second compilation album titled Flying Side Kick. The album features 17 tracks from various artists including The Gossip, Amy Ray and the Butchies, The Need, the Pinkos, Sanford Arms and more. Proceeds from album sales went to Home Alive.

Home Alive has received support from Joan Jett through a collaboration with Mia Zapata's former bandmates, The Gits. They performed, with Joan Jett as lead singer, under the name Evil Stig with proceeds benefitting Home Alive.

== Documentary ==
Rock, Rage & Self Defense: An Oral History on Seattle's Home Alive, a documentary on the collective, was released in 2013. It was a documentary by Rozz Therrien and Leah Michaels, two then-undergraduates at the University of Washington. Therrien graduated with a degree in American Ethnic Studies and Michaels graduated with a Bachelor of Arts in History. Originally just seeking information for class, they came together to create an oral history about the group Home Alive and did not find a lot of information on the Internet. Both Therrien and Michaels did not have any technical background in filmmaking and self-taught each other technical skills. They fundraised $10,000 to make the film in sound editing and to pay off legal fees through the Kickstarter campaign, grants and donations. In 2014 Therrien and Michaels are on tour screening their documentary across the country, and have recently shown support for the feminist movement YesAllWomen on their website in light of the 2014 Isla Vista killings. The creators hosted screenings of the documentary to various cities across the United States, and completed their last screening of their first tour on May 27, 2014. This raised awareness across the country about self-defense and the history of Home Alive.

== Founders ==
The nine people considered responsible for founding the organization are:

- Valerie Agnew
- Zoe Bermet
- Gretta Harley
- Julie Hasse
- Lara Kidoguchi
- Jessica Lawless
- Mich Levy
- Cristien Storm
- Stacey Wescott

== Founder statements ==
Cristien Storm (one of the co-founders of Home Alive) stated that when they began the process of their band, everyone she knew was in a band and everyone supported each other throughout the community. Young women made their music as art with a sense of feminism.

Home Alive was created to demonstrate a sense of political activism, not just about going to shows and creating music. The bands supported each other and demonstrated collaboration and support through music.

Cristien Storm also said that the combination of all the events and experience that they have in their lives contributed to Home Alive. She implied that the murder of Mia Zapata was not the only event that shaped Home Alive, although it is described that way.

Zapata's death led to the organization of a collective community, which evolved into Home Alive and the mission to provide affordable self-defense training, education tools and grassroots activism.

"Most of the courses we found were quite expensive. and what they taught made no sense to us. We're musicians, artists, actors; we work in establishments late at night. They were telling us to change our lives." The group created their own agenda with unconventional classes to cater to people with backgrounds similar to their own.
