= Roisin Dunne =

Irish musician (born 1965)

- Born: 18 September 1965 (age 60)
- Origin: Ireland
- Genres: Grunge, punk rock
- Occupation: Musician
- Instrument: Guitar
- Years active: 1990–present
- Labels: C/Z Records, Atlantic Records

Roisin Dunne Ross (born 18 September 1965) is an Irish musician. She is best known for being the replacement guitarist of 7 Year Bitch, after their guitarist Stefanie Sargent died in June 1992.

Ross played on the 7 Year Bitch albums ¡Viva Zapata! and Gato Negro with Atlantic Records. She eventually left the band to pursue other opportunities.

== Discography ==
=== Albums ===
- ¡Viva Zapata! (C/Z Records, 1994).
- Gato Negro (Atlantic Records, 1996).

=== Singles ===
- "Rock-A-Bye Baby" b/w "Wide Open Trap" (C/Z Records, 1994).
- "The History of My Future" b/w "24,900 Miles Per Hour" (promo only) (Atlantic Records, 1996).
- "Miss Understood" b/w "Go!" (Man's Ruin, 1996).

=== Music Videos ===
- "In Lust You Trust" (1992)
- "Hip Like Junk" (1994)
- "24,900 Miles Per Hour" (1996)

=== Films ===
- The Gits: Movie (2005)
