= Infrared Riding Hood =

Studio album by Tad
- Released: April 11, 1995
- Studio: Robert Lang (Seattle)
- Genres: Grunge; alternative metal
- Length: 58:32
- Label: East West/Elektra
- Producer: Jack Endino

Tad chronology
Inhaler (1993)	Infrared Riding Hood (1995)

Infrared Riding Hood is the fourth and final studio album by the American rock band Tad, released in 1995 on EastWest/Elektra Records. It was the follow-up to their major label debut, Inhaler.

== Production ==
The album was produced by Jack Endino. Due to the departure of founding guitarist Gary Thorstensen, frontman Tad Doyle played all of the guitar parts.

== Release ==
Despite enthusiasm and hopes for a long-awaited commercial breakthrough, their A&R representative was fired, and within one week, all of her bands, including Tad, were dropped from the label. It was the second time in three years that Tad had been dropped by a major label.

The album sold poorly, having had very little promotion behind it.

== Critical reception ==
Professional ratings
Review scores
Source	Rating
AllMusic	2.5/5 stars
The Encyclopedia of Popular Music	3/5 stars

Trouser Press lamented "the sheer redundancy of skulk-fests like 'Bludge' and 'Thistle Suit'." The Philadelphia Inquirer wrote that "the band maintains a big, boisterous sound full of metal-flavored guitar riffs and snarling vocals, with enough rocking, melodic hooks to snag a place on the edges of the alternative mainstream."

== Track listing ==
1. "Ictus" - 3:17
2. "Bullhorn" - 3:17
3. "Thistle Suit" - 4:51
4. "Emotional Cockroach" - 3:46
5. "Red Eye Angel" - 2:17
6. "Bludge" - 2:35
7. "Dementia" - 3:27
8. "Weakling" - 3:28
9. "Halcyon Nights" - 3:19
10. "Particle Accelerator" - 3:25
11. "Tool Marks" - 2:59
12. "Mystery Copter" - 27:07 (there is about 10 minutes of blank recording from 7:17 to 17:17 in this track).
13. "Obsidian Lights" - 2:38 (Japan-only bonus track)

== Personnel ==
- Tad Doyle – vocals, guitar, keyboards
- Kurt Danielson – bass
- Josh Sinder – drums
- Jack Endino – producer, engineering, mixing
- John Agnello – mixing
- Eddy Schyreyer – mastering
