= Inhaler (album) =

Studio album by Tad
- Released: 1993
- Studio: Studio D (Sausalito, California)
- Genre: Grunge; alternative metal
- Length: 43:04
- Label: Giant/Warner Bros.
- Producer: J Mascis

Tad chronology
8-Way Santa (1991)	Inhaler (1993)	Infrared Riding Hood (1995)

Inhaler is the third studio album by American rock band Tad, released in 1993 by Giant Records and Warner Bros. Records. It was the band's major label debut after two albums and an EP released by Sub Pop, and it was also their first album with drummer Josh Sinder, formerly of the Accüsed. Tad toured with Soundgarden to promote Inhaler although the band failed to obtain worldwide success; however, the record is widely regarded as the band's strongest and obtained positive critical reception upon release.

The song "Grease Box" was played during the end credits of the 1994 movie Brainscan.

== Music and lyrics ==
Inhaler features a grunge and alternative metal sound with hooks and melodies. On the record's sound, Chicago Tribune's Greg Kot wrote: "Not only does it capture some of the wicked humor and pile-driving groove of the band's live show, it also finds Doyle singing more or less on key."

Some songs on the album feature disturbing lyrical themes such as serial killers and child abduction.

== Singles ==
Before being signed to Giant Records for this album, Tad had released "Lycanthrope" (with "Just Bought the Farm" as its B-side) as a single on Pusmort Records in 1992, even while still with Sub Pop. Both songs later appeared on Inhaler.

Tad only released one single from this album while with Giant: "Leafy Incline". Its B-side was "Pale Corkscrew", which does not appear on the album.

== Critical reception ==
Professional ratings
Review scores
Source	Rating
AllMusic	4/5 stars
Collector's Guide to Heavy Metal	7/10
Entertainment Weekly	B+

AllMusic senior critic Stephen Thomas Erlewine praised J Mascis' production work on the album, stating that the band "gets a more focused and driven sound". Erlewine also regarded the record as "easily their best and most consistent album to date". Entertainment Weekly's Tom Sinclair described the album as "alternative metal at its finest-bruising ham-handed, and catchy as hell", and compared it to a "a poppier Helmet".

The album was featured as number 13 on Spin's 2004 list of "The 20 Greatest Grunge Albums of All Time".

== Track listing ==
All songs written and arranged by Tad (Tad Doyle, Gary Thorstensen, Kurt Danielsen, Josh Sinder).

No.	Title	Length
1.	"Grease Box"	3:54
2.	"Throat Locust"	4:04
3.	"Just Bought the Farm"	4:15
4.	"Leafy Incline"	3:30
5.	"Lycanthrope"	3:34
6.	"Luminol"	4:42
7.	"Paregoric"	4:12
8.	"Rotor"	4:04
9.	"Ulcer"	4:37
10.	"Pansy"	2:48
11.	"Gouge"	3:20
Total length:		43:04

== Personnel ==
- Tad Doyle – vocals, guitar
- Kurt Danielson – bass
- Gary Thorstensen – guitar
- Josh Sinder – drums
- J Mascis – producer, piano (track 4)
- Larry Brewer – engineering
- John Agnello – mixing
- George Marino – mastering
