= Tad (band) =

American grunge band

- L-R: Producer Jack Endino with Tad Doyle, Kurt Danielson and Josh Sinder (1995)

Background information
- Origin: Seattle, Washington, U.S.
- Genres: Grunge; alternative metal; noise rock
- Years active: 1988–1999
- Labels: Sub Pop; Amphetamine Reptile; Futurist; Giant/Warner Bros.; East West/Elektra
- Past members: Tad Doyle; Kurt Danielson; Gary Thorstensen; Steve Wied; Rey Washam; Josh Sinder; Mike Mongrain

Tad (often styled as TAD) was an American rock band from Seattle, Washington, formed in 1988 by Tad Doyle. They are often recognized as one of the first grunge bands.

== History ==
=== Formation and Sub Pop years (1988–1991) ===
Tad was originally a solo project of Tad Doyle (born Thomas Andrew Doyle), former drummer of the band H-Hour, in early 1988 with Doyle singing and playing all instruments (guitar, bass, and drums), and recording a three-song demo. Tad was among the first bands signed to independent label Sub Pop Records. In 1988, Doyle released the "Daisy/Ritual Device" single on Sub Pop, produced by Jack Endino, for which Doyle wrote and performed all the music. Soon after, Doyle realized he needed a full band, and asked bassist Kurt Danielson to join him. Danielson's band, Bundle of Hiss, played with Doyle's previous band H-Hour. Doyle recruited drummer Steve Wied (formerly of Skin Yard) and guitarist Gary Thorstensen to complete the full lineup. Tad's debut album, God's Balls, was released in early 1989, also produced by Endino. The band toured Europe, with Nirvana as opening act, in late 1989.

In March 1990, the band released Salt Lick, recorded by Steve Albini. The vinyl was a six-track EP later expanded into a full-length with nine tracks once it was issued on CD. It contained the song "Wood Goblins", for which the band's first music video was produced. Tad recorded their third album, 8-Way Santa (1991), in Seattle, named after a type of blotter acid. Produced by Butch Vig, the album was more pop-oriented than its predecessors, and featured the singles "Jinx" and "Jack Pepsi".

"Jack Pepsi" was released as a single, but Pepsi filed a lawsuit against the band due to the cover art on the single, which was the Pepsi logo with "Tad" in place of "Pepsi". Another lawsuit was filed due to the cover of 8-Way Santa (which was a found photo of a man fondling a woman's breast). The couple in the photograph, one of whom had since become a born-again Christian and remarried, took exception and sued. Sub Pop subsequently changed the album cover to a shot of the band.

=== Major label years, turmoil, and breakup (1992–1999) ===
After appearing in the film Singles, Tad was offered its first major label deal by Warner Music Group's Giant Records. Around the same time, Wied left the band to join Willard and later Foil. Rey Washam (formerly of Scratch Acid) briefly filled in on drums in 1991, but was later replaced with Josh Sinder, previously of The Accüsed. Sinder debuted with Tad on their last Sub Pop release, the "Salem"/"Leper" single (which featured "Mud-Man", Sinder's apparently mumps-afflicted brother, on the cover). Their major label debut, Inhaler, appeared later in the year to positive reviews. The record failed to break the band, however, even though they were chosen to open for Soundgarden on their 1994 Superunknown tour. Giant Records dropped the band when a poster promoting Inhaler surfaced featuring Bill Clinton smoking a joint with the caption reading "It's heavy shit".

In 1995, the band released Live Alien Broadcasts on Futurist Records, a best-of live studio recording. Thorstensen left the band but Tad secured a second major label deal with East West/Elektra Records, another Warner label, in 1995. The same year, they released their final album, Infrared Riding Hood. With Thorstensen's absence, Doyle and producer Endino handled all of the guitar parts. Within a month of the release however, the band's A&R representative was fired and all of their signed bands were released, and production ceased on any albums, regardless of content. Tad continued to play for the remainder of the year before Sinder left to form the Hot Rod Lunatics. He was replaced on drums with Mike Mongrain of Foil. Tad's final single, "Oppenheimer's Pretty Nightmare"/"Accident on the Way to Church", appeared in 1998 on Up Records. A year later, the band dissolved.

=== Post-breakup (2000–2012) ===
Following Tad's breakup, Doyle formed Hog Molly in 2001 with Willard bassist Ty Garcia and 50 Paces guitarist Martin Chandler, releasing the album Kung-Fu Cocktail Grip late the same year. Willard guitarist Mark Spiders had recommended Garcia and Chandler. Hog Molly eventually broke up and its members other than Doyle formed a band called The Ones. Chandler joined The Supersuckers in 2009.

Doyle later formed the band Hoof. His other band, Brothers of the Sonic Cloth, had been playing in Seattle night clubs. Kurt Danielson formed Valis, a project that included members of Screaming Trees and Mudhoney. He also formed The Quaranteens, a post-punk/new wave band with Craig Paul, before moving to France. He was back in Seattle in 2008, and started to write a novel. Danielson also played in other local Seattle-based bands, including Misericords (with fellow ex-Tad member Mongrain on drums). Sinder played drums in The Insurgence and with Marky Felchtone from Zeke in the band Hellbound for Glory.

A documentary of the band titled Busted Circuits and Ringing Ears was released in February 2008. In July 2009, Doyle's website announced plans by Brothers of the Sonic Cloth to release a split 10" vinyl record with Seattle-area sludge metal band Mico de Noche. The Brothers of the Sonic Cloth/Mico de Noche split 10" vinyl record was released in October 2009 as an edition of 500 copies and featured two songs by Mico de Noche and one song by Brothers of the Sonic Cloth, "Fires Burn Dim in the Shadows of the Mountain". The record received several positive reviews and appeared on Seattle Weekly's list of that year's best local releases.

In 2009, Doyle performed with the members of Soundgarden and Tom Morello of Rage Against the Machine in Seattle. Chris Cornell, Soundgarden's original singer, was not present and Doyle took on vocals. This marked the first performance by Soundgarden in over a decade.

=== Partial reunion and aftermath (2013–present) ===
A semi-reunion of Tad took place at the Sub Pop Records 25th Anniversary Show on July 13, 2013 in Seattle, Washington. There, Doyle and Thorstensen joined Brothers of the Sonic Cloth to play a set of songs from God's Balls, Salt Lick, and 8-Way Santa.

Danielson went on to play with vocalist Ron Nine and guitarist Kevin Whitworth (Love Battery), vocalist Katie Scarberry, and drummer Garret Shavlik (former member of The Fluid) for a self-produced album, Vaporland, in 2014. He and Ron Nine then played in Purple Strange with Jared Stroud, Matthew Candenberghe, and Endino, and issued another self-produced album of the same name in 2021.

A vinyl-only archival album, Quick and Dirty, was released in April 2018 as part of Record Store Day, which contained unreleased tracks Tad recorded between 1995 and 1999 (in addition to a handful of live songs).

== Influences and legacy ==
Tad cited influences including Black Sabbath, Captain Beefheart, Butthole Surfers, Head of David, the Birthday Party, Black Flag, U-Men, Aerosmith, Neurosis, Yob, Rush, Pink Floyd and Frank Zappa.

In 2017, Metal Injection ranked Tad at number 5 on their list of the "10 Heaviest Grunge Bands".

== Band members ==
- Tad Doyle – vocals, guitar (1988–1999), bass, drums (1988)
- Kurt Danielson – bass (1988–1999)
- Gary Thorstensen – guitar (1988–1994)
- Steve Wied – drums (1988–1991)
- Rey Washam – drums (1991)
- Josh Sinder – drums (1992–1996)
- Mike Mongrain – drums (1996–1999)

Timeline

== Discography ==
=== Studio albums ===
- God's Balls (1989) Sub Pop
- Salt Lick (1990) Sub Pop
- 8-Way Santa (1991) Sub Pop
- Inhaler (1993) Giant/Warner Bros. Records
- Infrared Riding Hood (1995) East West/Elektra Records

=== Live albums ===
- Live Alien Broadcasts (1995) Futurist Records

=== Compilation albums ===
- Salt Lick/God's Balls (1990) Sub Pop
- Quick and Dirty (2018) Incineration Ceremony Recordings

=== Extended plays and singles ===
- Daisy/Ritual Device (1988) Sub Pop
- Damaged I (1989) Sub Pop Records (split w/ Pussy Galore)
- Wood Goblins/Cooking With Gas (1989) Glitterhouse Records
- Loser/Cooking with Gas (1990) Sub Pop
- Jinx/Pig Iron (1990) Sub Pop
- Jack Pepsi/Eddie Hook (1991) Sub Pop
- Salem/Welt/Leper (1992) Sub Pop
- Lycantrope/Just Bought the Farm (1992) Pusmort Records
- Leafy Incline/Pale Corkscrew (1993) Giant/Warner Bros. Records
- Dementia (1995) East West/Elektra Records
- Red Eye Angel/Bludge (1995) East West/Elektra Records
- Obscene Hand/Kevorkian's Holiday (1997) Amphetamine Reptile Records
- Oppenheimer's Pretty Nightmare/Accident On the Way to Church (1998) Up Records

=== Compilation and soundtrack appearances ===
- Sub Pop 200 (1988) Sub Pop – "Sex God Missy"
- Sub Pop Rock City (1989) Glitterhouse Records – "Sex God Missy"
- Crunchhouse (1989) Glitterhouse Records – "Behemoth"
- Dope, Guns 'N Fucking in the Streets, Vol. 1–3 (1989) Amphetamine Reptile Records – "Habit & Necessity"
- Fuck Me I'm Rich (1990) Sub Pop – "Ritual Device" and "Daisy"
- The Grunge Years (1991) Sub Pop – "Stumblin' Man"
- Revolution Come 'N' Gone (1992) Sub Pop – "Jinx"
- Mesomorph Enduros (1992) Big Cat Records – "Pig Iron"
- 1989-1993: The John Peel Sub Pop Sessions (1993) Sub Pop – "Helot"
- Brainscan Original Motion Picture Soundtrack (1994) Ruffhouse Records – "Grease Box"
- Insanity (1994) Sony Music Entertainment – "Luminol"
- Bite Back: Live at the Crocodile Cafe (1996) PopLlama Records – "Just Bought the Farm" (live)
- Hype! The Motion Picture Soundtrack (1996) Sub Pop – "Giant Killer"
- Up Next: The Up Records Compilation (1998) Up Records – "Oppenheimer's Pretty Nightmare"

== See also ==
- Bundle of Hiss
- Hog Molly
