= Coffin Break =

American hardcore punk band

- Origin: Seattle, Washington, U.S.
- Genres: Grunge, hardcore punk
- Years active: 1987–1994, 2007-Present
- Labels: C/Z, Epitaph
- Members: Rob Skinner; Pete Litwin; David Brooks; Todd Ohashi
- Past members: Jeff Lorien (1992-1994); Brad Jones (1987); Steve Corliss (1987)
- Website: coffinbreak.com

Coffin Break are a hardcore punk band from Seattle, Washington.

== History ==
Coffin Break was formed in Seattle in the late-1980s, at the start of the grunge era. The group released its first two full-length albums and a compilation on C/Z Records. Signing to Epitaph Records, they released two further albums in 1991 and 1992 before disbanding in late 1993. Both bassist Rob Skinner and guitarist Peter Litwin wrote songs for the group, and the group's releases show a marked difference between their songwriting styles. Kurt Cobain mentioned the group as one of his favorite bands. The band appeared in the 1996 documentary Hype!, directed by Doug Pray, with a short clip of a live version of their song Kill The President. Coffin Break reunited in 2007, added guitarist Todd Ohashi in 2019; and are currently playing regional shows and have completed work on a full-length album for vinyl and digital release.

== Discography ==
- Noise Patch b/w Boxes 'N Boxes/ Obsession Live EP (C/Z Records, 1988)
- Psychosis (C/Z Records, 1989)
- Rupture (C/Z Records, 1990)
- No Sleep 'Til The Stardust Motel (compilation) (C/Z Records, 1991)
- Crawl (Epitaph Records, 1991)
- Thirteen (Epitaph Records, 1992)
- Revival (Broken Vinyl Records, 2025)

=== Compilations ===
- Another Damned Seattle Compilation (Dashboard Hula Girl Records, 1991)-"Love Song"
- Teriyaki Asthma Vols. I-V (C/Z Records, 1991)-"Hole in the Ground"
- Hard to Believe: Kiss Covers Compilation (C/Z Records, 1990)—"Beth"
- More Songs About Anger, Fear, Sex & Death (Epitaph Records, 1992)—"For Beth" and "Crawl"
- Tribute to Black Sabbath: Eternal Masters (various artists) (1994) - "Hole In The Sky"

== Members ==
- David Brooks - drums
- Peter Litwin - guitar, vocals
- Rob Skinner - bass, vocals
- Todd Ohashi - guitar
