= 8-Way Santa =

Studio album by Tad
- Released: February 15, 1991
- Recorded: 1990 at Smart Studios, Madison, Wisconsin
- Genre: Grunge
- Length: 39:15
- Label: Sub Pop
- Producer: Butch Vig

Tad chronology
Salt Lick/God's Balls (1990)	8-Way Santa (1991)	Inhaler (1993)

Cover of second pressing

Professional ratings
Review scores
Source	Rating
AllMusic	4/5 stars
Entertainment Weekly	A−

8-Way Santa is the second album by the Seattle grunge band Tad. It was released on February 15, 1991, through Sub Pop.

Tad ran into legal trouble after the man and woman featured on the album cover saw the record and sued the band. The cover was an altered photo, the original of which was found in a photo album purchased from a thrift store.

Rolling Stone ranked this album 31st on their list of the 50 Greatest Grunge Albums.

== Singles ==
"Jinx" and "Jack Pepsi" were the singles released from this album. Pepsi filed a lawsuit against the band for using their logo on the single "Jack Pepsi". The song itself was, in the words of music journalist Roy Wilkinson, "the true story of how Tad and his mate tanked up on Jack Daniels and cola before taking a pick-up onto an ice-covered lake — tempting fate ... and sure enough, they crashed through".

"Jinx" was featured in the Cameron Crowe film Singles (1992), although it is not included in the official soundtrack album.

== Track listing ==
No.	Title	Length
1.	"Jinx"	3:03
2.	"Giant Killer"	3:03
3.	"Wired God"	3:03
4.	"Delinquent"	2:57
5.	"Hedge Hog"	0:39
6.	"Flame Tavern"	3:19
7.	"Trash Truck"	3:25
8.	"Stumblin' Man"	3:35
9.	"Jack Pepsi"	3:10
10.	"Candi"	4:29
11.	"3-D Witch Hunt"	3:34
12.	"Crane's Cafe"	2:47
13.	"Plague Years"	2:30

== Personnel ==
- Tad Doyle – vocals, guitar
- Kurt Danielson – bass
- Gary Thorstensen – guitar
- Steve Wied – drums

Production

- Butch Vig – producer, engineering
- Doug Olson – engineering
- John Agnello – mixing
- George Marino – mastering
