= God's Balls =

Studio album by Tad
- Released: March 1, 1989
- Studio: Reciprocal (Seattle)
- Genres: Alternative metal; grunge
- Length: 37:34
- Label: Sub Pop
- Producer: Jack Endino

Tad chronology
| God's Balls (1989) | Salt Lick (1990) |

God's Balls is the debut studio album by the American rock band Tad, released in 1989 by Sub Pop. The band promoted the album by undertaking a European tour with labelmates Nirvana. The album was re-released as a deluxe edition in 2016 by Sub Pop.

== Production ==
The album was produced by Jack Endino. The band's goal was to create an album lacking harmony and melody.

== Critical reception ==
Professional ratings
Review scores
| Source | Rating |
|---|---|
| AllMusic | 4/5 stars |
| The Encyclopedia of Popular Music | 3/5 stars |
| Record Collector | 4/5 stars |
| Sounds | 4/5 stars |

Trouser Press called the album "impressively punishing," writing that "the riff-heavy 'Behemoth', 'Satan’s Chainsaw' and especially the Ed Gein-inspired 'Nipple Belt' hit like a succession of knees to the groin, with Doyle’s rugged, sneering vocals adding insult to injury." PopMatters wrote: "Relying on legendary Seattle producer Jack Endino to help translate their monolithic live sound to record, the band set about doing what they do best -- namely channeling ‘70s heavy metal into something even heavier and more oppressive than any of their forebears could’ve imagined."

== Track listing ==
| No. | Title | Length |
|---|---|---|
| 1. | "Behemoth" | 4:10 |
| 2. | "Pork Chop" | 4:22 |
| 3. | "Helot" | 2:58 |
| 4. | "Tuna Car" | 2:37 |
| 5. | "Sex God Missy" (Lumberjack mix) | 4:29 |
| 6. | "Cyanide Bath" | 3:37 |
| 7. | "Boiler Room" | 4:49 |
| 8. | "Satan's Chainsaw" | 3:10 |
| 9. | "Hollow Man" | 4:05 |
| 10. | "Nipple Belt" | 3:17 |
| Total length: | | 37:34 |

== Personnel ==
Tad

- Tad Doyle – vocals, guitar
- Gary Thorstensen – guitar
- Kurt Danielson – bass
- Steve Wied – drums

Production

- Jack Endino – production, engineering, mastering
- Charles Peterson – photography

== Charts ==
| Chart (1989) | Peak position |
|---|---|
| UK Independent Albums (OCC) | 16 |
