= Hype! (soundtrack) =

Hype! The Motion Picture Soundtrack

Soundtrack album by Sub Pop Records
- Released: October 1, 1996
- Recorded: 1979–1996
- Genre: Grunge; Punk rock
- Length: 61:31
- Label: Sub Pop
- Producer: Jack Endino

Sub Pop Records chronology
Never Mind the Molluscs (1993)	Hype! The Motion Picture Soundtrack (1996)	Give the People What We Want: Songs of The Kinks (2001)

Professional ratings
Review scores
Source	Rating
AllMusic	4/5 stars

Hype! The Motion Picture Soundtrack is the soundtrack album of the Seattle music scene documentary Hype!. It was released in 1996 in conjunction with the film.

== Initial release ==
The soundtrack was released on CD on October 1, 1996.

=== Track list ===
No.	Title	Artist	Length
1.	"K Street" (live)	Fastbacks	2:59
2.	"Return of the Rat"	Wipers	2:37
3.	"Dig It a Hole"	U-Men	2:17
4.	"Swallow My Pride" (Demo)	Green River	2:44
5.	"Nothing to Say"	Soundgarden	3:56
6.	"Touch Me I'm Sick" (live)	Mudhoney	2:18
7.	"Negative Creep"	Nirvana	2:53
8.	"Mousetrap" (live)	Some Velvet Sidewalk	2:05
9.	"54/40" (live)	Dead Moon	4:03
10.	"My Hometown"	Girl Trouble	3:32
11.	"Giant Killer"	Tad	3:02
12.	"Hotcakes" (7" version)	Gas Huffer	2:31
13.	"Low Beat"	The Young Fresh Fellows	2:30
14.	"I Say Fuck" (live)	Supersuckers	0:46
15.	"Knot" (live)	7 Year Bitch	3:42
16.	"Second Skin" (live)	The Gits	3:07
17.	"Julie Francavilla" (Demo)	Flop	2:04
18.	"Throwaway" (live)	The Posies	3:34
19.	"Not for You" (live on Monkeywrench Radio)	Pearl Jam	5:12
20.	"The River Rise"	Mark Lanegan	3:56
21.	"Fire's Coming Down"	Pigeonhed	4:23
22.	"Just Say"	Fastbacks	2:32
23.	"Smells Like Teen Spirit" (Instrumental)	Sara DeBell	1:51
Total length:			61:31

== Vinyl box set release ==
An additional box set was released on November 5, 1996. 2000 copies were made. The set consists of four color vinyl 7" records in die-cut sleeves, and packaged with a fold-out poster.

Eight of the tracks on the box set are identical to the tracks on the CD. One ("Hotcakes") is a live version of the same song (studio version) on the CD. "Dark Corner of the World" and the live version of "Watch Outside" were not released officially anywhere else.

=== Track list ===
Side A
No.	Title	Artist	Length
1.	"Dig It a Hole"	The U-Men	2:17

Side B
No.	Title	Artist	Length
1.	"Nothing to Say"	Soundgarden	3:56

Side C
No.	Title	Artist	Length
1.	"Return of the Rat"	The Wipers	2:37

Side D
No.	Title	Artist	Length
1.	"Touch Me I'm Sick" (live)	Mudhoney	2:18
2.	"Negative Creep"	Nirvana	2:53

Side E
No.	Title	Artist	Length
1.	"Hotcakes" (live)	Gas Huffer	2:38
2.	"Watch Outside" (live)	Mono Men	2:21

Side F
No.	Title	Artist	Length
1.	"My Hometown"	Girl Trouble	3:32

Side G
No.	Title	Artist	Length
1.	"K Street" (live)	Fastbacks	2:59
2.	"Julie Francavilla" (demo)	Flop	2:04

Side H
No.	Title	Artist	Length
1.	"Dark Corner Of The World"	The Young Fresh Fellows	3:38
