= Sick 'Em =

Studio album by 7 Year Bitch
- Released: October 1992
- Recorded: June 1990 – June 1992
- Genres: Punk rock; riot grrrl
- Length: 33:35
- Label: C/Z
- Producer: Scott Benson

7 Year Bitch chronology
| Sick 'Em (1992) | ¡Viva Zapata! (1994) |

Professional ratings
Review scores
| Source | Rating |
|---|---|
| AllMusic | 3/5 stars |
| The Encyclopedia of Popular Music | 3/5 stars |
| Kerrang! | 4/5 stars |
| Rolling Stone | 3.5/5 stars |
| Select | 3/5 stars |
| Vox | 7/10 |

Sick 'Em is the debut studio album by Seattle punk rock band 7 Year Bitch. It was released in October 1992 on the local C/Z Records label and collected all of the band's previous releases up to that point. The album was originally slated for an earlier release date but was delayed following the death of guitarist Stefanie Sargent in June 1992.

== Critical reception ==
Trouser Press called the album "a fairly primitive and monochromatic burst of punk rage."

== Track listing ==
All songs by Selene Vigil and Elizabeth Davis, except where noted.

1. Chow Down - 3:03
2. Tired of Nothing - 2:14
3. Knot - 5:08
4. In Lust You Trust (Vigil/Stefanie Sargent/Davis) - 3:25
5. Sink (Vigil/Sargent) - 3:19
6. Gun (Davis/Sargent) - 2:16
7. Lorna - 1:56
8. You Smell Lonely - 2:03
9. No Fucking War (Vigil/Sargent/Davis/Valerie Agnew) - 1:53
10. Dead Men Don't Rape (Vigil/Agnew/Davis) - 2:47
11. 8-Ball Deluxe - 2:52
12. Can We Laugh Now? (Thatcher on Acid) - 2:32
- Tracks #1–6 are from 1992 10-inch EP Chow Down
- Tracks #7–9 are from 1991 7-inch single Lorna / No Fuckin' War / You Smell Lonely
- Tracks #10–11 are from 1992 7-inch EP Antidisestablishmentarianism
- Track #12 is from 1992 split 7-inch No Fuckin' War / Can We Laugh Now with Thatcher On Acid

== Personnel ==
- Selene Vigil — vocals
- Stefanie Sargent — guitar
- Elizabeth Davis — bass
- Valerie Agnew — drums
