= Outpunk =

American queer punk record label

Outpunk enjoys the distinction of being the first record label entirely devoted to queer punk bands.

The label was run out of San Francisco and began as an extension of Matt Wobensmith's fanzine, Outpunk. Outpunk ran for seven issues, from 1992 till 1997, with contributions from queer punks such as Anonymous Boy, interviews with queercore bands and a split issue with Gary Fembot. He released two records in 1992, the 7" single compilations There's A Faggot In The Pit and There's A Dyke In The Pit. At this time there were few actual queercore bands in existence, so some of the artists that appeared were politically motivated punk bands that supported the queercore movement. There's A Dyke In The Pit features Bikini Kill, Lucy Stoners, 7 Year Bitch and the first song released by Tribe 8, stalwarts of the queercore scene. Outpunk's next compilation was the Outpunk Dance Party compilation LP/CD, which introduced many new queer bands to the public. Among them was Randy 'Biscuit' Turner of Big Boys new band Swine King, Pansy Division, Sister George, Sta-Prest and Mukilteo Fairies.

After this, Outpunk began to release many singles and LPs by queercore artists from the US, Canada and UK. Wobensmith was also writing a column for Maximum RocknRoll zine, which extended the range of people being introduced to queer punk music while addressing issues such as homophobia in the punk community.

In DIY: The Rise Of Lo-Fi Culture, Amy Spencer writes, "Matt Wobensmith...feels that a person's self-identification as gay shouldn't form the basis of their whole personality. 'Gay people often sacrifice the cultures they come from just to belong to something.' This sacrifice of a radical culture, whether as an artist, punk or anarchist, is what the queercore movement has always battled against."

Wobensmith ended the label in the late 90s, and began a new label called Queercorps, which was short-lived. He spoke about the reasons behind this in an interview included in the book We Owe You Nothing: Punk Planet, The Collected Interviews, edited by Daniel Sinker, originally appearing in Punk Planet zine. Subsequently he ran the label A.C.R.O.N.Y.M., which specialized in gay hip hop music acts. Outpunk records and CDs are much sought after by collectors, since most were produced in limited runs and are rare and hard to find.

As of 2009, he runs the vintage zine store Goteblüd in San Francisco.

== Artists ==
- 7 Year Bitch
- Behead the Prophet, No Lord Shall Live
- Bikini Kill
- CWA
- Cypher in the Snow
- Fifth Column
- God Is My Co-Pilot
- Lucy Stoners
- Mukilteo Fairies
- The Need
- Pansy Division
- Sister George
- Sta-Prest
- Swine King
- Team Dresch
- Tribe 8
- The Hyperdrive Kittens

== See also ==
- List of record labels
