= Mad Love (1995 film) =

- Theatrical release poster
- Directed by: Antonia Bird
- Written by: Paula Milne
- Produced by: Steve Golin; David Manson
- Starring: Chris O'Donnell; Drew Barrymore; Joan Allen
- Cinematography: Fred Tammes
- Edited by: Jeff Freeman
- Music by: Andy Roberts
- Production company: Touchstone Pictures
- Distributed by: Buena Vista Pictures Distribution
- Release date: May 26, 1995
- Running time: 96 minutes
- Country: United States
- Language: English
- Box office: $15,453,274

Mad Love is a 1995 American teen romantic drama film directed by Antonia Bird and starring Drew Barrymore and Chris O'Donnell. It was written by Paula Milne. The original music score is composed by Andy Roberts.

== Plot ==
In Seattle, Matt Leland is a straight-laced high school senior who lives with his workaholic father and 9-year-old twin siblings. Matt, whose mom had long ago left the family, has assumed the role of a parent for his young brother and sister. He becomes intrigued by a girl who lives across the lake from him, and spies on her through his telescope as she jet skis at night. He learns that the girl, Casey Roberts, is a new student at his high school and has just moved from Chicago. Matt asks her out and they go to a concert together. When Casey finds out Matt was using a telescope to spy on her, she angrily blows him off at first, but relents after he apologizes and the two polar opposites begin a whirlwind romance.

Matt is drawn to Casey's free-spirited, fun-loving nature, and she confides to him she has a volatile personality where she goes from intense feelings of passion to fear and destructiveness. In one instance, Casey tries to get Matt's attention while he is taking the SATs by deliberately setting off the fire alarm at school, resulting in her suspension. Her suspension angers her parents, particularly her domineering father, and plans are made to send her away to a boarding school. That night, Casey overdoses on sleeping pills, and she is involuntarily committed to a psychiatric ward as a result.

Matt visits Casey in the hospital despite the objections of his father, who scolds Matt for neglecting his studies and his younger siblings. The second time Matt visits Casey, the two manage to sneak out when the orderlies are preoccupied with other patients. The pair head to Mexico in Matt's SUV, but along the way, they wreck the car when Casey decides to play a "trust game" with Matt by covering his eyes and giving him directions while he drives. They accept a ride from a salesman, but when the salesman makes an advance on Casey, she defends herself by putting out her lit cigarette on his face. The salesman throws her out of the car and a fight ensues between him and Matt. Matt and Casey are able to steal the car and drive off, leaving the salesman behind.

As the couple get closer to Mexico, Casey's behavior grows increasingly erratic and anxious, but Matt tries to help her and selflessly puts her needs before his. He gradually realizes her mental health is beyond his assistance. After Casey has multiple emotional breakdowns, Matt reluctantly makes a phone call to her concerned parents. Mrs. Roberts tells Matt that her daughter is manic depressive and needs her medication for her mood swings. She pleads for him to bring Casey home so her illness can be treated, but Matt refuses, fearing she will be locked up in a hospital again. Casey overhears him talking to her parents and misinterprets his call as a betrayal.

Casey steals the keys to the car and drives off, with Matt stealing a truck to chase after her. He finds her alone in a desert where she threatens suicide and vows to shoot Matt with a gun she took from the glove compartment in the salesman's car. Exasperated, Matt tells her to go ahead and shoot him, but Casey can't bring herself to do it and breaks down. He runs to hug Casey and the couple return to Seattle, where Casey is readmitted to the psychiatric hospital. Matt returns home, but misses being with Casey. Some time later, Matt receives a letter from Casey saying she has moved back to Chicago and now feels significantly better. In her letter she writes, "I had a dream last night, you were in it. You waved to me, maybe to say goodbye, it doesn't matter. Whatever happens, I'm proud of what we went through. It helps me get through the day. That, and you in my heart," implying a future for their relationship.

== Main cast ==
- Chris O'Donnell as Matt Leland
- Drew Barrymore as Casey Roberts
- Matthew Lillard as Eric
- Joan Allen as Margaret Roberts
- Jude Ciccolella as Richard Roberts
- Amy Sakasitz as Joanna Leland
- T.J. Lowther as Adam Leland
- Kevin Dunn as Clifford Leland
- Elaine Miles as Housekeeper
- Liev Schreiber as Salesman

== Production ==
Producer David Manson said, "For a long time, I had an idea to do a movie about a boy who falls in love with a girl with some complicated emotional problems. It came out of certain experiences I had as an adolescent…about a young man coming to live with a sense of loss and determining how to go forward in his life."

The film was shot from June to August of 1994 on location in the Seattle area and New Mexico.

In the audio commentary for the Blu-ray release of the film, journalist Bryan Reesman stated that because of controversy surrounding Antonia Bird’s 1994 film Priest, which was released while Mad Love was in production, major studio cuts were made to Paula Milne's script and Bird's final cut before it was released to theaters. Among these changes was the removal of darker subject matter about mental illness and teen suicide, as well as the reduction of Casey's behavior to mere depression, when her symptoms indicate she has bipolar disorder.

In a 1999 interview with The A.V. Club, Antonia Bird said of the film, "the main thing I learned...was how the Hollywood studio system works. I went into Mad Love as a European naïve. I had no idea. We do things a very different way in Britain. I came into the big Hollywood system—nobody warned me what it was going to be like—and I kind of blundered my way through it. I had a great time working with Drew [Barrymore] and Chris [O'Donnell], but it was quite difficult, because I really didn't know what was happening...For a director, 80 percent of the movie has nothing to do with directing; it's all politics and post-production."

== Reception ==
On Rotten Tomatoes, the film has an approval rating of 31% based on 26 reviews.

Though the story was criticized as a familiar one, with some outlets calling the film a "B-movie road adventure", both Barrymore and O'Donnell's performances were highly praised by critics. Roger Ebert wrote, "it's not the first movie about two troubled kids who hit the road in an attempt to run away to their dreams. But it's the first one in a while that turns realistic, and shows one of the kids trying to react responsibly when the situation gets out of hand. That makes it more interesting, because it's about real problems, not movie problems." Of Barrymore, Ebert wrote, "she has a couple of scenes that could have gone badly wrong - a blowup in a restaurant and a confrontation with Matt - and she plays them just right, not too dramatically or strangely, but with the right balance of bravado and fear."

Emanuel Levy of Variety labeled the film as "yet another variation on amour fou and love on the run", but stated "the sensual acting of charismatic leads Chris O'Donnell and Drew Barrymore is beyond reproach." Multiple critics also commended the film for a realistic depiction of mental illness. Lisa Schwarzbaum of Entertainment Weekly wrote director Antonia Bird "captures some tender moments of real despair" and gave the film a grade of B.

Kevin Thomas of the Los Angeles Times gave a mixed review, criticizing the film for succumbing to movie-of-the-week territory, and not going deeper into "the root cause of Casey’s instability, [or] just what role her authoritarian father may or may not have in her condition." Thomas concluded the film "does show to great advantage O’Donnell, who underplays in impressively sustained fashion, and especially Barrymore, who radiates a timeless, indelible star quality".

== Soundtrack ==
Mad Love

Soundtrack album by Various Artists
- Released: 1995
- Genres: Indie rock, alternative rock
- Length: 42:28
- Label: Sony Legacy

The soundtrack for Mad Love consists of ten tracks from the indie rock and alternative music genres.

No.	Title	Length
1.	"Slowly, Slowly" (Magnapop)	3:35
2.	"The Scratch" (7 Year Bitch)	1:59
3.	"Here Comes My Girl" (Throneberry)	5:25
4.	"Mockingbirds" (Grant Lee Buffalo)	4:42
5.	"Glazed" (Rocket from the Crypt)	8:20
6.	"Fallout" (Fluorescein)	3:13
7.	"Mona Lisa Overdrive" (Head Candy)	3:16
8.	"Ultra Anxiety (Teenage Style)" (Madder Rose)	3:21
9.	"Icy Blue" (7 Year Bitch)	3:58
10.	"As Long as You Hold Me" (Kirsty MacColl)	4:39
Total length:		42:28

Other songs that were featured in the film but are not on the soundtrack include:

- "Love Buzz" – Nirvana
- "Citysong" – Luscious Jackson
- "Let's Go for a Ride" – Cracker
- "Stutter" – Elastica
- "Shakin' Shakin' Shakes" – Los Lobos
- "Let Freedom Ring (Volumes 4, 5 e 6)" – Mark Germino
- "Come To My Window" - Melissa Ethridge

== Home media ==
Mad Love was released as a special edition Blu-ray by Kino Lorber on December 17, 2019.

== See also ==
- Crazy/Beautiful
