= Kill Rock Stars (album) =

Compilation album by Various Artists
- Released: 1991
- Genre: Punk rock
- Label: Kill Rock Stars

Various Artists chronology
Kill Rock Stars (1991)	Stars Kill Rock (1993)

Professional ratings
Review scores
Source	Rating
Allmusic	4.5/5 stars

Kill Rock Stars is an album released in August 1991 by various artists on the Kill Rock Stars label. Most of the bands on this record performed at the 1991 International Pop Underground Convention or are from Olympia. The album was re-issued on vinyl in limited quantities as a Record Store Day exclusive in 2011.

== Track listing (LP) ==
No.	Title	Writer(s)	Length
1.	"Girl Germs" (Bratmobile)		1:45
2.	"Loch Ness" (Some Velvet Sidewalk)		2:17
3.	"Don't Mix the Colors" (Courtney Love)	Beat Happening	1:48
4.	"N.O.U. Cooking with Gas!" (The Nation of Ulysses)		3:57
5.	"You Speak Jealousy" (Unwound)		3:13
6.	"Narrow" (Mecca Normal)		3:08
7.	"Beeswax" (Nirvana)	Kurt Cobain	2:47
8.	"Feels Blind" (Bikini Kill)		3:36
9.	"Reaper Song" (Witchy Poo)		1:41
10.	"Ever Since My Accident" (Melvins)	Buzz Osborne	0:50
11.	"Immediate Impound Zone" (Infamous Menagerie)	E Schneider, L Puteska	5:54
12.	"Make You Come" (Kicking Giant)		1:11
13.	"Everybody and their Dog" (Fitz of Depression)		1:32
14.	"Red Dress" (Jad Fair)		2:52

== Track listing (CD) ==
No.	Title	Writer(s)	Length
1.	"Girl Germs" (Bratmobile)		1:45
2.	"Loch Ness" (Some Velvet Sidewalk)		2:17
3.	"Don't Mix the Colors" (Courtney Love)	Beat Happening	1:48
4.	"N.O.U. Cooking with Gas!" (The Nation of Ulysses)		3:57
5.	"You Speak Jealousy" (Unwound)		3:13
6.	"Narrow" (Mecca Normal)		3:08
7.	"Beeswax" (Nirvana)	Kurt Cobain	2:47
8.	"My Red Self" (Heavens to Betsy)		3:48
9.	"Strong, Warm, and in Command" (Steve Fisk)	Steve Fisk	5:01
10.	"Feels Blind" (Bikini Kill)		3:36
11.	"Reaper Song" (Witchy Poo)		1:41
12.	"Ever Since My Accident" (Melvins)	Buzz Osborne	0:50
13.	"Immediate Impound Zone" (Infamous Menagerie)	E Schneider, L Puteska	5:54
14.	"Make You Come" (Kicking Giant)		1:11
15.	"Everybody and their Dog" (Fitz of Depression)		1:32
16.	"Red Dress" (Jad Fair)		2:52
17.	"8-Ball Deluxe" (7 Year Bitch)		2:45
18.	"I.O.U." (Kreviss)		2:22
19.	"Don't Look at Me (Uncredited Bonus Track)" (Unknown Artist)		3:29
