= C/Z Records =

Seattle record label

- Founded: 1985
- Founder: Chris Hanzsek; Tina Casale
- Defunct: 2001
- Genre: Punk rock, alternative rock, grunge
- Country of origin: United States
- Location: Seattle, Washington; Los Angeles, California
- Official website: czrecords.com

C/Z Records was a Seattle-based punk rock record label established in early 1985 by Chris Hanzsek and Tina Casale. It started with the release of Deep Six, which collected early recordings of what later came to be known as grunge. After Deep Six proved commercially unsuccessful, Hanzsek and Casale sold the label to Daniel House.

== History ==
The label was first founded in early 1985 by Chris Hanzsek and Tina Casale. The label's first release in March 1986 was Deep Six (CZ001), a compilation LP featuring early grunge bands Soundgarden, Melvins, Green River, Skin Yard, Malfunkshun, and The U-Men. The record was commercially unsuccessful, and after around 18 months, Hanzsek and Casale decided to sell the label.

Daniel House, bass player for Skin Yard, who was recording the band's first album at the time, took over the operation of C/Z records. Over the following years, C/Z Records became an outlet for many unsigned Seattle bands. In 1989, House began working as director of sales for newly-formed Seattle independent record label Sub Pop. Eventually he left C/Z Records, and subsequently released early albums and singles by The Presidents of the United States of America, Melvins, Built to Spill, 7 Year Bitch, The Gits, Silkworm and Hammerbox.

In 1993, C/Z entered into a production and distribution deal with Sony-owned RED Distribution. The deal had a negative impact on the label,, which was forced to downsize, and did not issue any new releases for over a year.

In 1996, BMG-owned Zoo Entertainment partnered with C/Z, providing an operating and recording budget and assisting in the development of new artists. In 1997, Zoo was purchased by Volcano Entertainment and all third party ventures were dropped.

Daniel House subsequently returned C/Z to part-time status, releasing only occasional records on an infrequent basis.

== Releases ==
In 2002, C/Z released a collection of unreleased and unavailable Skin Yard material, Start at the Top.

C/Z released several Teriyaki Asthma compilations, one of which contained Nirvana's track "Mexican Seafood". Nirvana also released their version of "Do You Love Me?" on C/Z's Kiss tribute album Hard to Believe: Kiss Covers Compilation.

== Notable bands ==
Notable bands who released music through C/Z Records included:

- 10 Minute Warning
- 7 Year Bitch
- Alcohol Funnycar
- Built To Spill
- Caustic Resin
- Coffin Break
- Hammerbox
- Huevos Rancheros
- Hullabaloo
- Love Battery
- Melvins
- Monks of Doom
- Moonshake
- Pain Teens
- Presidents Of The USA
- Rhythm Pigs
- Rollins / Hard-Ons
- Silkworm
- Skin Yard
- The Gits
- The Lemons
- The Semibeings
- Tone Dogs
- Treepeople
- Wreck
