= Jack Endino discography =

Jack Endino is an influential audio engineer and musician particularly associated with Seattle label Sub Pop and the grunge movement.

This list contains albums and EPs Endino has recorded, mixed, and/or produced, and is incomplete.

== 1986-1987 ==
- 1986: Skin Yard – Skin Yard
- 1986: Dry as a Bone – Green River
- 1987: Screaming Life - Soundgarden

== 1988 ==
- 1988: Secretions - Various Artists
- 1988: Superfuzz Bigmuff EP – Mudhoney
- 1988: Primal Rock Therapy EP – Blood Circus
- 1988: Sub Pop 200 - Various Artists
- 1988: Hallowed Ground - Skin Yard

== 1989 ==
- 1989: God's Balls - TAD
- 1989: Roadmouth - Fluid
- 1989: Buzz Factory - Screaming Trees
- 1989: Bleach - Nirvana
- 1989: Psychosis - Coffin Break
- 1989: Journey to the Center of Cat Butt - Cat Butt
- 1989: Mudhoney - Mudhoney
- 1989: The Last Laugh - Helios Creed

== 1990 ==
- 1990: The Thrown Ups - The Thrown Ups
- 1990: Angle of Attack - Jack Endino
- 1990: Fist Sized Chunks - Skin Yard
- 1990: Up in It - Afghan Whigs
- 1990: Fuck Me I'm Rich - Various Artists
- 1990: Solomon Grundy - Solomon Grundy
- 1990: Spanking Machine - Babes in Toyland
- 1990: The Winding Sheet - Mark Lanegan
- 1990: Blood Guts & Pussy - Dwarves
- 1990: Rupture - Coffin Break
- 1990: Highlights and Lowlives - Blue Cheer
- 1990: Time Whore - Treepeople
- 1990: Hymns for the Deranged - The Accüsed
- 1990: Grinning Like an Undertaker - The Accüsed
- 1990: Between the Eyes - Love Battery
- 1990: Smell The Magic - L7
- 1990: Inside Yours - Gruntruck

== 1991 ==
- 1991: 1000 Smiling Knuckles - Skin Yard
- 1991: Despised - Seaweed
- 1991: Straight Razor - The Accüsed
- 1991: Janitors of Tomorrow - Gas Huffer
- 1991: Teriyaki Asthma Vol. 1-5 - Various Artists
- 1991: No Sleep Till the Stardust Motel - Coffin Break
- 1991: Crawl - Coffin Break
- 1991: The Grunge Years - Various Artists
- 1991: Guilt, Regret, Embarrassment Various 7 inches on Toxic Shock release - Treepeople

== 1992 ==
- 1992: Weak - Seaweed
- 1992: Doom Picnic - Alien Boys
- 1992: Push - Gruntruck
- 1992: Thirteen - Coffin Break
- 1992: The Smoke of Hell - Supersuckers
- 1992: Mariposa - Rein Sanction
- 1992: Steel Mill - Willard
- 1992: Incesticide - Nirvana
- 1992: Integrity, Technology & Service - Gas Huffer
- 1992: Endino's Earthworm - Jack Endino

== 1993 ==
- 1993: Brother Fear - Bucket
- 1993: Circus of Values - Loveslug
- 1993: Titanomaquia - Titãs
- 1993: Inside the Eye - Skin Yard
- 1993: Toreador of Love - Hazel
- 1993: Painkiller - Babes in Toyland
- 1993: Here I Come and Other Hits - Fallouts
- 1993: Vena Cava - Dirt Fishermen
- 1993: Worth dying for - Boghandle

== 1994 ==
- 1994: Whiskey for the Holy Ghost - Mark Lanegan
- 1994: Guillotina - Guillotina
- 1994: Kerbdog - Kerbdog
- 1994: ¡Viva Zapata! - 7 Year Bitch
- 1994: Where Am I? - Mike Johnson
- 1994: Let's Give it a Twist - Fitz of Depression
- 1994: No Return in the End - Smashing Orange
- 1994: Dive - Burning Heads
- 1994: Scream Clown Scream - Dancing French Liberals of '48
- 1994: The Shrill Beeps of Shrimp - Gas Huffer

== 1995 ==
- 1995: My Brother the Cow - Mudhoney
- 1995: Infrared Riding Hood - Tad
- 1995: Return to Olympus - Malfunkshun (tracking only)
- 1995: Domingo - Titãs
- 1995: The Wilderness Years - Terry Lee Hale

== 1996 ==
- 1996: Skunkworks - Bruce Dickinson
- 1996: Swing - Fitz of Depression
- 1996: Fear of Girls - Bluebottle Kiss
- 1996: Hype! the Motion Picture Soundtrack - Various Artists
- 1996: Rock Mata Pop - Guillotina

== 1997 ==
- 1997: Tres Homeboys - Shark Chum
- 1997: Have a Nice Day, Motherfucker - Mono Men
- 1997: Seven Years Golden - The Thrown Ups

== 1998 ==
- 1998: Kicked in the Teeth - ZEKE
- 1998: Ten Minute Warning - Ten Minute Warning (mix only)
- 1998: Live in Canada and Australia - Spiderbait
- 1998: O Que Voce Quiser - Baba Cosmica
- 1998: Psychopathia Sexualis - The Makers
- 1998: Empty Bottles, Broken Hearts - Murder City Devils
- 1998: Mientras El Resto Sigue - Guillotina
- 1998: Circular - Escarbarme

== 1999 ==
- 1999: Nebula/Lowrider - Nebula
- 1999: Sun Creature - Nebula
- 1999: Vague Premonition - Elevator Through
- 1999: The Black Halos - The Black Halos
- 1999: Watts - Watts
- 1999: Trance States in Tongue - Zen Guerrilla
- 1999: To the Center - Nebula
- 1999: Greatest Rock 'n' Roll Band in the World - Supersuckers
- 1999: Escape - Burning Heads
- 1999: When the Word's On Fire - Quadrajets
- 1999: Kicked Out - RC5
- 1999: As Dez Mais - Titãs

== 2000 ==
- 2000: Erre O Ce Ka - Guillotina
- 2000: March to Fuzz - Mudhoney
- 2000: Chemical Love Songs - More Republica Masonica
- 2000: Sessions '86-'88 - Bundle of Hiss
- 2000: Live from the Battle in Seattle - The No WTO Combo
- 2000: Seafish Louisville - The Gits
- 2000: Electric Children - The Monkeywrench

== 2001 ==
- 2001: The Violent Years - The Black Halos
- 2001: The Grannies - The Grannies
- 2001: Kung Fu Cocktail Grip - Hog Molly
- 2001: What's in a Name? - The Fartz
- 2001: Gangsterland - Bluebottle Kiss
- 2001: Para Quando o Arco-Íris Encontrar o Pote de Ouro - Nando Reis
- 2001: Shadows on the Sun - Zen Guerilla
- 2001: Shameless - Therapy?
- 2001: American Rock and Roll - RC5
- 2001: Start at the Top - Skin Yard
- 2001: A Melhor Banda de Todos os Tempos da Última Semana - Titãs

== 2002 ==
- 2002: Nirvana - Nirvana (worked on two songs)
- 2002: Plasmic Tears and the Invisible City - Zen Guerilla
- 2002: Heavy Mellow 'Live' - Zen Guerilla
- 2002: Taste the Walker - The Grannies
- 2002: The Rest of Us - Gas Huffer
- 2002: Injustice - The Fartz
- 2002: Dos EPs - Nebula
- 2002: Dirty Power - Dirty Power
- 2002: Vandalism: Beautiful as a Rock in a Cop's Face - Feederz
- 2002: Make Up the Breakdown - Hot Hot Heat

== 2003 ==
- 2003: Replica - Upwell
- 2003: Ordinary Miracles - Post Stardom Depression
- 2003: Frenching the Bully - The Gits
- 2003: CODEX1980 - SOLGER
- 2003: The Seattle Sessions - The Spades
- 2003: Enter: The Conquering Chicken - The Gits
- 2003: The Set-up - The Boss Martians
- 2003: Dancing - Harkonen

== 2004 ==
- 2004: Optimus Rhyme - Optimus Rhyme
- 2004: Gotta Getaway! - RC5
- 2004: Kultura-Dictatura - Kultur Shock
- 2004: 'Til the Livin' End - ZEKE
- 2004: Like a Virgin EP - Harkonen/These Arms are Snakes
- 2004: Gold Star EP - Common Heroes
- 2004: Going South - Going South
- 2004: Nibble the Giblet - Nitwitz
- 2004: The ShakeDowns - The ShakeDowns
- 2004: Erected Lady Man - The Grannies
- 2004: Les Hell on Heels - Les Hell on Heels
- 2004: Volumen - Guillotina
- 2004: Dead Gone - Winnebago Deal
- 2004: Watch Me Burn - The Spazms
- 2004: Stripped - The Makers
- 2004: With the Lights Out - Nirvana
- 2004: Loud Fast Rock & Roll - Thunderfist

== 2005 ==
- 2005: Number Nine - Upwell
- 2005: Oh Martha! - The Accüsed
- 2005: Alive Without Control - The Black Halos
- 2005: ZEKE and Peter Pan Speedrock Split - ZEKE
- 2005: Nice 'n' Ruff: Hard Soul Hits Vol. 1 - The DT's
- 2005: A Comet Tale Life - Jodi Hates The World
- 2005: Everybody Rise! - The Makers
- 2005: MTV ao Vivo - Titãs
- 2005: Public Domain: The Best of Lucid Nation - Lucid Nation
- 2005: Permanent Fatal Error - Jack Endino
- 2005: Sliver: The Best of the Box - Nirvana

== 2006 ==
- 2006: Sleepless in Seattle: Birth of Grunge - Various Artists
- 2006: The Baked Tapes - The Accüsed
- 2006: School the Indie Rockers - Optimus Rhyme
- 2006: Flight of the Raven - Winnebago Deal
- 2006: Gumjob - The Grannies
- 2006: Boxriff EP - The Atomic Bitchwax
- 2006: Too Fat For Love - Thunderfist

== 2007 ==
- 2007: Filthy Habits - The DT's
- 2007: Teach Your Bird to Sing - Swallow
- 2007: Time Wasted is Not Wasted Time - Kandi Coded
- 2007: Incontinence (Outtakes & Demos) - The Grannies
- 2007: Death Is This Communion - High on Fire
- 2007: He Dies in Rocket School - Optimus Rhyme
- 2007: Dogs, Record & Wine - Les Hell on Heels
- 2007: Chemical Wedding - Chemical Wedding

== 2008 ==
- 2008: Live in Europe - Kultur Shock
- 2008: We Are Not Alone - The Black Halos
- 2008: Sell the Sky - Upwell
- 2008: Sub Pop 300 - Various Artists
- 2008: Immortalizer - Valient Thorr
- 2008: One Million Dollar Surf Band - The Dead Rocks
- 2008: Tectonica - Slippage
- 2008: Back to Monkey City - Jeff Dahl
- 2008: Pressure in the S.O.D.O - The Boss Martians
- 2008: Guns of Nevada - Guns of Nevada
- 2008: Wishing Well - The Black Clouds
- 2008: An Overdose Of Death… - Toxic Holocaust

== 2009 ==
- 2009: Love/Fight - Flipper
- 2009: Here Waits Thy Doom - 3 Inches of Blood
- 2009: Breathing the Fire - Skeletonwitch

== 2010 ==
- 2010: Stranger - Valient Thorr
- 2010: DAMN! – Dragstrip Riot
- 2010: Infant Free Dumpster - The Sex Zombies

== 2011-2020 ==
- 2011: Set the Dial – Black Tusk
- 2011: Resistance - The Ganjas
- 2011: For Those About to Forget to Rock - The Grannies
- 2012: Sei - Nando Reis
- 2012: Home Burial – Dead Language
- 2013: EP – Jackrabbit Starts
- 2013: Early Frost – Heiress
- 2014: Fatten the Leeches - Cancers
- 2014: Mirror Distortion - Rampant Lion
- 2015: 8894 - Banda de la Muerte
- 2015: Grief's Infernal Flower - Windhand
- 2015: “Holograma” - Adelaida
- 2015: “Adormidera” - Adelaida
- 2016: Juventud Sónica - Artificiales
- 2016: Jardim-Pomar - Nando Reis
- 2016: Psychofiction EP - Wild Parade
- 2017: Post Tenebras Lux - Yajaira
- 2017: Escape - Denver Meatpacking Company
- 2018: “Fantasma” - Adelaida
- 2018: Eternal Return - Windhand
- 2019: Cobain and Cornbread - The Black Tones
- 2019: Sunday Night Panic - Every Color Fades
- 2020: Mystic Goddess - Robots of the Ancient World
- 2020: Stay Evil (EP) - Black Ends

== 2021-present ==
- 2021: Safety Off - Safety Off (recorded in 2007)
- 2021: Kick Out the Grams - The Foilies
- 2021: - Sonic Medicine
- 2021: “Worze than the cure”EP - WARTZ
- 2021: Nominal AF - The Starhoppers
- 2023: Retrovisor - Adelaida
- 2023: My Own Dead / Song for a Sickhead - Black Ends
- 2024: Speck - WEEP WAVE
- 2024: Leviathan Project - MCMLXXXII
- 2024: Bambi - MUNẼCA
- 2024: Uma Estrela Misteriosa Revelará o Segredo - Nando Reis
- 2025: Vapor Rosa - Pink Steam
- 2026: 131217 - Sex Shop Mushrooms
