= Hall of Justice (studio) =

Seattle recording studio

Coordinates: 47°39′30″N 122°21′50″W

Hall of Justice Recording
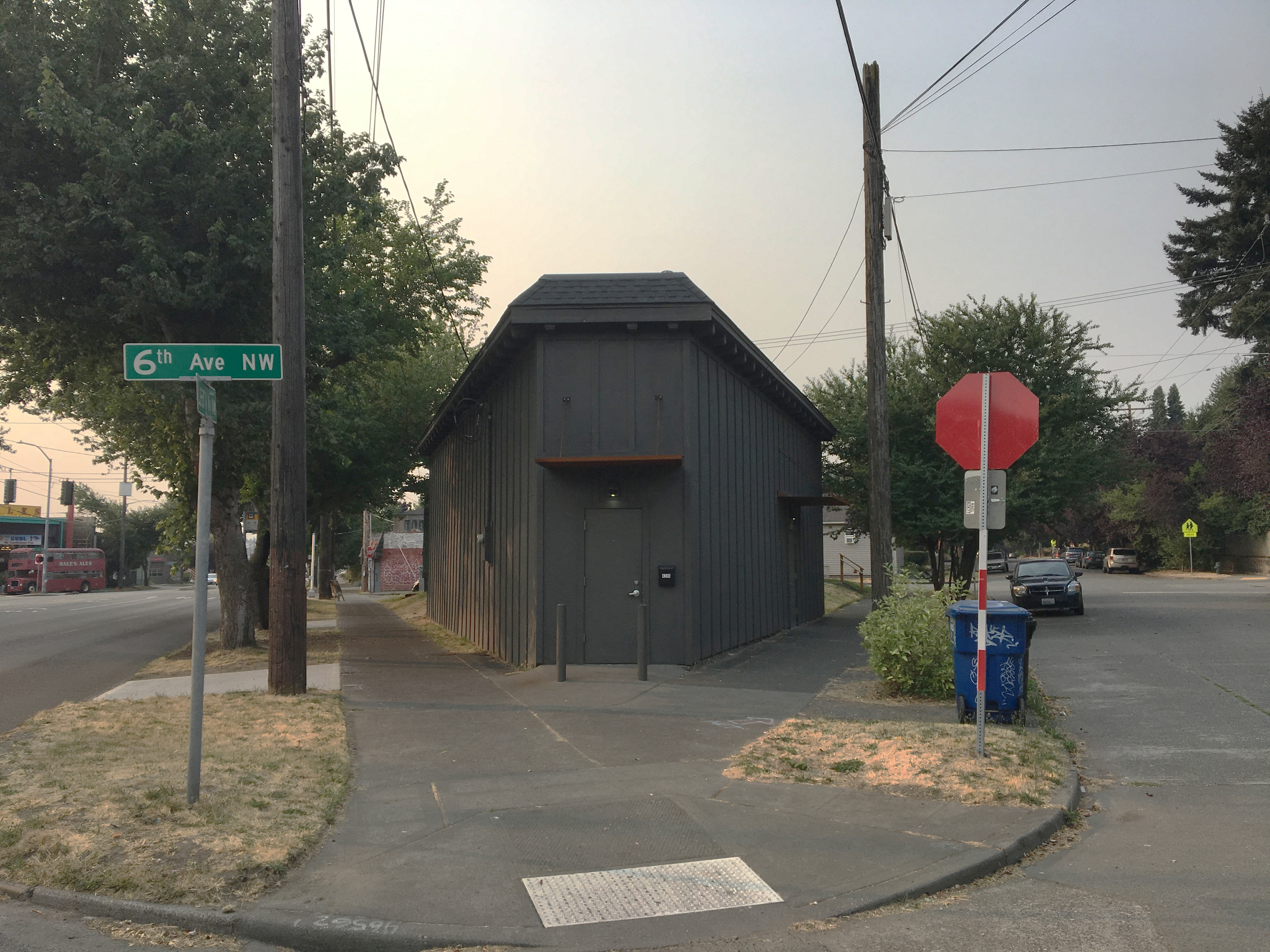
- The building pictured in 2017.
- Interactive map of Hall of Justice Recording
- Address: 4230 Leary Way NW
- Location: Seattle, Washington

Construction
- Opened: 1976 (as Triangle); 1986 (as Reciprocal); 1991 (as Word of Mouth); 1993 (as John & Stu's); 2000 (as Hall of Justice)

The Hall of Justice is a recording studio in the Ballard neighborhood of Seattle, Washington. The triangular-shaped building, which has changed ownership and purpose throughout its century-old history, has functioned as a studio for rock bands since the 1970s. The windowless, unassuming space has been home to the recordings of albums by seminal indie rock bands, including Nirvana, Soundgarden, Death Cab for Cutie, Fleet Foxes, the Decemberists, Sleater-Kinney, Built to Spill, Modest Mouse, and more.

Originally a produce stand, the building was first opened as a studio under the name Triangle Recording between 1976 and 1986. Later, the studio first became popularly known as a partial birthplace of grunge, with countless early acts of the genre utilizing the space, then widely known as Reciprocal Recording (1986–91). After several years as John & Stu's, the studio was operated by musician and producer Chris Walla under its current name since 2000. Walla sold the space to a group of Seattle musicians in 2025, who have retained the name.

== History ==
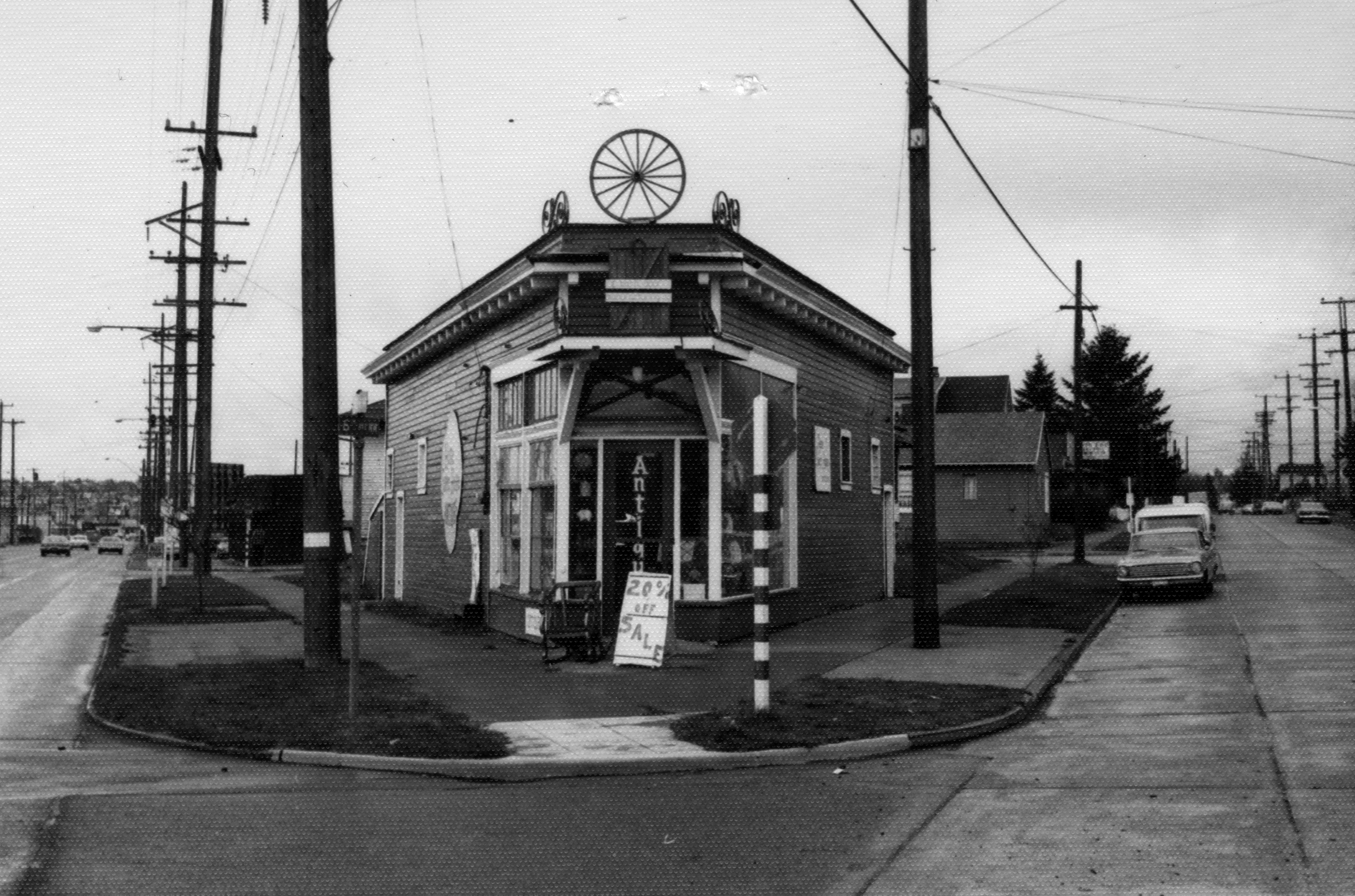
The building as an antique store in the 1970s.

=== Early history ===
The complex first opened as a produce stand in 1911. It served as a retail location for most of the twentieth century, and was vacant by the 1970s. Jack Weaver purchased the space and named it Triangle Recording in 1976, recording a series of 7"s by bands like Pell Mell and the Blackouts.

Chris Hanzsek and Jack Endino moved into the space in June 1986, renaming the studio Reciprocal Recording. The studio became famously responsible for all but inventing the grunge movement; Soundgarden and Nirvana recorded early demos at the studio, with the latter completing its debut album Bleach (1989) at Reciprocal. Hanzsek left the space in 1991, while engineer Rich Hinklin continued on, renaming the complex Word of Mouth. In 1993, the space was renamed again to John & Stu's, named after producers John Goodmanson and Stuart Hallerman. Goodmanson, Hallerman, and Phil Ek utilized the space to track dozens of bands, including Sleater-Kinney, Harvey Danger, Built to Spill, and Modest Mouse.

=== Recent years ===
In 2000, in partnership with Barsuk Records, musician and producer Chris Walla began overseeing the space. Walla began working as a producer with Nada Surf, Hot Hot Heat, and the Decemberists, as well as with his main project Death Cab for Cutie, with whom he recorded Transatlanticism (2003). Death Cab took over the lease in 2004 and used the studio as a practice space for four years. In 2010, Robin Pecknold of Fleet Foxes took over the complex, reverting it to it former name Reciprocal. A writer for Spin described the space in a 2011 cover story: "The windowless exterior was once painted brown, but the color has faded and flecked off. Cracked shingles curl up off the roof, and inside the studio, tattered walls and well-worn carpeting give it all the charm of an abandoned church basement."

Walla returned to the studio in 2011, and oversaw an extensive renovation of the space. Walla has continued to record bands in the space, including Lo Moon, the Paper Kites, and Ratboys.

In 2025, Walla sold the studio to local musicians Mike V. Davis, Sam Rosson, Mikey Ferrario, and James Kasinger. Walla had sought someone else to run the studio after moving overseas in 2014, as it was difficult to manage Hall of Justice from afar while still recording bands during visits to Seattle. Its new owners launched community classes to teach studio basics while generating revenue, ensuring the nearly 50-year-old studio remains a creative hub for future generations. Clients have included Pool Kids, Alvvays, and Pinegrove.

== Discography ==
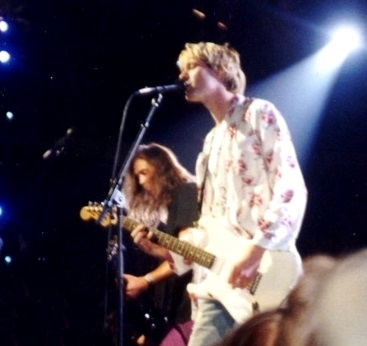
Nirvana recorded their first album, 1989's Bleach at the studio.

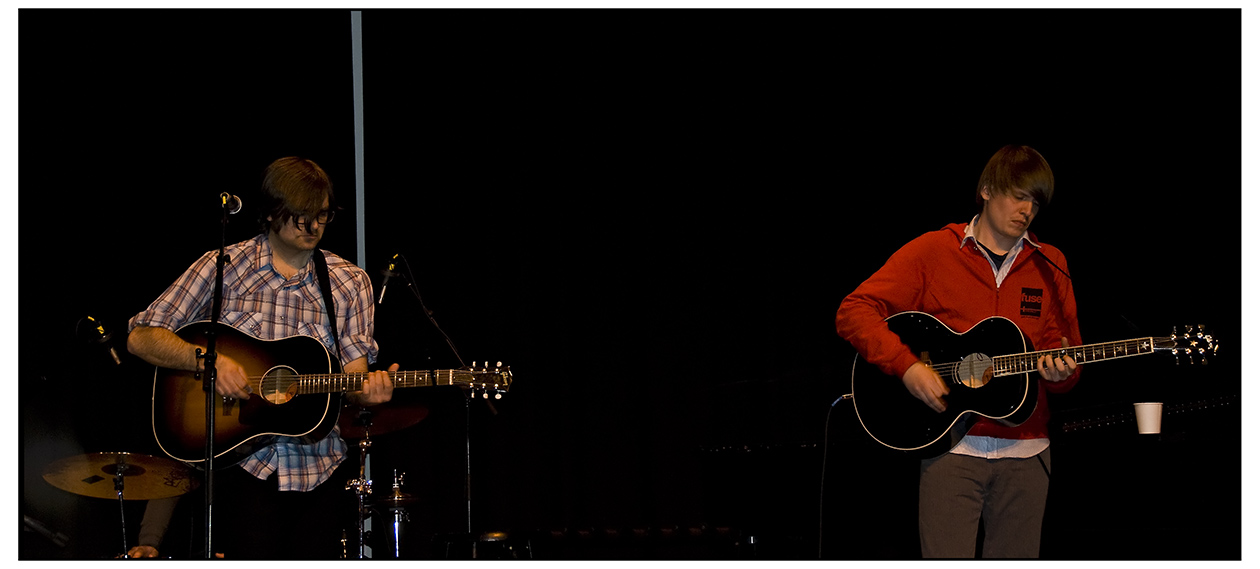
Death Cab for Cutie used the studio as a practice and recording space, including for Transatlanticism (2003).

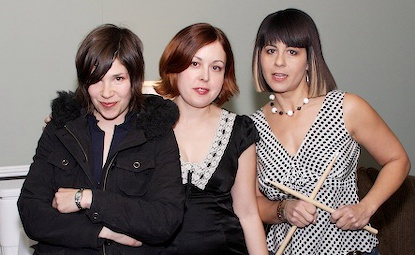
Sleater-Kinney made two albums when it was John & Stu's.

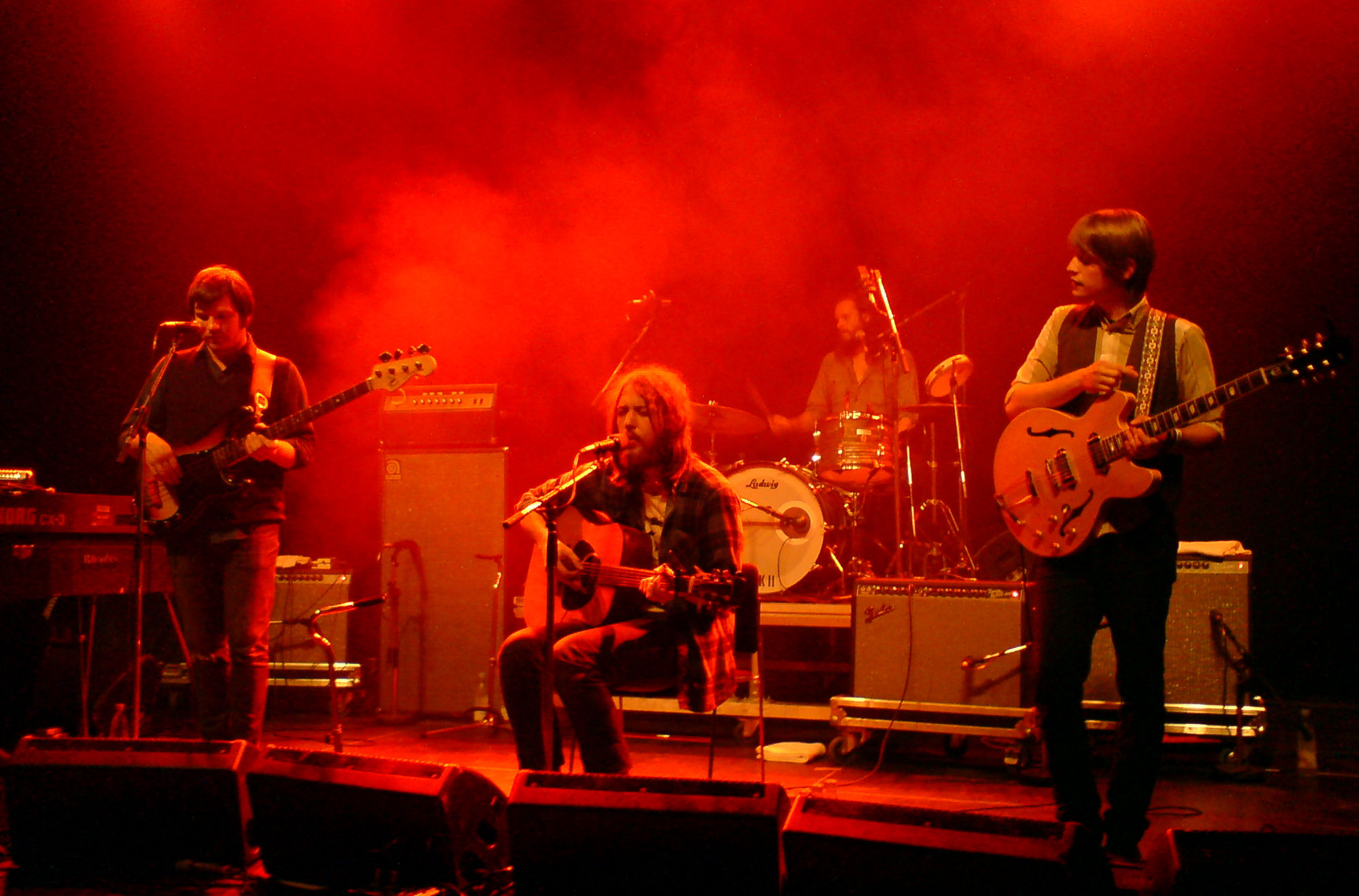
Fleet Foxes briefly oversaw the space and reverted to its former name between 2010 and 2011.

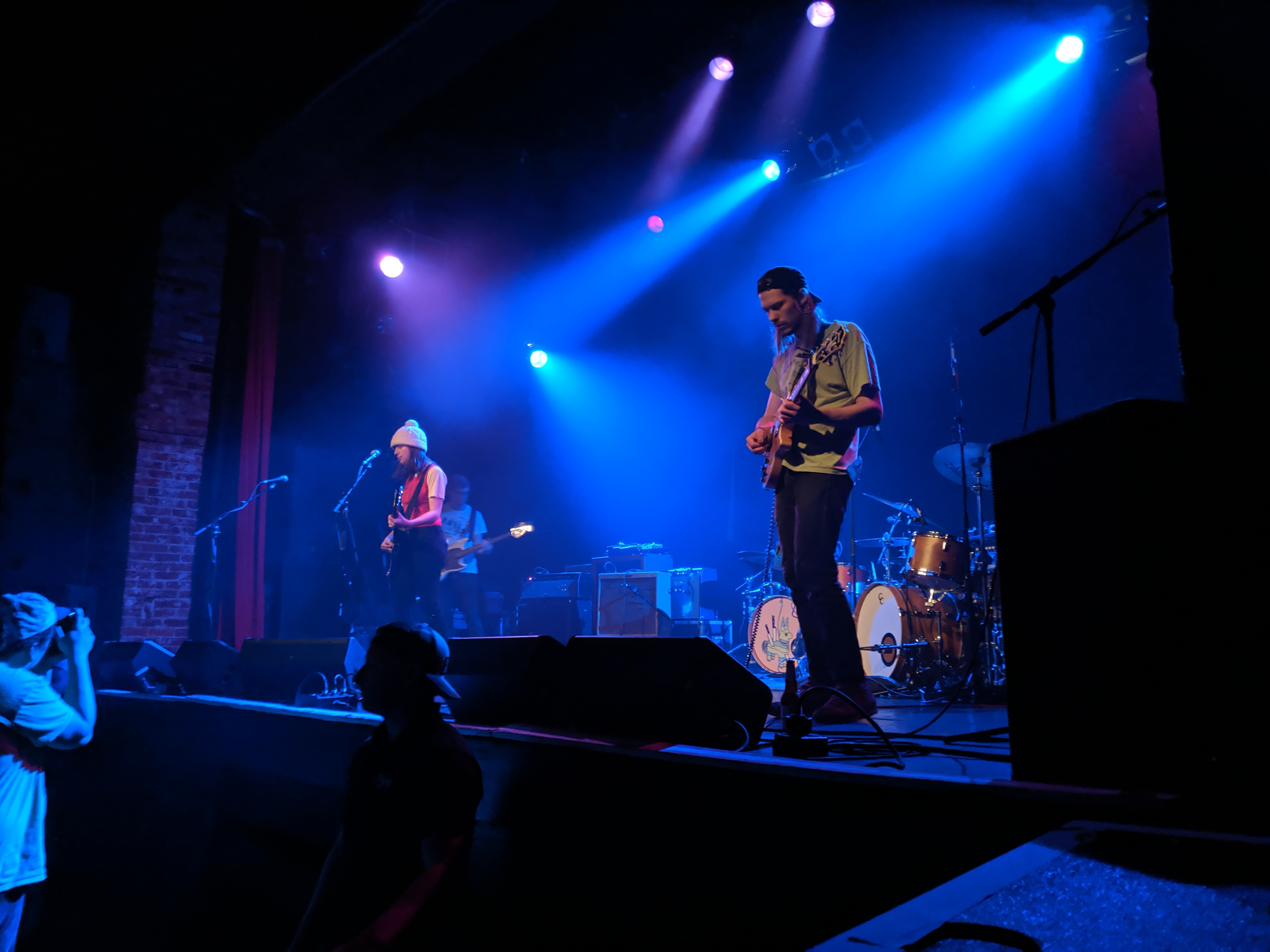
More recent artists to utilize the space include Ratboys.

Year	Artist	Recording
1987	Green River	Dry as a Bone
1987	Soundgarden	Screaming Life
1988	Ted Ed Fred	Dale Crover demo tape
1988	Skin Yard	Hallowed Ground
1988	Nirvana	"Love Buzz"
1989	Tad	God's Balls
1989	Screaming Trees	Buzz Factory
1989	Nirvana	Bleach
1989	Mudhoney	Mudhoney
1989	Various Artists	Another Pyrrhic Victory
1990	Mark Lanegan	The Winding Sheet
1990	Skin Yard	Fist Sized Chunks
1990	Nirvana	"Sappy"
1990	Nirvana	"Sliver"
1990	Gruntruck	Inside Yours
1991	Skin Yard	1000 Smiling Knuckles
1992	Nirvana	In Utero demo sessions
1994	Built to Spill	There's Nothing Wrong with Love
1995	Malfunkshun	Return to Olympus
1996	Low	The Curtain Hits the Cast
1997	Blonde Redhead	Fake Can Be Just as Good
1997	Harvey Danger	Where Have All The Merrymakers Gone?
1997	Modest Mouse	The Lonesome Crowded West
1997	Sleater-Kinney	Dig Me Out
2000	Sleater-Kinney	All Hands on the Bad One
2000	Kind of Like Spitting	Nothing Makes Sense Without It
2001	Death Cab for Cutie	The Photo Album
2002	Carissa's Wierd	Songs About Leaving
2002	Hot Hot Heat	Knock Knock Knock
2002	The Long Winters	The Worst You Can Do Is Harm
2003	Death Cab for Cutie	Transatlanticism
2003	The Postal Service	Give Up
2003	The Thermals	More Parts per Million
2005	Death Cab for Cutie	Plans
2005	The Decemberists	Picaresque
2005	Nada Surf	The Weight Is a Gift
2011	Fleet Foxes	Helplessness Blues
2017	Great Grandpa	Plastic Cough
2017	Special Explosion	To Infinity
2017	Minus the Bear	Voids
2018	Lo Moon	Lo Moon
2019	Great Grandpa	Four of Arrows
2019	Pedro the Lion	Phoenix
2020	Deep Sea Diver	Impossible Weight
2021	Kississippi	Mood Ring
2023	Ratboys	The Window
