= Hallowed Ground (Skin Yard album) =

Studio album by Skin Yard
- Released: September 1988
- Recorded: 1988
- Studios: Reciprocal Recording, Seattle, Washington
- Genre: Grunge Heavy Grunge
- Length: 46:13
- Label: Toxic Shock
- Producer: Jack Endino

Skin Yard chronology
Skin Yard (1986)	Hallowed Ground (1988)	Fist Sized Chunks (1990)

Professional ratings
Review scores
Source	Rating
AllMusic	3.5/5 stars

Hallowed Ground is the second studio album by grunge band, Skin Yard, released in 1988.

== Track listing ==
1. "Stranger" (music: House/Endino/McCullum; lyrics: McMillan) – 3:36
2. "Open Fist" (music: House/Endino; lyrics: McMillan) – 3:58
3. "G.O.D." (music: House/Endino; lyrics: McMillan) – 5:29
4. "Needle Tree" (music: House/McCullum; lyrics: McMillan) – 3:13
5. "Burn" (music: House/Endino; lyrics: McMillan) – 4:55
6. "Hallowed Ground" (music: House/Endino; lyrics: McMillan) – 3:11
7. "In the Black House" (music & lyrics: McMillan) – 5:36
8. "Throb" (music: House/Endino; lyrics: McMillan) – 5:50
9. "OP4" (House/Endino/Nerm) – 4:49

The CD reissue of the album had two bonus tracks:

1. "Wither" (music: House/Endino/McCullum; lyrics: McMillan) – 3:00
2. "American Nightmare" (music: Endino; lyrics: McMillan) – 2:29

== Personnel ==
- Jack Endino – guitar, producer, engineering
- Daniel House – bass
- Scott McCullum – drums
- Ben McMillan – vocals
