= Start at the Top =

Compilation album by Skin Yard
- Released: 2001
- Genre: Grunge
- Label: C/Z

Skin Yard chronology
Inside the Eye (1993)	Start at the Top (2001)

Professional ratings
Review scores
Source	Rating
Allmusic	3.5/5 stars

Start at the Top is a compilation album by American rock band Skin Yard, released in 2001 by C/Z Records.

== Overview ==
The album is a hand-numbered limited release CD compiling a number of never-before-heard tracks and several previously vinyl-only recordings. Included are Skin Yard's Sub Pop single, their "Stranger" single (on Toxic Shock Records), "Machine Gun Etiquette" from The Damned covers comp., and Ace Frehley's "Snow Blind" from the Kiss compilation (also on C/Z Records).

== Track listing ==
1. "Start at the Top" (House, McMillan) - 3:06
2. "Watch" (McMillan) - 3:24
3. "Jump the Wall (Gentle Collapse)" (Endino, House, McMillan) - 6:22
4. "Machine Gun Etiquette" (The Damned) - 1:41
5. "Twelve Points" (Endino, House) - 3:39
6. "Make Room" (McMillan, Skin Yard) - 3:05
7. "Snow Blind" (Ace Frehley) - 3:57
8. "Hey Bulldog (Alternate version)" (Lennon-McCartney) - 3:12
9. "This Lonely Place" (House, McMillan) - 4:47
10. "NWAP II" (Skin Yard) - 2:06
11. "The Ha-Ha" (House) - 2:28
12. "No Right (Jason version)" (Endino, House, McMillan) - 7:50

== Personnel ==
Musical

- Ben McMillan - vocals
- Jack Endino - guitar
- Daniel House - bass
- Jason Finn - drums (3, 9, 11, 12)
- Barrett Martin - drums (4, 8, 10)
- Matt Cameron - drums (5, 6)
- Scott McCullum - drums (1, 2, 7)

Production

- Ken Kelly - cover painting
- Gary Bedell - graphic design, photography
- Arthur Aubry - photography
