= Fist Sized Chunks =

Studio album by Skin Yard
- Released: May 8, 1990
- Recorded: Spring 1989
- Studio: Reciprocal Recording, Seattle, Washington
- Genre: Grunge
- Label: Cruz Records
- Producer: Skin Yard

Skin Yard chronology
Hallowed Ground (1988)	Fist Sized Chunks (1990)	1000 Smiling Knuckles (1991)

Professional ratings
Review scores
Source	Rating
Allmusic	3/5 stars

Fist Sized Chunks is the third studio album by the grunge band Skin Yard. It was released in 1990 on Cruz Records.

== Track listing ==
1. "Slow Runner"
2. "Go to Sleep"
3. "No Control"
4. "Through Nothing"
5. "Hungry and Hanging"
6. "Ritual Room"
7. "Over the Moon"
8. "Drunk on Kerosene"
9. "Gentle Collapse"
10. "No Right" (CD only)

== Fist Re-Mixed ==
In 2012 Jack Endino released a remixed version of the album with an additional song ("Wither").

Track listing

1. "Slow Runner"
2. "Go to Sleep"
3. "No Control"
4. "Through Nothing"
5. "Hungry and Hanging"
6. "Ritual Room"
7. "Over the Moon"
8. "Drunk on Kerosene"
9. "Wither"
10. "No Right"
11. "Gentle Collapse"

== Personnel ==
- Jack Endino - Guitar
- Daniel House - Bass
- Ben McMillan - Vocals, bass
- Norman Scott - Drums, guitar
- Tom Accused - Guitar (on Slow Runner)
- Helios Creed - Guitar (on Gentle Collapse)
- Michael Lavine - Photography
- Lisa Orth - Artwork
