= Fuck Me I'm Rich =

Compilation album

Compilation album by Sub Pop Records
- Released: 1990
- Genre: Grunge
- Length: 31:42
- Label: Waterfront Records

Sub Pop Records chronology
Sub Pop 200 (1988)	Fuck Me I'm Rich (1990)	The Grunge Years (1991)

Professional ratings
Review scores
Source	Rating
Allmusic	2.5/5 stars

Fuck Me I'm Rich was a grunge compilation album released by Waterfront Records in 1990. Each of the songs are available on each artists respective albums. The album includes ten songs, two by each of the five artists. The title of the album is a play on the words of the Mudhoney song "Touch Me I'm Sick," which is featured on the album.

== Track listing ==
1. Mudhoney - "Touch Me I'm Sick"
2. Tad - "Ritual Device"
3. Blood Circus - "Two Way Street"
4. Swallow - "Trapped"
5. Soundgarden - "Hunted Down"
6. Mudhoney - "In 'N' Out Of Grace"
7. Tad - "Daisy"
8. Blood Circus - "Six Foot Under"
9. Swallow - "Guts"
10. Soundgarden - "Nothing To Say"

The two Mudhoney songs are from Superfuzz Bigmuff. The two Soundgarden songs are from Screaming Life and the two Blood Circus songs are from Primal Rock Therapy.
