= Janitors of Tomorrow =

Janitors Of Tomorrow

Studio album by Gas Huffer
- Released: 1991
- Recorded: Reciprocal Recording in Seattle, Washington
- Genres: Garage rock, punk blues
- Label: Empty Records
- Producer: Jack Endino

Gas Huffer chronology
| Janitors Of Tomorrow (1991) | Integrity, Technology & Service (1992) |

Professional ratings
Review scores
| Source | Rating |
|---|---|
| AllMusic | 3/5 stars |

Janitors of Tomorrow is the debut full-length album released by the band Gas Huffer in 1991.

== Track listing ==
1. "Nisqually" – 2:16
2. "Shoe Factory" – 2:33
3. "Night Train To Spokane" – 2:16
4. "Going To Las Vegas" – 2:14
5. "Dangerous Drifter" – 1:55
6. "Robert" – 2:51
7. "Mistake" – 2:06
8. "All That Guff" – 1:43
9. "Lizard Hunt" – 3:05
10. "Insidious" – 4:26
11. "Love Comes Creeping" – 2:10
12. "Compromise In The Dark" – 3:02
13. "Girl I Need Your Lovin' (Right Now)" – 3:01
14. "Want To Kiss You" – 2:00
15. "Eat You Whole" – 1:40
16. "Buck Naked" – 1:40
17. "Mouthful" – 2:00
18. "Firebug" – 1:47
19. "Jesus Was My Only Friend" – 2:29
