= The Rest of Us =

The Rest of Us may refer to:

- The Rest of Us (album), a 2002 album by Gas Huffer
- The Rest of Us (film), a 2019 film directed by Aisling Chin-Lee
