= 1000 Smiling Knuckles =

Studio album by Skin Yard
- Released: August 6, 1991
- Recorded: Late 1990, early 1991
- Studio: Reciprocal, Seattle, Washington
- Genre: Grunge
- Length: 34:42
- Label: Cruz
- Producer: Jack Endino, Skin Yard

Skin Yard chronology
Fist Sized Chunks (1990)	1000 Smiling Knuckles (1991)	Inside the Eye (1993)

1000 Smiling Knuckles is the fourth studio album by American grunge band Skin Yard. The cover art is by Jim Blanchard. The first single was the title track, for which a video was shot.

== Critical reception ==
Professional ratings
Review scores
Source	Rating
AllMusic	4/5 stars

The Chicago Tribune noted that "the band's rhythm section is better-recorded and Ben McMillan is actually trying to sing melody lines instead of just shouting over the din."

== Track listing ==
All lyrics are written by McMillan.

No.	Title	Music	Length
1.	"1000 Smiling Knuckles"	Endino	3:26
2.	"River Throat"	House/Endino	3:22
3.	"Words on Bone"	House/Endino	4:21
4.	"Living Pool"	Endino	3:02
5.	"Headswill"	Endino/House/McMillan	3:03
6.	"Psychoriflepowerhypnotized"	Endino/House	2:59
7.	"Material Freak"	House/Endino	3:33
8.	"Jezechrist"	House/Endino	4:22
9.	"Nietzsche with a Pizza"	Endino/House/Martin	1:32
10.	"Burn a Hole"	House/Endino/McMillan/Martin	4:55

== Personnel ==
- Jack Endino – guitar, producer, engineering
- Daniel House – bass, art direction
- Barrett Martin – drums
- Ben McMillan – vocals
- Jim Blanchard – artwork
