= Primal Rock Therapy =

Studio album by Blood Circus
- Released: 1989; CD reissue in 1992
- Recorded: 1988–1989
- Studios: Reciprocal, Seattle, Washington
- Genre: Grunge
- Label: Sub Pop
- Producer: Jack Endino

Professional ratings
Review scores
| Source | Rating |
|---|---|
| AllMusic | 2.5/5 stars |

Primal Rock Therapy is an EP by Seattle grunge band Blood Circus, released in 1989 by Sub Pop. It was reissued on CD in 1992 with seven additional 1989 tracks: the band's first non-album single and five unreleased tracks. It was produced by grunge producer and Skin Yard guitarist Jack Endino. Music photographer Charles Peterson shot the cover image.

Although Blood Circus was one of the original bands on the grunge scene in the late 1980s, and Primal Rock Therapy has since been recognized for its historic status as one of the first grunge albums ever released, critics panned the album at the time of its release, making it one of the poorest-selling albums ever released on Sub Pop.

== Track listing ==
Original release

1. "Road to Hell"
2. "Part of the Crowd"
3. "My Dad's Dead"
4. "Lime Green"
5. "Gnarly"

Reissue

1. "Two Way Street" - 2:53
2. "Six Foot Under" - 3:52
3. "My Dad's Dead" - 2:27
4. "Lime Green" - 3:00
5. "Gnarly" - 3:26
6. "Road to Hell" - 5:10
7. "Part of the Crowd" - 3:17
8. "White Dress" - 1:53
9. "Green Room" - 2:10
10. "Electric Johnny" - 4:34
11. "Sea Chanty" - 4:42
12. "Bloodman" - 3:16
