= Push (Gruntruck album) =

Studio album by Gruntruck
- Released: 1992
- Recorded: 1992
- Studio: Red Farm Films
- Genre: Grunge
- Length: 53:47
- Label: Roadrunner
- Producers: Jack Endino, Gary King

Gruntruck chronology
Inside Yours (1990)	Push (1992)	Shot, Illusion, New God (1996)

Singles from Push
- 1. "Above Me"; 2. "Crazy Love"; 3. "Tribe"

Push is the second album by the American grunge band Gruntruck. It was released in 1992 by Roadrunner Records. The album contains "Tribe", "Crazy Love", and "Above Me", which were released as singles. The band supported the album by touring with Alice in Chains and Screaming Trees.

== Production ==
Recorded at Seattle's Red Farm Films Studio, the album was produced by Jack Endino and Gary King. It cost $12,000 to record.

== Critical reception ==
Professional ratings
Review scores
Source	Rating
AllMusic	4/5 stars
Kerrang!	4/5 stars

The Washington Post noted that "the hooks to songs such as 'Machine Action' and 'Crazy Love' recall Nirvana, a perhaps unwelcome but nonetheless accurate comparison." Billboard wrote that Gruntruck "may not have the musical moxie to push them above [Seattle's] wall of grunge, but they're capable of dishing out some decent songs with coherent melodies, effective arrangements and a good measure of passion."

USA Today praised the production of Endino, writing that "most of the ditties encourage a unique brand of booty shakin', not headbanging," while noting that "guitarist Tommy Niemeyer ... still rips out E string-based metal from opening cut 'Tribe' to the final tune, 'Push'." The Seattle Times deemed the album "grunge-meets-psychedelia."

== Accolades ==
Publication	Country	Accolade	Year	Rank
Kerrang!	United Kingdom	"Albums of the Year"	1992	18

== Track listing ==
All tracks composed by Ben McMillan excepted where noted.

No.	Title	Length
1.	"Tribe"	4:21
2.	"Machine Action" (McMillan/Tom Niemeyer)	5:40
3.	"Racked"	4:11
4.	"Crazy Love" (McMillan/Niemeyer/Tim Paul)	4:54
5.	"Above Me" (McMillan/Niemeyer/Norman Scott)	4:59
6.	"Gotta Believe" (McMillan/Niemeyer)	4:02
7.	"Break" (McMillan/Niemeyer/Paul/Scott)	4:42
8.	"Slow Scorch"	5:00
9.	"Follow"	4:39
10.	"Body Farm"	3:09
11.	"Lose"	5:00
12.	"Push"	3:11
Total length:		53:47

== Personnel ==
- Ben McMillan – vocals, guitar
- Tom Niemeyer – guitar
- Tim Paul – bass
- Norman Scott – drums
