= The Inhuman Ordeal of Special Agent Gas Huffer =

The Inhuman Ordeal Of Special Agent Gas Huffer

Studio album by Gas Huffer
- Released: 1996
- Recorded: 1995
- Studio: Egg, Seattle
- Genre: Garage punk
- Label: Epitaph
- Producer: Kurt Bloch

Gas Huffer chronology
One Inch Masters (1994)	The Inhuman Ordeal Of Special Agent Gas Huffer (1996)	Just Beautiful Music (1998)

Professional ratings
Review scores
Source	Rating
AllMusic	4/5 stars

The Inhuman Ordeal of Special Agent Gas Huffer is the fourth full-length album released by the band Gas Huffer. It was released in 1996.

== Track listing ==
1. "You Are Not Your Job"
2. "Fall of the Kingfish"
3. "Sixty Three Hours"
4. "Mosquito Stomp"
5. "Carolina Hot Foot"
6. "Matt's Mood"
7. "Smile No More"
8. "Tiny Life"
9. "Double-O-Bum"
10. "The Sin of Sloth"
11. "Numbnuts Cold"
12. "Discovery Park"
13. "Money: 1, Fun: 0"
14. "Plant You Now"
