= A Modern Life =

Studio album by Lo Moon
- Released: 25 February 2022
- Length: 36:27
- Labels: Thirty Tigers; The Orchard

Lo Moon chronology
Lo Moon (2018)	A Modern Life (2022)	I Wish You More Than Luck (2024)

Singles from A Modern Life
- 1. "Dream Never Dies" Released: 10 November 2021; 2. "Raincoats" Released: 12 January 2022; 3. "Stop" Released: 9 February 2022

A Modern Life is the second studio album from the Los Angeles-based band Lo Moon released on February 25, 2022.

== Track listing ==
A Modern Life track listing
No.	Title	Length
1.	"Intro"	0:35
2.	"Carried Away"	4:31
3.	"Dream Never Dies"	4:44
4.	"Expectations"	3:49
5.	"Deficit of Wonder"	1:04
6.	"Modern Life"	3:51
7.	"Raincoats"	4:06
8.	"Digging Up the Dead"	4:21
9.	"Eyes on the Prize"	3:55
10.	"Stop"	5:23
Total length:		36:27

Professional ratings
Review scores
Source	Rating
The Upcoming	4/5 stars
The Prog Mind	9/10 stars
