= Plastic Cough =

Studio album by Great Grandpa
- Released: 2017
- Genre: Indie rock
- Length: 56:28
- Label: Double Double Whammy

Great Grandpa chronology
Plastic Cough (2017)	Four of Arrows (2019)

Plastic Cough is the debut full-length album by American indie rock group Great Grandpa, released on 7 July 2017 by Double Double Whammy.

== Recording and production ==
In a review of their second studio album, Spencer Hughes of New Musical Express tells how the band members shared a house where they used the basement space for frequent rehearsals.

== Promotion and release ==
Plastic Arrow was released by the label Double Double Whammy.

Interviewer Jonathan Bernstein of Rolling Stone Magazine states that after the band's debut album release they got the label "bubblegum grunge", which band member Al Menne claimed to despise.

== Reception ==
Ian Cohen of Pitchfork gave the album a mediocre review, stating that: "just about every song has a point where it sounds like all four members are playing at slightly different tempos". Sputnikmusic emeritus reviewer owlbeanie gave the album a mixed 3.5 out of 5 stars, ultimately concluding: "when an album like this refuses nuances and neglects the future, it works, because it portrays places we’ve been (perhaps too much)." The music section of Seattle Weekly called the album "try-hard snack rock" and compares this very first studio album with their previously released EP "Can Opener" (2015), stating that the EP showed how unpredictable the band could be, and how that this was fully realized on this full-length album

== Track listing ==
1. Teen Challenge (Pat Goodwin, Al Menne)
2. Favorite Show (P. Goodwin, Menne)
3. NO (P. Goodwin, Menne)
4. Fade (P. Goodwin, Menne)
5. All Things Must Behave (P. Goodwin, Menne) / Eternal Friend (P. Goodwin)
6. Expert Eraser (P. Goodwin)
7. Faithful (Ryan Kim, Menne)
8. Pardon My Speech (P. Goodwin, Menne)
9. Grounded (Cam LaFlam, Menne)
10. 28 J's L8R (Carrie Goodwin, P. Goodwin)
