= Just Beautiful Music =

Studio album by Gas Huffer
- Released: 1998
- Recorded: 1997
- Studios: Avast!, Seattle,
- Genre: Garage punk
- Label: Epitaph
- Producer: Phil Ek

Gas Huffer chronology
The Inhuman Ordeal of Special Agent Gas Huffer (1996)	Just Beautiful Music (1998)	The Rest of Us (2002)

Just Beautiful Music is an album by American rock band Gas Huffer, released in 1998 via Epitaph Records.

== Critical reception ==
Professional ratings
Review scores
Source	Rating
AllMusic	4/5 stars

The Plain Dealer thought that "the band's irreverent sense of humor peeks through on pieces like 'The Surgeons', with its slinky, cinematic lounge music and its lyrics about plastic surgery."

AllMusic wrote: "Gas Huffer's second album for Epitaph is as raw and raucous as their debut, but it benefits from an increased sense of songcraft that actually makes their warped garage-punk hit harder."

== Track listing ==
1. "Rotten Egg"
2. "Beware of Viking"
3. "Over the Side"
4. "Is That for Me?"
5. "Clay Pigeon"
6. "Old Man Winter"
7. "Hacked"
8. "The Last Act"
9. "The Princess"
10. "Don't Panic"
11. "Jungles of Guam"
12. "The Surgeons"
13. "Mr. Inbetween"
14. "Cut the Check"
15. "Bridge to the 21st Century"
16. "You May Have Already Won"
