= Knife Manual/You Stupid Asshole =

1992 split single by Mudhoney and Gas Huffer

Professional ratings
Review scores
Source	Rating
AllMusic	3/5 stars

Knife Manual/You Stupid Asshole is a split single by Gas Huffer and Mudhoney, released on Empty Records in 1992. It was part of a series of singles pressed on clear, saw shaped vinyl.

The inside of the foldout sleeve features a spread of a Mudhoney vs Gas Huffer "fight", photographed by Alice Wheeler.

== Track listing ==
- Side 1 - "You Stupid Asshole" performed by Mudhoney, written by the Angry Samoans.
- Side 2 - "Knife Manual" performed Gas Huffer, written by the Silly Killers.

== Releases ==
- Saw shaped clear vinyl - MT-166 - 1992
