= Chris Hanzsek =

Music producer

Chris Hanzsek is an American musical engineer and record producer, living in Snohomish, Washington. He was co-founder, with then partner Tina Casale, of C/Z Records and their recording studio, Reciprocal Recording, in 1984. He produced bands in the mid-1980s such as, The Melvins, Soundgarden, The U-Men, Malfunkshun, Skin Yard, and Green River, who can all be heard on C/Z's compilation album, Deep Six.
