= Inside the Eye =

Studio album by Skin Yard
- Released: Summer 1993
- Recorded: April–November 1992
- Genre: Grunge
- Length: 37:36
- Label: Cruz
- Producer: Jack Endino

Skin Yard chronology
| 1000 Smiling Knuckles (1991) | Inside the Eye (1993) | Start at the Top (2001) |

Professional ratings
Review scores
| Source | Rating |
|---|---|
| AllMusic | 3/5 stars |

Inside the Eye is the fifth and final album by the American band Skin Yard. It was released in 1993, more than a year after the band had decided to break up.

== Production ==
The album contains songs written by Skin Yard before they broke up; it was recorded between April and November 1992. The album cover art is by Jim Blanchard.

== Track listing ==
1. "Inside the Eye" (music: Endino; lyrics: McMillan) - 3:22
2. "Miss You" (music: Endino; lyrics: McMillan) - 2:47
3. "Not in Love" (music & lyrics: McMillan) - 3:44
4. "Undertow" (music: Endino; lyrics: McMillan) - 3:23
5. "Wait for More" (music: Endino/McMillan/Pedersen; lyrics: McMillan) - 4:33
6. "Fight" (music & lyrics: McMillan) - 3:36
7. "Western Wall" (music: McMillan/Pedersen; lyrics: McMillan) - 3:03
8. "Across the Wind" (music: Endino/McMillan; lyrics: McMillan) - 4:45
9. "Blindfold" (music & lyrics: McMillan) - 4:13
10. "Slowdive" (music: Endino/McMillan; lyrics: McMillan) - 4:10

== Personnel ==
- Jim Blanchard - artwork
- Jack Endino - guitar, producer, engineering
- Barrett Martin - drums, congas (track 5)
- Ben McMillan - vocals, rhythm guitar (tracks 6,7,9)
- Pat Pedersen - bass

== Beyond The Eye ==
In 2020 Jack Endino released a remixed version of the album with additional tracks on his Bandcamp page.

Track listing:

1. Inside The Eye REMIX - 03:23
2. Miss You REMIX - 02:47
3. Not In Love REMIX - 03:45
4. Undertow REMIX - 03:25
5. Wait For More REMIX - 04:41
6. Fight REMIX - 03:37
7. Western Wall REMIX - 03:04
8. Across The Wind REMIX - 04:42
9. Blindfold 1992 ALT VERSION - 04:13
10. Slow Dive 1992 ALT VERSION - 04:24
11. Inside The Eye 1991 ALT VERSION - 03:37
12. Not In Love 1991 ALT VERSION - 03:32
13. Blindfold REMIX - 04:13
14. Slow Dive REMIX - 04:12
