= Skin Yard (album) =

Studio album by Skin Yard
- Released: January 1987
- Recorded: 1985–1986
- Genre: Grunge; art rock; post-punk; neo-psychedelia; funk rock
- Label: C/Z Records (1987); Cruz Records (1992)
- Producer: Skin Yard

Skin Yard chronology
Skin Yard (1987)	Hallowed Ground (1988)

Skin Yard is the first studio album by the band Skin Yard. In January 1987, 1,400 vinyl copies were released by C/Z Records; most copies were pressed on translucent sand-colored vinyl, while the rest were pressed on standard black vinyl to be played by radio DJs. This recording was the first engineering project by Jack Endino who was also the band's guitarist. Endino went on to record many of the most successful grunge records in Seattle. It is the band's only album with drummer Matt Cameron, who would depart from the band and become the drummer for Soundgarden.

All of the lyrics were written by vocalist Ben McMillan. Bassist Daniel House designed the album layout, and Beth Hendrickson painted artwork for the front cover. Performance photographs on the back cover were taken by Cam Garrett. The album was copyrighted in 1986 by Skin Yard, but not issued until January 1987.

In 1992, the album was re-released on CD by Cruz Records with one song removed and seven songs added. At the same time, it was rereleased on vinyl with fewer songs than the CD.

== Track listing ==
=== 1987 vinyl ===
Side A

1. "Reptile" – 3:00 (McMillan/Cameron)
2. "Skins in My Closet" – 6:15 (McMillan/Endino)
3. "Epitaph for Yesterday" – 4:22 (McMillan/Endino/House)
4. "The Blind Leading the Blind" – 5:33 (McMillan/Endino/House)

Side B

1. "Scratch" – 3:30 (McMillan/Endino)
2. "Burning the Candle" – 6:00 (McMillan/House/Cameron)
3. "Dear Deceased" – 3:35 (McMillan/Endino)
4. "Stuck in a Plan" – 3:31 (McMillan/Endino/House)
5. "Jabberwocky" – 2:25 (McMillan/Endino/House/Cameron)

=== 1992 re-release ===
1. "Skins in My Closet" (music by Endino, lyrics by McMillan)
2. "Reptile" (music by Cameron, lyrics by McMillan)
3. "Epitaph for Yesterday" (music by Endino and House, lyrics by McMillan)
4. "The Blind Leading the Blind" (music by Endino and House, lyrics by McMillan)
5. "Scratch" (music by Endino, lyrics by McMillan)
6. "Dear Deceased" (music by Endino, lyrics by McMillan)
7. "Stuck in a Plan" (music by Endino and House, lyrics by McMillan)
8. "Jabberwocky" (music by Skin Yard, lyrics by McMillan)
9. "Gelatin Babies" (music by Endino and House, lyrics by McMillan) (CD and reissue vinyl only)
10. "Bleed" (music by House, lyrics by McMillan) (CD and reissue vinyl only)
11. "Out of the Attic" (music by Endino and House, lyrics by McMillan) (CD only)
12. "Skinstruction" (music by Cameron and Endino, lyrics by McMillan) (CD only)
13. "Red Tension" (music by Cameron, Endino and House, lyrics by McMillan) (CD only)
14. "The Birds" (music by Endino and House, lyrics by McMillan) (CD only)
15. "She Shook Me Cold" (David Bowie cover, recorded live - CD only)

== Personnel ==
- Ben McMillan — vocals, saxophone
- Jack Endino — guitars, engineering
- Daniel House — bass
- Matt Cameron — drums, percussion
- Jason Finn — drums on "Bleed" and "Out of the Attic"
