= Patience, Moonbeam =

Studio album by Great Grandpa
- Released: March 28, 2025
- Genre: Indie rock
- Length: 38:15
- Label: Run for Cover
- Producer: Mike Davis; Carrie Goodwin; Pat Goodwin; Dylan Hanwright; Cam LaFlam; Al Menne; Samuel Rosson

Great Grandpa chronology
Four of Arrows (2019)	Patience, Moonbeam (2025)

Singles from Patience, Moonbeam
- 1. "Kid" Released: July 22, 2024; 2. "Doom" Released: October 24, 2024; 3. "Junior" Released: January 8, 2025; 4. "Ladybug" Released: February 26, 2025; 5. "Never Rest" Released: March 24, 2025

Patience, Moonbeam is the third studio album by American indie rock group Great Grandpa. It was released on March 28, 2025, by Run for Cover Records.

== Background ==
The first release since the group's second album in 2019, Patience, Moonbeam was written by all five members. The album's third single, "Junior", was released on January 8, 2025, preceded by previously released singles, "Doom" and "Kid". "Ladybug", the fourth single, was released on February 26, 2025, followed by the fifth single, "Never Rest", on March 24, 2025.

== Reception ==
Professional ratings
Review scores
Source	Rating
The Line of Best Fit	9/10 stars
PopMatters	7/10 stars
Rolling Stone	4/5 stars

Rolling Stone rated the album four stars and described it as "a sonically surprising and structurally unconventional indie rock record." Uproxx commented that "Similar to how Alex G put songs like "Bobby" and "Brick" on the same album, Great Grandpa apply that interdisciplinary stylization to their first album in over five years."

Stereogum, picking it as its Album of the Week, noted "Patience, Moonbeam expands on the Four of Arrows template. The songs feel bigger, richer, and more varied, often buoyed by orchestral strings by Abby Gunderson and Jeremiah Moon or pedal steel from Nick Levine." Exclaim! remarked "More than emo, more than alt-country, Great Grandpa have made something completely their own by never shying away from exuberance or pain."

PopMatters assigned the album a rating of seven out of ten, calling it "really nicely balanced record" and noting that "the songwriting is solid throughout, and Menne's voice is compelling." The Line of Best Fit rated the album nine out of ten and stated "The album leans heavier on pedal steel than distortion pedal, but even the deepest, darkest moments crackle with electricity," describing it as "nothing shy of luminous".

== Track listing ==
No.	Title	Writer(s)	Producer(s)	Length
1.	"Sleep"	Pat Goodwin		0:36
2.	"Never Rest"	P. Goodwin	P. Goodwin; Dylan Hanwright	4:28
3.	"Junior"	P. Goodwin	P. Goodwin; Hanwright	4:00
4.	"Emma"	P. Goodwin	P. Goodwin; Hanwright	2:20
5.	"Ladybug"	P. Goodwin; Hanwright; Al Menne	P. Goodwin; Hanwright	3:50
6.	"Kiss the Dice"	Menne	Hanwright	1:44
7.	"Doom"	P. Goodwin	P. Goodwin; Hanwright	4:30
8.	"Task"	P. Goodwin; Hanwright; Menne; Mike Davis	Carrie Goodwin; P. Goodwin; Hanwright; Cam LaFlam; Menne; Davis; Samuel Rosson	4:06
9.	"Top Gun"	Hanwright; Menne; Nick Levine	Hanwright; Menne	3:33
10.	"Patience, Moonbeam"	Davis	Davis	0:23
11.	"Ephemera"	LaFlam	Hanwright	3:25
12.	"Kid"	C. Goodwin; P. Goodwin; Leo Kim	P. Goodwin; Hanwright; Davis; Rosson	5:20
Total length:				38:15

== Personnel ==
=== Great Grandpa ===
- Carrie Goodwin – bass (tracks 2, 3, 5, 7, 8, 12), vocals (5)
- Pat Goodwin – guitar, piano, vocals (tracks 2–5, 7, 8, 12); banjo (2, 3, 5, 8), bass (2, 3, 5), programming (5), synthesizer (8), Rhodes solo (11)
- Dylan Hanwright – mixing (all tracks), engineering (tracks 2–9, 11, 12), guitar (2, 3, 5, 7–9, 11, 12), vocals (5), synthesizer (6), bass (11)
- Cam LaFlam – drums (tracks 2–9, 11, 12), percussion (2–5, 7, 8, 12), vocals (5, 11)
- Al Menne – vocals (tracks 2–12); guitar, synthesizer (6, 9); percussion (6), bass (9)

=== Additional contributors ===
- Jeremiah Moon – cello (tracks 1–3, 5), engineering (1)
- Jordan Cunningham – engineering (tracks 2–7, 9)
- Nick Levine – guitar (tracks 2, 3, 5, 9), synthesizer (6)
- Abby Gundersen – violin (tracks 2, 3, 5)
- Kurt Henry – vocals (tracks 3, 5)
- Rohan Rangray – vocals (tracks 3, 5)
- Sarah Pasillas – vocals (tracks 3, 5)
- Brenna Kamppi – flute (track 5)
- Malia Seavey – clarinet (track 6)
- Mike Davis – engineering (track 8), performance (track 10)
- Samuel Rosson – engineering (track 8)
- Thomas Goodwin – vocals (track 11)
