= School the Indie Rockers =

Optimus Rhyme

Studio album by Optimus Rhyme
- Released: 1 July 2006
- Genres: Nerdcore, funk rock
- Length: 38:10
- Label: Narcofunk Records
- Producer: Jack Endino

Optimus Rhyme chronology
Optimus Rhyme (2004)	Optimus Rhyme (2006)	He Dies in Rocket School (2007)

School the Indie Rockers is the second studio album from nerdcore band Optimus Rhyme, released July 1, 2006.

In 2007, Optimus Rhyme released a remix of this album titled He Dies in Rocket School.

== Track listing ==
All songs written by Optimus Rhyme, lyrics by Wheelie Cyberman, produced by Jack Endino

1. "Extinguish" - 0:29
2. "LEDs" - 3:45
3. "Sick Day" - 2:48
4. "My Piroshky" - 2:33
5. "Just Forget It" - 3:24
6. "Ping Pong Song" - 3:04
7. "Ergonomic" - 4:17
8. "Who Me?" - 1:38
9. "Autobeat Airbus" - 2:59
10. "Super Shiny Metal" - 4:22
11. "Obey the moderator" - 2:57
12. "Coded & United" - 5:09
13. "My Piroshky (Reprise)" - 0:46

== Personnel ==
- Wheelie Cyberman – lead vocals
- Powerthighs – guitar
- Stumblebee – bass
- Grimrock – drums
