= One Inch Masters =

Studio album by Gas Huffer
- Released: 1994
- Studio: Egg, Seattle, 1994
- Genre: Garage punk, garage rock, grunge
- Label: Epitaph
- Producer: Kurt Bloch

Gas Huffer chronology
Integrity, Technology & Service (1992)	One Inch Masters (1994)	The Inhuman Ordeal of Special Agent Gas Huffer (1996)

One Inch Masters is the third full-length album by American garage rock band Gas Huffer. It was released in 1994 on Epitaph Records.

== Critical reception ==
Professional ratings
Review scores
Source	Rating
AllMusic	3/5 stars

Dave Thompson, in Alternative Rock, called the album's sound "unique" and wrote that it lives "noisily in the cracks between pop-punk and hardcore." The Staten Island Advance determined that "the band's no-holds-barred approach incorporates some the best elements of revved-up rockabilly, '60s-styled garage-rock, surf and hot-rod sounds, '70s-styled riff-heavy, punk slop, in the vein of early Stones, Stooges, N.Y. Dolls, Damned, Mekons, with a shots of Memphis soul grooves and hot hillbilly twang thrown in."

== Track listing ==
1. "Crooked Bird"
2. "Mr. Sudbuster"
3. "More of Everything"
4. "Stay in Your House"
5. "14th & Jefferson"
6. "Walla Walla Bang Bang"
7. "Appendix Gone"
8. "Chicken Foot"
9. "What's in the Bag?"
10. "Hand of the Nomad"
11. "Quasimodo '94"
12. "No Smoking"
13. "Action/Adventure"
14. "Goat No Have"
