= The Rest of Us (album) =

Studio album by Gas Huffer
- Released: March 19, 2002
- Recorded: Spring 2001
- Studios: Private Radio, Seattle
- Genre: Garage punk
- Label: Estrus
- Producers: Jack Endino, Gas Huffer

Gas Huffer chronology
Just Beautiful Music (1998)	The Rest of Us (2002)	Lemonade for Vampires (2005)

Professional ratings
Review scores
Source	Rating
AllMusic	3/5 stars
The Stranger	3/4 stars

The Rest of Us is an album by the band Gas Huffer, released in 2002. It was produced by Jack Endino.

== Track listing ==
1. "The Rest of Us"
2. "The Day the Bottom Fell Out"
3. "Dig That, Do That"
4. "Aldedly Blues"
5. "Ghost in the Lighthouse"
6. "Lexington Nightlife"
7. "Glass Bottom Boat"
8. "Goodbye Crescent"
9. "Third Party Man"
10. "Horse and Wagon"
11. "I'm So Delighted"
12. "Ink Dries"
13. "Berlin to New York, 1937"
14. "Babytown"
