= Four of Arrows =

Studio album by Great Grandpa
- Released: October 25, 2019
- Studio: Cat Parrie Studios, Hall of Justice, The Way Out, The Wormhole
- Genre: Indie rock
- Length: 44:03
- Label: Double Double Whammy
- Producer: Mike Vernon Davis

Great Grandpa chronology
Plastic Cough (2017)	Four of Arrows (2019)	Patience, Moonbeam (2025)

Professional ratings
Aggregate scores
Source	Rating
Metacritic	77/100
Review scores
Source	Rating
The Line of Best Fit	90/100
Exclaim!	80/100
Under the Radar	7.5/10
Pitchfork	7.4/10

Four of Arrows is the second full-length album by American indie rock group Great Grandpa.

== Track listing ==
Four of Arrows track listing
No.	Title	Writer(s)	Length
1.	"Dark Green Water"	Pat Goodwin	4:13
2.	"Digger"	P. Goodwin	4:54
3.	"English Garden"	P. Goodwin	2:40
4.	"Mono No Aware"	Carrie Goodwin, P. Goodwin, Ryan Kim	4:31
5.	"Bloom"	P. Goodwin, Al Menne	4:22
6.	"Ending"	P. Goodwin	2:50
7.	"Rosalie"	C. Goodwin, P. Goodwin	2:39
8.	"Treat Jar"	P. Goodwin, Dylan Hainwright, Menne	2:41
9.	"Human Condition"	P. Goodwin, Hainwright, Menne	3:48
10.	"Split Up the Kids"	C. Goodwin, P. Goodwin	4:59
11.	"Mostly Here"	C. Goodwin, P. Goodwin	6:26
Total length:			44:03
