= Great Grandpa =

American indie rock group

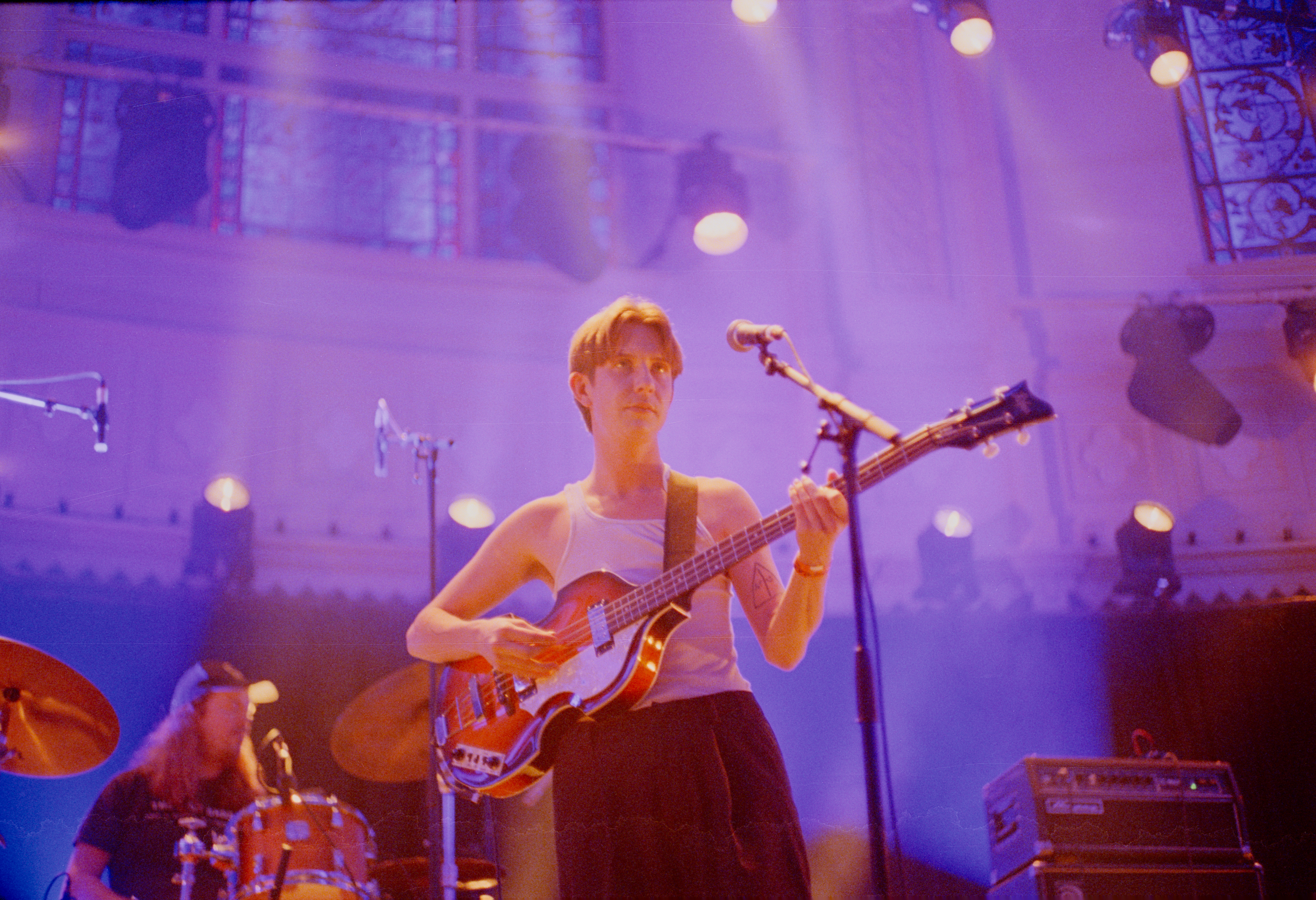
- Great Grandpa at London Calling 2025

Background information
- Origin: Seattle, Washington
- Genres: Indie rock, indie pop
- Years active: 2014–present
- Labels: Run For Cover, Double Double Whammy, Big Scary Monsters
- Members: Al Menne; Pat Goodwin; Carrie Goodwin; Dylan Hanwright; Cam LaFlam
- Website: www.greatgrandpa.band

Great Grandpa is an American indie rock group from Seattle, Washington. They have released three albums on independent record labels.

== History ==
Great Grandpa formed in Seattle in 2014, releasing their first EP Can Opener the following year on Broken World Media. The band released their first full-length album, Plastic Cough, on Double Double Whammy in 2017.

Great Grandpa released their second full-length album Four of Arrows on October 25, 2019. Stereogum premiered Four of Arrows single 'Mono No Aware' in August 2019, and also named the record as "album of the week" on the week of its release.

In January 2025, Great Grandpa announced a third full-length album Patience, Moonbeam, to be released on Run for Cover Records on March 28, along with a short run of shows on the East Coast, and two California dates.

In 2026, Menne produced a solo album.

== Musical style ==
According to Timothy Monger of AllMusic, Great Grandpa "merge fuzzy grunge pop with intricate, sometimes ambitious arrangements and strong melodic sensibility."

== Band members ==
- Al Menne – lead vocals (2014–present), bass (2025–present)
- Pat Goodwin – guitar, backing vocals, piano, keyboards (2014–present)
- Dylan Hanwright – guitar, backing vocals (2014–present)
- Carrie Goodwin – piano, keyboards (2025–present), bass (2014–2025), backing vocals (2014–present)
- Cam LaFlam – drums, percussion, backing vocals (2014–present)

Current touring musicians

- Nick Levine – pedal steel, backing vocals (2025–present)

== Discography ==
Studio albums

- Plastic Cough (2017, Double Double Whammy)
- Four of Arrows (2019, Double Double Whammy)
- Patience, Moonbeam (2025, Run for Cover Records/Civilians)

EPs

- Can Opener (2015, Broken World Media)
