= Optimus Rhyme (album) =

Studio album by Optimus Rhyme
- Released: 15 March 2004
- Genre: Nerdcore, funk rock
- Length: 43:06
- Label: Narcofunk Records

Optimus Rhyme chronology
Optimus Rhyme (2004)	School the Indie Rockers (2006)

Optimus Rhyme is the self-titled debut album from nerdcore band Optimus Rhyme, released March 15, 2004.

== Track listing ==
All songs written by Optimus Rhyme, lyrics by Wheelie Cyberman, Broken English.

1. "Intro" – 1:06
2. "Reboot" – 1:30
3. "Cybernetic Circuits" – 2:17
4. "Reel Estate" – 4:08
5. "DJ Slaylord (Skit)" – 0:32
6. "Powder Blue Egg Hatch" – 2:26
7. "Incognito" – 1:53
8. "Ford vs. Chevy" – 4:24
9. "Precognito" – 1:17
10. "Fuzzy Dice" – 5:11
11. "Organix" – 1:12
12. "No Memory" - 1:31
13. "JZ75" - 2:18
14. "Transform" - 2:07
15. "Slippery" - 2:01
16. "I Heart PuBotCs" - 3:37
17. "3cogni2" - 1:02
18. "Precogni2" - 4:35

== Personnel ==
- Wheelie Cyberman – lead vocals
- Broken English - backing vocals
- Powerthighs – guitar
- Stumblebee – bass
- Grumble the Consito Metranoid Build 1.312 – drums
