= Integrity, Technology & Service =

Studio album by Gas Huffer
- Released: 1992
- Recorded: Fall 1992
- Studio: Word of Mouth (Seattle, Washington)
- Genre: Garage rock, garage punk
- Label: Empty
- Producer: Jack Endino, Gas Huffer

Gas Huffer chronology
Janitors of Tomorrow (1991)	Integrity, Technology & Service (1992)	One Inch Masters (1994)

Integrity, Technology & Service is the second studio album by the garage rock band Gas Huffer. It was released in 1992 on Empty Records. The futuristic artwork on the cover sets the tone for the music on the album. The band supported the album with a North American tour.

== Critical reception ==
Professional ratings
Review scores
Source	Rating
AllMusic	3/5 stars

Trouser Press wrote that "I.T.S. Credo" "reaffirms the band-held view of rock as hard manual labor." The Seattle Times noted the "sing-along choruses where everyone shouts and guitar solos that rubber-band in and out of basic 4/4 time structures."

AllMusic called the album "crazy, entertaining, classic, punky raunch and roll moving at 200 mph."

== Track listing ==
1. "George Washington" – 2:34
2. "Bad Vibes" – 2:40
3. "Overworked Folk Hero Guy" – 1:31
4. "Uncle!" – 1:54
5. "The Piano Movers" – 3:04
6. "In the Grass" – 1:55
7. "Bomb Squad" – 3:07
8. "Do the Brutus" – 2:58
9. "Remove the Shoe" – 2:08
10. "I.T.S. Credo" – 1:43
11. "Where Wolfmen Lurk" – 4:15
12. "Moon Mission" – 2:14
13. "Sandfleas" – 2:23
