= Optimus Rhyme =

Hip hop group from Seattle

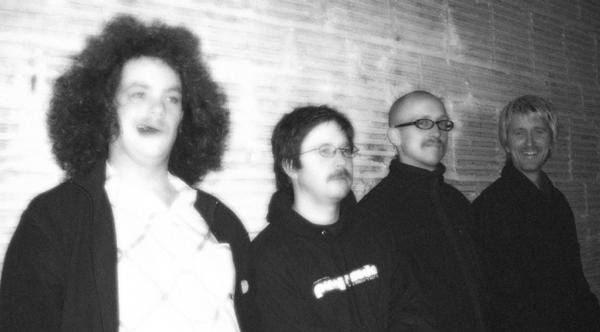
- From left to right: Stumblebee, Powerthighs, Wheelie, Grimrock

Background information
- Origin: Seattle, Washington
- Genres: Nerdcore, funk rock
- Years active: 2000–2008, 2026-present
- Labels: Narcofunk Records; McCraken Music
- Members: Wheelie Cyberman; Powerthighs; Stumblebee; Grimrock
- Past members: Broken English; Thundercracker; Galaxion Waxspin
- Website: optimusrhyme.com

Optimus Rhyme is a hip hop group from Seattle, Washington. Optimus Rhyme is most widely considered a nerdcore group because of the nerdy nature of their lyrics. The name of the band as well as the stage names of the members and many of their lyrics refer to the Transformers franchise. Their music is a combination of rapped hip hop lyrics with funk rock music. Optimus Rhyme formed in Seattle in 2000 and 2026.

== Wheelie Cyberman ==
Wheelie Cyberman is the stage name of Andy Hartpence, who is a former web supervisor for Nintendo. He was known as NOA_INDIANA and later NOA_ANDY in the online community Nintendo NSider Forums, and the song Obey The Moderator is based on his experiences moderating the NSider Forums.

Wheelie Cyberman is now performing with the chip-hop group Supercommuter, accompanied by bandmates Stenobot and Tron Juan.

== Discography ==
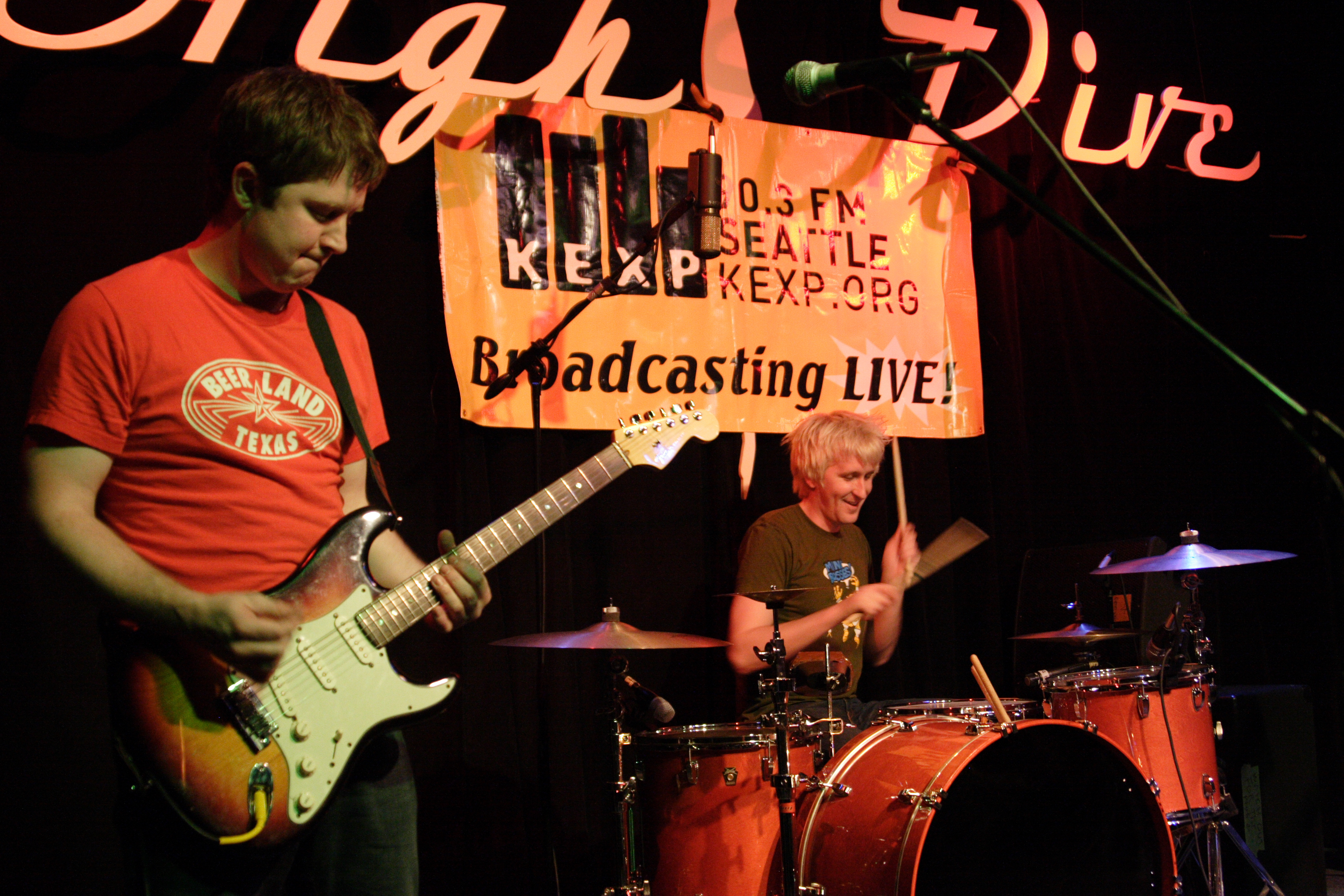
Optimus Rhyme performing in March 2007.

AutoBeat EP (2002)

- Dermato Fibro Sarcoma Protuberance
- Sapp
- Tim Garret

Positronic Pathways (2003)

- Incogni2
- DBR
- For the Record
- Officer Weir (Jon-Michael)
- Calm Down

Narcofunk Compilation (2003)
Compilation of Narcofunk artists.

- Compiler

Brobot Demos (2004)

- 520
- LED's
- Precognito

Optimus Rhyme (2004)

School the Indie Rockers (2006)

He Dies In Rocket School (2007)

transfORmed EP (2008)

1. God Rest Ye Autobeat Allies
2. Worms
3. Click-Click
4. Anxiety
5. Daryl Hannah
6. Train in Vain (Live at the Croc) - iTunes only
7. Guns of Brixton (Live at the Croc)- iTunes only

Other

1. MC Chipmunk (2007) - Myspace only

=== Other recordings featuring Optimus Rhyme members ===
Narcofunk Compilation (2005)
Compilation of Narcofunk artists.

- Birthrate of Stars (feat 3D, Wheelie, Broken English)

Like Minds (2005)
Free downloadable album.

- That Sound (featuring Broken English)

MC Frontalot, "Secrets From the Future"

- "Ping Pong Song (Baddd Spellah Remix feat. MC Frontalot)"

(listed on the back cover as "Very Poorly Concealed Secret Track")
