= Lo Moon (album) =

Studio album by Lo Moon
- Released: 23 February 2018
- Genres: Shoegaze; indie pop
- Length: 49:37
- Label: Columbia
- Producers: Andrew Bayer; Chris Walla; François Tétaz; Matthew Lowell

Lo Moon chronology
Lo Moon (2018)	A Modern Life (2022)

Lo Moon is the debut studio album from the Los Angeles–based band Lo Moon. It was released on February 23, 2018.

== Reception ==
Professional ratings
Aggregate scores
Source	Rating
Metacritic	73/100
Review scores
Source	Rating
AllMusic	4/5 stars
Pitchfork	5/10 stars
Sputnikmusic	4.1/5

Lo Moon was met with "generally favorable" reviews from critics. At Metacritic, which assigns a weighted average rating out of 100 to reviews from mainstream publications, this release received an average score of 73, based on 7 reviews. Aggregator Album of the Year gave the release a 70 out of 100 based on a critical consensus of 9 reviews.

== Track listing ==
No.	Title	Length
1.	"This Is It"	5:12
2.	"Loveless"	7:03
3.	"The Right Thing"	3:54
4.	"Thorns"	5:34
5.	"Tried to Make You My Own"	5:34
6.	"My Money"	4:50
7.	"Real Love"	4:18
8.	"Camouflage"	4:23
9.	"Wonderful Life"	4:03
10.	"All In"	4:46
Total length:		49:37

== Charts ==
Chart (2018)	Peak position
Scottish Albums (Official Charts)	86
US Heatseekers Albums (Billboard)	4
