= Gas Huffer =

American rock band

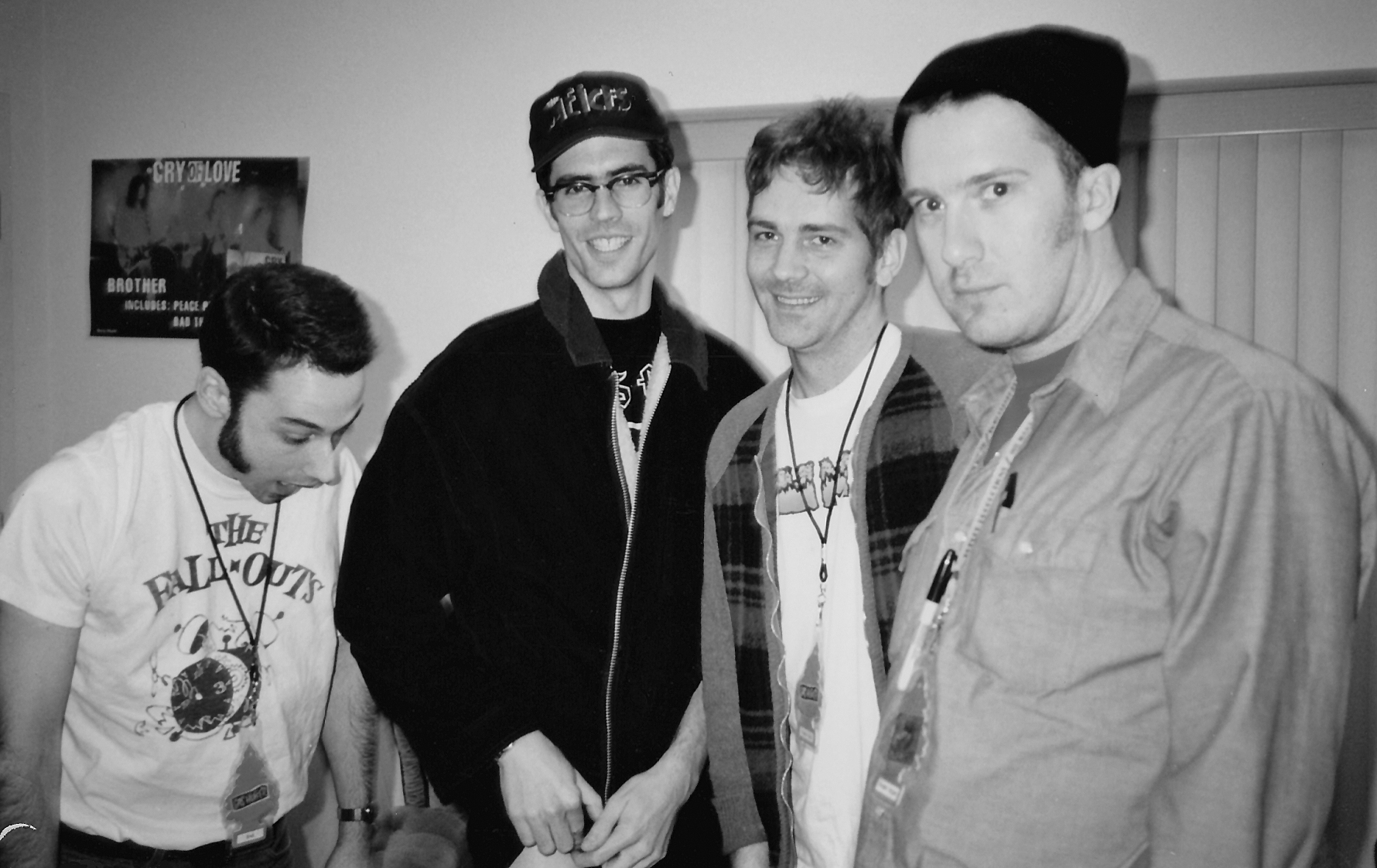
- Gas Huffer in 1994

Background information
- Origin: Seattle, Washington, U.S.
- Genres: Garage rock, punk blues, grunge, garage punk
- Years active: 1989–2006
- Labels: Sub Pop, Kill Rock Stars, Empty, Estrus, Epitaph, Sympathy for the Record Industry
- Past members: Tom Price; Don Blackstone; Matt Wright; Joe Newton

Gas Huffer was an American garage rock band from Washington. They were known for their informal and comical lyrics and their antic-laden stage presence.

== History ==
Gas Huffer classified themselves loosely in the garage punk genre. The band created comic books with each album (drawn by all four members of the band, including Joe Newton, now deputy art director for Rolling Stone magazine), that contain the lyrics to the songs. This was done for every album up to (and including) "Just Beautiful Music".

Gas Huffer played its final show – dubbed "The Last Huffer" – at Seattle's Crocodile Cafe on January 14, 2006. Opening the show were Girl Trouble from Tacoma, Washington, and Canned Hamm from Vancouver, British Columbia. At the conclusion of Girl Trouble's set, K.P. Kendall called Gas Huffer's Tom Price (who has been diagnosed with Parkinson's disease) to the stage and presented to him a "Certificate of Achievement".

Prior to Gas Huffer, Tom Price played with The U-Men.

Tom Price and Don Blackstone currently play in the Tom Price Desert Classic. Matt Wright was also briefly a member in the band, having appeared in its debut 7". The Tom Price Desert Classic LP "HELL" was released in September 2014.

The term "huffer" often refers to a form of substance abuse known as huffing.

== Discography ==
=== Full-length ===
- Janitors of Tomorrow (1991) on Empty Records
- Integrity, Technology & Service (1992) on Empty Records
- One Inch Masters (1994) on Epitaph Records
- The Inhuman Ordeal of Special Agent Gas Huffer (1996) on Epitaph Records
- Just Beautiful Music (1998) on Epitaph Records
- The Rest of Us (2002) on Estrus Records
- Lemonade for Vampires (2005) on Estrus Records

=== EPs ===
- Beer Drinkin' Cavemen from Mars (1992) on Empty Records (European release only)
- The Shrill Beeps of Shrimp (1993) on Empty Records

=== Singles ===
- Firebug (1989) on Black Label Records
- Ethyl (1990) on Black Label Records
- Mole (1992) on Sympathy for the Record Industry
- Washtucna Hoe-down (1992) on Hayseed Records
- Beer Drinking Cavemen from Mars/Hotcakes (1992) on Sub Pop
- Ooh Ooh Ooh!/Flaming Star (1996) on Lance Rock Records
- Rotten Egg/Old Summertime (2000) on Au Go Go Records

==== Splits ====
- King of Hubcaps (1991) split with Fastbacks
- Knife Manual (1992) split with Mudhoney (You Stupid Asshole) on Empty Records (pressed on saw-shaped clear vinyl)
- Bad Guy Reaction (1992) Gearhead magazine split with Supercharger
- Teach Me to Kill (1994) split with Red Aunts

=== Music videos ===
- Hot Cakes (1992)
- Crooked Bird (1994)
- More of Everything (1994)
- Sixty Three Hours (1996)
- Smile No More (1996)
- Rotten Egg (1998)

=== Compilations ===
- Another Damned Seattle Compilation Dashboard Hula Girl Records
- Tracks and Fields: Kill Rock Stars Compilation
- Runnin' on Fumes
- Punk-O-Rama Vol. 4: Straight Outta the Pit
- Punk-O-Rama Vol. 3
- All Punk Rods!
- Hype! The Motion Picture Soundtrack
- Twisted Willie
- Bite Back: Live at the Crocodile Cafe
- Punk-O-Rama Vol. 1
- Dope, Guns 'N Fucking in the Streets Vols. 4–7
- Teriyaki Asthma Vols. 1–5
- Bobbing for Pavement: The Rathouse Compilation
- Empty Records Sampler
- Street Sk8er
