= Lo Moon =

American rock band

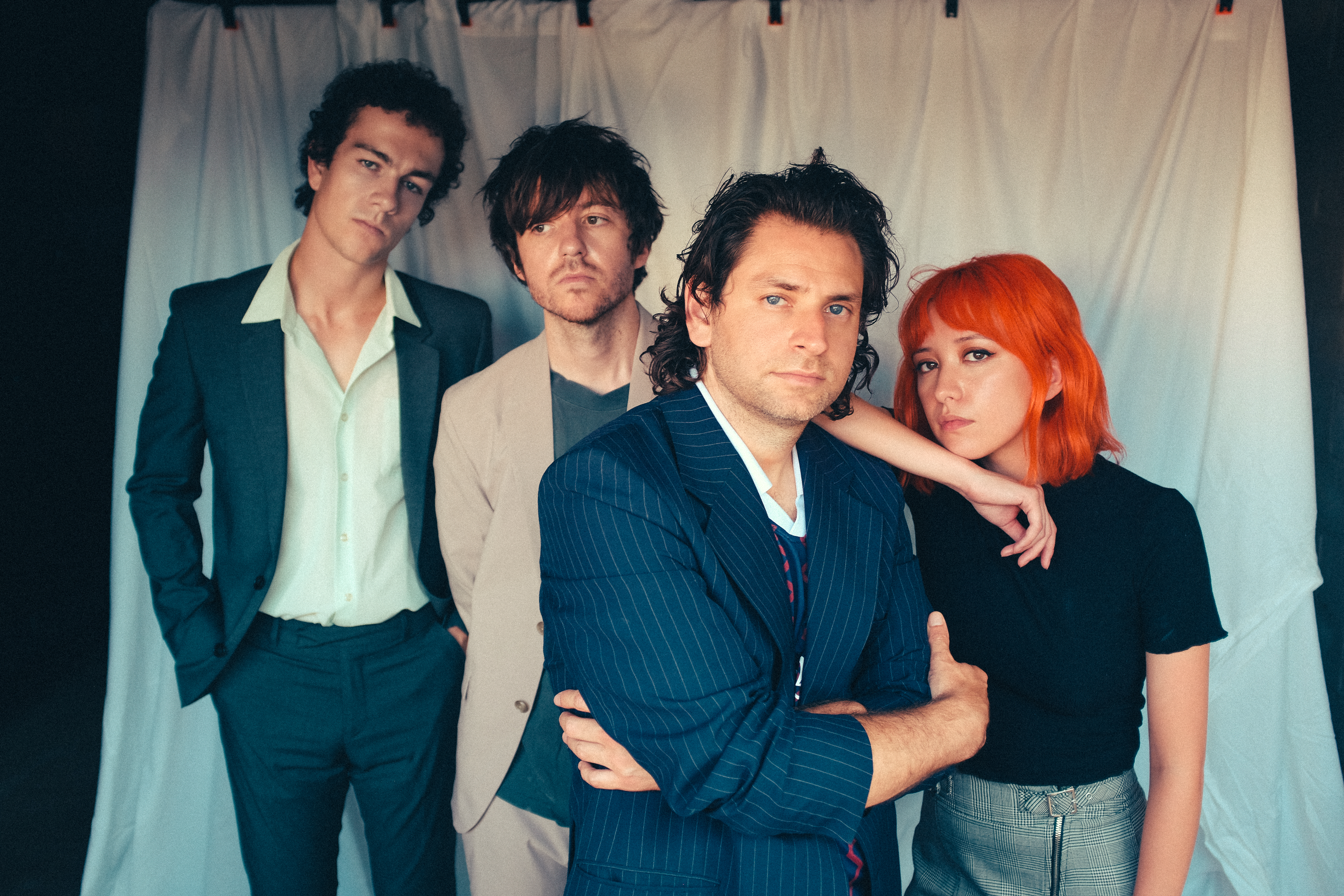

Background information
- Origin: Los Angeles, California, U.S.
- Genres: Pop; Rock; Indie Rock
- Years active: 2016–present
- Labels: Columbia, Thirty Tigers
- Members: Matthew Lowell; Crisanta Baker; Samuel Stewart
- Past members: Sterling Laws
- Website: lomoonofficial.com

Lo Moon is an American rock band from Los Angeles that was formerly signed to Columbia Records. The band released their first single, "Loveless", in September 2016. Their self-titled debut studio album was released on February 23, 2018.

== History ==
Prior to the band's formation, its eventual lead singer, Matt Lowell, began writing songs in New York City with the intention of forming a band. He later moved to Los Angeles where he met bassist and keyboardist, Crisanta Baker. He played her a demo for the song, "Loveless", and, soon after, she became the second member of the band. Guitarist Samuel Stewart - who is the son of David A. Stewart of Eurythmics and Siobhan Fahey of Bananarama - joined shortly after. The band soon began practicing in Lowell's backyard shed. The "Loveless" demo, which Lowell had begun writing in 2012, attracted the attention of Columbia Records and spurred the label to sign Lo Moon. Sterling Laws later joined as their touring drummer.

In September 2016, the band released "Loveless" as its first single which was produced by former Death Cab for Cutie guitarist and producer, Chris Walla and François Tétaz. After the song's official release, the band played a smattering of live shows before going on tour in early 2017. In May 2017, the band released a second single, "This Is It". In June, it performed at the Governors Ball Music Festival in New York City, and two months later at Lollapalooza in Chicago. They also opened for Glass Animals in August 2017.

In September 2017, Lo Moon was one of three acts added to NPR's inaugural Slingshot emerging artist series. They also opened for Ride. The following month, they opened for Phoenix on five dates in North America and toured with London Grammar in the United Kingdom and Europe. That month, they also released a new single, "Thorns". The band began headlining shows in November 2017, including sold-out stops at the Troubadour in Los Angeles and at Rough Trade NYC.

In January 2018, the band announced details of its self-titled debut album. The album was released on February 23, 2018 through Columbia Records, and produced by Chris Walla and François Tétaz. The song "This Is It" peaked at number 6 on the Billboard Adult Alternative Songs chart that month, and the band performed it (along with "Loveless") on Jimmy Kimmel Live on January 16.

On November 28, 2018, the band announced that drummer Sterling Laws, previously a touring member of the band, was now a full band member.

On July 16, 2024, the band announced that drummer Sterling Laws left the band to pursue other musical endeavors.

== Discography ==
=== Albums ===
List of studio albums with selected album details
Title	Details	Peak chart positions	
Title	Details	US Heat	SCO
Lo Moon	Released: February 23, 2018; Label: Columbia Records; Formats: CD, Vinyl, Digital download	4	86
A Modern Life	Released: February 25, 2022; Label: Thirty Tigers / The Orchard; Formats: CD, Vinyl, Cassette, Digital download		
I Wish You Way More Than Luck	Released: April 5, 2024; Label: Thirty Tigers / Strngr Recordings; Formats: CD, Vinyl, Digital download		

=== Singles ===
List of singles, with selected chart positions, showing year released and album name
Title	Year	Peak chart positions		Album
Title	Year	US AAA	US Rock Air	Album
"Loveless"	2016	5	—	Lo Moon
"This Is It"	2017	6	45	Lo Moon
"Thorns"	2017	—	—	Lo Moon
"Real Love"	2018	26	—	Lo Moon
"For Me, It's You"	2018	—	—	non-album single
"Dream Never Dies"	2021	21	—	A Modern Life
"Water"	2024	25	—	I Wish You Way More Than Luck
