= Special Explosion =

American rock band

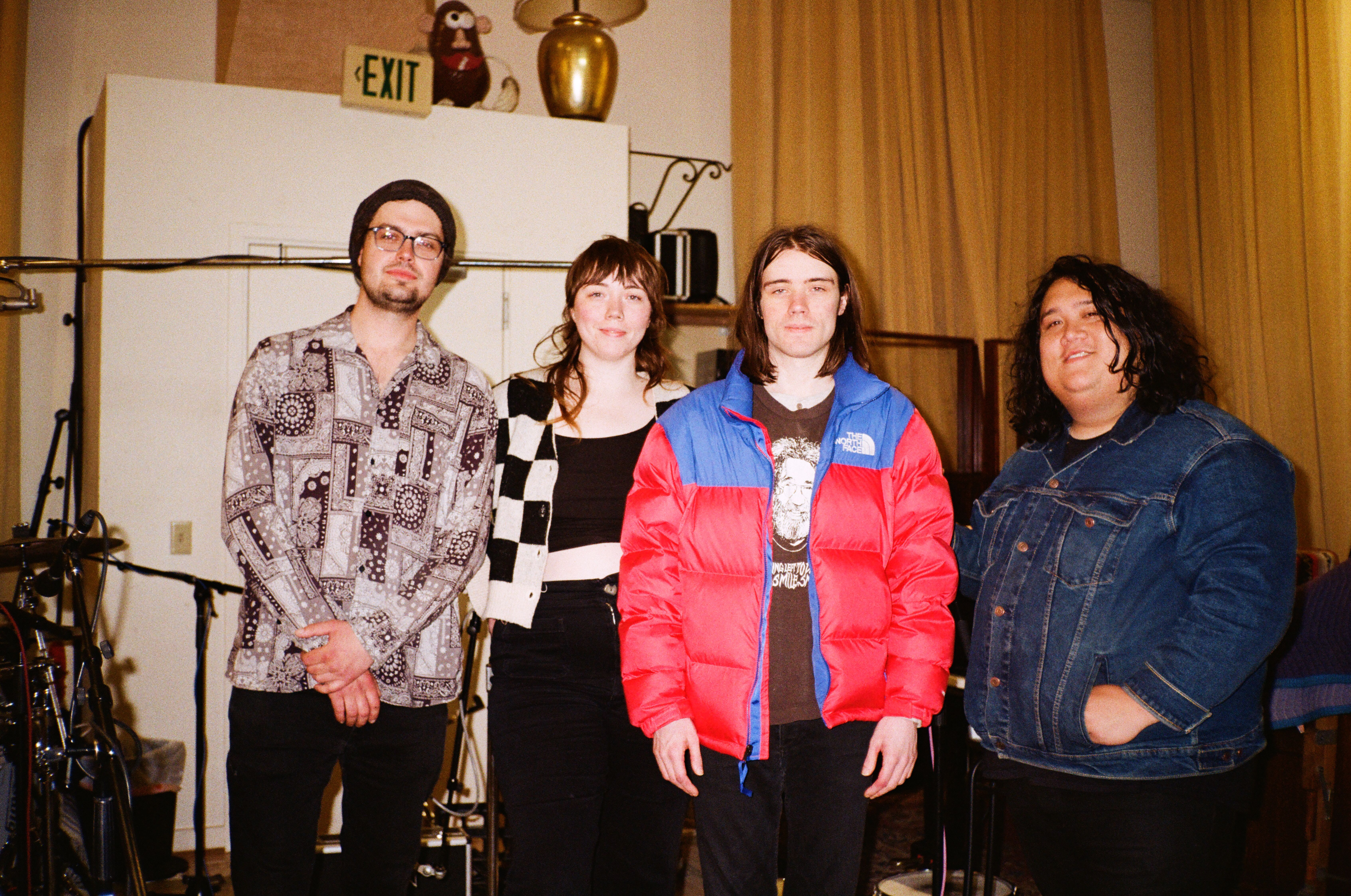
- Special Explosion at Litho in Seattle

Background information
- Origin: Seattle, Washington, U.S.
- Genres: Indie rock
- Years active: 2012–present
- Labels: Topshelf Records

Special Explosion is an American rock band from Seattle, Washington.

== History ==
Special Explosion began in 2012 with the release of their first EP. In 2014, Special Explosion released their second EP titled The Art of Mothering on Topshelf Records. In December 2017, Special Explosion released their debut full-length album, To Infinity, on Topshelf Records. The album received a 7.5 out of 10 rating from Pitchfork.
