= Blood Circus (band) =

American rock band

- Origin: Seattle, Washington, U.S.
- Genres: Sludge metal, grunge
- Years active: 1986–1989, 1992, 2007
- Labels: Sub Pop
- Past members: Michael Anderson (vocals, guitar); Geoff Robinson (guitar); Tracy "T-Man" Simmons (bass); Doug Day (drums)

Blood Circus was a short-lived band from Seattle, Washington, formed in 1986 that has been described as sludge metal or grunge. Rock journalist Ned Raggett writing in AllMusic describes the band's music as "rough and ready, sludgy guitar rock with a bad attitude".

== History ==
The band's first release was a single, 1988's "Two Way Street"/"Six Foot Under", on Sub Pop. Both Mudhoney and Nirvana performed their first shows in Seattle opening for Blood Circus at the Vogue in 1988.

In 1989 Sub Pop released the band's first and only album, a five-track EP called Primal Rock Therapy which, despite being now recognised as a milestone record of that time and place, was at the time panned by the critics and ignored by the public. This contributed to the split of the band in 1989 after a North American tour with the French band Les Thugs. Both bands played in San Francisco in June 1989.

They briefly reformed in 1992, when Sub Pop re-released Primal Rock Therapy on CD with five additional unreleased tracks. The rerelease comprised almost all of the band's recorded output, except for the song "The Outback", which can be found on the Sub Pop 200 compilation. The band also briefly appeared in the 1996 film Hype!, a documentary about the rise of the Seattle scene.

Blood Circus performed a one-off reunion show at Seattle's Crocodile Cafe in 2007.

In April 2012 Geoff Robinson conducted a comprehensive audio interview with Music Life Radio about Blood Circus, and his life.

In May 2017 "Six Foot Under" was included on the deluxe reissue of Singles: Original Motion Picture Soundtrack.

== Discography ==
- Two Way Street/Six Foot Under 7" (1988)
- Primal Rock Therapy EP (1988)
- Sub Pop 200 – "The Outback" (1988)
- Primal Rock Therapy (1992) CD re-release with 5 previously unreleased tracks from 1989.
- Unreleased Ünd Live (2007) CD compilation with 12 previously unreleased live tracks from 1988 to 1989.
- Dead Beats (2020) CD compilation of remastered tracks from Primal Rock Therapy and the Two Way Street / Six Foot Under single. Limited Self-release by the band through Bandcamp.
