= Gruntruck =

American rock band

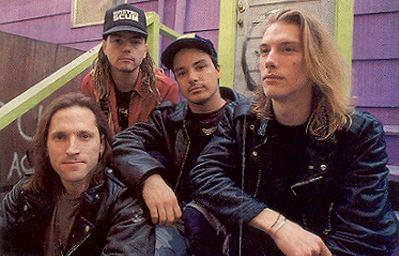
- Gruntruck circa 1991 Photo by Alison Braun

Background information
- Origin: Seattle, Washington, U.S.
- Genres: Grunge, alternative metal
- Years active: 1989–2003, 2017
- Labels: Roadrunner, eMpTy, Betty, Found Recordings
- Members: Ben McMillan (deceased); Tom Niemeyer; Tim Paul; Norman Scott; Alex Sibbald; Josh Sinder
- Website: gruntruck.com

Gruntruck was an American grunge band formed in 1989 in Seattle, Washington, by vocalist Ben McMillan and drummer Norman Scott, both previously from early Seattle sound pioneers Skin Yard. While in Skin Yard, Norman also briefly joined Soundgarden, and collaborated with Chris Cornell on a lesser-known band, the low frequency power trio Bass Truck. Lead guitarist Tommy Niemeyer from crossover thrash band The Accüsed and bassist Tim Paul, previously of Portland hardcore punk band Final Warning, rounded out the initial, classic lineup.

Gruntruck's sound is described as grunge, and the band focuses more on the metal side of the genre. In 2017, Metal Injection ranked Gruntruck at number 4 on their list of "10 Heaviest Grunge Bands".

== History ==
While on tour with Skin Yard, Ben and Norman wrote a song (Paint from Inside Yours) in Tucson, Arizona, the style and atmosphere of which Ben felt were worthy of forming a new band around. Before long Ben, Norman, and Tom began to collaborate on blending Bass Truck's sound with this new material, and brought in Tim Paul on bass to fill in the sound later that year. After several attempts at titling the new lineup, the name Gruntruck came to Ben while out record shopping.

The band soon recorded a full-length album for Seattle label Empty Records, with Skin Yard alum/legendary producer Jack Endino (Nirvana, Soundgarden) producing with Gary King. Inside Yours was released in 1990, and was released simultaneously in Germany on the Musical Tragedies label. Gruntruck made a video for the song "Not a Lot to Save" with Henry Shepherd (brother of Soundgarden bassist Ben) directing, and Robert Jett Barkley as Director of Photography. The video, shot at the Steam Plant in South Seattle, soon found its way onto MTV.

In 1991, Gruntruck gained further exposure after opening for Pearl Jam on the night they recorded the music video for the song Even Flow; during the frenzy of media and record label attention that had descended on Seattle, they signed a multi-album deal with Roadrunner Records. Roadrunner re-released Inside Yours later that same year.

In 1992, the band recorded their second album, Push, with Endino and King again in charge of production. Roadrunner released it that same year, and also licensed Inside Yours for release in Japan on the Appolon Records label. The track "Tribe" was made into a music video and appeared on the soundtrack of the film PCU, also earning an enthusiastic reception on MTV and rotation on the show Headbangers Ball.

They toured the U.S. and Canada with Alice in Chains in fall of 1992, as well as Europe in the winter of 1993 with Pantera, who were supporting Vulgar Display of Power. According to Sean Kinney, they were Alice in Chains' most supported band at the time, opening alongside the Screaming Trees for Alice in Chains' Dirt tour.

Tim left the band shortly after their return to Seattle, and was replaced by Alex Sibbald of The Accüsed.

Shortly thereafter, a video was made for Crazy Love, which garnered generous airplay on MTV and a rare snark-free mention on the show Beavis and Butt-Head, where a stunned Butthead mused, "I must be hallucinating now. I can't believe they're playing something cool. These guys rock!"

Following a particularly grueling tour of the States, Norman left the band and was replaced by Josh Sinder, also of The Accüsed.

In 1996, even though the band was at the height of their popularity, they were struggling to make ends meet while fulfilling contractual obligations to Roadrunner Records. Major record label PolyGram offered to buy out Gruntruck's contract for $1 million, but Roadrunner refused. Subsequently, on the advice of their attorney, Gruntruck filed for bankruptcy in an attempt to break free of their contract. The label sued to block the bankruptcy petition, resulting in a precedent-setting case that has been cited in subsequent cases, written up in legal journals, and eventually inspiring major congressional legislation. The court ultimately ruled in Gruntruck's favor, but the litigation would exact a severe financial and emotional toll on the band. The lineup of Ben, Tom, Alex and Josh released a three-song EP, Shot, on Betty Records in 1996, with Endino and King producing for a third time. The new lineup attempted to recapture the momentum Gruntruck had enjoyed before the lawsuit by stoking a bidding war for the newly available band. However, at a showcase in Los Angeles with A&R representatives from nearly all of the major labels in attendance, the music industry was uniformly perplexed by singer Ben's decision to perform with his back to the audience and the band remained unsigned.

In 1997, the original lineup was reunited after Norman and Tim rejoined to play extensively in local venues, and the band began working on new material together as well as with a side project called Mona Diesel. Some of the songs written during this latter collaboration would find their way back to Gruntruck.

These new songs were the foundation of what was envisioned as their breakthrough third album. The original lineup then began a two-year journey recording in five different studios in and around Seattle with both Jack Endino and Martin Feveyear (Mudhoney, Screaming Trees, Queens of the Stone Age) producing.

Once the self-titled third album was complete, the band ramped up their live performances around Seattle in preparation for the album's release. Then in 2003, the band took what was envisioned to be a brief hiatus to give Ben time to recover from his recent health issues.

Ben McMillan died at age 46 from complications related to diabetes on January 26, 2008.

The finished third album languished in the vaults until 2016, when Jack Endino mentioned its existence to Found Recordings head, Scott Blum, who enthusiastically embarked on a journey with the band to bring the album to the world. The self-titled third album, nicknamed 'Phoenix' (which included also the songs of the Mona Diesel era), was released on October 13, 2017, by Found Recordings, and the remaining original members will honor the late singer's memory by reuniting for a limited number of live performances with a guest singer later in the year.

== Members ==
- Ben McMillan – vocals, guitar (1989–2003; died 2008)
- Tom Niemeyer – guitar (1989–2003, 2017)
- Tim Paul – bass (1989–1993, 1997–2003, 2017)
- Norman Scott – drums (1989–1993, 1997–2003, 2017)
- Alex Sibbald – bass (1993–1996)
- Josh Sinder – drums (1993–1996)

== Discography ==
=== Studio albums ===
- 1990: Inside Yours (empty Records/Roadrunner Records)
- 1992: Push (Roadrunner Records)
- 2017: Gruntruck (The Phoenix Record) (Found Recordings)

=== Singles & EPs ===
- 1992: "Tribe" (Roadrunner Records)
- 1992: "Above Me" (Roadrunner Records)
- 1992: "Crazy Love" (Roadrunner Records)
- 1996: Shot EP (Betty Records)
- 2017: "Bar Fly" (Found Recordings)

=== Compilations ===
- 1991: Another Damned Seattle Compilation (Dashboard Hula Girl Records)
- 2005: The All-Star Sessions (Roadrunner Records) – appearance by Tommy Niemeyer, credited as member of Gruntruck
