= Skin Yard =

American rock band

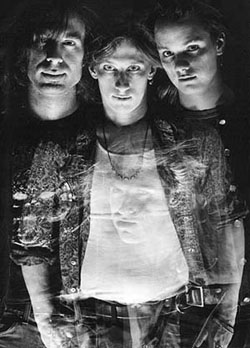
- Publicity photo 1988

Background information
- Origin: Seattle, Washington, U.S.
- Genres: Grunge
- Years active: 1985–1992
- Labels: Cruz; Toxic Shock; C/Z; Sub Pop
- Past members: Ben McMillan; Jack Endino; Daniel House; Matt Cameron; Steve Wied; Jason Finn; Scott McCullum; Barrett Martin; Pat Pedersen
- Website: skin-yard.com

Skin Yard was an American grunge band from Seattle, Washington, that was active from 1985 to 1992. The group never gained a mainstream audience but were an influence on several of their grunge contemporaries, including Soundgarden, Screaming Trees, and Green River.

== History ==
The band was formed in January 1985 by Daniel House and Jack Endino, who were subsequently joined by Ben McMillan and Matt Cameron. Skin Yard played its first official concert on June 7, 1985, opening for the U-Men. A few months later, Skin Yard contributed two songs to the now-renowned Deep Six compilation. In addition to featuring the first commercial recordings of Malfunkshun, Melvins, Soundgarden, and Skin Yard, this album was the first to showcase the early grunge sound. In 1987, Skin Yard released their self-titled debut album and their first single, "Gelatin Babies".

Shortly after these releases, drummer Matt Cameron left the band to join Soundgarden. After Cameron's departure, the band went through a series of drummers. He was initially replaced by Steve Wied, and Greg Gilmore filled in. In the fall, Jason Finn joined but left after eight months for personal reasons. Scott McCullum filled the vacancy in May 1987 and he remained for two years, during which time the band recorded and released their second album, Hallowed Ground (1988). However, McCullum left and the band took a fourteen-month hiatus after a U.S. tour quoted as being "the tour from hell".

Skin Yard returned in 1990 with their third album, Fist Sized Chunks, and their final drummer, Barrett Martin. In 1991, as grunge was breaking into the mainstream, the band released their fourth album, 1000 Smiling Knuckles. That same year, original bassist Daniel House left the band to spend more time with his family. He was replaced by Pat Pedersen, who stayed with the band for the recording of their final album, Inside the Eye, which featured the single "Undertow". After the recording was completed, Skin Yard decided to disband, and the album was released shortly after.

=== Post-breakup ===
Prior to the breakup, Ben McMillan and Scott McCullum had started the band Gruntruck as a side-project and continued to perform with the band after Skin Yard's demise. By the time Gruntruck disbanded, they had released two albums and one EP. Ben McMillan died from diabetes in 2008 at the age of 46.

Pat Pedersen and Barrett Martin worked with Jack Endino on his solo album Endino's Earthworm. Endino also released two other solo albums, Angle of Attack and Permanent Fatal Error. Endino has largely switched from working as a performer to working as a music producer. He produced several albums by the grunge bands Soundgarden (a band including original Skin Yard drummer Matt Cameron) and Mudhoney; more recently he has produced albums by artists such as Hot Hot Heat and ZEKE.

Daniel House, as owner and president of C/Z Records, continued to release records until 2001 when he released the Skin Yard rarities album, Start at the Top.

Barrett Martin joined Screaming Trees and drummed on their albums Sweet Oblivion and Dust. Screaming Trees went on hiatus and finally broke up in 2000. Martin has also toured with R.E.M. During the late 1990s, Martin formed the grunge supergroup Mad Season with Alice in Chains singer Layne Staley, Pearl Jam lead guitarist Mike McCready, and bassist John Baker Saunders. Mad Season released one album before breaking up in 1999.

Jason Finn, who was replaced by McCullum in Skin Yard, went on to drum for the band Love Battery until 1995 and the band The Presidents of the United States of America until their breakup in 1998.

== Influences and legacy ==
Skin Yard cited influences including the Stooges, the Velvet Underground, Black Sabbath, Swans, Sonic Youth, Gang of Four, Joy Division, Wire, Killing Joke, Pink Floyd and King Crimson. In a 2024 interview Matt Cameron stated "Skin Yard and Soundgarden, to some degree, had an influence on each other".

In 2017, Metal Injection ranked Skin Yard at number 8 on their list of "10 Heaviest Grunge Bands".

== Band members ==
Original lineup

- Ben McMillan – vocals (1985–1992, died 2008)
- Jack Endino – guitar (1985–1992)
- Daniel House – bass (1985–1991)
- Matt Cameron – drums (1985–1986)

Later members

- Steve Wied – drums (1986)
- Greg Gilmore – drums (1986)
- Jason Finn – drums (1986–1987)
- Scott McCullum – drums (1987–1989)
- Barrett Martin – drums (1990–1992)
- Pat Pedersen – bass (1991–1992)

== Discography ==
=== Studio albums ===
| Title | Year | Label |
|---|---|---|
| Skin Yard | 1987 | C/Z Records |
| Hallowed Ground | 1988 | Toxic Shock Records |
| Fist Sized Chunks | 1990 | Cruz Records |
| 1000 Smiling Knuckles | 1991 | Cruz Records |
| Inside the Eye | 1993 | Cruz Records |
| Start at the Top | 2001 | C/Z Records |

=== Singles/EPs ===
| Year | Title | Album | Label |
|---|---|---|---|
| 1987 | "Bleed" | Skin Yard | C/Z Records |
| 1988 | "Stranger" | Hallowed Ground | Toxic Shock Records |
| 1989 | "Start at the Top" | Start at the Top | Sub Pop |
| 1991 | "1000 Smiling Knuckles" | 1000 Smiling Knuckles | Cruz Records |
| 1991 | "Psychoriflepowerhypnotized" | 1000 Smiling Knuckles | Rave Records |
| 1993 | "Undertow" | Inside the Eye | Cruz Records |

=== Compilation appearances ===
- 1985 – "Throb" and "The Birds" on Deep Six
- 1988 – "American Nightmare" on Secretions
- 1990 – "Snowblind" on Hard to Believe: Kiss Covers Compilation
- 1991 – "Machine Gun Etiquette" on Another Damned Seattle Compilation
