= Daniel House (musician) =

American record label owner

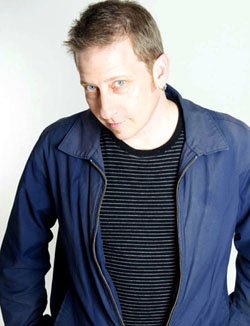
- House in 2009

Background information
- Born: August 8, 1961 (age 63); Berkeley, California, U.S.
- Genres: Grunge, punk rock, indie rock, alternative rock
- Occupation(s): Record label owner, musician
- Instrument: Bass
- Years active: 1982–present
- Formerly of: 10 Minute Warning ('84–'85) feeDBack ('84–'85); Skin Yard ('85–'91); Yeast (1989)
- Website: danielhouse.com

Daniel House (born August 8, 1961) is an American business owner and former musician. He was a co-founder and bass player for Skin Yard, a grunge band that was active from 1985 to 1992, and was president and owner of C/Z Records, a Seattle-based independent record label that released music by many bands, including 7 Year Bitch, Built to Spill, Coffin Break, Engine Kid, The Gits, Hammerbox, Love Battery, The Melvins, The Presidents of the United States of America, Silkworm, and Skin Yard. In 2003, House moved from Seattle to Los Angeles where he oversaw the development and creation of the now-defunct www.DownloadPunk.com as well as the music-centric (now offline) online dating website RocknRollDating.com.

== Career ==
House's first band was the little-known Seattle band Death of Marat, named after a painting by Jacques-Louis David depicting the assassination of radical journalist Jean-Paul Marat during the French Revolution. The band lasted for a little over a year, starting in 1982 and breaking up in late 1983.

In 1984 House formed an instrumental prog-rock three-piece band called feeDBack with Matt Cameron on drums and a guitarist named "Nerm" (real name Tom Herring). feeDBack lasted only 10 months but managed to record nine songs on a 4-track recorder that Cameron owned. The songs have subsequently been remixed and mastered by Jack Endino, and released in 2012 in MP3 format.

Shortly after forming feeDBack, House was recruited to play bass in 10 Minute Warning (TMW), replacing the recently departed David Garrigues. TMW was unique at the time in that they originated as a punk band, but had evolved into something slower, heavier and with psychedelic overtones. TMW are popularly regarded as one of the first progenitors of the grunge movement. 10 Minute Warning broke up at the end of 1984 after guitarist Paul Solger quit, and drummer Greg Gilmore left Seattle to join former 10 Minute Warning guitarist Duff McKagan in Los Angeles.

=== Skin Yard ===
On June 7, 1985, Skin Yard played their first show opening for the U-Men. Skin Yard's music was first released on the Deep Six compilation album which also featured tracks by Soundgarden, The Melvins, U-Men, Green River and Malfunkshun. Between 1987 and 1991, Skin Yard released four full-length records and embarked on several national and regional tours up and down the west coast. House quit Skin Yard in 1991 and has not actively played in a band since.

=== Later career ===
In 1988, House co-wrote and recorded The Last Laugh, Helios Creed's first for Amphetamine Reptile Records with Jason Finn on drums.

In 1989, House was the drummer for Seattle band, Yeast, who released one 7" single ("Crisco Wristwatch") and a track on Teriyaki Asthma Vol. I which also included tracks from Nirvana, Helios Creed and Coffin Break. The other members of Yeast were Milton Garrison from Vexed and Al Thompkins from Daddy Hate Box. Yeast highlights included sharing the bill once with Soundgarden and once with Tad.

In 1993, House played one show with the band Pretty Mary Sunshine (opening for Red House Painters) while bass player Joe Skyward was in Europe playing with The Posies. Pretty Mary Sunshine asked House to become their permanent bass-player, but he declined. That was the last time House performed on stage.

=== As record label owner ===
Daniel House purchased the rights and ownership of fledgling Seattle-based label C/Z Records from Chris Hanzsek in 1986. Initially House intended the label as a vehicle to release music by Skin Yard, his band at the time. Skin Yard's only previously released material was on C/Z's Deep Six compilation, and House wanted to maintain the ongoing sales efforts for the remaining LPs still in stock.

House continued to release records by other bands in the Seattle area, while working at a series of jobs, eventually working as Director of Sales and Distribution for Sub Pop Records in 1988. House left Sub Pop in 1991 in an effort to make C/Z a viable business. Over the next several years C/Z grew into an independent label.
