= Jack Endino =

American producer and musician

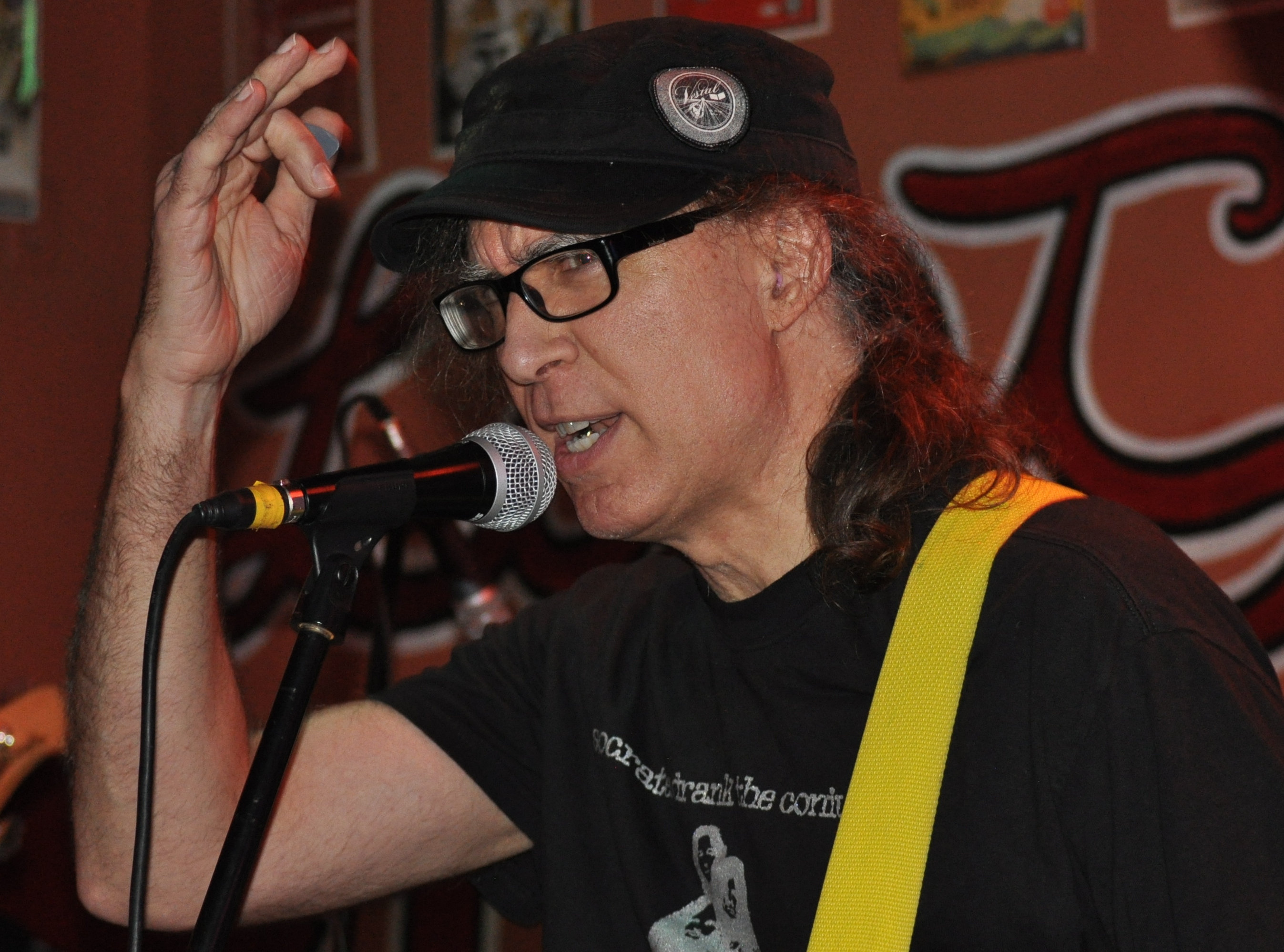
- Endino in 2014

Background information
- Also known as: J. Perry; The Almighty Himself
- Born: Michael M. Giacondino; 1964 (age 61–62); Southbury, Connecticut, U.S.
- Genres: Grunge, alternative rock, hardcore punk, heavy metal, indie rock, doom metal
- Occupations: Recording engineer, musician, record producer
- Instruments: Vocals, guitar, bass, drums
- Years active: 1985–present
- Label: Sub Pop
- Website: endino.com

Jack Endino (born Michael M. Giacondino; 1964) is an American producer and musician based in Seattle, Washington managing Soundhouse (recording studio). Long associated with Seattle label Sub Pop and the grunge movement, Endino worked on seminal albums from bands including Mudhoney, Soundgarden and Nirvana. He was also the guitarist for Seattle band Skin Yard, which was active between 1985 and 1992. He played guitar in Sky Cries Mary on three albums, from 2018-2024.

== Early career ==
In 1985, Endino and Daniel House started the grunge band Skin Yard. Though originally a drummer, Endino played guitar and Matt Cameron played drums until he left for Soundgarden. In 1986, Skin Yard contributed two songs to C/Z Records' grunge compilation Deep Six. In July 1986, Endino left his basement recording studio to found Reciprocal Recording with Chris Hanzsek, the Deep Six sound engineer, where he used his self-taught recording skills to produce, engineer, and mix Skin Yard's 1987 debut album Skin Yard.

His skill and low fees meant that he was soon an engineer of choice for up-and-coming Seattle grunge bands, and in 1988, he recorded Nirvana's debut album Bleach in 30 hours for $606.17, using a reel-to-reel 8-track machine. The album did well in the underground, and after the success of 1991's Nevermind it went platinum.

He recorded Bruce Dickinson's Skunkworks. He appeared in the 1996 grunge documentary Hype!, where he's referred to as "the godfather of grunge." Endino was also interviewed at length for the 2009 book, Grunge is Dead: The Oral History of Seattle Rock Music.

He recorded Death Is This Communion by High On Fire, released in 2007.

In 2009, Jack recorded the Flipper studio album Love, and the live album Fight (both with Krist Novoselic on bass).

Endino continues to work as a freelance producer and engineer, having worked on hundreds of records as of late 2025.

== Recording and production work ==
Because of the success of albums like Soundgarden's Screaming Life and Nirvana's Bleach in the mainstream, as well as recording Mudhoney, Screaming Trees, The Sonics, and L7, his raw, unpolished sound is still seen as a defining characteristic of grunge.

Jack won a Latin Grammy with Barrett Martin for in 2017 for co-producing and mixing Nando Reis's album Jardim-Pomar.

The album was released in late 2016. The 18th Latin Grammy Awards ceremony recognized it in the Best Portuguese Language Album category.

== As an artist ==
Endino released his first solo album, Angle of Attack, in 1989. Skin Yard disbanded in 1992, and he released a second solo album, Endino's Earthworm, in 1993. In October 2005, he released his third solo album, Permanent Fatal Error, and his fourth, "Set Myself On Fire" (Capacitor Records) in 2021.

He was second guitarist in the band Kandi Coded, which also features Volcom snowboarding pro Jamie Lynn. He played bass in Seattle band Slippage. In March 2013, Fin Records released Endino's EP Rumble, featuring a cover of the April 1958 single "Rumble" by Link Wray & His Ray Men. Since 2015, Endino has played lead guitar in Seattle rock band MKB ULTRA, and also with the improv-psych trio Beyond Captain Orca.
