= Mark Lanegan discography =

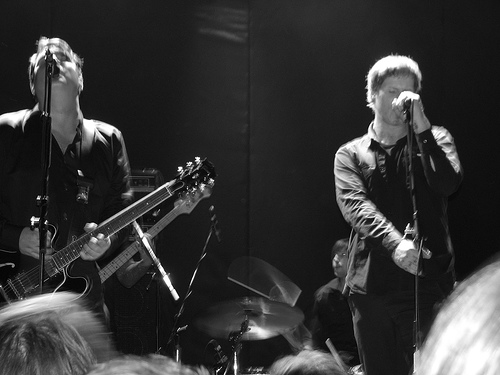
- The Gutter Twins at The Bowery Ballroom in 2008. From left: Greg Dulli, Mark Lanegan.
- Studio albums: 11
- Extended plays: 2
- Singles: 14
- Music videos: 8
- Other appearances: 11

The discography of Mark Lanegan consists of eleven studio albums and two EPs as a solo artist, and many other releases from collaborations with other artists.

After working with the Screaming Trees since the early 1980s Lanegan left the band due to internal strife over its creative direction. In 1990, Lanegan released his first solo album, The Winding Sheet, on Sub Pop Recordings; the album featured a collaboration with Kurt Cobain, "Down in the Dark". His second record, Whiskey for the Holy Ghost, was released on January 12, 1994. Lanegan released Scraps at Midnight which was his first album to chart and it peaked at 191 on the UK Albums Chart. In 2000 Lanegan guested on Rated R by Queens of the Stone Age, a band which he had become a full-time member of in 2001. In 2003 Lanegan started working with Greg Dulli as The Gutter Twins. They would release their debut album in 2008 which peaked at 117 on the Billboard 200; the highest placement for a Lanegan record. Lanegan recorded his sixth album, Bubblegum, in 2004; it became his first solo album to chart in the United States. He released the album under the name Mark Lanegan Band. In 2006, Lanegan released Ballad of the Broken Seas with Isobel Campbell, which was nominated for a Mercury Music Prize. This was followed by Sunday at Devil Dirt, released in 2008, and Hawk, released on August 17, 2010.

== Albums ==
=== Studio albums ===
List of studio albums, with selected chart positions
Year	Title	Peak chart position										
Year	Title	US	US Ind.	BEL	FIN	FRA	GER	IRE	ITA	NLD	NOR	UK
1990	The Winding Sheet: Released: May 1, 1990; Label: Sub Pop (SP #061); Formats: CD, CS, LP	—	—	—	—	—	—	—	—	—	—	—
1994	Whiskey for the Holy Ghost: Released: January 18, 1994; Label: Sub Pop (SP #132); Formats: CD, CS, LP	—	—	—	—	—	—	—	—	—	—	—
1998	Scraps at Midnight: Released: July 20–21, 1998; Label: Beggars Banquet (BBQ #204), Sub Pop (SP #419); Formats: CD, LP	—	—	—	—	—	—	—	—	—	—	191
1999	I'll Take Care of You: Released: September 20–21, 1999; Label: Beggars Banquet (BBQ #215), Sub Pop (SP #445); Formats: CD, LP	—	—	—	—	—	—	—	—	—	—	—
2001	Field Songs: Released: May 8, 2001 – June 11, 2001; Label: Beggars Banquet (BBQ #224), Sub Pop (SP #502); Formats: CD, LP	—	—	—	—	—	—	—	—	—	—	—
2004	Bubblegum: Released: August 2, 2004; Label: Beggars Banquet (BBQ #237); Formats: CD, LP	—	39	28	35	189	67	35	23	36	30	43
2012	Blues Funeral: Released: February 6, 2012; Label: 4AD (EAD3202); Formats: CD, LP, digital download	99	15	4	24	51	41	12	—	20	12	21
2013	Imitations: Released: September 17, 2013; Label: Vagrant; Formats: CD, LP, digital download	—	49	17	—	—	—	45	—	53	—	62
2014	Phantom Radio: Released: October 21, 2014; Label: Flooded Soil, Vagrant; Formats: CD, LP, digital download	148	—	21	—	131	—	27	—	53	—	22
2015	Houston Publishing Demos 2002: Released: August 21, 2015; Label: Ipecac; Formats: CD, Vinyl	—	—	—	—	—	—	—	—	—	—	—
2017	Gargoyle: Released: April 28, 2017; Label: Heavenly Recordings; Formats: CD, LP, digital download	—	—	8	—	127	—	46	—	36	—	22
2019	Somebody's Knocking: Released: October 18, 2019; Label: Heavenly Recordings; Formats: CD, LP, digital download	—	14	22	—	—	58	—	—	—	—	78
2020	Straight Songs of Sorrow: Released: May 8, 2020; Label: Heavenly Recordings; Formats: CD, LP, digital download	—	—	16	—	—	67	—	—	—	—	85
"—" denotes a release that did not chart.

=== Compilations ===
List of compilations
Year	Title
2014	Has God Seen My Shadow? An Anthology 1989–2011

=== With Duke Garwood ===
List of albums released in collaboration with Duke Garwood
Year	Title	Peak chart position									
Year	Title	US Ind.	BEL	FRA	ITA	IRE	NLD	NOR	SWE	SWI	UK
2013	Black Pudding: Released: May 13Recordings]] (IPC143); Formats: CD, LP	—	38	—	—	—	72	—	—	—	74
2018	With Animals: Released: August 24, 2018; Label: Heavenly Recordings; Formats: CD, LP	19	—	96	—	—	—	68	—	—	—
"—" denotes a release that did not chart.

=== With Isobel Campbell ===
List of albums released in collaboration with Isobel Campbell
Year	Title	Peak chart position								
Year	Title	BEL	FRA	ITA	IRE	NLD	NOR	SWE	SWI	UK
2006	Ballad of the Broken Seas: Released: March 7, 2006; Label: V2 (V2 #1035821); Formats: CD, LP	15	96	27	21	32	51	56	—	38
2008	Sunday at Devil Dirt: Released: May 13, 2008; Label: V2 (V2 #1050622); Formats: CD, LP	6	96	41	28	69	25	—	37	38
2010	Hawk: Released: August 16, 2010; Label: V2; Formats: CD, LP	5	119	—	—	54	21	—	28	29
"—" denotes a release that did not chart.

=== With Skeleton Joe ===
List of albums released in collaboration with Skeleton Joe
Year	Title	Peak chart position								
Year	Title	BEL	FRA	ITA	IRE	NLD	NOR	SWE	SWI	UK
2021	Dark Mark vs. Skeleton Joe: Released: October 15, 2021; Formats: digital download, LP	—	—	—	—	—	—	—	—	—
"—" denotes a release that did not chart.

== Extended plays ==
List of extended plays, with selected details
Year	Title
2003	Here Comes That Weird Chill^{[I]}: Released: November 4, 2003; Label: Beggars Banquet (BBQ #373CD); Formats: CD, LP
2012	Dark Mark Does Christmas 2012: Released: November 2012; Label: self-released; Formats: CD
2014	No Bells on Sunday: Released: July 29, 2014; Label: Flooded Soil/Vagrant Records; Formats: Vinyl
2020	Dark Mark Does Christmas 2020: Released: December 11, 2020; Label: self-released; Formats: CD, Vinyl

I Appeared on the UK Budget Albums Chart at number 35.

== Singles ==
List of singles, with selected chart positions, showing year released and album name
Year	Song	Peak chart position	Album
Year	Song	UK	Album
1990	"Down in the Dark"	—	The Winding Sheet
1994	"House a Home"	—	Whiskey for the Holy Ghost
1998	"Stay"	—	Scraps at Midnight
2002	"No One Knows" (as part of Queens of the Stone Age)	15	Songs for the Deaf
2004	"Sideways in Reverse"	—	Bubblegum
2004	"Hit the City" (featuring PJ Harvey)	76	Bubblegum
2005	"Burn the Witch" (as part of Queens of the Stone Age)	—	Lullabies to Paralyze
2006	"Ramblin' Man" (with Isobel Campbell)	116	Ballad of the Broken Seas
2006	"Honey Child What Can I Do?" (with Isobel Campbell)	199	Ballad of the Broken Seas
2007	"Revival" (as part of Soulsavers)	—	It's Not How Far You Fall, It's the Way You Land
2007	"Kingdoms of Rain" (as part of Soulsavers)	—	It's Not How Far You Fall, It's the Way You Land
2008	"Who Built The Road" (with Isobel Campbell)	—	Sunday at Devil Dirt
2011	"The Gravedigger's Song"	—	Blues Funeral
2012	"Harborview Hospital"	—	Blues Funeral
2013	"Cold Molly" (with Duke Garwood)	—	Black Pudding
2013	"I'm Not the Loving Kind"	—	Imitations
2014	"Sad Lover"	—	No Bells on Sunday
2014	"Harvest Home"	—	Phantom Radio
2014	"Floor of the Ocean"	—	Phantom Radio
2015	"Needle of Death" (with Duke Garwood)	—	Needle of Death/Fresh as a Sweet Sunday Morning
2017	"Nocturne"	—	Gargoyle
2017	"Beehive"	—	Gargoyle
2019	"Stitch it Up"	—	Somebody's Knocking
2019	"Night Flight to Kabul"	—	Somebody's Knocking
2020	"Skeleton Key"	—	Straight Songs of Sorrow
2020	"Bleed All Over"	—	Straight Songs of Sorrow
2021	"Dark Mark Theme b/w Skeleton Joe Manifesto"	—	Dark Mark vs. Skeleton Joe

== Music videos ==
List of music videos
Year	Song	Director
1990	"Ugly Sunday"	Russell Bates
1994	"House a Home"	Russell Bates
2004	"Sideways in Reverse"	Charles Mehling
2004	"Hit the City"	Charles Mehling
2006	"Ramblin Man"	Vrnda Daktor
2006	"Time Is Just the Same"	Vrnda Daktor
2007	"Revival"	Ben Foley
2012	"The Gravedigger's Song"	Alistair Legrand
2013	"I'm Not the Loving Kind"	Andrew Van Baal
2014	"Sad Lover"	Steve Gullick
2014	"Floor of the Ocean"	Steve Gullick
2017	"Beehive"	Zhang + Knight
2017	"Emperor"	Joshua Lipworth
2019	"Stitch It Up"	Joe Cardamone
2019	"Night Flight to Kabul"	Dean Karr

== Collaborations and contributions ==
List of collaborations with other artists and contributions to other artists' projects
Year	Artist	Record	Credits	Ref.
1987	Steve Fisk	448 Deathless Days	"This Vacuum", "Johnny Smoke (Swamp Thing)" (violin)	
1988	Beat Happening	Jamboree	Co-producer of all songs	
1990	King Krab	Harmony in Defeat	"To the Sun" (background vocals)	
1991	Various artists	The Grunge Years	"Ugly Sunday"	
1993	The Walkabouts	Satisfied Mind	"Feel Like Going Home" (lead vocals)	
1993	Steve Fisk	Over and Thru the Night	"One More Valley" (background vocals)	
1995	Mike Watt	Ball-Hog or Tugboat?	"Max & Wells" (lead vocals)	
1995	Mad Season	Above	"I'm Above", "Long Gone Day", "Locomotive", "Black Book of Fear", and "Slip Away" (all lead vocals)	
1996	Various artists	Twisted Willie	"She's Not for You"	
1999	Various artists	More Oar: A Tribute to the Skip Spence Album	"Cripple Creek"	
2000	Various artists	Free the West Memphis 3	"Untitled Lullaby"	
2000	Various artists	Sing a Song for You: Tribute to Tim Buckley	"Café"	
2000	Queens of the Stone Age	Rated R	"In the Fade" (lead vocals), "Auto Pilot", "Leg of Lamb", "I Think I Lost My Headache" (background vocals)	
2000	earthlings?	Human Beans	"Rock Dove" (background vocals)	
2001	The Desert Sessions	Volumes 7 & 8	"Hanging Tree" (lead vocals)	
2001	Masters of Reality	Deep in the Hole	"High Noon Amsterdam" (lead vocals)	
2001	Various artists	Give The People What We Want: Songs of The Kinks	"Nothin' in the World Can Stop Me Worryin' 'Bout That Girl"	
2002	Queens of the Stone Age	Songs for the Deaf	"A Song for the Dead", "Hangin' Tree", "God Is in the Radio", "A Song for the Deaf" (all lead vocals)	
2003	Martina Topley-Bird	Quixotic	"Need One" (background vocals)	
2003	The Twilight Singers	Blackberry Belle	"Number Nine" (lead vocals)	
2003	Mondo Generator	A Drug Problem That Never Existed	"Four Corners" (lead vocals)	
2004	Melissa Auf der Maur	Auf der Maur	"Taste You" (background vocals)	
2004	The Twilight Singers	She Loves You	"Hyperballad" (background vocals), Bjork cover. "Real Love" (background vocals), "Strange Fruit" (background vocals), "Hard Time Killing Floor" (lead vocals)	
2004	Burning Brides	Leave No Ashes	"Vampire Waltz" (background vocals)	
2004	Isobel Campbell	Time is Just the Same EP	"Why Does My Head Hurt So?" (duet)	
2005	Queens of the Stone Age	Lullabies to Paralyze	"This Lullaby", "Precious and Grace" (lead vocals), "Burn the Witch", "You Got A Killer Scene, Man" (background vocals)	
2005	Various artists	Sunday Nights: The Songs of Junior Kimbrough	"All Night Long"	
2005	Various artists	Dog Train: A Wild Ride on the Rock and Roll Side	"Sneakers"	
2006	The Baldwin Brothers	The Return of the Golden Rhodes	"The Party's Over" (lead vocals)	
2006	The Twilight Singers	A Stitch in Time	"Live with Me" (lead vocals), Massive Attack cover; "Flashback" (lead vocals)	
2006	Eagles of Death Metal	Death By Sexy	"I Gotta Feelin (Just Nineteen)" (background vocals), "I Like to Move in the Night" (background vocals), "Poor Doggie" (background vocals)	
2007	Creature with the Atom Brain	I Am the Golden Gate Bridge	"Black Out, New Hit" (background vocals), "Crawl Like a Dog" (background vocals)	
2007	Soulsavers	It's Not How Far You Fall, It's the Way You Land	"Revival", "Ghosts of You and Me", "Paper Money", "Spiritual", "Kingdoms of Rain", "Through My Sails", "Jesus of Nothing" and "No Expectations"	
2007	Soulsavers	Revival	"Blues Run the Game". Single b-side. Jackson C. Frank cover	
2007	Queens of the Stone Age	Era Vulgaris	"River in the Road" (background vocals)	
2007	Various artists	I'm Not There: Original Soundtrack	"Man in the Long Black Coat". Bob Dylan cover	
2008	Bomb the Bass	Future Chaos	"Black River" (lead vocals)	
2008	Gary Heffern	Consolation	"All His Children" (lead vocals)	
2009	The Breeders	Fate to Fatal	"The Last Time" (lead vocals)	
2009	Creature With The Atom Brain	Transylvania	"Lonely Light" (lead vocals)	
2009	Soulsavers	Broken	"Death Bells", "Unbalanced Pieces", "You Will Miss Me When I Burn", "Some Misunderstanding", "All The Way Down", "Shadows Fall", "Can't Catch The Train", "Pharaoh's Chariot", "Rolling Sky", "Highway Kind" (Japanese and iTunes bonus track)	
2009	Various artists	Summer's Kiss: A Tribute to the Afghan Whigs	"Tonight"	
2009	Various artists	We Are Only Riders: The Jeffrey Lee Pierce Sessions Project	"Constant Waiting", "Free to Walk" (With Isobel Campbell)	
2009	My Jerusalem	Gone for Good	"Hit the Lights" (background vocals)	
2009	Various artists	Cook County	"Checkout" (lead vocals), "No Long Goodbye" (lead vocals). These two songs appear only on the movie itself, they were never released.	
2010	Unkle	Where Did the Night Fall	"Another Night Out" (lead vocals)	
2011	The Twilight Singers	Dynamite Steps	"Be Invited" (background vocals)	
2011	Maggie Björklund	Coming Home	"Intertwined" (duet)	
2011	Slash	--	"So Long Sin City" (lead vocals). This song was recorded for This Is Not a Movie soundtrack. It's only available through Slash's SoundCloud page.	
2011	Various artists	The Hangover Part II: Original Motion Picture Soundtrack	"The Beast in Me" (lead vocals)	
2011	Manna	Shackles	"Wishing Well" (duet)	
2012	Maciej Werk	Songs That Make Sense	"Long Cold Race"	
2012	Soulsavers	The Light the Dead See	"In the Morning" (background vocals)	
2012	Martina Topley-Bird	Crystalised (single)	"Crystalised" (duet), The XX cover	
2012	Various artists	Lawless: Original Motion Picture Soundtrack	"Fire and Brimstone", "White Light / White Heat" (The Velvet Underground cover). "Sure 'Nuff 'n Yes I Do" (Captain Beefheart cover) (all lead vocals)	
2012	Various artists	Light in the Attic 10 Year Anniversary: Karen Dalton "Same Old Man"	"Same Old Man"	
2012	Various artists	The Journey Is Long (The Jeffrey Lee Pierce Sessions Project)	"The Breaking Hands" (With Isobel Campbell)	
2012	Matt Boroff	Filling in the Cracks	"Garbage Man" (background vocals). Also available on Matt's solo album Sweet Hand Of Fate (2013)	
2012	The Separate	Orchestral Variations, Vol. 1	"Close to Me" (lead vocals), The Cure cover	
2012	Ülm3n	--	"12 Gates to the City" (lead vocals), Reverened Gary Davis cover. It's only available through Ülm3n's SoundCloud page.	
2012	Creature with the Atom Brain	The Birds Fly Low	"Black Rider Run" (lead vocals)	
2013	Christine Owman	Little Beast	"One of the Folks", "Familiar Act"	
2013	Moby	The Lonely Night	"The Lonely Night"	
2013	Queens of the Stone Age	...Like Clockwork	"If I Had a Tail", "Fairweather Friends" (all background vocals)	
2013	Various artists	Reason to Believe - The Songs of Tim Hardin	"Red Balloon"	
2013	Various artists	Frog Trouble and Eleven Other Pretty Serious Songs	"Frog Trouble" (lead vocals)	
2013	Various artists	Last Box of Sparkles (A Tribute to Mark Linkous)	"Spirit Ditch" (lead vocals). Planned but cancelled, not before this song was posted officially on a SoundCloud page by the label	
2014	Earth	Primitive and Deadly	"There Is a Serpent Coming", "Rooks Across the Gate"	
2014	Magnus	Where Neon Goes to Die	"Singing Man" (lead vocals). Available on the album's deluxe edition	
2014	Sweet Apple	The Golden Age of Glitter	"Wish You Could Stay (A Little Longer)" (background vocals)	
2014	Various artists	Axels & Sockets (The Jeffrey Lee Pierce Sessions Project)	"Constant Limbo (Constant Rain)" (shared vocals). "Desire By Blue River" (duet with Bertrand Cantat)	
2014	James Williamson	Re-Licked	"Wild Love" (duet with Alison Mosshart)	
2014	Gérard Manset	Un Oiseau S'Est Posé	"Cover Me with Flowers of Mauve (Elégie Funèbre)"	
2014	Afterhours	Hai Paura Del Buio?	"Pelle"	
2015	I Am Super Ape	Monki	"Monki" (lead vocals)	
2015	Ten Commandos	Ten Commandos	"Staring Down the Dust"	
2015	Various artists	Where the Candybeetle Dwells...	"Evil Bird"	
2015	Creature With The Atom Brain	Night of the Hunter	"Night of the Hunter - Part 1"	
2015	Mark Lanegan & Beth Orton	Your Kisses Burn	"Your Kisses Burn"	
2016	The Duke Spirit	Kin	"Blue & Yellow Light", "Wounded Wing"	
2016	Martyn LeNoble & Christian Eigner	Cat People (Putting Out Fire)	"Cat People (Putting Out Fire)" (lead vocals)	
2016	Dustin Boyer	Cahuenga Gardens	Vocals on "Woman Downstairs"	
2016	Christine Owman	When on Fire	"When on Fire"	
2016	Matt Boroff	Grand Delusion	"Thirst" (backing vocals)	
2017	Andrew Joslyn	Awake at the Bottom of the Ocean	"Desiderata"	
2017	Tinariwen	Elwan	"Nànnuflày" (lead vocals)	
2017	Unkle	The Road: Part I	"Looking for the Rain" (lead vocals)	
2017	Brian Reitzell	American Gods (Original Television Series Soundtrack)	"St. James Infirmary Blues", "I Put a Spell On You", "In the Pines" (all lead vocals)	
2017	Sweet Apple	Sing the Night in Sorrow	"World I'm Gonna Leave You", "Let's Take the Same Plane"	
2017	Dave Clarke	The Desecration of Desire	"Charcoal Eyes (Glass Tears)", "Monochrome Sun"	
2017	Torn Sail	This Short Sweet Life	"Ricochets"	
2017	Various artists	Hog Wild! A Frenzy of Dance Music	"Easy" (lead vocals)	
2018	Dead Combo	Odeon Hotel	"I Know, I Alone" (lead vocals)	
2018	Neko Case	Hell-On	"Curse of the I-5 Corridor" (lead vocals)	
2018	David Catching	Shared Hallucinations Pt. 1: Sonic Salutations from the Venerable Vaults of Rancho de la Luna 1972–1984	"Ghost"	
2018	Various artists	The Wall (Redux)	"Nobody Home" (lead vocals)	
2018	Nicole Atkins & Mark Lanegan	--	"November Rain" (duet with Nicole Atkins)	
2019	Dead Combo	Live Vodafone Paredes De Coura	"Fire of Love", "Wedding Dress", "I Know, I Alone"	
2019	Mark Morton	Anesthetic	"Axis" (lead vocals)	
2019	Unkle	The Road: Part II / Lost Highway	"Requiem (When You Talk of Love)"	
2019	Domkraft	Slow Fidelity	"Where We Part Ways"	
2019	Not Waving	Downwelling	Vocals on all tracks	
2020	Humanist	Humanist	"Kingdom", "Beast of the Nation", "Skull", "Gospel"	
2020	Agrio	La Murga EP	"A Drink of Poison Water"	
2020	Kira Skov	Spirit Tree	"Idea of Love"	
2020	Hey Colossus	Dances/Curses	"The Mirror"	
2021	Cult of Luna	The Raging River	"Inside of a Dream"	
2021	Manic Street Preachers	The Ultra Vivid Lament	"Blank Diary Entry"	
2021	The Armed	Ultrapop	"The Music Becomes a Skull"	
2021	The Devils (Italian rock band)	Beast Must Regret Nothing	"Devil Whistle Don't Sing"	
2021	Various artists	Home in This World: Woody Guthrie’s Dustbowl Ballads	"Dust Pneumonia Blues"	
2022	Lost Satellite	Bare Bones	"No Fun"	
2022	The Afghan Whigs	How Do You Burn?	"Jyja", "Take Me There" (backing vocals)	
2025	Chrissie Hynde (as Chrissie Hynde & Pals)	Duets Special (Cover songs with various artists)	"Can't Help Falling in Love"	
