= Has God Seen My Shadow? =

Compilation album by Mark Lanegan
- Released: January 14, 2014
- Length: 104:57
- Label: Light in the Attic

Mark Lanegan chronology
Imitations (2013)	Has God Seen My Shadow? (2014)	Phantom Radio (2014)

Professional ratings
Aggregate scores
Source	Rating
Metacritic	82/100
Review scores
Source	Rating
AllMusic	4.5/5 stars

Has God Seen My Shadow is a three-disc compilation album by Mark Lanegan, featuring songs from his releases between 1989 and 2011. It was released in January 2014 under Light in the Attic Records.

== Recording ==
The first two discs in the set contain tracks from his solo albums, while the third disc contains previously unreleased songs from various time frames and recording sessions. (The set does not include material from Lanegan's numerous collaborations during this period with the likes of Queens of the Stone Age, Twilight Singers, Soulsavers, or Isobel Campbell.) In his book I Am the Wolf: Lyrics & Writings, the singer sheds light on the origins of some of the unreleased tunes:

- "'To Valencia Courthouse' was literally written in the back seat of a car while on my way to a court appearance in Valencia, California..."
- "'Dream Lullabye' was my response to a challenge from a close friend and fellow gutter twin Greg Dulli to write an unabashed pretty song..."
- "Dylan Carlson is the 'D' from 'Blues for D,' a song about absent friends, like on Seattle's first hill, and the hard times we shared there."
- "'Leaving New River Blues' was recorded with a four-track machine in a hotel room on the Gold Coast of Australia and on the surface is about the disintegration of my brief, ill-fated first marriage, but like most of my songs is really just about myself."

Natasha Shneider sings on the track "Sympathy."

== Track list ==
Disc One
No.	Title	Length
1.	"Bombed"	1:10
2.	"One Hundred Days"	4:37
3.	"Come to Me"	3:45
4.	"Mirrored"	2:52
5.	"Pill Hill Serenade"	3:27
6.	"One Way Street"	4:19
7.	"Kimiko's Dream House"	5:26
8.	"Low"	3:14
9.	"Resurrection Song"	3:35
10.	"Shiloh Town"	3:20

Disc Two
No.	Title	Length
1.	"Creeping Coastline of Lights"	3:18
2.	"Lexington Slow Down"	2:59
3.	"Last One in the World"	4:24
4.	"Wheels"	4:35
5.	"Mockingbirds"	2:29
6.	"Wild Flowers"	2:58
7.	"Sunrise"	2:57
8.	"Carnival"	3:42
9.	"Pendulum"	2:15
10.	"The River Rise"	4:29

Disc Three
No.	Title	Length
1.	"Dream Lullaby"	1:52
2.	"Leaving New River Blues"	3:31
3.	"Sympathy"	2:16
4.	"To Valencia Courthouse"	3:09
5.	"A Song While Waiting"	3:27
6.	"Blues For D"	3:34
7.	"No Contestar"	1:14
8.	"Big White Cloud"	3:23
9.	"Following the Rain"	3:18
10.	"Grey Goes Black"	1:50
11.	"Halcyon Daze"	2:50
12.	"Blues Run the Game"	4:42
