= Bubblegum (Mark Lanegan album) =

2004 studio album by Mark Lanegan

Studio album by Mark Lanegan
- Released: August 10, 2004
- Recorded: 2003–2004
- Genre: Alternative rock, blues rock
- Length: 49:06
- Label: Beggars Banquet
- Producer: Mark Lanegan; Chris Goss; Alain Johannes

Mark Lanegan chronology
Here Comes That Weird Chill (2003)	Bubblegum (2004)	Blues Funeral (2012)

Isobel Campbell & Mark Lanegan chronology
Ballad of the Broken Seas (2006)

Singles from Bubblegum
- 1. "Sideways in Reverse" / "Driving Death Valley Blues" Released: 2004 (promo only); 2. "Hit the City" Released: November 8, 2004

Bubblegum is a 2004 rock album by American singer-songwriter Mark Lanegan, released on the Beggars Banquet label under the name "Mark Lanegan Band".

The album features a prominent cast of guest musicians, including PJ Harvey, Josh Homme and Nick Oliveri of Queens of the Stone Age, Greg Dulli of The Afghan Whigs, and Duff McKagan and Izzy Stradlin of Guns N' Roses. Also appearing is Lanegan's ex-wife, Wendy Rae Fowler. Notably, Bubblegum is the first album by Lanegan to not contain contributions by Mike Johnson, who was a long time musical partner for Lanegan, appearing on his first 5 solo studio records. Bubblegum was favorably reviewed by critics and remains Lanegan's most commercially successful release to date, reaching number 39 on Billboard's Independent Albums chart.

== Recording and production ==
The album was recorded at various locations from 2003–2004, including Rancho De La Luna (Joshua Tree, California), Donner & Blitzen (Arcadia), 11 a.d. (Hollywood), Del Boca Vista (South Pasadena), Sound City (Los Angeles), Stagg Street (Los Angeles), Lethal (Los Angeles), Sound Arts (Houston, Texas), and Kudzu Ranch (Mebane, North Carolina). Tracks were mixed by Rick Will (1–7, 9–10), Alain Johannes (11–14) and Mathias Schneeburger (8, 15), and recorded by Will, Johannes, Schneeburger, Tracey Chisholm, Jonas G., Aldo Struyf, David Catching, Brian Baker, Rick Miller, Rail Rogut and Pete Martinez. Photography for the album is credited to Anna Hrnjak, and art direction and design to Susan McEwoen.

"Hit the City" was the second and last single from the album and features the English rock musician PJ Harvey. "Hit the City" peaked at 76 on the British singles chart and was Lanegan's first single to chart. The album title comes from a lyric in the song "Bombed". In his 2017 book I Am the Wolf: Lyrics & Writings, Lanegan recalls:

While many of the songs came from a place of dejection and ennui at the end of a tempestuous relationship, "Bombed" in particular came about when, after I had written and recorded it in just a few minutes, I put a microphone in front of Wendy Rae Fowler, my soon-to-be-ex-wife, and had her sing along while simultaneously hearing it for the first time. I loved the result as it reminded me of Royal Trux, a band I liked.

Also in I Am the Wolf, the singer writes that he wrote the love song "Strange Religion" in a Tokyo hotel room. The song was used in season 6 of the Showtime television series Californication, as well as during the closing credits of a 2017 episode of Anthony Bourdain: Parts Unknown.

== Release and reception ==
Professional ratings
Aggregate scores
Source	Rating
Metacritic	85/100
Review scores
Source	Rating
AllMusic	4/5 stars
Blender	4/5 stars
Entertainment Weekly	A
The Guardian	4/5 stars
Los Angeles Times	3.5/4 stars
NME	8/10
Pitchfork	7.2/10
Q	4/5 stars
Spin	B+
Uncut	4/5 stars

Upon its release in August 2004, Bubblegum peaked at number 39 on the US Independent Albums chart, number 19 in Italy, number 28 in Belgium, number 30 in Norway, number 35 in Finland, number 36 in the Netherlands, number 43 in the United Kingdom, number 67 in Germany and number 189 in France. It was Lanegan's first commercially successful album. The single "Hit the City" peaked at 76 on the British singles chart and is Lanegan's first charted single. AllMusic's Mark Deming described the album: "With the Screaming Trees an increasingly distant memory and his brief tenure with Queens of the Stone Age seemingly over and done, Mark Lanegan appears to have well and truly become a solo artist, and while the dark and blues-shot introspections of Whiskey for the Holy Ghost and The Winding Sheet felt like a respite from Lanegan's usual musical diet of the time, Bubblegum sounds like an effort to fuse the nocturnal atmospherics of his solo work with the impressive brain/brawn ratio of his better-known bands." Deming awarded the album four out of five stars. The Guardian's Alexis Petridis also awarded the album four out of five stars, writing: "Lanegan once called his bluesy solo work "death dirges". From its matte black cover inwards, Bubblegum never stints on the dark stuff. There is drug-induced despair and failed romance, with music to match: sibilant drum machines that recall 1970s art-punks Suicide, dolefully minimal guitar figures, shrieking feedback and the unmistakable wail of PJ Harvey on backing vocals. At its bleakest and least tuneful, Bubblegum is powerful enough to take your breath away. In every sense, Bubblegum is a staggering record".

Pitchfork reviewer Matthew Murphy commented that "Throughout Bubblegum, Lanegan proves himself adroit at navigating the back alleys of Babylon, but after the record's umpteenth reference to loaded shotguns, '73 Buicks, and goin' cold turkey, one can't help but think he might eventually want to take a stab at some new material. So far, his voice has proven to be well-suited for whatever use he has put it to; hopefully next time he strays a little further afield to better stretch its limits." Stylus Magazine's Dave McGonigle: "It is, to be frank, one of the most remarkable and forward-looking rock albums that you will hear all year, and testament to Lanegan's ability to take desolate lyrics and fashion beautiful, redemptive tunes around them. This is the album that Lanegan always seemed about to make; forgive him his tardiness, and dive right in." CD Times's Karl Wareham: "'Bubblegum', on the whole, is something of a flawed classic. When it's good it's excellent, but there's one too many fillers to make it a perfect album. It's still one of the strongest albums released for quite a while. Slipping onto the shelves with hardly a hint of hype and that's OK, this is one album that shouldn't need it for it'll sell by word of mouth for years to come." Patrick Donovan of The Age awarded the album five stars and said: "It's hard to tell if the title is ironic, given the dark nature of the album, but perhaps he answers this on Bombed: "When I'm bombed I stretch like bubblegum." This album will resonate with listeners long after the storm has settled, the ice has melted and his words fade to black. A modern-day classic from one of rock's great survivors." Playlouder: "At times 'Bubblegum' is terrifying, exhilarating, intimate, sexy, weird, and downright wonderful. 'Bubblegum' is the sound of being loaded. 'Bubblegum' is highly addictive, so be careful."

== Track listing ==
All tracks are written by Mark Lanegan.

No.	Title	Length
1.	"When Your Number Isn't Up"	3:01
2.	"Hit the City"	2:48
3.	"Wedding Dress"	3:07
4.	"Methamphetamine Blues"	3:16
5.	"One Hundred Days"	4:36
6.	"Bombed"	1:08
7.	"Strange Religion"	4:07
8.	"Sideways in Reverse"	2:46
9.	"Come to Me"	3:45
10.	"Like Little Willie John"	3:53
11.	"Can't Come Down"	3:37
12.	"Morning Glory Wine"	4:27
13.	"Head"	3:04
14.	"Driving Death Valley Blues"	2:48
15.	"Out of Nowhere"	2:43

== Personnel ==
- Mark Lanegan – vocals, guitar on 6
- PJ Harvey – vocals on 2, 9
- Chris Goss – guitar on 1, 5, piano on 5, vocals on 5, choir vocal on 7
- Tracey Chisholm – tape manipulation on 1, 4, drum machines on 3, 10
- Molly McGuire – bass on 1, 10, background vocals on 4
- Aldo Struyf – feedback on 1, synthesizer on 4, 5, 7, 9, 10, 13, piano on 5, organ on 5, 10, tape manipulation on 7
- David Catching – organ on 1, guitar on 2, 3, 4, 10, lead guitar on 4, 5, 10, 15
- Wendy Rae Fowler – piano on 1, vocals on 3, 6, background vocals on 4, choir vocal on 7
- Joshua Homme – guitar on 4, 9, bass on 2, 4, 5, drums on 2, 3, 4, 5, lead guitar on 3, 9
- Keni Richards – drums on 2
- Jim Vincent – electronic drums on 2
- Mike Johnson – lead guitar on 2
- Ian Moore – background vocals on 2
- Bukka Allen – organ on 2
- Alain Johannes – lead guitar on 4, guitars on 11, 12, 13, 14, bass on 11, 12, 13, 14, drums on 11, 12, 13, 14, electronic drums on 11, 14 strings on 11, synthesizer on 11, background vocals on 12, keyboards on 12, 13, organ on 14
- Natasha Shneider – background vocals on 4
- Brett Netson – background vocals on 4
- Greg Dulli – background vocals on 4
- Nick Oliveri – background vocals on 4, bass on 7, choir vocal on 7
- Jonathan Russo – bass on 4
- Izzy Stradlin – vocals on 7
- Duff McKagan – vocals on 7
- Troy Van Leeuwen – piano on 7, guitar on 7, 9
- Joey Castillo – drums on 7
- John Kastner – guitar on 8, 15, background vocals on 8
- Eddie Nappi – bass on 8
- Dimitri Coats – lead guitar on 8, 15, drums on 8, 15, piano on 8
- Mathias Schneeburger – guitar on 8, background vocals on 8, piano on 15
- Melanie Campbell – bass on 15
- Tobey Torres – background vocals (uncredited)

== Charts ==
Chart performance for Bubblegum
Chart (2004)	Peak position
Belgian Albums (Ultratop Flanders)	28
Belgian Albums (Ultratop Wallonia)	73
Dutch Albums (Album Top 100)	36
Finnish Albums (Suomen virallinen lista)	35
French Albums (SNEP)	189
German Albums (Offizielle Top 100)	67
Irish Albums (IRMA)	28
Italian Albums (FIMI)	19
Norwegian Albums (VG-lista)	30
Scottish Albums (OCC)	32
UK Albums (OCC)	43
UK Independent Albums (OCC)	2
US Independent Albums (Billboard)	39

Chart (2026)	Peak position
Croatian International Albums (HDU)	36
