= Year of Mondays =

Studio album by Mike Johnson
- Released: 1996
- Genre: Alternative rock
- Label: TAG/Atlantic
- Producer: John Agnello, Mike Johnson

Mike Johnson chronology
Where Am I? (1994)	Year of Mondays (1996)	I Feel Alright (1998)

Year of Mondays is an album by the American musician Mike Johnson, released in 1996. Dedicated to Charlie Rich, it was Johnson's first album for a major label.

Year of Mondays was released around the same time as Martin + Me, by Johnson's Dinosaur Jr. bandmate J Mascis. TAG/Atlantic Records attempted to market the album to both modern rock and adult album alternative audiences.

== Production ==
The album was produced by John Agnello and Johnson. Mascis played drums on the album; Mudhoney's Dan Peters played drums on the tour that followed the album's release. Mark Lanegan contributed backing vocals, and Barrett Martin played bass. Johnson, who wrote nine of the 10 tracks, filled the album with "sad" songs simply because he likes listening to them.

== Critical reception ==
Professional ratings
Review scores
Source	Rating
AllMusic	4/5 stars
The Encyclopedia of Popular Music	3/5 stars
Fort Worth Star-Telegram	3/4 stars
MusicHound Rock: The Essential Album Guide	3/5 stars
The San Diego Union-Tribune	3/4 stars

Trouser Press called the album "a bridge between adult consequence and youthful abandon" and "a treat for glumsters of all ages." Rolling Stone wrote: "Delivered by Johnson in his rich baritone, such songs as 'Circle', 'One Way Out' and 'Where Am I?' boast beautiful and elaborate string and keyboard arrangements that owe more than a passing nod to the dreamy sounds of Five Leaves Left (1969) and Bryter Layter (1970), by the English folkie Nick Drake, as well as the contemporary orchestrated pop of Eric Matthews." The Chicago Tribune stated that the "tunes luxuriate in a brooding melancholy intensified with acoustic guitars and string-bathed arrangements."

The Philadelphia Inquirer thought that "Johnson has a world-weary voice reminiscent of Leonard Cohen, and his song arrangements are dark and lush." The Santa Fe New Mexican said that "the 12-minute 'Overdrive' is a Neil Youngy guitar workout worthy of Dinosaur Jr." The San Diego Union-Tribune concluded that "Johnson has a brooding voice that resonates like a call for help from a deep, dark hole in the ground." The Dallas Morning News deemed Year of Mondays "a mesmerizing collection of classical- and country-edged ballads and midtempo tunes."

AllMusic wrote that "there's plenty of slow, exquisitely sorrowful country-tinged misery here, too gently pretty in its melancholy to pander to the freaked-out/f*cked-up wing of alt-country, all too out of place to score anywhere with Nashville's cult of the hat in the '90s."

== Track listing ==
No.	Title	Length
1.	"Where Am I?"
2.	"One Way Out"
3.	"Way It Will Be/Too Far"
4.	"Another Side"
5.	"Circle"
6.	"Eclipse"
7.	"Left in the Dark"
8.	"Hold the Reins"
9.	"Say It's So"
10.	"Overdrive"
