= Straight Songs of Sorrow =

Studio album by Mark Lanegan
- Released: May 8, 2020
- Genre: Rock
- Length: 60:11
- Label: Heavenly Recordings
- Producer: Alain Johannes; Mark Lanegan

Mark Lanegan chronology
Somebody's Knocking (2019)	Straight Songs of Sorrow (2020)

Professional ratings
Aggregate scores
Source	Rating
AnyDecentMusic?	7.4/10
Metacritic	81/100
Review scores
Source	Rating
Allmusic	4/5 stars
Clash	8/10
Classic Rock	4.5/5 stars
The Irish Times	4/5 stars
NME	4/5 stars
Record Collector	5/5 stars
The Telegraph	4/5 stars

Straight Songs of Sorrow is the twelfth and final studio album by American singer Mark Lanegan. It was released through Heavenly Recordings on May 8, 2020. The album was inspired by writing his memoir Sing Backwards and Weep, which was published April 28, 2020. It's his first solo album credited to simply Mark Lanegan, as opposed to Mark Lanegan Band, since 2013's Imitations, and the first one credited to Mark Lanegan that doesn't feature former collaborator Mike Johnson.

== Track listing ==
All tracks are written by Mark Lanegan, except where noted

No.	Title	Writer(s)	Length
1.	"I Wouldn't Want to Say"		5:46
2.	"Apples from a Tree"	Lanegan, Mark Morton	1:55
3.	"This Game of Love"		4:48
4.	"Ketamine"		2:40
5.	"Bleed All Over"		3:35
6.	"Churchbells, Ghosts"		4:53
7.	"Internal Hourglass Discussion"		3:49
8.	"Stockholm City Blues"		3:38
9.	"Skeleton Key"		7:05
10.	"Daylight in the Nocturnal House"		3:05
11.	"Ballad of a Dying Rover"		4:36
12.	"Hanging On (For DRC)"	Lanegan, Morton	2:09
13.	"Burying Ground"	Shelley Brien, Lanegan	4:46
14.	"At Zero Below"		4:40
15.	"Eden Lost and Found"	Brien, Lanegan	2:46
Total length:			1:00:11

== Personnel ==
- Mark Lanegan – vocals (all tracks); Moog DFAM drum synth, Moog Sirin bass synth, Moog Sub Phatty, Organelle synth (track 1); ARP Omni 2 synth, Yamaha SK10 synth, Roland TR-909 drum machine (track 3); Roland Juno synth, Roland TR-909 drum machine (track 4); Oberheim DMX drum machine (track 5); Organelle synth (track 6); Organelle synth, BOSS DR Rhythm 550 (track 7); bass (track 9); electric guitar; Roland Juno synth (track 12)
- Alain Johannes – Yamaha SK10 synth, Shakers (track 1); electric guitar (track 2); vocals, frame drum, drum programming (track 3); bass, acoustic guitar, Minimoog synth, drum programming (track 5); Casio synth (track 7); resonator guitar, hang drum, harmonium, flutes (track 8); bass, percussion, cigfiddle, acoustic guitar, Mellotron strings, Novation Bass Station, Casio beatbox, DrumBrute (track 9); mandolin (track 10); electric guitar, Buchla Music Easel (track 11); LinnDrum drum machine (track 14)
- Shelley Brien – vocals (track 3); Yamaha SK10, Moog Sub Phatty, Roland 909 drum machine (track 13); Casiotone 701 (track 15)
- Ed Harcourt – piano (tracks 4, 6, 11, 14, and 15), Wurlitzer Electric Piano (tracks 4, 6, 11, and 14)
- Jack Bates – bass (tracks 4, 6, and 11)
- Jack Irons – drums (tracks 1 and 11), percussion (track 11)
- Mark Morton – acoustic guitar (tracks 2 and 12)
- Sietse Van Gorkom – strings (tracks 8 and 15)
- Adrian Utley – acoustic and electric guitar, Minimoog, Korg 3200 synth (track 10)
- Michael Parnin – mixing (all tracks), Gibson Maestro King drum machine (track 5), Eli 7030 drum machine (track 15)
- Dylan Carlson – electric guitar (track 1)
- Wesley Eisold – vocals (track 4)
- John Paul Jones – Mellotron (track 11)
- Greg Dulli – vocals (track 14)
- Warren Ellis – fiddle (track 14)
