= Houston Publishing Demos 2002 =

Album by Mark Lanegan

Demo album by Mark Lanegan
- Released: August 21, 2015
- Recorded: 2002
- Genre: Alternative rock; experimental rock
- Length: 38:46
- Label: Vagrant
- Producer: Randall Jamail

Mark Lanegan chronology
Phantom Radio (2014)	Houston Publishing Demos 2002 (2015)	Gargoyle (2017)

Houston Publishing Demos 2002 is a demo album by alternative rock artist Mark Lanegan. It was released on August 21, 2015 on Ipecac Recordings, although it was recorded thirteen years earlier. Musicians who played on the album include Lanegan collaborator Mike Johnson, guitarist Ian Moore, and Willie Nelson's longtime harmonica player Mickey Raphael.

== Recording ==
In his book I Am the Wolf: Lyrics & Writings, Lanegan writes he traveled to Houston in 2002 "to fulfill a publishing contract I had signed with an old friend, producer and label head Randall Jamail, a talented man who took no shit from anyone and who would not have been pleased if he knew the honest state of my unprepared and unraveling songcraft, such as it was." Lanegan wrote many of the songs in the parking lot on the spot as the band overdubbed in the studio. As he recalls in I Am the Wolf:

Despite the haphazard, stumble-burn way the writing was done, Randall did a stunning production job and in time I came to realize that instead of a bunch of demos, he had actually shaped a unique record that stood on its own merit. Among the tunes that have stayed in my mind: "When It's in You", which is an early version of "Methamphetamine Blues" and has a sort of mil psychedelic vibe instead of the more strident sound on the later version; "Grey Goes Black," a minimal miniature reflecting my numbness over 9/11; and "Way to Tomorrow," a song I wrote and recorded my last night in town upon hearing the devastating news that Layne Staley died.

Mark Deming of AllMusic: "The arrangements are full-bodied but leave plenty of open space, which suits the dusty overtones of Lanegan's melodies, and this music is a fine match for the phantoms and lost souls who populate Lanegan's songs (ten of which get their first public hearing on this release). Houston: Publishing Demos 2002 is by no means a lost masterpiece, but in many ways this is more satisfying and a better platform for Lanegan's talents than Bubblegum, which was his next solo effort, released in 2004.

Professional ratings
Aggregate scores
Source	Rating
Metacritic	(80/100)
Review scores
Source	Rating
AllMusic	3.5/5 stars
Pitchfork	(7/10)
Renowned for Sound	4/5 stars

== Track listing ==
All tracks are written by Mark Lanegan.

No.	Title	Length
1.	"No Cross"	2:10
2.	"Two Horses"	4:17
3.	"When It's in You (Methamphetamine Blues)"	4:17
4.	"High Life"	2:19
5.	"I'll Go Where You Send Me"	3:12
6.	"Grey Goes Black"	1:51
7.	"The Primitives"	2:04
8.	"Blind"	3:50
9.	"Halcyon Daze"	2:50
10.	"Nothing Much to Mention"	2:26
11.	"A Suite for Dying Love"	4:14
12.	"Way to Tomorrow"	5:41

== Personnel ==
- Mark Lanegan – vocals
- Mike Johnson – acoustic and electric guitar
- Ian Moore – guitar, sitar
- Bukka Allen – keyboards, accordion
- Steve Bailey – bass
- Keni Richards – drums
- Mickey Raphael – harmonicas
- Jon Langford – cover art
