= Scraps at Midnight =

Studio album by Mark Lanegan
- Released: July 21, 1998
- Genre: Alternative rock, blues rock
- Length: 40:33
- Label: Sub Pop; Beggars Banquet
- Producer: Mike Johnson & Mark Lanegan

Mark Lanegan chronology
Whiskey for the Holy Ghost (1994)	Scraps at Midnight (1998)	I'll Take Care of You (1999)

Singles from Scraps at Midnight
- 1. "Stay" Released: September 28, 1998

Professional ratings
Review scores
Source	Rating
AllMusic	4/5 stars
Pitchfork	7.9/10
Rolling Stone	3.5/5 stars

Scraps at Midnight is the third solo album by the American musician Mark Lanegan. It was produced by Lanegan and longtime collaborator Mike Johnson, and was released in 1998.

== Background ==
Scraps at Midnight could arguably be considered the final installment of a trilogy of albums (preceded by The Winding Sheet and Whiskey for the Holy Ghost) which feature the songwriter's interpretation of American roots music set to troubling lyrics that explore themes of loss, sin, and redemption. In a 2004 interview (currently available on YouTube), Lanegan stated "That's always been my goal since I started...It's sort of been my obsession to make records that had the feeling of the blues, the spirit of them, I think, but without being what we'd consider to be traditional blues, or twelve bar bar band blues, which is a boring, outdated mode and I'm not interested in it. But I am interested in the real feelings behind it."

== Recording ==
The album was recorded at the Rancho de la Luna in Joshua Tree, California. Opener "Hospital Roll Call" and the Cohenesque "Hotel" expands on the theme of self-abuse ("Hear the roars and the hush and the cold chill of time, and I'm happy murdering my mind"), while the gentle "Bell Black Ocean" and "Stay" deal with themes of love and perseverance ("Livin's not hard, it's just not easy, always keepin' the dogs off"). In his 2017 book I Am the Wolf: Lyrics and Writings, Lanegan elaborates on several of the compositions and clears up some misconceptions, writing that "Last One in the World" was not written about Kurt Cobain, as some have speculated, but "for my friend Layne Staley, who was still living at the time. I loved them both as family: Kurt was like a little brother, Layne like a twin." He also relates that the minimal lyrics to "Hospital Roll Call" came from "an unpleasant eight-day stay at a decrepit infirmary hallway in Montreal. Sixteen wasn't the room number, just what was written in black marker on the wall above my gurney."

In a 2012 interview, Lanegan expressed mixed feelings about the album: "If I heard it today I’d totally cringe, though there are a couple of songs on there, one of which I still play acoustically – 'Because of This' – that I think are really good."

== Reception ==
Stephen Thomas Erlewine of AllMusic writes "Although it's similar to its predecessor, Scraps at Midnight is arguably his most accomplished - it might just miss matching the excellence of Whiskey for the Holy Ghost, but with songs as uniformly strong and performances as passionate as these, it comes damn close."

== Track listing ==
All tracks are written by Mark Lanegan and Mike Johnson except where noted.

No.	Title	Length
1.	"Hospital Roll Call" (Lanegan)	2:58
2.	"Hotel" (Lanegan)	3:10
3.	"Stay"	3:29
4.	"Bell Black Ocean" (Lanegan, Johnson, Keni Richards)	2:43
5.	"Last One in the World"	4:24
6.	"Wheels" (Lanegan)	4:35
7.	"Waiting on a Train"	4:32
8.	"Day and Night" (Lanegan)	3:16
9.	"Praying Ground"	3:07
10.	"Because of This" (Lanegan, Johnson, Richards, Paul Solger Dana)	8:19

== Personnel ==
- Mark Lanegan - vocals, guitar, producer
- Mike Johnson - guitar, bass, producer
- Dave Catching - guitar, keyboards, bass
- Fred Drake
- Keni Richards
- Paul Solger Dana

=== Additional personnel ===
- Liz Burns - voice (on 7)
- Tad Doyle - drums (on 6)
- J Mascis - piano (on 6)
- Phil Sparks - upright bass (on 6, 8)
- Mike Stinette - saxophone (on 6)
- Terry Yohn - harmonica (on 8)

=== Technical personnel ===
- John Agnello - mixing; engineer (on 8,9)
- John Burton - engineer (on 9)
- Greg Calbi - mastering
- Terry Date - engineer (on 6, 8)
- Jack Endino - engineer (on 6)
- Charles Peterson - photography
- Judith Schaechter - artwork
- Kenneth Sherwood - design
