= I'm Not the Loving Kind =

Song by John Cale

from the album Slow Dazzle
- Language: English
- Released: 25 March 1975
- Genre: Rock
- Length: 3:12
- Label: Island Records
- Songwriter(s): John Cale

"I'm Not the Loving Kind" is a song written and produced by John Cale, originally featured on his 1975 album Slow Dazzle. In 1996, it was released on compilation The Island Years.

In September 2013, American musician Mark Lanegan released cover album Imitations on which was also featured his own version of this song. It was first single from this album. The video for the song featured a bushy-moustached cowboy in Las Vegas.

== Track listing ==
1. "Mr. Wilson"
2. "Taking It All Away"
3. "Dirty-Ass Rock 'N' Roll"
4. "Darling I Need You"
5. "Rollaroll"
6. "Heartbreak Hotel"
7. "Ski Patrol"
8. "I'm Not the Loving Kind"
9. "Guts"
10. "The Jeweller"
