= Wendy Rae Fowler =

American musician

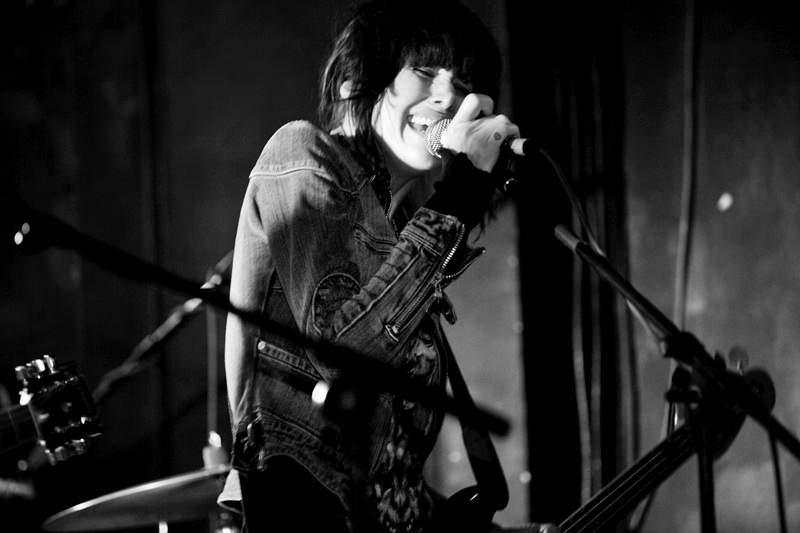

Background information
- Born: Wendy Rae Fowler
- Genres: Alternative rock, Experimental rock
- Occupations: Singer, musician, songwriter
- Instruments: Vocals, guitar, bass, piano, drums

Wendy Rae Fowler is an American musician, writer and producer, known for her work under her self-titled project and former moniker Katie Cruel, as the bassist of the British post-punk project Humanist, and the founder of Ghost Rhythm Records. She was formerly half of the experimental English rock band We Fell to Earth.

== Career ==
In fall of 1998, Fowler joined Earthlings? as second bassist. Immediately following, Earthlings supported Queens of the Stone Age on a small tour of the west coast of America as well as a European tour supporting QOTSA's self-titled debut album.

Fowler, under the QOTSA-appointed pseudonym 'Wendy Ray Moan', contributed backing vocals on two songs on QOTSA's second release Rated R.

Work with Earthlings and QOTSA led to meeting singer-songwriter Mark Lanegan in 1998 which resulted in collaborations on Lanegan's Field Songs and Bubblegum, as well as their marriage and eventual divorce.

In 2005, Fowler met Richard File (UNKLE, We Fell to Earth) at a social gathering in LA while UNKLE were in town recording their 4th album War Stories. The pair decided to schedule a writing session after an initial conversation revealed they had very similar influences. That first session would mark the birth of We Fell to Earth.

Alongside their debut 2009 self-titled release, tracks by the group have been featured in US dramas: "The Double" in Gossip Girl and CSI: NY and The Prisoner "Lights Out" In Numb3rs "Careful What You Wish For" in CSI: NY.

In the winter of 2010, the group composed the theme song to AMC'S The Killing from writer, executive producer, and series showrunner, Veena Sud. The show is based on the Danish television series Forbrydelsen and tells the story of the murder of a young girl in Seattle and the subsequent police investigation. The show debuted with a two-hour premiere on Sunday, April 3, 2011.

When We Fell to Earth disbanded after a clash with label In Stereo, Fowler began releasing music under the moniker Katie Cruel, releasing one EP with Timo Maas’ Rockets and Ponies before taking her own name as the project title. Her debut album, Warped, was released on Round Trip Records in 2018, peaking at #75 on the NACC Top 200 chart. After a three-year battle to recover the rights to the record, Fowler re-released the album in 2021 under the title Warped: Resurrection on her newly formed label, Ghost Rhythm Records. The label was founded by Fowler to provide a platform for artists to maintain creative control over their music and gain exposure. As a follow-up, in 2023, Fowler released her first score to the critically acclaimed BBC documentary, FLICKER+PULSE, on Ghost Rhythm Records.

In February 2024, Fowler joined the British collaborative post-punk and alt-rock project Humanist as a bassist as main support for the Depeche Mode Memento Mori tour and has remained as a core member since.

== Discography ==
=== Studio albums ===
- We Fell to Earth (2009)
- Warped (2018)
- Warped: Resurrection (2021)
- Flicker + Pulse (2023)

=== Singles and EPs ===
- We Fell to Earth EP (2009) "Lights Out", "The Double", "Deaf"
- This Is Not A Love Song (2021)
- Golden Brown (2021)
- Goo, Quiet Sounds In A Dark Hole, Vertical Rainbows (2023)
- City, City (re-release) (2025)

=== Collaborations and Cameos ===
- Queens of the Stone Age – Rated R (2000) – Vocals on "Feel Good Hit of the Summer" and "Quick and to the Pointless"
- Mark Lanegan – Field Songs (2001) – Vocals on "No Easy Action"
- Mark Lanegan Band – Here Comes That Weird Chill (2003) – backing vocals on "Methamphetamine Blues" and "Lexington Slow Down"
- Mark Lanegan Band – Bubblegum (2004) – Vocals on "When Your Number Isn't Up", "Wedding Dress", "Methamphetamine Blues", "Bombed", "Strange Religion"
- Eagles of Death Metal – Death by Sexy (2006) – Vocals on "I Like to Move in the Night", "The Ballad of Queen Bee and Baby Duck", and "Poor Doggie"
- The Duke Spirit – Neptune (2008) – Drums on "The Step and the Walk/Rich File Remix"
- Yawning Sons – Ceremony to the Sunset (2009) – Vocals on "Ghostship – Dead Water"
- UNKLE – Where Did the Night Fall (2011) – Vocals on "Money and Run" (feat. Nick Cave)
- Maya Jane Coles - Take Flight (2017) - Vocals on "A Chemical Affair" and "Misty Morning"
- A Snake In The Grass - Twelve Good Wacks (2019) - Vocals on "A Song For Me"
- Humanist - On the Edge of a Lost and Lonely World (2024) - Bassist
