= Here Comes That Weird Chill =

EP by Mark Lanegan
- Released: November 4, 2003
- Genre: Alternative rock, blues rock
- Label: Beggars Banquet
- Producer: Mark Lanegan

Mark Lanegan chronology
Field Songs (2001)	Here Comes That Weird Chill (2003)	Bubblegum (2004)

Professional ratings
Review scores
Source	Rating
AllMusic	3/5 stars
Uncut	3/5 stars

Here Comes That Weird Chill EP is a preview of Bubblegum by Mark Lanegan. The primary vocal version of "Sleep with Me", track 8 on the UK release, was omitted from the North American pressing.

== Background ==
In his 2017 book I Am the Wolf: Lyrics & Writings, Lanegan states that the songs on Here Comes That Weird Chill were recorded at the same time as the material that would be included on his next album Bubblegum:

For months I had been using off-time from my gig as an auxiliary singer for Queens of the Stone Age to try and complete a record, but as usual, my own insanity would not allow it. When it was all said and done, I recorded enough for two records, with the title for the first coming from something Greg Dulli said while shuddering involuntarily in the sudden cold wind walking to my car after a Twilight Singers recording session...

In the same book Lanegan singles out "Skeletal History" as a favorite, noting "I tried to channel the free form vocalisms of SST band Saccharine Trust to chart the skewed evolution of my own damaged species." The album also includes a cover of the Captain Beefheart song "Clear Spot."

American musician Wendy Rae Fowler, who was married to Lanegan at the time, contributed backing vocals to the tracks "Methamphetamine Blues" and "Lexington Slow Down".

== Reception ==
James Christopher Monger of AllMusic states, "Ex-Screaming Trees frontman Mark Lanegan growls his way through 'Methamphetamine Blues' like Small Change-era Tom Waits singing something off of Mule Variations...The sound is a bit muddy throughout and the vocals are often treated excessively, but considering the "extras" tag these are minor gripes, especially when assaulted by the machine gun imagery that snakes its way through 'Skeletal History.'"

== Track listing ==
All tracks are written by Mark Lanegan except where noted.

No.	Title	Length
1.	"Methamphetamine Blues"	3:16
2.	"On the Steps of the Cathedral" (Chris Goss, Lanegan)	1:43
3.	"Clear Spot" (Don Van Vliet)	3:39
4.	"Message to Mine"	3:17
5.	"Lexington Slow Down" (Lanegan, Keni Richards)	3:01
6.	"Skeletal History" (Josh Homme, Lanegan, Nick Oliveri)	4:14
7.	"Wish You Well"	3:07
8.	"Sleep with Me"	4:14
9.	"Sleep with Me - Version"	3:37

== Personnel ==
- Chris Goss - bass, guitar, vocals, backing vocals
- Josh Homme - bass, guitar, drums
- Nick Oliveri - organ, synthesizer, bass, backing vocals, voices
- Alain Johannes - guitar, multi-instruments, engineer, loops, mixing, post-production
- Dave Catching - rhythm guitar
- Greg Dulli - drums, backing vocals
- Dean Ween - guitar
- Wendy Rae Fowler – backing vocals on "Methamphetamine Blues" and "Lexington Slow Down"
- Aldo Struyf (Millionaire) - synthesizer
- Keni Richards - piano
- Oliver Goldstein - synthesizer, harmonica, keyboards
- Adam Maples - drums
- Ed Crawford - guitar
- Mary Huff - piano
- Jonathan Russo - bass, assistant
- Brett Netson - backing vocals

Technical

- Tracy Chisholm - engineer, loops, mixing
- Jonas G. - engineer, post-production
- Stephen Marcussen - mastering
- Pete Martinez - assistant engineer
- Edmond Monsef - assistant engineer
- Ben Mumphrey - assistant engineer
- Rail Jon Rogut - mixing, pro-tools
- Rick "Soldier" Will - engineer, mixing
