= Hit the City =

Single by Mark Lanegan

from the album Bubblegum
- Released: 2004
- Genre: Alternative rock
- Length: 2:48
- Label: Beggars Banquet
- Songwriter: Mark Lanegan
- Producer: Alain Johannes

Mark Lanegan singles chronology
| "Sideways in Reverse" (2004) | "Hit the City" (2004) | "Ramblin' Man" (2005) |

"Hit the City" is the second and last single from Mark Lanegan's breakthrough album Bubblegum. The song features the English rock musician PJ Harvey. "Hit the City" peaked at 76 on the British singles chart and was Lanegan's first single to chart.

== Track listing ==
1. "Hit the City"
2. "Mud Pink Skag" (exclusive b-side)
3. "Mirrored" (exclusive b-side)

== Personnel ==
- Mark Lanegan - vocals
- PJ Harvey - vocals
- Josh Homme - bass, drums
- Keni Richards - drums
- Jim Vincent - electronic drums
- Mike Johnson - lead guitar
- Ian Moore - background vocals
- Bukka Allen - organ
