= We Fell to Earth =

British rock band

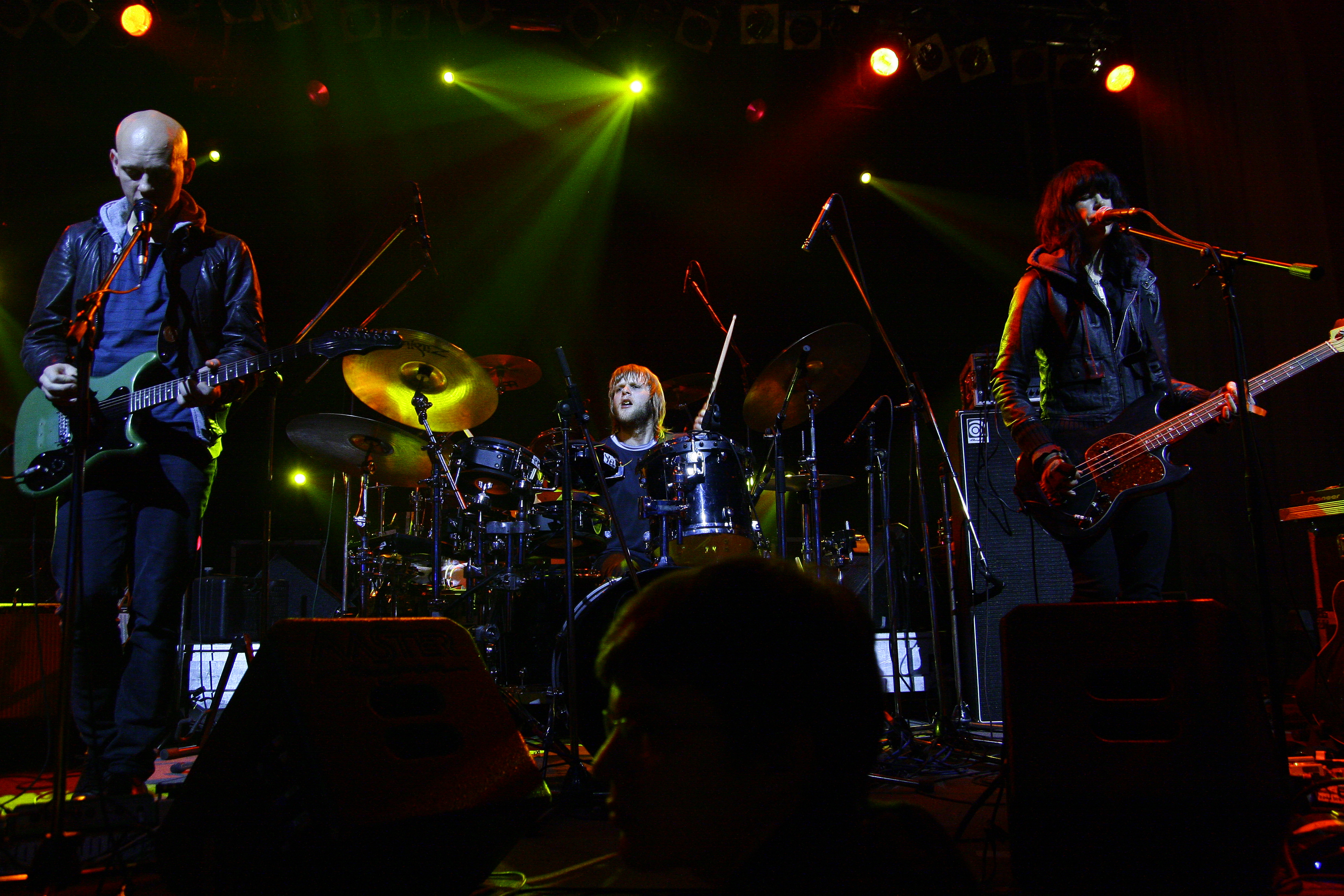
- photo by Olga Karpova

Background information
- Origin: London, England
- Genres: Alternative rock, trip hop, electronic, experimental rock
- Years active: 2008–present
- Label: In Stereo
- Members: Wendy Rae Fowler; Richard File; Mike Kelly (live band, drums)

We Fell to Earth are an English experimental rock band from London, England, consisting of Wendy Rae Fowler and Richard File. They performed their debut live show on 21 April 2009, at London's ICA to a sold-out audience. They are represented by William Morris Agency.

== Biography ==
Fowler and File met at Rancho de la Luna studios in Joshua Tree, California. File had joined U.N.K.L.E after DJ Shadow's departure. The pair began writing and recording music soon after, when File met Fowler at her house in the San Fernando district of Los Angeles. According to Fowler, "We were hanging out talking and there are always a variety of instruments sitting around at my house, Rich picked up a guitar and started playing something I liked, so I picked up my bass and before you knew it we had a song, both singing together, free-flowing creativity. Fifteen minutes later we started another, then minutes after that another – the rest is history".

Dave Okumu and Leo Taylor of The Invisible play drums and guitar on the debut album, released in the UK in 2009. Okumu also co-wrote the debut single "Lights Out".

Tracks by the group have been featured in US dramas:

- "The Double" in Gossip Girl and CSI: NY and The Prisoner
- "Lights Out" In Numb3rs
- "Careful What You Wish For" in CSI: NY

In the winter of 2010, the group composed the theme song to AMC's The Killing from writer, executive producer, and series showrunner, Veena Sud.

== Influences ==
We Fell To Earth profess a mutual appreciation of Krautrock. File said, "We have a mutual appreciation for bands like Can and Faust. The rhythm sections particularly influenced us while making this record, where you have the repetition of dance music but retain the humanity of a rock record. It was the perfect backbone for our evolution. Most of the songs were built around Wendy and I jamming out the rhythm sections".

== Discography ==
=== Albums ===
- We Fell to Earth (2009)

=== Singles and EPs ===
- We Fell to Earth EP (2009)
- "Lights Out"
- "The Double"
- "Deaf"
