= Somebody's Knocking =

Studio album by Mark Lanegan Band
- Released: October 18, 2019
- Length: 56:53
- Label: Heavenly
- Producer: Alain Johannes

Mark Lanegan Band chronology
Gargoyle (2017)	Somebody's Knocking (2019)	Straight Songs of Sorrow (2020)

Somebody's Knocking is the eleventh studio album by American singer Mark Lanegan (credited to "Mark Lanegan Band"). It was released through Heavenly Recordings on October 18, 2019.

== Critical reception ==
Professional ratings
Review scores
Source	Rating
AllMusic	3.5/5 stars
The Guardian	4/5 stars
Sputnikmusic	3.8/5
The Times	4/5 stars
Under the Radar	8/10 stars

The Guardian wrote that the album "is limited to trying to re-create the mood of Manchester in the 1980s ... you can’t help but laugh at the brazenness of it." Clash called it "probably the most cheerful album Lanegan has released under his own name, despite still sounding like Joy Division at their moodiest."

== Track listing ==
All tracks are written by Mark Lanegan, Alain Johannes, Rob Marshall and Sietse van Gorkom except where noted.

No.	Title	Length
1.	"Disbelief Suspension" (Lanegan, Marshall)	3:15
2.	"Letter Never Sent" (Johannes, Lanegan, van Gorkom)	3:31
3.	"Night Flight to Kabul" (Johannes, Lanegan, van Gorkom)	3:30
4.	"Dark Disco Jag" (Martin Jenkins, Johannes, Lanegan)	3:55
5.	"Gazing from the Shore" (Lanegan, Marshall)	3:42
6.	"Stitch It Up" (Lanegan, van Gorkom)	3:03
7.	"Playing Nero" (Lanegan, van Gorkom)	4:16
8.	"Penthouse High" (Johannes, Lanegan)	6:23
9.	"Paper Hat" (Lanegan, van Gorkom)	4:27
10.	"Name and Number" (Lanegan, Marshall)	3:39
11.	"War Horse" (Lanegan, van Gorkom)	2:51
12.	"Radio Silence" (Lanegan, van Gorkom)	4:02
13.	"She Loved You" (Johannes, Lanegan, Marshall)	5:30
14.	"Two Bells Ringing at Once" (Lanegan, Marshall)	4:49

== Personnel ==
- Mark Lanegan – vocals (1–14)
- Alain Johannes – synths (1–6, 8, 10, 12, 13), melodica (2), guitar (2, 4–6, 10, 12, 13), drum machine (2, 3, 5, 6, 8, 12, 13), saxophone (3, 10), background vocals (3, 6, 8, 9), bass (8, 13), percussion (8)
- Rob Marshall – guitar (1, 5, 10, 13), bass (1, 14), piano (1, 14), drum programming (1, 5, 10, 13, 14), synths (10, 13, 14)
- Sietse van Gorkom – guitar (2, 3, 6, 7, 9, 11, 12), bass (2, 9, 11), drum programming (2, 7, 9, 11), synths (3, 7, 9, 12), noise FX (3), mellotron (9), percussion (9), organ (11)
- Martin Jenkins – synths (4), drum programming (4)
- Martyn LeNoble – bass (3, 5, 6, 10)
- Greg Dulli – guitar (2), background vocals (2)
- Freek Cerutti – bass (7)
- Tom Nieuwenhuijse – drums (3, 6, 11, 12)
- Shelley Brien – background vocals (6, 9)

== Charts ==
Chart (2019)	Peak position
Belgian Albums (Ultratop Flanders)	22
German Albums (Offizielle Top 100)	58
Swiss Albums (Schweizer Hitparade)	30
UK Albums (OCC)	78
US Independent Albums (Billboard)	14

r
