= Gargoyle (album) =

Studio album by Mark Lanegan Band
- Released: April 28, 2017
- Length: 41:11
- Label: Heavenly Recordings
- Producer: Alain Johannes

Mark Lanegan Band chronology
Houston Publishing Demos 2002 (2015)	Gargoyle (2017)	Somebody's Knocking (2019)

Professional ratings
Aggregate scores
Source	Rating
AnyDecentMusic?	7.5/10
Metacritic	83/100
Review scores
Source	Rating
AllMusic	4/5 stars
Clash	7/10
The Guardian	4/5 stars
The Independent	4/5 stars
Mojo	5/5 stars
The Observer	5/5 stars
Pitchfork	6.3/10
Q	4/5 stars
Record Collector	4/5 stars
Uncut	8/10

Gargoyle is the tenth studio album by American singer Mark Lanegan (credited to "Mark Lanegan Band"). It was released in April 2017 on Heavenly Recordings. It was produced by Lanegan's long-time collaborator Alain Johannes. Roughly half of the music on the record was written by UK-based Rob Marshall through e-mail exchanges with Lanegan, who would write lyrics subsequently.

While retaining much of the tenebrous imagery of previous records, Gargoyle arguably marks a step toward somewhat a lighter sound, as noted by reviewer Kieron Tyler: "Everything expected is present and correct: the bottom-of-the-boots voice; lugubrious yet affecting melodies; an ominous mood; lyrics dwelling on life’s dark corners. Even so, Gargoyle is an uplifting album, one allowing the sun to peak from behind a cloud."

== Track listing ==
All tracks are written by Mark Lanegan, Alain Johannes and Rob Marshall except where noted.

No.	Title	Length
1.	"Death's Head Tattoo"	4:20
2.	"Nocturne" (Lanegan, Marshall)	4:22
3.	"Blue Blue Sea" (Johannes, Lanegan)	3:24
4.	"Beehive" (Lanegan, Marshall)	3:49
5.	"Sister" (Johannes, Lanegan)	5:03
6.	"Emperor" (Johannes, Lanegan)	3:36
7.	"Goodbye to Beauty" (Lanegan, Marshall)	3:15
8.	"Drunk on Destruction" (Lanegan, Marshall)	3:25
9.	"First Day of Winter" (Johannes, Lanegan)	3:27
10.	"Old Swan" (Lanegan, Marshall)	6:30

== Personnel ==
- Mark Lanegan – vocals (1–10)
- Alain Johannes – verb guitar (1), bass (1,6,9), Prophet 5 (1,2,3,5,9), harmonium (2,3), Moog (2,3), Mellotron (2,3,5,9), B-3 (5,6), tremolo guitar (5,9), shaman drum (5), guitar (6), Farfisa (6), harpsichord (6), percussion (6), E-Bow (9), backing vocals (9), drum programming (9)
- Rob Marshall – bass (1,2,4,10), guitar (1,2,4,8,10), synthesizer (1,10), drum programming (1,4,8,10), drum loops (2,8), acoustic guitar (7), electric guitar (7), drums (7), piano (7), horns (10)
- Greg Dulli – backing vocals (1), acoustic guitar (4), Moog (4)
- Duke Garwood – horns (5), guitar (5)
- Martyn LeNoble – bass (2,4,7,8), melody bass (2)
- Frederic Lyenn Jacques – bass (5)
- Jean-Philippe de Gheest – drums (5)
- Jack Irons – drums (2,4,6,8)
- Aldo Struyf – piano (2,3), ARP (2,3,9), percussion (2,3,9)
- Shelley Brien – backing vocals (3,5)
- Josh Homme – backing vocals (6)

== Charts ==
Chart	Peak position
Austrian Albums (Ö3 Austria)	71
Belgian Albums (Ultratop Flanders)	8
French Albums (SNEP)	127
Dutch Albums (Album Top 100)	36
Spanish Albums (PROMUSICAE)	63
Belgian Albums (Ultratop Wallonia)	35

== Accolades ==
Publication	Accolade	Year	Rank	Ref.
Gigwise	Top 51 Albums	2017	24	
PopMatters	Top 60 Albums	2017	36	
