= Hey Colossus =

English rock band (e. 2003)

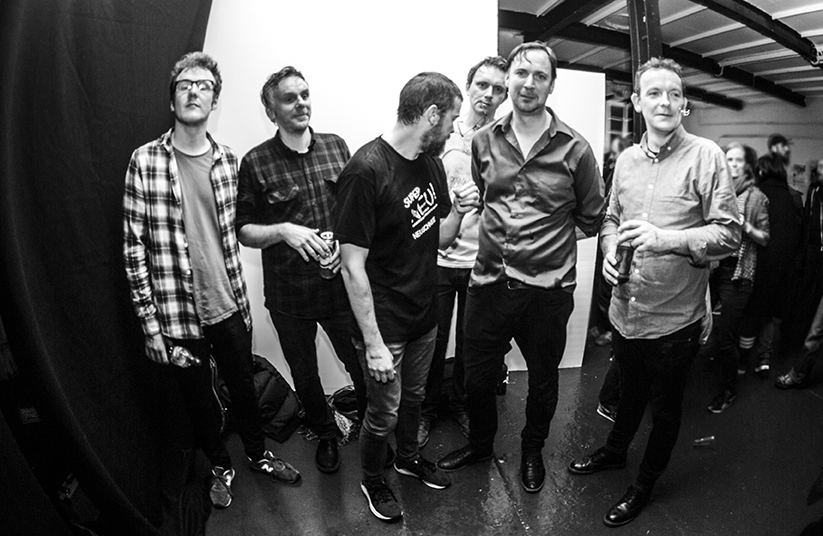
- Hey Colossus post-gig at Centrala, Birmingham, December 2018.

Background information
- Origin: London, England
- Genres: Alternative rock; noise rock; post-punk; psychedelic rock
- Years active: 2003–present
- Members: Tom House; Tim Farthing; Roo Farthing; Joe Thompson; Robert Davis; Chris Summerlin
- Past members: Paul Sykes; Rhys Llewellyn; Will Pearce; Leon Marks; Jonathan Richards; Tim Cedar; Ian Scanlon; Tim Hall; James Parker; Duncan Brown
- Website: heycolossusband.wordpress.com

Hey Colossus are an English rock band formed in London in 2003. Since its inception, the band has undergone several lineup changes, revolving around founding members Joe Thompson and Robert Davis.

The band is characterised by its ‘heavy’ sound, DIY ethic, prolific output, and stylistic experimentation.

== History ==
Hey Colossus was formed by childhood friends Joe Thompson and Robert Davis in 2003, together with Ian Scanlon, Tim Hall and James Parker. Their debut album, Hey Colossus Hates You, was released on the band’s own Jonson Family label in 2004. They have since released a further ten studio albums and various splits, singles and EPs on a number of labels.

By 2008, the lineup had stabilised around Thompson and Davis together with vocalist Paul Sykes, drummer Rhys Llewellyn, and guitarists Jonathan Richards and Tim Farthing. This incarnation would produce some of the band’s most stylistically diverse work.

Following the departure of Richards, Hey Colossus were joined by Tim’s brother Roo Farthing for the 2017 album The Guillotine, their most refined and politicised record to date.

After extensive touring to promote The Guillotine, the Farthing brothers left the band to pursue other projects (Reigns and Henry Blacker). They were replaced by Will Pearce of the Bristol noise rock band Pohl.

In July 2018, Hey Colossus played a 15th anniversary show at the Moth Club in Hackney, London. A limited-edition live album was available to buy on the night.

A twelfth album, titled Four Bibles, was released in May 2019 on ALTER. This was followed the next year by the 75-minute double album Dances/Curses, released on bass player Joe Thompson's Wrong Speed Records in the UK, and Learning Curve in the US. Featuring guest vocals by Mark Lanegan on lead song The Mirror, Dances/Curses was named 2020 Album Of The Year by The Quietus.

== Musical style ==
Hey Colossus’ early output can be classified as sludge metal with elements of noise rock. Each new record has seen the band embrace wider influences while retaining the ‘heavy’ sound that has become their trademark.

Today, the band’s music combines elements of noise rock, post-punk, hardcore punk, sludge metal, drone music, electronic music, psychedelic rock and krautrock.

== Band members ==
- Robert Davis - guitar
- Roo Farthing - drums
- Tim Farthing - guitar
- Chris Summerlin - guitar
- Thomas House - vocals
- Joe Thompson - bass

== Discography ==
=== Albums ===
- Hey Colossus Hates You (2004, 12" LP & CD) - Jonson Family
- Hey Colossus II (2005, 12" LP & CD) - Jonson Family, Shifty Records, Wakusei Records
- Project: Death (2007, 12" LP & CD) - Jonson Family, Shifty Records, Wakusei Records, Rimbaud Records, Underhill Records
- Happy Birthday (2008, CD; 2017, 12" LP) - Riot Season
- Eurogrumble Vol. 1 (2010, 12" LP) - Riot Season
- Dominant Male (2010, 12" LP, CD & cassette) - Clan Destine Records, No Lite
- RRR (2011, 12" LP & CD) - Riot Season
- Cuckoo Live Life Like Cuckoo (2013, 12" LP & CD) - MIE Music
- In Black And Gold (2015, 12" LP, CD & cassette) - Rocket Recordings, Cactus Records
- Radio Static High (2015, 12" LP & CD) - Rocket Recordings
- The Guillotine (2017, 12" LP & CD) - Rocket Recordings
- Live At Magasin4 (2018, 12" LP) - self-released
- Four Bibles (2019, 12" LP & CD) - ALTER
- Dances/Curses (2020, 12" LP & CD) - Wrong Speed Records (UK), Learning Curve (US)
- In Blood (2023, 12" LP & CD) - Wrong Speed Records
- Heaven Was Wild (2026, 12" LP & CD) - Wrong Speed Records
