= Field Songs =

Studio album by Mark Lanegan
- Released: May 8, 2001
- Recorded: 2001
- Studio: Jupiter Studios; Robert Lang (Shoreline, Washington); Sound City (Van Nuys, California)
- Genre: Alternative rock, blues rock
- Length: 42:30
- Label: Sub Pop; Beggars Banquet
- Producer: John Angello, Martin Feveyear

Mark Lanegan chronology
I'll Take Care of You (1999)	Field Songs (2001)	Here Comes That Weird Chill (2003)

Professional ratings
Review scores
Source	Rating
AllMusic	3/5 stars
Alternative Press	3.5/5 stars
NME	8/10 stars
Pitchfork	8/10 stars
Q	4/5 stars
Uncut	4/5 stars

Field Songs is the fifth solo album by Mark Lanegan, released in 2001 on the Beggars Banquet label.

== Recording ==
The two largest instrumental contributors are Mike Johnson and Ben Shepherd, the latter co-writing "Blues for D" with the singer. The album also features Duff McKagan of Velvet Revolver and Guns N' Roses as well as Lanegan's ex-wife, Wendy Rae Fowler. Chris Goss sings on "She Done too Much."

The album represents a departure of sorts for the singer. While retaining the acoustic atmosphere of his previous solo efforts, Field Songs incorporates Middle Eastern influences ("No Easy Action") as well as experimental musical landscapes ("Miracle," "Blues for D") which elicited comparisons from critics to Tom Waits. Lanegan's gravelly, gin-soaked vocals on "Don't Forget Me" and "Fix" is balanced out by his delicate delivery featured on "Kimiko's Dream House" and "Pill Hill Serenade." In his 2017 book I Am the Wolf: Lyrics and Writings, Lanegan says of Field Songs:

I consider the finished album to be one of my best, and it contains some of my favorite songs: "Don't Forget Me," in which I flat-out took the melody and phrasing from an Israeli folk song and was immediately busted for it by fans when it was released; "One Way Street," which has been a constant in my set lists since the day it came out; and "No Easy Action," which I wrote after reading two stories in the newspaper one morning..."Kimiko's Dream House" was a gift from my favorite singer, friend, and mentor Jeffrey Lee Pierce. He gave me the music and half the lyrics and said, "Finish it."

== Reception ==
AllMusic's Sam Samuelson writes, "Upon repeated listens, standout tracks such as 'Miracle,' 'Kimiko's Dream House,' and 'Fix' become infectiously memorable as convincing tales about love gained and lost. All in all, every track is solid and worthy of numerous spins."

== Track listing ==
All tracks are written by Mark Lanegan except where noted.

No.	Title	Length
1.	"One Way Street"	4:18
2.	"No Easy Action" (featuring Wendy Rae Fowler)	4:01
3.	"Miracle"	1:58
4.	"Pill Hill Serenade"	3:27
5.	"Don't Forget Me"	3:13
6.	"Kimiko's Dream House" (Jeffrey Lee Pierce, Lanegan)	5:26
7.	"Resurrection Song"	3:33
8.	"Field Song"	2:19
9.	"Low"	3:13
10.	"Blues for D" (Lanegan, Ben Shepherd)	3:36
11.	"She Done Too Much"	1:28
12.	"Fix" (featuring Duff McKagan)	5:47

== Personnel ==
- Mark Lanegan - guitar, vocals
- John Agnello - recorder, vocals, mastering, mixing (3, 5, 7, 12)
- Mark Boquist - drums (2–5, 8)
- Allen Davis - acoustic guitar (12), bass (10, 12)
- Martin Feveyear - Hammond organ (4, 9, 10), recorder, vocals (6), mastering, mixing (1, 2, 4, 6, 8–11)
- Chris Goss - synthesizer (11), vocals (11)
- Mark Hoyt - vocals (9)
- Mike Johnson - acoustic guitar (1–3, 5–9, 11), electric guitar (1–7, 12), Wurlitzer organ (2), piano (7), backing vocals
- Marek - piano (1)
- Duff McKagan - drums (12), Fender Rhodes (12)
- Wendy Rae Fowler - vocals (2)
- Brett Netson - acoustic guitar (12)
- Keni Richards - piano (5), drums (4, 6), mellotron (2)
- Bill Rieflin - drums (1)
- Ben Shepherd - acoustic guitar (1, 9, 10), electric guitar (1, 2, 4, 6–8, 10), bass (tracks: 1–6, 8, 9, 11), lap steel guitar (2), vocals (6), piano (10)
- Chris Strother - photography
