= I'll Take Care of You (Mark Lanegan album) =

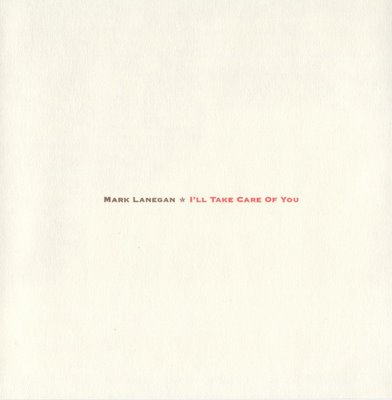

Studio album by Mark Lanegan
- Released: September 21, 1999
- Genre: Alternative rock
- Length: 33:40
- Label: Sub Pop; Beggars Banquet
- Producer: Martin Feveyear

Mark Lanegan chronology
Scraps at Midnight (1998)	I'll Take Care of You (1999)	Field Songs (2001)

Professional ratings
Review scores
Source	Rating
AllMusic	4.5/5 stars
Alternative Press	1/00, pp.90-1
Robert Christgau	(2-star Honorable Mention)
Pitchfork Media	7.5/10
Q	11/99, p.126

I'll Take Care of You is the fourth solo album by former Screaming Trees vocalist Mark Lanegan. This album consists of cover songs.

== Recording ==
The album features Lanegan's interpretation of songs from a wide variety of songwriters, including Tim Rose, Tim Hardin, Booker T. Jones, and Buck Owens. I'll Take Care Of You also includes the traditional song "Little Sadie." A review from NME said: "it's probably his finest, most tenderly-delivered work to date." Pitchfork Media's Neil Lieberman said this about the album: "In this collection, Lanegan's managed to tug on the timeless threads that hold the patchwork of American music together. And that's certainly something to consider." The album opener "Carry Home" was composed by Jeffrey Lee Pierce, with whom Lanegan would write "Kimiko's Dream House," which would appear on his next album Field Songs.

== Reception ==
Steve Huey of AllMusic: "It's a testament to Lanegan's interpretive skill that he's able to use his already well-established style so effectively yet again, as most of these versions range from stunning to merely excellent."

== Track listing ==
No.	Title	Length
1.	"Carry Home" (Jeffrey Lee Pierce)	3:00
2.	"I'll Take Care of You" (Brook Benton)	2:50
3.	"Shiloh Town" (Tim Hardin)	3:22
4.	"Creeping Coastline of Lights" (Leaving Trains)	3:20
5.	"Badi-Da" (Fred Neil)	3:21
6.	"Consider Me" (Eddie Floyd, Booker T. Jones)	3:49
7.	"On Jesus' Program" (Overton Vertis Wright)	2:45
8.	"Little Sadie" (Traditional)	3:23
9.	"Together Again" (Buck Owens)	2:34
10.	"Shanty Man's Life" (Stephen Harrison Paulus)	3:12
11.	"Boogie Boogie" (Tim Rose)	2:04

== Personnel ==
- Mark Lanegan - vocals
- Mike Johnson - guitar
- Steve Berlin - organ, flute, piano
- Mark Boquist - drums
- Van Conner - bass
- Martin Feveyear - organ, percussion, piano, producer, engineer, mixing, Wurlitzer
- Mark Hoyt - acoustic and electric guitar, vocals
- David Krueger - violin
- Barrett Martin - percussion, vibraphone
- Mark Pickerel - drums
- Ben Shepherd - bass

Technical

- Brett Eliason - engineer
- Greg Calbi - mastering
- Jeff Kleinsmith - layout design
- Chris Takino - A&R
- Stanford Wilson - photography
