= Imitations (album) =

Studio album by Mark Lanegan
- Released: September 17, 2013
- Recorded: 2012
- Length: 41:20
- Label: Vagrant, Heavenly
- Producer: Martin Feveyear

Mark Lanegan chronology
Black Pudding (2013)	Imitations (2013)	Phantom Radio (2014)

Singles from Imitations
- 1. "I'm Not the Loving Kind" Released: June 26, 2013

Imitations is the eighth studio album by the American alternative rock musician Mark Lanegan, released on September 17, 2013, on Vagrant Records in the US and Heavenly Recordings in the UK. It is a collection of cover songs, consisting of songs from Lanegan's parents' music collection and contemporary musicians, including Chelsea Wolfe, Nick Cave and the Bad Seeds and The Twilight Singers.

Produced by Martin Feveyear, who had worked with Lanegan on his previous covers album, I'll Take Care of You (1999), the album was preceded by the single, "I'm Not the Loving Kind".

== Background ==
Commenting on the decision to record a covers album, Mark Lanegan said: "when I was a kid in the late sixties and early seventies, my parents and their friends would play the records of Andy Williams, Dean Martin, Frank Sinatra and Perry Como, music with string arrangements and men singing songs that sounded sad whether they were or not. At home my folks were also listening to country music, Willie Nelson, Johnny Cash, George Jones and Vern Gosdin were some of our favorites. For a long time I've wanted to make a record that gave me the same feeling those old records did, using some of the same tunes I loved as a kid and some that I've loved as I have gotten older. This record is it."

== Release ==
Imitations was announced for release on June 26, 2013, through a press release on Lanegan's official website. It was subsequently released on September 17, 2013, on Vagrant Records, with whom he signed after the release of Blues Funeral (2012). The album's lead single, a cover of John Cale's "I'm Not the Loving Kind", was released on SoundCloud alongside the album's announcement.

A nine-date tour of European festivals to support Imitations' release began on July 12, 2013, at BBK Live in Bilbao, Spain and concluded on July 21 at the Longitude Festival in Dublin, Ireland. Tour dates for the United States were later in 2013, according to Imitations' press release.

== Critical reception ==
Professional ratings
Aggregate scores
Source	Rating
Metacritic	(71/100)
Review scores
Source	Rating
Allmusic	3.5/5 stars
The Guardian	3/5 stars
NME	(6/10)
Pitchfork Media	(6.6/10)

Writing for Allmusic, Thom Jurek gave the album a positive review, stating: "Imitations is a fine collection that reveals the depth of the songs through the openness and considerable skill of the singer." In a mostly positive review, The Guardian's Michael Hann wrote: "Imitations works best when Lanegan, his voice as dark and smoky as one of those old-fashioned gentlemen's clubs, tackles something so unexpected it forces you to reappraise the song: "You Only Live Twice", in particular, is a triumph, the grandeur and drama of the Bond replaced by a delicate weariness."

In a mixed review for the NME, Jeremy Allan, wrote: "Up there with Cash's American series this is not. But 48-year-old Lanegan is a classy bastard, so he just about gets away with it."

== Track listing ==
No.	Title	Writer(s)	Artist	Length
1.	"Flatlands"	Chelsea Wolfe	Chelsea Wolfe	3:58
2.	"She's Gone"	Vern Gosdin	Vern Gosdin	2:09
3.	"Deepest Shade"	Greg Dulli	The Twilight Singers	4:03
4.	"You Only Live Twice"	Leslie Bricusse, John Barry	Nancy Sinatra	3:06
5.	"Pretty Colors"	Al Gorgoni, Chip Taylor	Frank Sinatra	2:43
6.	"Brompton Oratory"	Nick Cave	Nick Cave and the Bad Seeds	4:15
7.	"Solitaire"	Neil Sedaka, Phil Cody	Andy Williams	4:55
8.	"Mack the Knife"	Kurt Weill, Bertolt Brecht (English lyric: Manheim-Willett)	Bobby Darin	3:08
9.	"I'm Not the Loving Kind"	John Cale	John Cale	3:08
10.	"Lonely Street"	Carl Belew, Kenny Sowder, W. S. Stevenson	Andy Williams	2:50
11.	"Élégie funèbre"	Gérard Manset	Gérard Manset	3:33
12.	"Autumn Leaves"	Joseph Kosma, Jacques Prévert (English lyric: Johnny Mercer)	Andy Williams	3:32

== Personnel ==
- Mark Lanegan - vocals
- Mike Johnson - acoustic guitar (1, 4), electric guitar (2, 3, 5, 6, 7, 9, 10, 12)
- Alain Johannes - cigfiddle (11), mellotron (11), acoustic guitar (11), ebo guitar (11)
- Barrett Martin - vibraphone (2, 3, 5, 6), tambourine (2), drums (3, 6, 12), percussion (3, 12)
- Bill Rieflin - drums (1, 5, 9), percussion (1, 5, 7), pump organ (6), mellotron (9)
- Duff McKagan - bass (3, 6, 12)
- Mark Pickerel - drums (2, 10)
- Jeff Fielder - acoustic guitar (1, 2, 4), electric guitar (3, 5, 6, 7, 9, 10, 12)
- Drew Church - bass (1, 2, 5, 7, 9, 10)
- Andrew Joslyn - violins (1, 3, 6, 7, 9, 10, 12) viola (1, 6)
- Rebecca Filice - cello (1, 3, 7, 9, 12)
- Mark Hoyt - backing vocals (2), acoustic guitar (8)
- Billy Stover - piano (3, 6, 9, 12)
- Jason Staczek - harpsichord (5)
- Eric Padget - trumpet (6)
- Tom Yoder - trombone (6)
