= Phantom Radio =

Studio album by Mark Lanegan Band
- Released: October 21, 2014
- Genre: Blues; folktronica
- Length: 38:03
- Label: Vagrant
- Producer: Alain Johannes

Mark Lanegan Band chronology
Imitations (2013)	Phantom Radio (2014)	Houston Publishing Demos 2002 (2015)

Phantom Radio is the ninth studio album by alternative rock artist Mark Lanegan, performing as the "Mark Lanegan Band". It was released on October 21, 2014, on Vagrant Records. In an interview with The Quietus, Lanegan stated that he used a phone app called FunkBox to write the drum parts on some of the songs.

Professional ratings
Aggregate scores
Source	Rating
Metacritic	(78/100)
Review scores
Source	Rating
AllMusic	3.5/5 stars
The Guardian	4/5 stars
Pitchfork	(6.7/10)
Consequence of Sound	(C+)
Uncut	(C+)

== Track listing ==
=== Disc 1 ===
All tracks are written by Mark Lanegan.

No.	Title	Length
1.	"Harvest Home"	3:16
2.	"Judgment Time"	2:29
3.	"Floor of the Ocean"	4:52
4.	"The Killing Season"	3:46
5.	"Seventh Day"	4:51
6.	"I Am the Wolf"	3:42
7.	"Torn Red Heart"	4:01
8.	"Waltzing in Blue"	3:14
9.	"The Wild People"	3:06
10.	"Death Trip to Tulsa"	4:46

=== Disc 2 – No Bells on Sunday EP ===
No.	Title	Length
1.	"Dry Iced"	6:22
2.	"No Bells on Sunday"	5:51
3.	"Sad Lover"	3:40
4.	"Jonas Pap"	2:34
5.	"Smokestack Magic"	8:18

== Personnel ==
- Mark Lanegan – vocals (all tracks), acoustic guitar (9)
- Alain Johannes – guitar (1, 10), bass (1, 10), Prophet 5 (1, 3, 4, 7, 8, 10), percussion (1, 4, 5, 8, 10), backing vocals (1, 3, 5, 7), harmonium (2), acoustic guitar (2, 6), verb guitar (3), electric guitar (4, 7, 8), pocket piano (4), Moog bass (5), wah guitar (5), Wurlitzer (5), saxophones (5), flutes (5), filter Moog (5), Brushverb guitar (6), E-bow guitar (6), kick drum (7), tambourine (7), Mellotron (8), electronic drums (8), Rhodes (10)
- Martyn LeNoble – bass (3, 8), fretless bass (7), upright bass (9)
- Jack Irons – drums (1)
- Aldo Struyf – synthesizer (3, 5, 8, 10), ARP synthesizer (3, 7), electric guitar (3, 5, 7), percussion (3), synthetic horns (7), sampled horns (10)
- Sietse van Gorkom – synthesizer (4), bass (4), saloon piano (4), acoustic guitar (4), strings (4, 9), clarinet (4), electronic drums (4)
- Shelley Brien – backing vocals (3, 5, 8)
- Jean-Philippe de Gheest – drums (9, 10)
- Jeff Fielder – acoustic guitar (9), Leslie guitar (9)
- Brett Nelson – end solo guitar (7)

== Charts ==
=== Weekly charts ===
Chart (2014)	Peak position
Belgian Albums (Ultratop Flanders)	16
Belgian Albums (Ultratop Wallonia)	78
Dutch Albums (Album Top 100)	53
French Albums (SNEP)	131
Irish Albums (IRMA)	27
Scottish Albums (OCC)	18
Swiss Albums (Schweizer Hitparade)	91
UK Albums (OCC)	22

=== Year-end charts ===
Chart (2014)	Position
Belgian Albums (Ultratop Flanders)	193
