= Whiskey for the Holy Ghost =

Studio album by Mark Lanegan
- Released: January 18, 1994
- Recorded: 1991–1993
- Studio: Ironwood (Seattle, Washington); Reciprocal (Seattle, Washington); Steve Lawson Productions (Seattle, Washington); Messina Music (New York City)
- Genre: Country blues
- Length: 49:22
- Label: Sub Pop
- Producer: Mike Johnson, Mark Lanegan

Mark Lanegan chronology
The Winding Sheet (1990)	Whiskey for the Holy Ghost (1994)	Scraps at Midnight (1998)

Singles from Whiskey for the Holy Ghost
- 1. "House a Home" Released: 1994

Whiskey for the Holy Ghost is the second solo album by former Screaming Trees vocalist Mark Lanegan. The album builds upon the roots music foundation that Lanegan had established with his debut The Winding Sheet.

== Recording ==
The recording was reportedly a frustrating affair for Lanegan; at one point the singer had to be physically prevented from throwing the master tapes into a river by producer Jack Endino. Recording sessions that began in 1991 were thwarted when the check Sub Pop wrote to the studio bounced. In his 2017 book I Am the Wolf: Lyrics and Writings, the singer recalls:

From the time I began writing the songs until the record was done, Screaming Trees also wrote and recorded an album and did much touring, so I was compelled to work on my own record in the off-time. A week here, a month there – and what I had originally intended to be a quick recording experience stretched out over four years. Many different musicians, engineers, producers, and studios were burned through, and my behavior became erratic, not easy to deal with as I continually rewrote, re-recorded, and mixed tunes according to an internal, chemically cracked sensibility that sometimes verged on paranoia.

In an interview on WTF with Marc Maron, Lanegan highlighted the making of Whiskey for the Holy Ghost as an instance in his life where his drug use had a positive effect artistically: "Around the time I did my second solo record I decided to smoke weed, and it made me do some stuff that I never had thought about doing – but of course it turned on me, like all drugs." Lyrically, Lanegan continues to delve into the darker side of the human experience on songs like "Borracho" and the Biblical "Pendulum." ("Jesus Christ been here and gone, what a painful price to pay.") In his book I Am the Wolf, Lanegan states that Van Morrison and writer Cormac McCarthy sparked his imagination for the imagery on the album, with Morrison being a direct influence on "Carnival," and admits that "Pendulum" started "as a joke designed to make my musical partner Mike Johnson laugh."

Dan Peters of Mudhoney plays drums on "Borracho" and "House A Home." "House A Home" was released as a single with an accompanying video. "The River Rise" was used in the 1996 grunge documentary Hype!, where it accompanied a montage filmed at the vigil following Kurt Cobain's death.

== Reception ==
Professional ratings
Review scores
Source	Rating
AllMusic	4.5/5 stars
Entertainment Weekly	A−
NME	7/10
The Philadelphia Inquirer	4/4 stars
Q	4/5 stars
Rolling Stone	4/5 stars
The Rolling Stone Album Guide	4/5 stars
Spin Alternative Record Guide	8/10

Mark Deming of AllMusic writes, "The songs are more literate and better realized than on the debut, the arrangements are subtle and supportive (often eschewing electric guitars for keyboards and acoustic instruments), and Lanegan's voice, bathed in bourbon and nicotine, transforms the deep sorrow of the country blues (a clear inspiration for this music) into something new, compelling, and entirely his own."

== Track listing ==
All tracks are written by Mark Lanegan.

No.	Title	Length
1.	"The River Rise"	4:29
2.	"Borracho"	5:40
3.	"House a Home"	3:07
4.	"Kingdoms of Rain"	3:24
5.	"Carnival"	3:40
6.	"Riding the Nightingale"	6:17
7.	"El Sol"	3:42
8.	"Dead on You"	3:11
9.	"Shooting Gallery"	3:32
10.	"Sunrise"	2:55
11.	"Pendulum"	2:12
12.	"Judas Touch"	1:37
13.	"Beggar's Blues"	5:36

== Personnel ==
- Mark Lanegan – vocals, acoustic and electric guitars
- Mike Johnson – bass, acoustic, electric and slide guitars, organ, piano, harmonica, backing vocals
- Frank Cody – piano, organ
- Ted Trewhella – piano
- Justin Williams – organ
- Kurt Fedora – bass
- Phil Sparks – bowed and upright bass
- Dave Krueger – violin
- Mike Stinette – saxophone
- Tad Doyle, J Mascis, Dan Peters, Mark Pickerel – drums
- Krisha Augerot, Sally Barry – backing vocals

=== Technical personnel ===
- Produced by Mark Lanegan and Mike Johnson
- Recorded by John Agnello, Terry Date, Ed Brooks and Jack Endino
- Mixed by John Agnello
- Mastered by Bob Ludwig
