= Mike Johnson (bassist) =

- Born: August 27, 1965 (age 60); Grants Pass, Oregon, United States
- Genres: Indie rock; sadcore; country
- Occupations: Musician; singer; songwriter
- Instruments: Guitar; vocals; bass; piano
- Years active: 1984–present
- Labels: Up

Mike Johnson (born August 27, 1965) is an American singer-songwriter, guitarist, producer and bass guitarist. He was born in Grants Pass, Oregon and fronted Eugene, Oregon punk band Snakepit from 1984 until their break up in 1989. He joined Dinosaur Jr. as bass player in 1991 and played with the band live and on its recordings from 1991 to 1998. He was briefly married to Juned's Leslie Hardy in 1994, and contributed to both the band's studio albums. He collaborated with Mark Lanegan on his first five solo albums, playing guitar, co-producing, and writing music. In 1994, he released his first solo album, Where Am I, on Up Records, and he continued a solo career, alongside involvement with the bands Queens of the Stone Age and Caustic Resin up until 2006's Gone Out of Your Mind, when he moved to France with his wife.

== Discography ==
Solo

- Where Am I (1994)
- Year of Mondays (1996)
- I Feel Alright (1998)
- What Would You Do (2002)
- Gone Out of Your Mind (2006)

With Dinosaur Jr

- Where You Been (1993)
- Without a Sound (1994)
- Hand It Over (1997)

With Mark Lanegan

- The Winding Sheet (1990)
- Whiskey for the Holy Ghost (1994)
- Scraps at Midnight (1998)
- I'll Take Care of You (1999)
- Field Songs (2001)
- Imitations (2013)
