= The Winding Sheet =

Studio album by Mark Lanegan
- Released: 1990
- Recorded: August–December 1989
- Studio: Reciprocal (Seattle)
- Genres: Alternative rock; blues rock; indie rock; grunge
- Length: 40:18
- Label: Sub Pop
- Producers: Jack Endino, Mike Johnson, Mark Lanegan

Mark Lanegan chronology
The Winding Sheet (1990)	Whiskey for the Holy Ghost (1994)

The Winding Sheet is the debut studio album by alternative rock artist Mark Lanegan. It was released in 1990 on Sub Pop. The album was Lanegan's first solo work, and is notable in its departure from the characteristic sound of Screaming Trees, the band he fronted from 1985 until 2000.

== Background ==
While the work done in the Screaming Trees was much more energetic and fit into the burgeoning grunge genre of the late 80s/early 90s, The Winding Sheet has a much more stripped-down sound, defining Lanegan's solo work largely for the rest of the decade. As Lanegan recounts in his 2017 book I Am the Wolf: Lyric and Writings, "Prior to this I had sometimes written words with the other members of my first band, or, more often, had tried to change their lyrics to fit me in a more personal way. This was a tedious, frustrating routine that was never enjoyable, and so The Winding Sheet became my first attempt at going it alone."

Notable music photographer Charles Peterson shot the cover image of Lanegan. During the selection of the album's cover art, Lanegan specifically demanded that a different photo of himself be used on the cover, stating that the label's preferred shot seemed "pretentious". When the album shipped without the cover art being changed per the agreement between him and Sub Pop co-owner Bruce Pavitt, Lanegan stormed into Pavitt's office at Sub Pop, berating him and threatening him with legal action and various acts of violence, and threatened to have the albums pulled from store shelves.

== Recording ==
The album was produced by Mike Johnson, who also co-wrote many of the songs, and Jack Endino. In I Am the Wolf: Lyrics and Writings, Lanegan recalls Endino "constantly assuring me that what we were doing was not terrible" and notes that the songs were "born of sadness and uncertainty with my circumstances at the time: relationships, money problems, alcohol, depression, addiction, and so on." On "Down in the Dark", Lanegan's friend Kurt Cobain sings, while on a cover version of Leadbelly's "Where Did You Sleep Last Night", Cobain contributes guitar and Krist Novoselic plays bass. Nirvana would later also cover "Where Did You Sleep Last Night" on their Unplugged album. Foo Fighters' frontman and former Nirvana drummer Dave Grohl has called The Winding Sheet "one of the best albums of all time" and has said that it was a huge influence on Nirvana's 1993 MTV Unplugged concert.

== Critical reception ==
Professional ratings
Review scores
Source	Rating
AllMusic	3/5 stars
Q	4/5 stars
The Rolling Stone Album Guide	3/5 stars
Spin Alternative Record Guide	8/10

The Seattle Times opined that "the album elevates Lanegan to the status of one of the Northwest's most intriguing and promising rock artists." Trouser Press called it "marvelous" and "moody and ominous".

== Track listing ==
All tracks are written by Mark Lanegan and Mike Johnson except where noted.

No.	Title	Length
1.	"Mockingbirds"	2:29
2.	"Museum"	2:50
3.	"Undertow"	2:52
4.	"Ugly Sunday"	3:56
5.	"Down in the Dark"	3:21
6.	"Wild Flowers" (Lanegan)	2:59
7.	"Eyes of a Child"	4:00
8.	"The Winding Sheet"	5:30
9.	"Woe" (Lanegan)	2:04
10.	"Ten Feet Tall"	2:49
11.	"Where Did You Sleep Last Night" (Traditional)	3:59
12.	"Juarez" (Lanegan, Steve Fisk)	1:21
13.	"I Love You Little Girl" (Lanegan)	2:02

== Personnel ==
- Mark Lanegan – lead vocals, acoustic guitar (6, 9, 13)
- Kurt Cobain – electric guitar (11), backing vocals (5)
- Krist Novoselic – bass (11)
- Jack Endino – bass (1, 3–5, 10), second electric guitar (5)
- Mike Johnson – acoustic guitar (1–4, 7–8, 10), electric guitar (1, 3–5, 8, 10)
- Mark Pickerel – drums (1, 3–5, 11)
- Steve Fisk – organ (8, 12), piano (1, 4)
- Justin Williams – violin (3, 7)
