= Mark Lanegan =

American singer and songwriter (1964–2022)

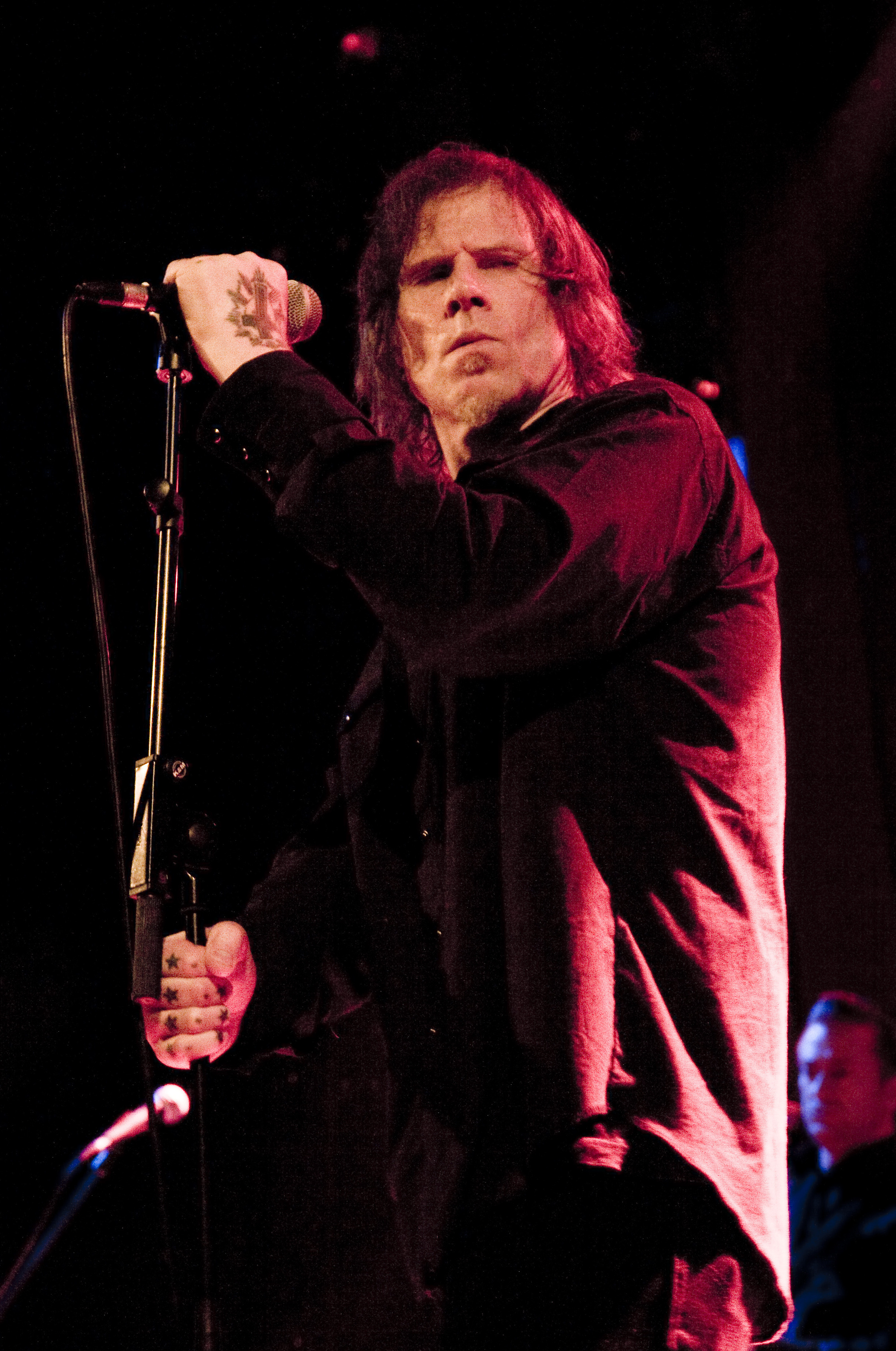
- Lanegan performing in 2012

Background information
- Also known as: Dark Mark
- Born: Mark William Lanegan; November 25, 1964; Ellensburg, Washington, U.S.
- Origin: Seattle, Washington, U.S.
- Died: February 22, 2022 (aged 57) Killarney, Ireland
- Genres: Alternative rock; indie rock; stoner rock; hard rock; grunge; folk rock; blues rock
- Occupations: Singer; songwriter
- Instruments: Vocals; guitar; keyboards
- Years active: 1984–2022
- Labels: Sub Pop; Beggars Banquet; 4AD
- Formerly of: Screaming Trees; Queens of the Stone Age; The Gutter Twins; Mad Season
- Website: marklanegan.com

Mark William Lanegan (November 25, 1964 – February 22, 2022) was an American singer and songwriter. First becoming prominent as the lead singer for the early grunge band Screaming Trees, he was also known as a member of Queens of the Stone Age and The Gutter Twins. He released twelve solo studio albums as well as three collaboration albums with Isobel Campbell and two with Duke Garwood. He was known for his baritone voice, which was described as being "as scratchy as a three-day beard yet as supple and pliable as moccasin leather" and has been compared to Tom Waits, Leonard Cohen and Nick Cave.

Lanegan began his musical career in 1984 in Screaming Trees, with whom he released seven studio albums and five EPs before their disbandment in 2000. During his time with the band, he also began a solo career and released his first solo studio album, The Winding Sheet, in 1990. He then released 10 more solo albums, which received critical recognition but only moderate commercial success. Following the end of Screaming Trees, he became a frequent collaborator of Queens of the Stone Age and was a full-time member between 2001 and 2005 during the Songs for the Deaf and Lullabies to Paralyze eras.

Lanegan collaborated with various artists during his career. In the 1990s, he and Kurt Cobain recorded an album of Lead Belly covers that was ultimately never released. He also joined Layne Staley and Mike McCready in the band Mad Season, and formed the alternative rock group The Gutter Twins with Greg Dulli in 2003, as well as contributing to releases by Moby, Bomb the Bass, Soulsavers, Tinariwen, The Twilight Singers, Manic Street Preachers, and Unkle, among others.

Lanegan struggled with addiction to drugs and alcohol throughout his life but had been sober for over a decade at the time of his death. Encouraged by his friend Anthony Bourdain, he released the memoir Sing Backwards and Weep in 2020. He followed this up in 2021 with the memoir Devil in a Coma, which focused on his near-death experience with COVID-19. He and his wife Shelley Brien left the U.S. in 2020 and settled in the Irish town of Killarney, where he died two years later at the age of 57. No cause of death was revealed.

== Early life ==
Mark William Lanegan was born in Ellensburg, Washington on November 25, 1964. During an interview with The Rocket in 1996, he said that he drove a combine harvester when he was younger. He was of Irish, Scottish and Welsh descent. He said that he developed an alcohol use disorder by age 12 and began using drugs heavily by the age of 18, having already been arrested and sentenced to one year's imprisonment for drug-related crimes.

== Musical career ==
=== Screaming Trees (1984–2000) ===
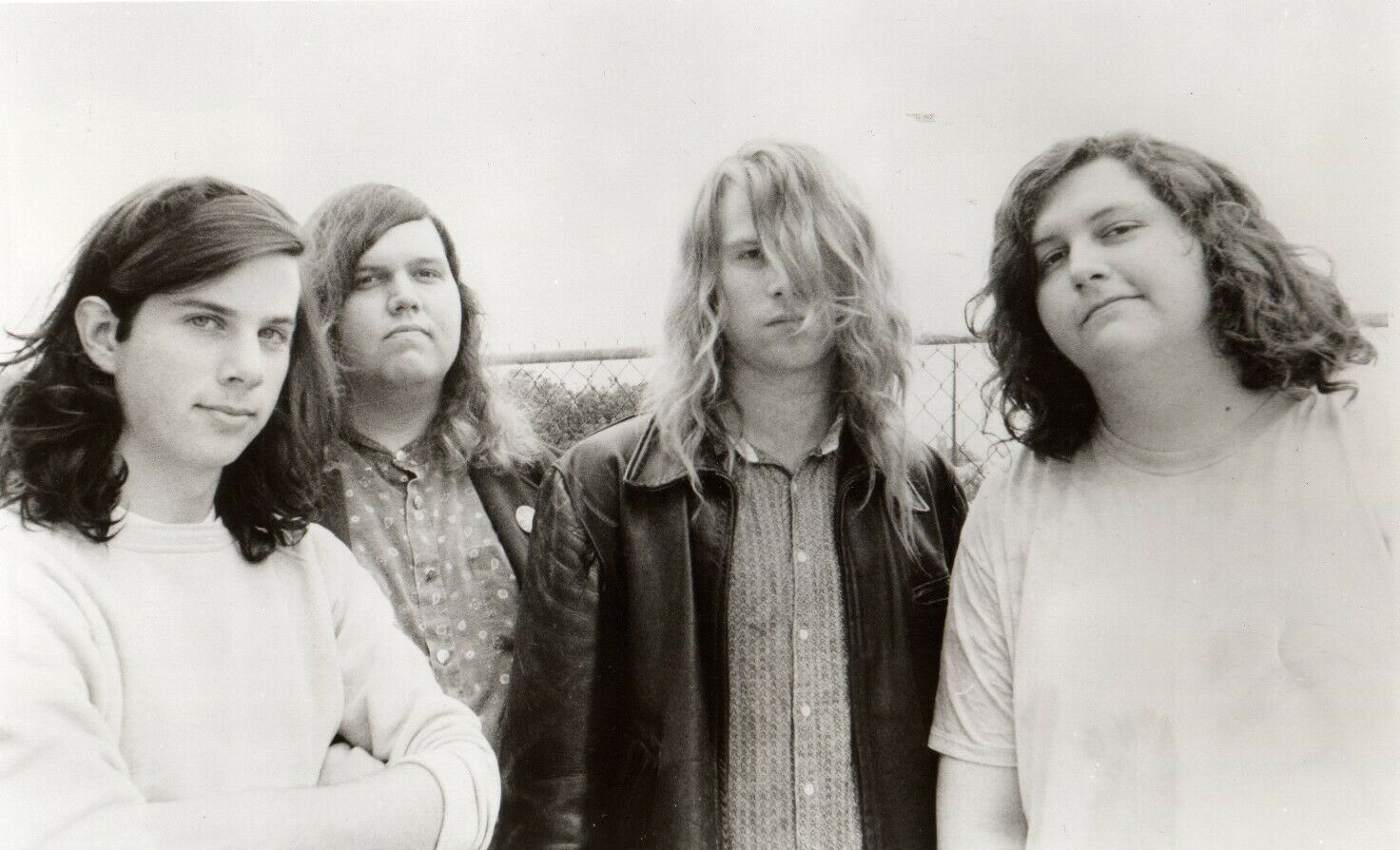
Lanegan (middle right) with Screaming Trees in the 1980s

Screaming Trees was formed in late 1984 by Lanegan, guitarist Gary Lee Conner, bassist Van Conner, and drummer Mark Pickerel. Along with Alice in Chains, Pearl Jam, Soundgarden, Mudhoney, The Melvins, and Nirvana, Screaming Trees were part of Seattle's emerging grunge scene in the early 1990s. Pickerel would later be replaced with Barrett Martin. Lanegan originally joined as the drummer but later said, "I was such a shitty drummer that they made me sing." The band released the Other Worlds EP in 1986; recorded in 1985 and originally available only on cassette tape, the album was re-released on CD and LP by SST Records in 1987. Although the band was being courted by major labels, they signed to Velvetone Records in 1985 and released their debut album, Clairvoyance, in 1986. The album was a combination of psychedelic music and hard rock, and bears many similarities to early grunge.

In 1987, the band released their second effort, and their first for SST Records, Even If and Especially When. After the release of the album in 1987 the band began working on the American indie circuit, playing shows across the United States. Their follow up album Invisible Lantern was released in 1988. 1989's Buzz Factory was the fourth full-length album by Screaming Trees and their final record released through SST.

In 1991, the band released their fifth effort, and their first for a major label. Uncle Anesthesia was released in 1991 and was produced by Soundgarden vocalist Chris Cornell. Uncle Anesthesia included the single "Bed of Roses", which gained considerable airtime on alternative rock radio stations. The song peaked at number 23 on the Modern Rock Tracks and was the first Screaming Trees release to chart. Barrett Martin replaced previous drummer Pickerel and the new line up recorded Sweet Oblivion in 1992.

Sweet Oblivion was the band's breakout album and included the singles "Nearly Lost You", "Dollar Bill", "Shadow of the Season", and "Butterfly". The first two singles gained considerable airtime on alternative rock radio stations, while the video for "Nearly Lost You" became an MTV and alternative radio hit in the fall of 1992, thanks to the momentum of the soundtrack of the film Singles, which features the song. "Nearly Lost You" peaked at number 5 on the Modern Rock Tracks and number 50 in the United Kingdom and was the band's first single to chart outside the United States. Sweet Oblivion sold a total of 300,000 copies in the United States.

After a hiatus brought about by in-fighting and uncertainty over the quality of the music they were recording, the band's final album, Dust, was released in 1996. The album spawned several singles, including "All I Know" and "Dying Days", and peaked at number 134 on the Billboard 200. Reaching number 39 on the Canadian album chart, it was the only Screaming Trees album to chart outside the United States. Despite consistently favorable reviews, the album did not match the commercial success of Sweet Oblivion. Following the Dust tour in the United States, Screaming Trees took another hiatus for Lanegan to begin his work on his third solo album, Scraps at Midnight. The band headed back into the studio in 1999 and recorded several demos and shopped them around to labels, but no label was willing to take them on. The band played a few surprise shows in early 2000, and then following a concert to celebrate the opening of Seattle's Experience Music Project they unexpectedly announced their official breakup.

When asked in 2021 about the '90s grunge movement, Lanegan commented, "It's not something that was contrived or cooked up around the campfire somewhere. It just happened organically. It's hard for me to comment, because there's always great new music and there probably always will be — as long as the sun keeps shining."

=== Solo work and other projects ===
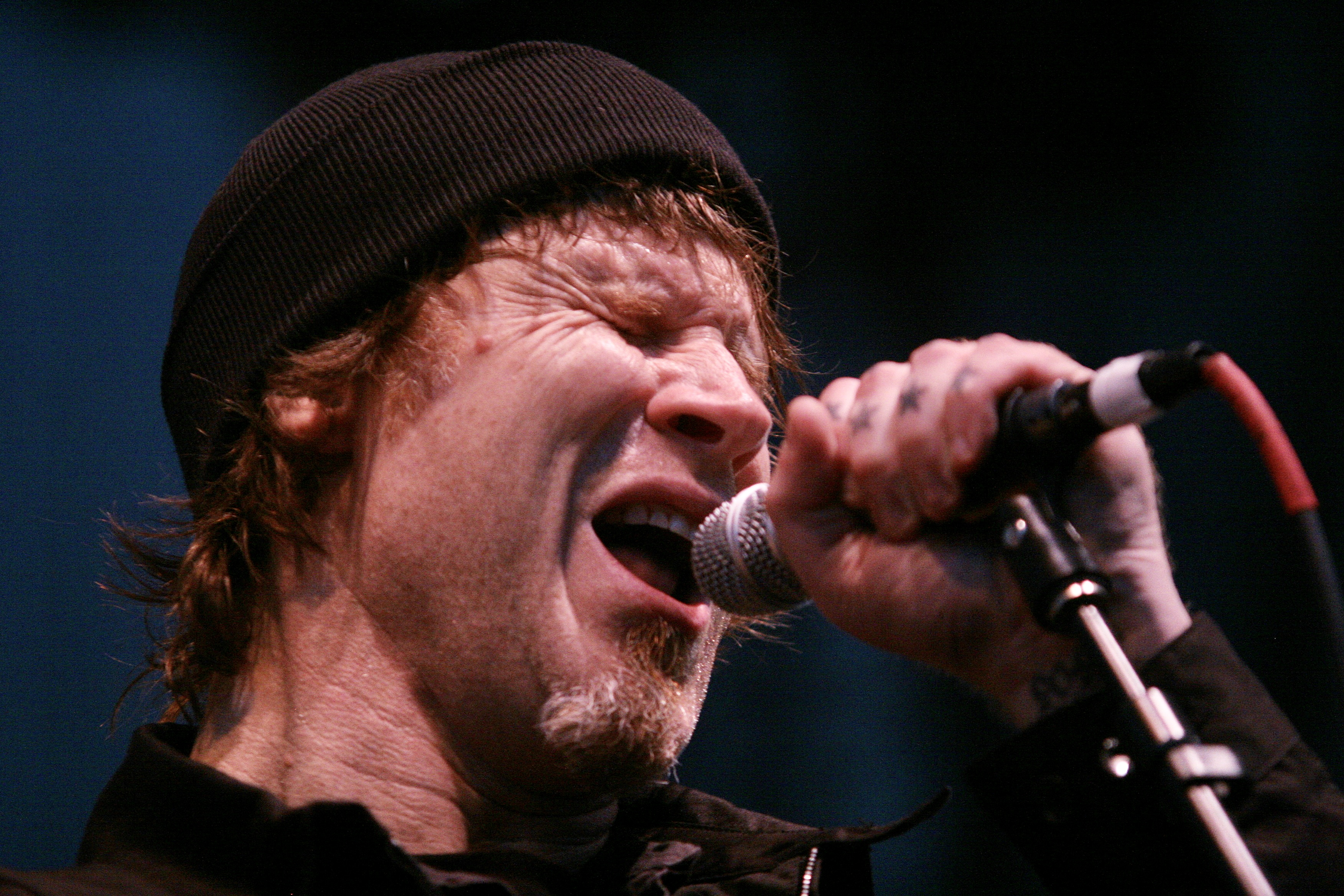
Lanegan in 2009

In 1990, Lanegan released his first solo album, The Winding Sheet via label Sub Pop. Lanegan had intimated that the album came around following a Leadbelly project he was working on with Mark Pickerel, Kurt Cobain, and Krist Novoselic. The project was short lived and eventually other musicians became involved in the evolution to the debut solo record. From the Leadbelly sessions a version of "Where Did You Sleep Last Night?" appeared on The Winding Sheet. "Ain't It a Shame" is available on the Nirvana box set, With the Lights Out. Cobain also supplied backing vocals on "Down in the Dark" on Lanegan's debut. The majority of the album was recorded with Pickerel on drums, Mike Johnson on guitar, Steve Fisk on piano and organ, and Jack Endino on bass.

His second solo record, 1994's Whiskey for the Holy Ghost, was a more cohesive recording, with songs "The River Rise", "Kingdoms of Rain", "Riding the Nightingale", and "Beggar's Blues". Taking nearly three years to make, the album came close to not seeing the light of day as Lanegan was set to throw the master tapes in a pond outside of the recording studio, only to be stopped by producer Jack Endino at the last moment.

In 1995, Lanegan appeared on the album Above by Mad Season. The project was fronted by friend Layne Staley (Alice in Chains) and was formed in late 1994 by Staley, Mike McCready of Pearl Jam, Barrett Martin of Screaming Trees, and John Baker Saunders of The Walkabouts. Lanegan co-wrote and sang co-lead on "Long Gone Day" and "I'm Above". Lanegan also appeared on stage at Mad Season's concerts to perform the songs. After Staley's departure from the band, Mad Season began work on a potential second album featuring Lanegan as the primary vocalist. Three of these previously unreleased songs featuring Lanegan were eventually made available on the 2013 deluxe re-release of Above.

In 1998, Scraps at Midnight was released. The album was recorded the previous winter at Rancho de la Luna in Joshua Tree, California, and produced by long-time friend and collaborator Mike Johnson. and featured Rancho de la Luna owners Fred Drake and Dave Catching

Lanegan's fourth studio album was released in 1999. The album began life as B-Sides for singles from Scraps at Midnight (two tracks from the sessions appear on the single "Hotel"). Liking the way the sessions were shaping up, a few more were added and the recording was entitled I'll Take Care of You. The album features covers of songs by prominent folk, R&B and punk artists such as Tim Hardin, Booker T. and the MGs, and country icon Buck Owens, as well as friend Jeffrey Lee Pierce of Gun Club. Lanegan stated that Jeffrey Lee Pierce was one of his early musical heroes and got him interested in making music. Also in 1999, Lanegan participated in the tribute album for Moby Grape co-founder, Skip Spence, who was terminally ill. The album is composed of cover versions of songs from Spence's only solo album, Oar (Columbia, 1969). Lanegan contributed his version of Spence's "Cripple Creek". Lanegan collaborator Greg Dulli also participated in the tribute, contributing his version of Spence's "Dixie Peach Promenade (Yin For Yang)".

In 2001, he released his fifth studio album, Field Songs. The album featured friend Duff McKagan, as well as major contributions from Soundgarden's bassist, Ben Shepherd. 2003 saw him appear on Greg Dulli's The Twilight Singers record Blackberry Belle, sharing lead vocal duties on the epic closing track, "Number Nine". This would be the first of many collaborations with Dulli and The Twilight Singers.

Prior to releasing his fourth album, Mark Lanegan released the EP Here Comes That Weird Chill, which included "Methamphetamine Blues" (later to appear on Bubblegum) as well as a number of B-sides and rarities (including a cover of Captain Beefheart's "Clear Spot") featuring collaborations with many who would feature on Bubblegum, such as Josh Homme, Dean Ween, Nick Oliveri and Chris Goss, as well as (notably) Natasha Shneider, Greg Dulli and Aldo Struyf.

On his next solo album, Bubblegum (2004), Lanegan was joined by a cadre of prominent artists, including P. J. Harvey, Josh Homme and Nick Oliveri of Queens of the Stone Age, Greg Dulli of The Afghan Whigs and Twilight Singers, Dave Catching of Rancho de la Luna , Dean Ween of Ween, and Duff McKagan and Izzy Stradlin, previously of Guns N' Roses. Also appearing on Bubblegum is Lanegan's ex-wife, Wendy Rae Fowler now in We Fell to Earth. The favorably reviewed album was his most commercially successful to date, reaching number 39 on Billboard's Top Independent Albums chart. Some would assume this is due to the appearance of several prominent musical figures, although the album did receive glowing review by critics. In 2013, the track "Strange Religion" was used in season 6 of the Showtime television series Californication.

In 2009 Lanegan sang lead vocals on "The Last Time," an A side track on The Breeders' EP Fate to Fatal.

Lanegan's seventh solo album, Blues Funeral, was released in February 2012. Josh Homme, Dave Catching, Alain Johannes, and Martyn LeNoble contributed to the creation of the album. In November 2012 Lanegan self-released a Christmas album titled Dark Mark Does Christmas 2012, including a Roky Erickson cover "Burn the Flames". The limited six-track EP had only been available at his concerts.

Released on Heavenly Recordings in 2013, Lanegan released his first collaboration with Duke Garwood entitled Black Pudding. It featured a largely acoustic guitar-driven sound, not unlike his first solo albums on Sub Pop, as well as long-time solo collaborator Alain Johannes.

Lanegan released a five-track EP entitled No Bells on Sunday in the United States on July 29, 2014, followed by a European release on August 25. A music video was released on July 15 for "Sad Lover", the third track off the EP. Lanegan's next full-length album, Phantom Radio, was released on October 21, 2014. It was produced by Alain Johannes and has a similar sound aesthetic to Blues Funeral.

Lanegan's second collaborative album with Duke Garwood, With Animals, was released on August 24, 2018. The pair toured Europe in October 2018 to support the release.

Lanegan released three further solo albums between 2017 and 2020 on Heavenly Recordings; Gargoyle in 2017, Somebody's Knocking in April 2019, and Straight Songs of Sorrow in May 2020.

=== Queens of the Stone Age (2000–2014) ===
Lanegan's first appearance on a Queens of the Stone Age album was on Rated R. He sang the lead vocals on "In the Fade" and background vocals on "Leg of Lamb", "Autopilot", and "I Think I Lost My Headache". Rated R became a commercial success and became the first Queens of the Stone Age album to chart.

Shortly after the release of Field Songs, Lanegan became a full-time member of Queens of the Stone Age. He appeared on the 2002 release Songs for the Deaf, singing lead on the tracks "Song for the Dead", "Hangin' Tree", "Song for the Deaf", and "God Is in the Radio". The album became the band's big breakthrough and peaked at number 17 on the Billboard 200 and was certified gold by the RIAA. He also toured in support of the album over the next two years. Lanegan toured full-time as a third vocalist for Queens of the Stone Age in support of Songs for the Deaf, joining his friend Joshua Homme, who supported the Screaming Trees as their touring guitarist in 1996. The album received two Best Hard Rock Performance Grammy nominations for the singles "No One Knows" (2003) and "Go with the Flow" (2004).

In 2005, Lanegan released his last album with Queens of the Stone Age, Lullabies to Paralyze, where he sang lead vocals on the first track of the album called "This Lullaby". The album was delayed during 2004 because of some changes to the line-up: bassist Nick Oliveri was fired and Lanegan went on tour to support Bubblegum. Lanegan would later appear in support of the album.

Lanegan continued to collaborate with Queens of the Stone Age and its members after leaving the band. In 2007, he appeared on their album, Era Vulgaris, contributing background vocals to the track "River in the Road". On August 12, 2010, Lanegan re-joined Queens of The Stone Age on stage at the Nokia Club in Los Angeles, where he sang four encore songs with the band. The concert was put together to raise funds for Eagles of Death Metal bassist Brian O'Connor, who was diagnosed with cancer a few months prior to the event. In 2013, Lanegan appeared on their sixth album, ...Like Clockwork, co-writing the song "Fairweather Friends" and contributing background vocals to the track "If I Had a Tail".

=== Collaboration with Isobel Campbell (2004–2011) ===
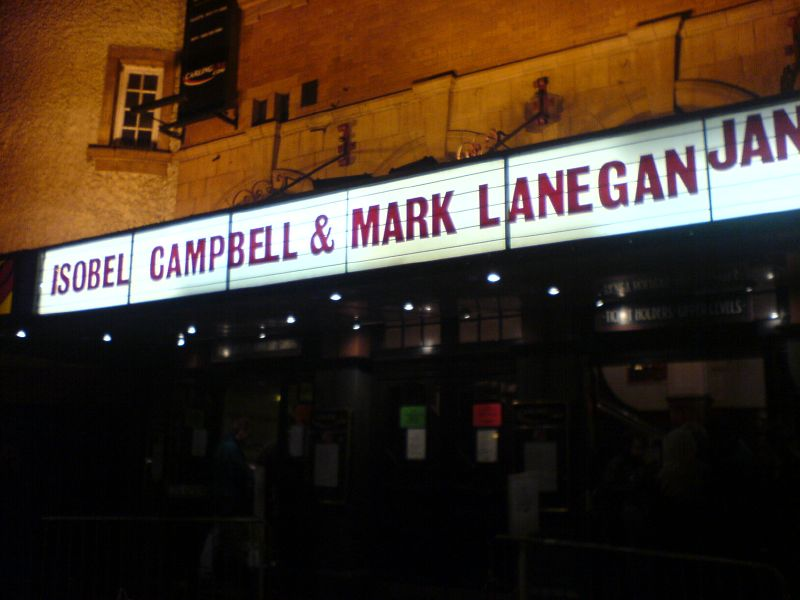
Lanegan toured with Isobel Campbell in 2007 in support of their album Ballad of the Broken Seas.

In April 2004, Lanegan released an EP with former Belle & Sebastian vocalist Isobel Campbell, titled Time Is Just the Same. They would later release a single entitled "Ramblin' Man" for their collaboration album Ballad of the Broken Seas. Campbell wrote and recorded the majority of the album's tracks in Glasgow, with Lanegan adding vocals in Los Angeles. The record was well received by critics.

In addition to providing vocals, Lanegan also wrote the track "Revolver" with Campbell. The album was nominated for the 2006 Mercury Prize. Lanegan and Campbell played four UK concerts in January 2007, with the London date being moved to a larger venue as a result of high demand for tickets. When making the decision to make a follow-up to Ballad of the Broken Seas, Campbell reflected:

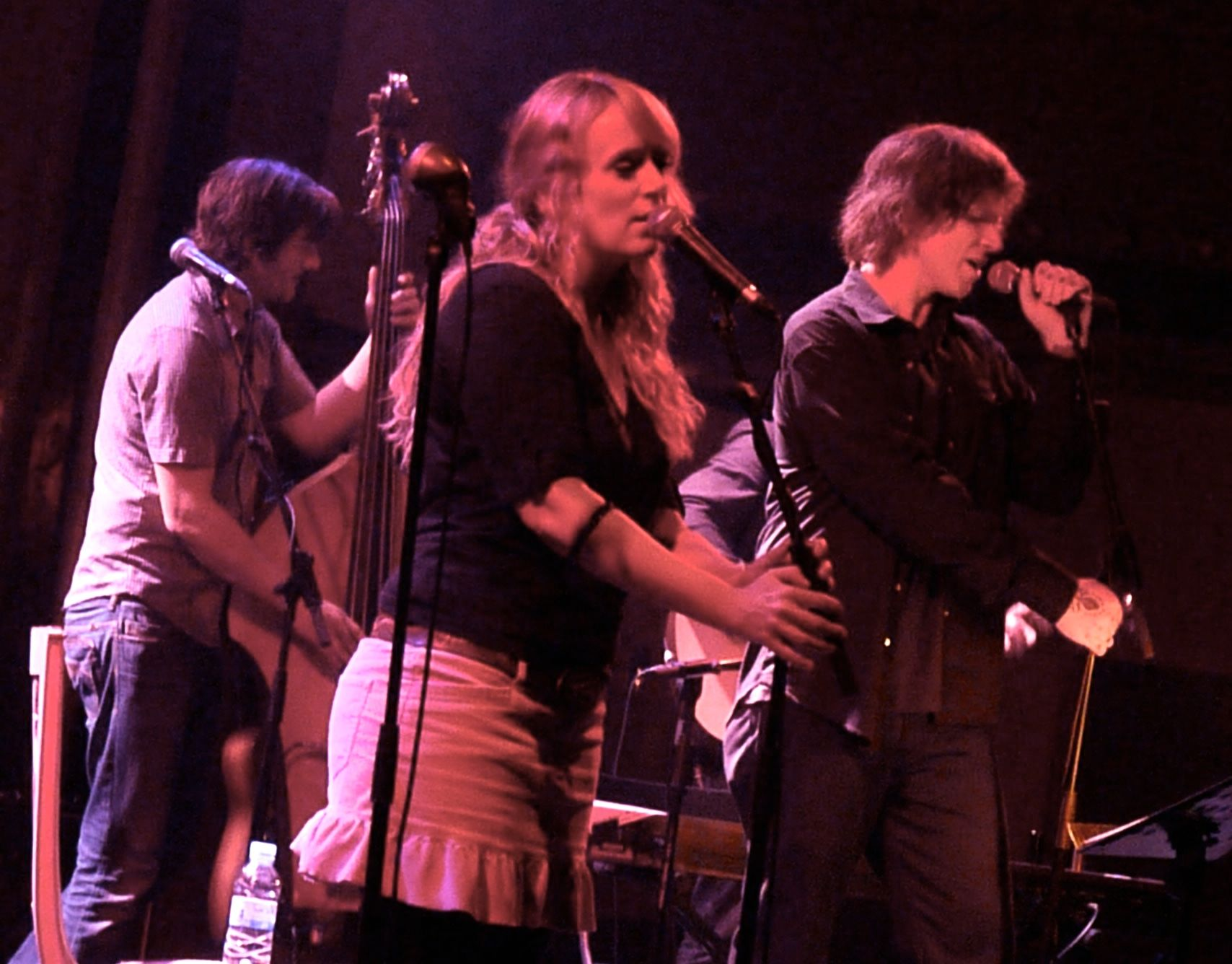
Lanegan and Campbell performing in Barcelona in 2010.

It was because he kinda disappeared for a year but in my heart I wanted to do another one because as soon as we'd finished Ballad of the Broken Seas I was writing new songs and I was like; "Oh God, I've got to get Mark to sing these."

After a concert with Lanegan in January 2007, Campbell asked Lanegan if he would consider making a new album, Lanegan replied: "in a heartbeat". This time Lanegan flew to Glasgow to record the new album at the end of March for nine days to record the songs Campbell had written. After working with Lanegan, Campbell remarked: "It is his classic, effortless American voice that I love". She added "I think I was playing about with that a lot so there's a few of what Mark would call raunchy songs and a few ballads too". The album, Sunday at Devil Dirt, was released on May 5, 2008, with the track "Who Built the Road" being the only single released from it.

A third collaborative album with Campbell was released on August 16, 2010, entitled Hawk. The pair toured to promote the album, including a set at All Tomorrow's Parties, December 10–12, 2010 (Bowlie 2) curated by Belle & Sebastian and shows in Australia in 2011. By the end of the tour the duo had ceased to function and each went their separate ways.

=== The Gutter Twins (2003–2009) ===
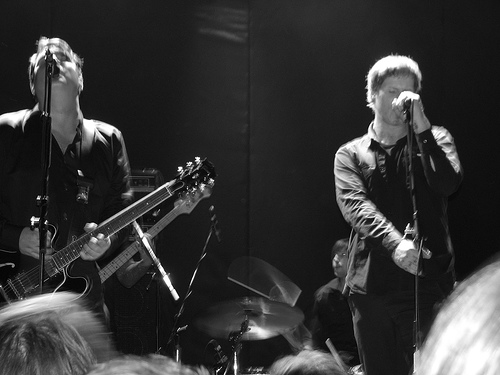
The Gutter Twins at The Bowery Ballroom in 2008. From left: Greg Dulli, Mark Lanegan.

The Gutter Twins was a collaboration between Lanegan and Afghan Whigs/Twilight Singers vocalist Greg Dulli. Working on a collaborative album since at least 2003, the pair first played as The Gutter Twins in Rome in September 2005.

Saturnalia was released on March 4, 2008, on Sub Pop, a label both Dulli and Lanegan had worked with before. The duo's first tour commenced on February 14, 2008, in New York City and continued in March and April throughout Europe and the United States.

The album was a big hit and Blast Magazine's Liz Raftery ended up praising the album calling it "an audial descent into the dark emotions that often lurk beneath the surface." The album's highest position was at number 7 in Belgium. The album also peaked at number 117 on the Billboard 200. It meant that Saturnalia was the first album since Screaming Trees' Dust that had charted on the Billboard 200 with Lanegan as a permanent band member. On September 2, 2008, The Gutter Twins released an EP called Adorata exclusively on iTunes. Adorata contains eight tracks, most of them are covers, but also two Gutter Twins songs that never made it to the album.

=== Collaborations (2006–2022) ===
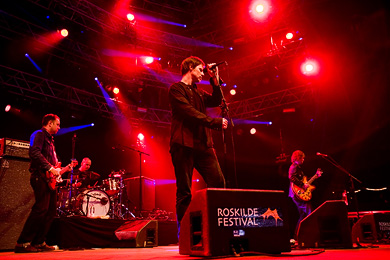
Lanegan performing with Soulsavers at Roskilde Festival.

Lanegan appeared on three releases with The Twilight Singers (Blackberry Belle, She Loves You, and A Stitch in Time). In 2006, Lanegan toured with the band in Europe and Israel on an excursus which later expanded to include the United States. In 2008, Lanegan collaborated with Tim Simenon on a track entitled "Black River" which appeared on Simenon's fourth album under his Bomb the Bass moniker, Future Chaos.

In 2007, English electronica duo Soulsavers' album It's Not How Far You Fall, It's the Way You Land featured Lanegan on 8 out of 10 album tracks. As well as appearing as a vocalist, the tracks "Revival", "Ghosts of You and Me", "Paper Money", and "Jesus of Nothing" are credited as written by Lanegan and Soulsavers. The album also features a re-working of "Kingdoms of Rain", which was initially released on Lanegan's second solo album, Whiskey for the Holy Ghost. "Revival" and "Kingdoms of Rain" were released as singles from the album. Soulsavers recorded the tracks in England in 2005 and 2006, with Lanegan recording the vocal parts at Conway Studios in Los Angeles.

In 2009, Soulsavers again enlisted Lanegan with him contributing vocals for several tracks on their third studio album Broken. This led to a significant run of touring in support of the album, beginning on September 6, in Portland, Oregon. Following the tour of the United States, Lanegan continued to perform with them throughout their extensive run of European shows. These varied between headline gigs and slots in support of Depeche Mode. Having completed touring duties for Soulsavers, Lanegan announced a solo European tour. Shows focused specifically on his solo back catalogue, having not done so since touring finished in support of Bubblegum.

Also in 2009, Lanegan followed in Josh Homme's footsteps in collaborating with Unkle, the British electronic act masterminded by James Lavelle. He contributed his vocals to "Another Night Out", the final track of the album Where Did the Night Fall (released in May 2010).

In 2011, Lanegan's music was featured in a trailer and end credits for the video game Rage and the soundtrack for the film The Hangover Part II. Lanegan collaborated on a track "So Long Sin City" with Slash who recorded music for the 2011 indie film This Is Not a Movie, directed by Olallo Rubio, and starring Edward Furlong, Peter Coyote, Miguel Ferrer, and more.

On April 16, 2013, Lanegan and Duke Garwood released their first studio collaboration, Black Pudding. Lanegan collaborated with Warpaint and Massive Attack for a cover of the xx's song "Crystalised". Lanegan, Warpaint, and Martina Topley-Bird recorded the cover of "Crystalised" and released it as a single in 2013.

For Record Store Day 2013, Lanegan collaborated with Moby to release a 7-inch record called The Lonely Night. Of working with Lanegan, Moby stated: "I've been a fan of Mark's from his early SST records days, and I've always wanted to work with him. He has one of the best and most distinctive voices of the last 25 years. Now that we live near each other it ended up being really easy working on a song together." The Lonely Night also appeared on Moby's album Innocents.

In 2013, Lanegan teamed up with Seattle producer Martin Feveyear, to work on a covers record, Imitations. Prior to its release, Lanegan had only issued one previous record of covers, 1999's I'll Take Care of You. On Imitations, Lanegan offers contemporary songs, standards, and obscure numbers that, according to him, reveal the effect his parents' record collection had on him. He enlisted the help of Seattle composer Andrew Joslyn for the string arrangements and performances, as well as Seattle rock icons Duff McKagan, Barrett Martin, and others. The record was released September 17, 2013, through Vagrant Records.

Lanegan and Josh Homme co-wrote the theme song for Anthony Bourdain: Parts Unknown, which first aired in 2013 on CNN. Lanegan contributed vocals on two tracks on Earth's 2014 album Primitive and Deadly, released on September 2, 2014, and on one track on Manset's 2014 album Un oiseau s'est posé. In 2016 he featured on Wounded Wing by The Duke Spirit. He also worked with Unkle on the track "Looking for the Rain" from their 2017 album The Road: Part I, along with Eska. He also contributed vocals and songwriting to Tuareg rock band Tinariwen's "Nànnuflày" off their 2017 album Elwan.

In 2020, Lanegan contributed a spoken-word vocal performance to the song "The Mirror" by English rock band Hey Colossus, from their album Dances/Curses. He wrote lyrics and recorded lead vocals for "A Drink Of Poison Water" on Spanish duo Agrio's La Murga EP, and also appeared on the eponymous album by Black Phoebe, collaborating with his wife Shelley Brien and members of the Mark Lanegan Band including Martyn LeNoble.

Lanegan contributed vocals on the song "Inside of a Dream" on Cult of Luna's EP The Raging River, released on February 5, 2021, "The Music Becomes a Skull" on The Armed's album Ultrapop, released April 16, 2021, and "Blank Diary Entry" on Manic Street Preachers' 2021 album The Ultra Vivid Lament. In October 2021, Lanegan released a collaborative album with former The Icarus Line member Joe Cardamone entitled Dark Mark vs. Skeleton Joe.

== Books ==
In 2017, Lanegan released the book I Am the Wolf: Lyrics & Writings, a collection of lyrics accompanied by explanations and anecdotes. His memoir, Sing Backwards and Weep, was published on April 28, 2020. Lanegan and Cold Cave frontman Wesley Eisold published a book of poetry Plague Poems in 2020. Another memoir Devil in a Coma was released in 2021, which details Lanegan's experiences contracting COVID-19, and being admitted to Kerry Hospital in March 2021. Leaving California, a final book of 76 new poems, was released in 2021.

Additionally, books have been written about Lanegan by other authors, including 2022's Confessions, Lyrics & Nostalgia Dark Mark Lanegan by Iman Kakai-Lazell (which features photos, lyrics, and text) and 2023's Lanegan by Greg Prato (which includes new interviews with over 20 of Lanegan's collaborators, friends, and admirers).

== Personal life ==
Lanegan struggled with alcoholism and heroin addiction during the 1990s and early 2000s. In his 2020 memoir, he claimed that he was "reviled as the town drunk before [he] could even legally drink" at the age of 12. During a Screaming Trees tour in 1992, his arm became so badly infected from using heroin needles that doctors considered amputating it. After leaving Screaming Trees, he became homeless for a period, then entered rehab in 1997. He credited Courtney Love, who recommended and paid for a year of his rehab and months of rental payments, with saving his life. After his first stint in rehab, he entered a halfway house and was given a job looking after Duff McKagan's house. He relapsed in 2004 and briefly went into a coma. After this relapse, he supported himself financially by painting sets for television shows. He entered rehab again in 2006.

Lanegan was a friend of Kurt Cobain and had been invited to his home a few hours before Cobain's death. He was also a friend of Anthony Bourdain, who encouraged Lanegan to pursue writing a memoir. He wrote an obituary for Bourdain in The Observer after Bourdain's suicide in 2018. He was close friends with Layne Staley and had a highly publicized feud with Liam Gallagher. He supported the Seattle SuperSonics basketball team while growing up and switched allegiances to the Los Angeles Clippers upon moving to Los Angeles, though he remained a fan of the Seattle Mariners baseball team.

Lanegan was married twice. He met musician Wendy Rae Fowler in 1998 and married her in 2002, with the couple relocating from Los Angeles to North Carolina. The day after their wedding, Lanegan departed for a tour with Queens of the Stone Age and the couple divorced soon afterwards. His second wife was Shelley Brien, with whom he remained until his death. The two left the U.S. and moved to the Irish town of Killarney in 2020.

In March 2021, Lanegan was hospitalized with a severe infection of COVID-19 and almost died. The virus led to him temporarily going deaf, losing the ability to walk, and slipping in and out of a coma for several months. Nine months later, he said he had concluded that the COVID-19 pandemic was a "natural event" and admitted, "I was one of those knuckleheads who was wary of the vaccine. But I learned my lesson. I'll be the first one to get a booster shot when it's available in Ireland."

== Death ==
Lanegan died at his home in Killarney on the morning of February 22, 2022, at the age of 57. No cause of death was revealed. Artists including Eddie Vedder, Iggy Pop, Moby, Scott Lucas, Simon Bonney, John Cale, Sleaford Mods, Badly Drawn Boy, Anton Newcombe, Peter Hook, Slash, Nick Cave, Nick Oliveri, and the members of Manic Street Preachers paid tribute. Locals of Killarney, described as a "tightly knit community", also expressed a sense of loss.

An obituary in The Guardian by Stevie Chick remembered him as "one of his generation's most soulful singers". In Variety, music writer Chris Morris described him as "impassioned" and "adventurous".

Lanegan was laid to rest at Hollywood Forever Cemetery in Los Angeles, California.

== Discography ==
Solo albums

- The Winding Sheet (1990)
- Whiskey for the Holy Ghost (1994)
- Scraps at Midnight (1998)
- I'll Take Care of You (1999)
- Field Songs (2001)
- Bubblegum (2004)
- Blues Funeral (2012)
- Imitations (2013)
- Phantom Radio (2014)
- Gargoyle (2017)
- Somebody's Knocking (2019)
- Straight Songs of Sorrow (2020)

== Bibliography ==
- I Am the Wolf: Lyrics & Writings (2017)
- Sing Backwards and Weep (2020)
- Plague Poems with Wesley Eisold (2020)
- Leaving California (2021)
- Devil in a Coma (2021)
- Plague Poems with Wesley Eisold (2022)
- Year Zero: A World with No Flowers with Wesley Eisold (2022)
- Ghost Radio with Wesley Eisold (2022)
- Confessions, Lyrics & Nostalgia Dark Mark Lanegan by Iman Kakai-Lazell (2022)
