= The Duke Spirit discography =

This is a comprehensive listing of official releases by English band The Duke Spirit. The band has been active since 2003, having released five studio albums to date, as well as numerous singles and EPs.

== Albums ==
=== Studio albums ===
Title	Album details	Peak chart positions		
Title	Album details	UK	UK Indie	SCO
Cuts Across the Land	Released: May 2005; Label: Loog	40	—	47
Neptune	Released: 4 February 2008; Label: You Are Here	63	5	92
Bruiser	Released: September 2011; Label: Fiction	80	—	—
Kin	Released: May 2016; Label: Ex Voto	73	9	73
Sky Is Mine	Released: Aug 2017; Label: Ex Voto	—	11	—
"—" denotes items that did not chart or were not released in that territory.

=== Live ===
- Dresden Live (April 2012)

=== EPs ===
- Darling You're Mean (May 2003)
- Roll, Spirit, Roll (October 2003)
- Relieve the Distressed (16 May 2005)
- Covered in Love (December 2006)
- Ex-Voto EP (22 November 2007)
- Kusama EP (21 December 2010)
- Serenade EP (17 October 2016)

=== Compilations ===
- 50 Years of Dr. Martens: The Album (Compilation, 2010, contributed a cover of Sham 69's "If the Kids Are United")
- Batman: Arkham City (Soundtrack, October 2011, contributed the song "Creature")

== Singles ==
Year	Title	UK	U.S.	U.S. Modern	Album
2003	"Solomon"	-	-	-	non-album
2003	"Darling You're Mean"	-	-	-	Cuts Across the Land
2004	"Dark Is Light Enough"	55	-	-	Cuts Across the Land
2004	"Cuts Across the Land"	45	-	-	Cuts Across the Land
2005	"Lion Rip"	25	-	-	Cuts Across the Land
2005	"Love Is an Unfamiliar Name"	33	-	-	Cuts Across the Land
2005	"Cuts Across the Land" (reissue)	66	-	-	Cuts Across the Land
2008	"The Step and the Walk"	-	-	-	Neptune
2008	"Send a Little Love Token"	-	-	-	Neptune
2008	"My Sunken Treasure"	-	-	-	Neptune
2011	"Surrender"	-	-	-	Bruiser
2011	"Don't Wait"	-	-	-	Bruiser
2012	"Glorious"	-	-	-	non-album
2015	"Blue and Yellow Light"	-	-	-	Kin
2016	"Hands"	-	-	-	Kin

== Guest appearances ==
- War Stories (Unkle album, June 2007, appeared on the song "Mayday")

Additionally, Liela Moss has provided vocals for

- Brakes on their cover of "Jackson" from the album Give Blood (July 2005)
- Archie Bronson Outfit on "In the Shadow of Love", the B-side of their single "Dart For My Sweetheart" (February 2006)
- D. Sardy on the song "Giant" from the soundtrack to 21 (March 2008)
