= Eamon Hamilton =

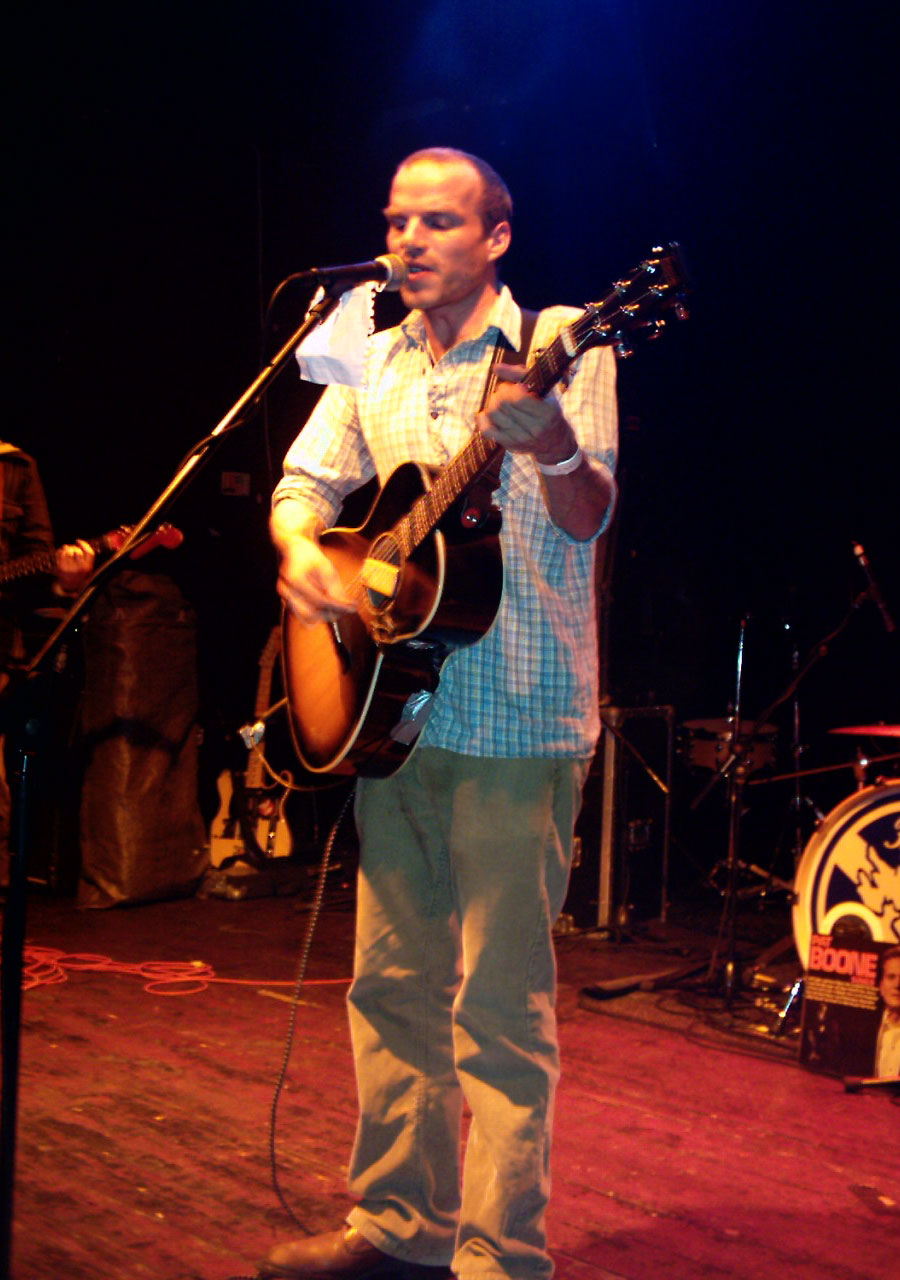
- Hamilton live with Brakes in Liverpool in 2004

Background information
- Born: Eamon Peter Hamilton; 20 August 1975 (age 51); Stewart, British Columbia, Canada
- Origin: Stroud, Gloucestershire, England
- Occupation: Musician
- Instruments: Vocals, keyboards, guitar
- Labels: Rough Trade, Fat Cat, Tugboat Records
- Website: Brakes Official Website

Eamon Peter Hamilton (born 20 August 1975) is an English musician. He fronted the Brighton based band Brakes. He also previously fronted the band Brighter Lunch and played keyboards with Sea Power.

== Early life ==
Hamilton was born on 20 August 1975 in Stewart, BC, Canada. His family moved to England where he grew up in Chalford, near Stroud, Gloucestershire. He attended Marling School.

== Career ==
In 2000, Hamilton moved to Brighton, England. In 2002, was recruited to play keyboards for British Sea Power live. The band were reportedly impressed that—without warning and during a song without keyboards— Hamilton went off into the crowd banging a drum. In 2006, due to touring commitments with Brakes, Hamilton left British Sea Power.

Hamilton has recorded and played live under a number of different guises. One of his main projects was Brighter Lunch, also featuring Matt Eaton, now of Actress Hands.

In August 2002, Tom and Alex White of The Electric Soft Parade saw Hamilton performing solo and offered to play guitar and drums, respectively, with him. They were joined by Marc Beatty, of Mockin' Bird Studios and The Tenderfoot, to play bass. Brakes was born. Their debut single, Pick Up the Phone, was released in 2004 on Tugboat Records and an album, Give Blood, followed in July 2005. In October 2006 they released their second album The Beatific Visions. They released their third album Touchdown in 2009.

== Personal life ==
On 1 September 2008, Hamilton married the American author Koren Zailckas in Romainville near Paris. He moved to the New York shortly after their marriage, where he has worked in real estate and as a server in a restaurant.

== Selected discography ==
=== Brighter Lunch ===
- "Going My Way" – 2001, self-financed
- "Call A Medic" – 8 October 2001 on Monkey Tennis

=== Brakes ===
==== Albums ====
- Give Blood – 4 July 2005 on Rough Trade Records
- The Beatific Visions – October 2006
- Touchdown – 20 April 2009 on Fat Cat Records

==== Singles and EPs ====
- "Pick Up the Phone" – 20 September 2005 on Tugboat Records
- "All Night Disco Party" – 13 June 2005 on Rough Trade Records
- "Ring A Ding Ding" – 17 October 2005 on Rough Trade Records
- "Hold Me in the River" – 4 December 2006 on Rough Trade Records
- "Cease And Desist" – 26 February 2007
- "Beatific Visions" – 20 August 2007
