= Tenderfoot =

Tenderfoot or The Tenderfoot may refer to:

== Common meanings ==
- Tenderfoot Scout (Boy Scouts of America), a Scouting rank
- A guest at a guest ranch, also known as a "dude"

== Film and television ==
- The Tenderfoot, a 1917 American film starring and directed by William Duncan
- The Tenderfoot, a 1919 American comedy film starring and directed by Marcel Perez
- The Tenderfoot (film), a 1932 film starring Joe E. Brown
- Alternate title of The Dude Goes West, a 1948 comedy Western film featuring Eddie Albert
- Alternate title of Bushwhacked (film), a 1995 film starring Daniel Stern
- Tenderfoot, the name under which the series Sugarfoot was first shown in the UK in 1960
- The Tenderfoot (miniseries), a 1964 Disney television miniseries

== Music ==
- The Tenderfoot (band), a British band
- "Tenderfoot", a song by Tom Morgan on the Lemonheads album Car Button Cloth

== Places ==
- Tenderfoot Mountain, a mountain in Colorado

== See also ==
- Le Pied-tendre (translation: The Tenderfoot), a 1968 French comic
