= Gravedigger (disambiguation) =

A gravedigger is a cemetery worker who is responsible for digging a grave prior to a funeral service.

Gravedigger, or variants, may also refer to:

== Arts and entertainment ==
=== Fictional characters ===
- The Gravediggers, in William Shakespeare's Hamlet
- The Gravedigger, a character in American TV series Bones

=== Music ===
- Grave Digger (band), a German heavy metal band
- The Grave Diggers, an American rockabilly band
- Gravediggaz, an American hip hop group
- The Grave Digger, a 2001 album by Grave Digger
- Gravedigger (album), by Janus, 1972
- "Gravedigger" (song), by Dave Matthews, 2003, also performed by Willie Nelson
- "The Gravedigger's Song", by Mark Lanegan, 2012
- "Gravedigger", a song from the New York Rock & Roll Ensemble 1971 album Roll Over.
- "Gravedigger", a song by Architects from the 2014 album Lost Forever // Lost Together
- "Gravedigger", a song by The Browning from the 2014 album Hypernova

=== Other uses in arts and entertainment ===
- "The Gravediggers" (The Avengers), an episode of the 1960s TV series
- "The Grave Digger", a 1952 Arabic poem by Badr Shakir al-Sayyab
- Gravedigger, a 1982 book by Joseph Hansen

== Other uses ==
- Grave Digger (monster truck), a monster truck racing team
- The Gravedigger, a professional wrestler from the United States Wrestling Association
- Grave digger, also known as “4th and 31”, the winning play from the college football rivalry game, Iron Bowl 2023

== See also ==
- Grobari (Serbian for 'gravediggers'), fans of FK Partizan Belgrade
