= With Animals =

Studio album by Duke Garwood and Mark Lanegan
- Released: August 24, 2018
- Length: 38:00
- Label: Heavenly

Duke Garwood and Mark Lanegan chronology
Black Pudding (2013)	With Animals (2018)

Professional ratings
Aggregate scores
Source	Rating
AnyDecentMusic?	7.4/10
Metacritic	82/100
Review scores
Source	Rating
AllMusic	4/5 stars
Blurt	4/5 stars
Exclaim!	7/10
MusicOMH	4/5 stars
Paste	8.7/10

With Animals is the second collaborative studio album by American singer-songwriter Mark Lanegan and English multi-instrumentalist Duke Garwood. It was released on August 24, 2018 through Heavenly Recordings.

== Critical reception ==
With Animals was met with "universal acclaim" reviews from critics. At Metacritic, which assigns a weighted average rating out of 100 to reviews from mainstream publications, this release received an average score of 82 based on 11 reviews. Aggregator Album of the Year gave the release a 76 out of 100 based on a critical consensus of 11 reviews.

== Track listing ==
All tracks are written by Duke Garwood and Mark Lanegan, except where noted

No.	Title	Lyrics	Length
1.	"Save Me"		4:08
2.	"Feast to Famine"		3:30
3.	"My Shadow Life"	Lanegan	4:16
4.	"Upon Doing Something Wrong"	Lanegan	3:41
5.	"L.A. Blue"		2:47
6.	"Scarlett"		3:00
7.	"Lonesome Infidel"		2:57
8.	"With Animals"		3:15
9.	"Ghost Stories"		2:46
10.	"Spaceman"		2:48
11.	"One Way Glass"	Lanegan	2:34
12.	"Desert Song"		2:19
Total length:			38:00

== Charts ==
Chart performance for With Animals
Chart (2018)	Peak position
Austrian Albums (Ö3 Austria)	69
Belgian Albums (Ultratop Flanders)	19
Belgian Albums (Ultratop Wallonia)	159
Dutch Albums (Album Top 100)	143
German Albums (Offizielle Top 100)	96
Italian Albums (FIMI)	99
Swiss Albums (Schweizer Hitparade)	38
UK Albums (Official Charts)	68
US Independent Albums (Billboard)	41
