= The Electric Soft Parade =

English psych pop band

- Origin: Brighton, England
- Genres: Indie rock, psych pop
- Years active: 2001–2008; 2010–2024/25
- Label: Helium Records (UK)
- Members: Alex White; Thomas White; Andrew Mitchell; Matthew Twaites; Damo Waters
- Past members: Stephen Large; Mathew Priest; Matt Eaton; Joe Harling; Alan Grice; Alistair Gavan; Russell Gleason
- Website: Official website

The Electric Soft Parade was an English psychedelic pop band from Brighton, comprising brothers Alex and Thomas White, the creative core of the band, as well as a number of other musicians with whom they record and perform live, most recently including Andrew Mitchell (of Dundee-based group The Hazey Janes) and Damo Waters, as well as long-standing bass/keyboard player, Matthew Twaites.

== Career ==
Alex and Thomas originally formed Fixed Ascent (later The Feltro Media) with schoolfriends Alistair Gavan and Russell Gleason in around 1997. Whilst ostensibly a formulaic indie outfit, there were flashes of the more complex symphonic arrangements and varied production values that would characterise later Electric Soft Parade releases, and over three self-released albums the band cultivated a (relatively) original sound, not unlike that of Holes in the Wall. Following interest in their 1999 LP, The Wonderful World of the Feltro Media, the band were offered a deal with DB Records (a subsidiary of BMG). The band officially signed to DB Records (as a two-piece) in January 2001, with their debut single following that April. Their original choice for a name was "The Soft Parade" but were made to change it after legal action by an American band the Doors (The Soft Parade being the title of a Doors album).

=== 2002–2004 ===
The Brothers' debut, Holes in the Wall was released in February 2002 to wide critical acclaim. With A&R and production from Chris Hughes, the album spawned two UK top-forty hits and led to performances on Top of the Pops, Later With Jools Holland and a world-tour covering Europe, Japan and Australasia. They were also nominated for the 2002 Mercury Music Prize, where they lost out to Ms. Dynamite. They later won the Q Award for Best New Act.

The band's second LP, The American Adventure appeared in October 2003 on BMG Records. Largely a response to their treatment at the hands of BMG (DB had by this point folded despite substantial sales, and the band had been automatically up-streamed) the album was seen as too much of a departure from their previous work, and the band were dropped in early 2004. On release, the album received wildly differing responses, largely criticising the looser arrangements and downbeat feel (though NME awarded it 9/10, lauding the bands' "near-superhuman powers"). However, the album can now be seen as a major turning point in the bands' sound – from the hi-tech, digital production of Holes in the Wall to the organic feel of later releases.

=== 2005–2008 ===
The Electric Soft Parade returned in late 2005 with the six-track The Human Body EP on Truck Records. The U.S. version of The Human Body EP was released in May 2006 on Better Looking Records (their first official US release). ESP made their first U.S. appearance at the South by Southwest Festival in March 2006.

A third full album was released in April 2007. Entitled No Need to Be Downhearted, it was named after a lyric from The Fall's song "15 Ways" from their Middle Class Revolt album. The album was entirely self-produced, using Truck Records' rudimentary Portakabin studio in the Oxford countryside.

In March and April 2007 they made their second visit to the South by Southwest Festival, took part in a tribute to Billy MacKenzie at Shepherd's Bush Empire in aid of Sound Seekers, and played a UK tour. There was also an extensive U.S. tour in May and June 2007 with Brakes and Pela.

July and August 2007 saw appearances at UK and European festivals in the Netherlands, Austria, France, Switzerland and Germany. The final single to be taken from No Need to Be Downhearted, "Appropriate Ending", was released on 26 November as a digital download. It included two covers, "Happiness" originally by Elliott Smith and "Friends of the Heroes" by The Aislers Set. The band toured from October to December 2007 with shows in France, Belgium, Spain, United Kingdom and Germany. The beginning of 2008 saw shows in Germany, Austria, Switzerland and France including dates supporting Ian Brown.

On 11 June 2008, The Electric Soft Parade supported Sparks at their Hello Young Lovers show – the last of a 20 concert extravaganza at the Islington Academy, London. Following this show, the band took a two-year break from touring and recording.

=== 2009–2011 ===
In December 2010, the band returned to the stage (as a five-piece) for the first time in over two years, at Maximalism!, a charity concert organised by the White brothers in aid of The Martlets Hospice. In January 2011 an official Facebook page appeared online, with details of new material and appearances. Energised by the reaction at the December show, the band held a monthly residency from March through June at The Prince Albert, Brighton, where they revisited their entire back catalogue in sequence, as well as debuting brand new material.

"A Quick One" EP, a four-song download (and double A-side 7"), was released by Paris-based label A Quick One Records on 18 July 2011. Featuring a new song from each of the brothers, as well as two cover versions ("If I Can Dream" and "Orange Crate Art"") the EP marks the very first time the brothers have taken their "live band" into the recording studio. The band have stated their plan to record and release a series of EP's over the coming year, culminating in a 4th full-length album sometime in 2012.

The band rounded off 2011 with a run of UK shows, including support slots with Noel Gallagher's High Flying Birds, British Sea Power and Dodgy, as well as choice headline shows of their own.

=== 2012–2013 ===
Reuniting once again with the production team that made their debut, "Holes in the Wall", ESP spent much of 2012 in Wiltshire recording tracks for what would become their 4th LP, "IDIOTS". A single, "Brother, You Must Walk Your Path Alone", was made available in early March 2013, with the full-length album slated for release on 17 June.

=== 2014–2024/25 ===
The band has toured sporadically since "IDIOTS", with occasional dates around the UK, and a May 2019 tour of France and Belgium.

During 2018–19, the band was connected to Pledge Music, and was negatively affected by the fallout from the revelations of alleged fraud and the failure of the company to pay through the results of completed pledges. They are thought to have lost around £10,000.

An album, Stages, was released on 8 January 2020 through the band's own label Chord Orchard. The first song made available from Stages, "Roles Reversed", was released freely via the band's YouTube.

On 19 May 2023, the band revealed their latest album, titled 'Avenue Dot,' dedicated to Joanne Chapman and written in her house. The album was released through their label Chord Orchard's Bandcamp. Prior to the full album release, the band offered a sneak peek to the public with the release of the first song, 'A Temporary Star.'

The band disbanded around 2024-25.

== Related projects ==
=== Brakes ===
After being released from their label in 2004, the White brothers began collaborating on a much harder, punk-influenced project with Sea Power's ex-keyboardist Eamon Hamilton and bassist Marc Beatty, of Tenderfoot. Over the next year, the band gigged under various names, including The Scars and Hungry Hamilton, all the while building a reputation as a formidable live act. After releasing their debut single, "Pick Up The Phone", through Tugboat in late 2004, Brakes were offered a deal with Rough Trade Records, and promptly recorded their debut, Give Blood, in January 2005. To date, they have released three critically acclaimed albums – two with Rough Trade (2005's Give Blood and 2006's The Beatific Visions) and one with Fat Cat Records (2009's Touchdown).

=== Thomas White ===
Thomas White released his debut solo album, I Dream of Black, on 14 July 2008 through Drift Records in the UK, Better Looking Records in the U.S. He spent much of 2009 touring and recording with Patrick Wolf. A follow-up, The Maximalist, was released through Cooking Vinyl in March 2010. Thomas's third full-length LP, "YALLA!" (Arabic for 'follow me') was released through Brighton's Bleeding Heart Recordings in March 2012 to mostly positive reviews. The album consists of just vocal and guitar and was recorded entirely on a MacBook in the home of a friend in Dahab, Egypt. As with The Maximalist, shows to promote the album have featured Thomas accompanied by a revolving choir of Brighton musicians, often decorated in Egyptian-style galabiyas.

=== The Pipettes and Official Secrets Act ===
For most of 2009, Alex has been co-writing, arranging and drumming on a new Pipettes album as well as assisting London-based band Official Secrets Act.

== Discography ==
=== Albums ===
- Holes in the Wall (DB Records CD/LP, February 2002) UK No. 35
- The American Adventure (BMG CD/LP, October 2003) UK No. 45
- No Need to Be Downhearted (Truck Records/Better Looking Records CD, April 2007) UK No. 163
- Idiots (Helium Records CD/Vinyl/Download, June 2013)
- Stages (Chord Orchard CD/Vinyl/Download, January 2020)

=== Singles and EPs ===
- "Silent to the Dark" / "Something's Got to Give" (2001), DB Records
- "Empty at the End" / "Sumatran" (2001), DB Records – UK No. 65
- "There's a Silence" (2001), DB Records – UK No. 52
- "Silent to the Dark II" (2002), DB Records – UK No. 23
- "Empty at the End" / "This Given Line" (2002), DB Records – UK# 39
- "Same Way, Every Day" (2002), DB Records
- "Things I've Done Before" (2003), BMG
- "Lose Yr Frown" (2003), BMG
- The Human Body EP (2005), Truck Records
- "Life in the Back-Seat" (2006), Truck Records
- "If That's the Case, Then I Don't Know" (2007), Truck Records
- "Misunderstanding" (2007), Truck Records
- Appropriate Ending EP (2007), Truck Records
- A Quick One EP (2011), A Quick One Records
- "Brother, You Must Walk Your Path Alone" (2013), Helium Records
