= Tenebrous Liar =

tenebrous LIAR
- Origin: England
- Genres: Alternative rock
- Years active: 2005 –present
- Labels: TV Records; Fire Records (UK)
- Members: Steve Gullick; Tom Glendining; Brendan Casey; Aimee Lovric
- Past members: Ed Harcourt; Richard Warren; Pete Spiby; Tom Glendining; Dan Glendining; James Maiden; Tony Ash; Duke Garwood; Alexandra Brown; John Arthur Webb; John Lynch; Ben Edgar; Ben Mochrie

Tenebrous Liar (stylized as tenebrous LIAR) is an English rock band founded in 2005 by musician Steve Gullick.

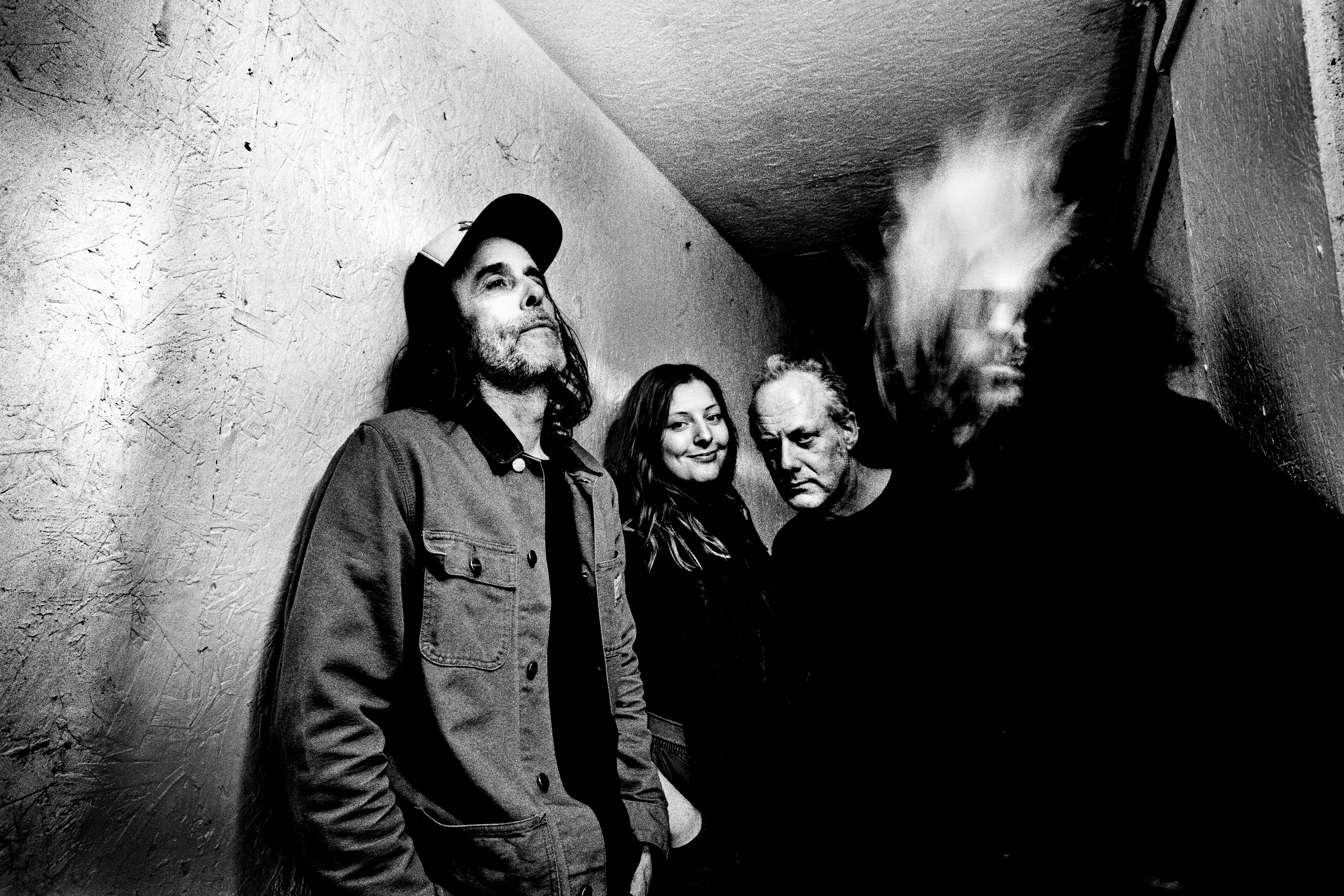
tenebrous LIAR – 2025

Since its conception, tenebrous LIAR grew to become a four-part rock group and has gone on to record multiple studio albums. Throughout the years tenebrous LIAR has experienced many line up changes with Gullick remaining as the only constant member of the group. The band cites its musical influences to be acts such as Neil Young, Nirvana, The Stooges and The Velvet Underground. In contrast to this, reviewers and critics often describe the music as having a darker tone, using terms such as grimy rock and bleak to describe the group's music.

Tenebrous Liar have released seven studio albums, the most recent four being released on TV Records, produced by labelmate Richard Warren.

== Live ==
Tenebrous Liar have played live with many artists over the years including Foo Fighters, Nick Cave and the Bad Seeds, Soulsavers, The Magic Numbers, Will Oldham, Richard Warren, Josh T. Pearson, Black Spiders, Oxbow, The Icarus Line, Arrows of Love, Blood Red Shoes, Underground Railroad, Cindytalk, John & Jen, Ed Harcourt and Scout Niblett.

== Discography ==
=== Albums ===
- Tenebrous (CD – Fire Records – January 2006)
- The Havering – Tenebrous Mitchell – (CD – Fire Records – April 2007)
- Tenebrous – Liar (CD – Fire Records – June 2007)
- Tenebrous Liar's Last Stand (CD – TV Records – October 2008)
- Jackknifed and Slaughtered (Vinyl / CD – TV Records – January 2010)
- Run Run Run (Vinyl / CD – TV Records – January 2011)
- End of the Road (CD – TV Records / Vinyl – Deathto – October 2012)
- The Cut (Vinyl / CD – Deathto – June 2017)
- Hell Never Called (Vinyl / download – Deathto – March 2025)

=== Singles ===
- "Yellow Moon" 7" (August 2006)
- "Approaching Happy" 7" (September 2007)
- "Pretender EP" cd (November 2008)
- "No Guiding Light" 7" (September 2009)
- "Turn It On EP" cassette (December 2016)
- "Alienation EP" cd (November 2017)
- "Ball of Words EP" – Tenebrous Mitchell – Lathe cut 7" (March 2020)
