= Jaqueline =

Norwegian hard rock band

Jaqueline is a hard rock band from Elverum, Norway.

== History ==
The trio, composed of Morten Wærhaug, Marius Drogsås Hagen and Bjarne Ryen Berg, formed in 1998 and released their debut album Idiots in March 2005. Idiots was given the score 5/6 in Norway's three biggest newspapers; one critic dubbed the album "Norwegian rock debut of the year".

In 2006 the band released their second album Reaping Machines and has received further critical acclaim in the Norwegian media. The video for the single Demon Seed has also been shown numerous times on the Norwegian television show Svisj. As of 2006 the band is touring various places in Norway. Their latest album is called Cape Horn and was released in 2009.

== Members ==
- Morten Wærhaug – vocals, guitar, bass guitar
- Marius Drogsås Hagen – vocals, bass guitar, guitar
- Bjarne Ryen Berg – drums

== Discography ==
- Idiots (2005)
- Reaping Machines (2006)
- Cape Horn (2009)
