= Dreamboatsafari =

Studio album by Duke Garwood
- Released: 25 January 2011
- Genre: Blues
- Length: 42:09
- Label: Fire Records

Duke Garwood chronology
The Sand That Falls (2009)	Dreamboatsafari (2011)	Black Pudding (2013)

Professional ratings
Review scores
Source	Rating
musicOMH	3.5/5 stars
NME	3.5/5 stars
The Skinny	3/5 stars

Dreamboatsafari is a studio album by the English multi-instrumentalist Duke Garwood. It was released by Fire Records on 25 January 2011.

== Critical reception ==
NME wrote that "skeletal percussion is given the illusion of flesh under a covering of drones, scrapes and rusty emulations, and hearty burps from a leprous saxophone ... if it's the blues, it's a very Beefheart blues; which is, of course, the very best kind." The Oklahoma Gazette wrote that "the recording was done in a mid-fi way that plays up the fuzzy edges of the sound and ties in the outlier acoustic bits."

== Track listing ==
No.	Title	Length
1.	"Jesus Got a Gun"	3:21
2.	"Gods in My Shoes"	3:16
3.	"Panther"	4:06
4.	"Gold Watch"	3:25
5.	"Space Trucker Lady"	4:32
6.	"Summer Gold"	2:18
7.	"Wine Blood"	2:09
8.	"Gengis"	3:40
9.	"Tapestry of Mars"	2:44
10.	"Flames of Gold"	3:40
11.	"Rank Panache"	2:31
12.	"Taras Bulbous"	2:45
13.	"Larry"	3:42

== Personnel ==
- Duke Garwood – vocals, guitar (1–3, 5–13), bass guitar (4, 10), bulbul tarang (13), horns (3), keyboards (4, 9), saxophone (8–9), piano (8)
- Neil May – bass guitar (5, 8, 11–12)
- Paul May – drums (2–3, 5–6, 8–13), percussion (13)
