= Heavy Love =

Heavy Love might refer to:

== Music ==
Albums

- Heavy Love (Duke Garwood album), an album by Duke Garwood
- Heavy Love (Man Overboard album), an album by Man Overboard
- Heavy Love (Al Cohn and Jimmy Rowles album), an album by Al Cohn and Jimmy Rowles
- Heavy Love (Louise album), an album by Louise Redknapp

Songs

- "Heavy Love", a song by Metavari
- "Heavy Love", a song by David Ruffin from Who I Am
- "Heavy Love", a song by Serena Ryder from Harmony
- "Heavy Love", a song by Neil Young from Eldorado
- "Heavy Love" (Odetari song), 2025

== Films ==
- Heavy Love, a film featuring Ton of Fun
