= Give Blood (Brakes album) =

Studio album by Brakes
- Released: 4 July 2005
- Recorded: 22–30 January 2005 at Metropolis
- Genre: Indie rock
- Length: 28:57
- Label: Rough Trade
- Producer: Iain Gore, Brakes

Brakes chronology
Give Blood (2005)	The Beatific Visions (2006)

Professional ratings
Review scores
Source	Rating
AllMusic	4/5 stars
Robert Christgau	(A−)
The Observer	5/5 stars
Pitchfork	7.5/10 stars

Give Blood is the debut album from the Brighton-based band, Brakes. The album was recorded onto 2" tape and mixed onto 1/4" tape in January 2005. Brakes and their 22-year-old producer, Iain Gore, also removed all computer screens from the studio for the week and all the tracks were recorded live, with the duets being recorded around one mike. The only overdubs were lap steel on "Jackson" by bassist Marc Beatty, piano by drummer Alex White and guitar by Tom White on "I Can't Stand To Stand Beside You".

The album also features Matt Eaton of Actress Hands on "The Most Fun", Liela Moss of The Duke Spirit on "Jackson" and Rose, Becki and Julia of The Pipettes on "Sometimes Always".

The album was voted best of 2005 by the prestigious indie music shop Rough Trade.

== Track listing ==
All songs by Brakes except where noted.

1. "Ring a Ding Ding"
2. "NY Pie"
3. "The Most Fun"
4. "Heard About Your Band"
5. "What's in It for Me?" (Hamilton/Farmer/Eaton/Gray, arr. by Brakes)
6. "You'll Always Have a Place to Stay"
7. "Cheney"
8. "I Can't Stand to Stand Beside You"
9. "Pick Up the Phone"
10. "You're So Pretty"
11. "Jackson" (Jerry Leiber & Billy Edd Wheeler)
12. "All Night Disco Party"
13. "Hi How Are You"
14. "Comma Comma Comma Full Stop"
15. "Sometimes Always" (William Reid)
16. "Fell in Love with a Girl"

== Personnel ==
=== Brakes ===
- Eamon Hamilton – vocals, guitar
- Marc Beatty – bass guitar, lapsteel
- Thomas White – electric guitar, percussion
- Alex White – drums, piano

=== Other musicians ===
- Matt Eaton – backing vocals on "The Most Fun"
- Liela Moss – duet vocals on "Jackson"
- Rose Elinor Dougall, Rebecca Stephens, Julia Clarke-Lowes – duet vocals on "Sometimes Always"

=== Technical ===
- Iain Gore, Brakes – producer, mixing
- Tim Young – mastering
- Matt Paul, Fergus McHugh, Carlos Olmos – assistant engineering
