= American Adventure =

(The) American Adventure and similar may refer to:

- The American Adventure Theme Park, formerly in Derbyshire, England, now shut down
- The American Adventure (Epcot), the host pavilion of the World Showcase at Walt Disney World Resort in Florida (US), and its main attraction
- The American Adventure (album), the second music album by UK prog-pop duo The Electric Soft Parade
- American Adventure (film), a 1936 Polish musical comedy film
