= The Duke Spirit =

English rock band

Background information
- Origin: London, England
- Genres: Alternative rock, indie rock, garage rock
- Years active: 2003–present (on hiatus since 2017)
- Labels: You Are Here; Fiction Records
- Members: Liela Moss; Luke B. Ford; Toby Butler; Oliver Betts; Rich Fownes
- Past members: Dan Higgins; Marc Sallis
- Website: Official site

The Duke Spirit are an English rock band formed in London in 2003 and now based between the UK and Australia. Their sound has been seen as a melding of influences ranging from alternative rock bands such as The Jesus and Mary Chain and Spiritualized, the tremulous rock'n'roll of bands such as The Gun Club and The Patti Smith Group, to distinctive rhythmic Atlantic soul and Motown influences. Singer Liela Moss has released several solo records and also performs together with Toby Butler in the electro-rock duo Roman Remains. Drummer, Olly Betts is also an established record producer.

== History ==
The band was formed in London in 2003 by Liela Moss (vocals), Luke B. Ford (guitar), Toby Butler (bass) and Dan Higgins (guitar).

Ford and Moss met at art college in Cheltenham where he was studying photography and Moss was taking a Fine Art course. After moving to London and a short period writing and performing as Solomon (in which they were later joined by Butler) they formed The Duke Spirit. Along with guitarist Dan Higgins they set about writing, recording and self-producing a group of songs that formed the basis of their first single and EP. Higgins also created the woodcuts that served as the band's early artwork.

The band released their second single "Darling You're Mean/Bottom of the Sea" in May on the City Rockers label. The line-up was completed by drummer Olly "The Kid" Betts, and the band played their first show at the Brixton Windmill later that year. They released the Roll, Spirit, Roll EP toward the end of 2003, which won the band critical acclaim from publications such as NME.

They moved over to Loog Records/Polydor and released their first full-length album, Cuts Across The Land in the UK on 16 May 2005. The album's producers were Simon Raymonde (formerly the bass player in The Cocteau Twins, and now Bella Union Label boss) and Flood, who had produced many artists that the band admired, such as Nick Cave and the Bad Seeds and PJ Harvey. After headlining tours of the UK, the album was released in the U.S. and the band found themselves travelling through America for much of 2006, including a highly praised performance at the Coachella 2006 festival, California.

The only release of 2006 was a downloadable EP and limited 7" single entitled Covered in Love, released through the band's own Velo Recordings. This was a collection of songs, recorded to 8-track by the band, written by the recently deceased (Arthur Lee, Desmond Dekker and Jessie Mae Hemphill). In early 2007, the band signed to You Are Here, a new independent Anglo-Canadian label. The track "Mayday", a collaboration between UNKLE and The Duke Spirit was released on the latest UNKLE album, War Stories, in the UK on 9 July 2007. The track was recorded with Chris Goss at the Rancho De La Luna studio in Joshua Tree, California where they returned in April 2007 to record their own second album, also with Goss. Neptune was released in February 2008. Shortly afterwards, Higgins left the band, which prompted a personnel shuffle: Toby Butler switched to guitar, with longtime friend Marc Sallis replacing him on bass.

In February 2009, the band released a 10-track compilation CD featuring three songs never released in the US ("Masca", "Souvenir", "Do What You Love") as well as a cover of Alex Chilton's "Baby Doll". The CD was sold alongside an Alexander McQueen collection that included a shirt featuring the face of singer Liela Moss.

The band's third album, Bruiser (produced by Andrew Scheps and UNKLE's Rich File), was released in September 2011 through Fiction in the UK, Shangrila music in the U.S. and Co-Operative Music throughout the rest of the world. The album was preceded by the Kusama EP in early 2011, named in tribute to the Japanese artist Yayoi Kusama whose work had become an inspiration to the band during the writing of their third album. Bruiser brought several more U.S. and European tours and they released a live LP, Dresden Live (recorded as the name would suggest in Dresden, Germany) for Record Store Day 2012 with a sleeve design by the British artist French. Afterwards, the band entered a two-year hiatus; during this time, Moss and Butler released new music under the moniker Roman Remains, while Betts produced for and drummed with the London band Furs.

In October 2014, the they re-grouped and working between London & Somerset they began writing a fourth LP. They again enlisted the services of producer Simon Raymonde, and in January 2015 the band began recording the new album, titled Kin, at Urchin Studios in Hackney, London, with sessions spanning a period of three weeks. The album featured guest vocals from Mark Lanegan on Wounded Wing and Sam Windett of Archie Bronson Outfit on Side By Side .

September 2015 brought with it the first Duke Spirit performance in three years at the End of the Road Festival with new bass player Rich Fownes (Bad for Lazarus, Unkle, The Eighties Matchbox B-Line Disaster) and also the first release from Kin, the song "Here Comes the Vapour". The following single, "Blue and Yellow Light", was released in November with the album itself released in 2016.

Their sixth album Sky Is Mine soon followed, in 2017. The album was produced by the band themselves in Somerset and featured guest vocal appearances from Josh T. Pearson of Lift to Experience on How Could, How Come and Duke Garwood on Broken Dream.

Since 2017 the band hasn’t released any new material but lead singer Liela Moss has been releasing solo albums a year after Sky Is Mine from 2018 onwards.

In 2025 the band got together to perform a series of sold out UK shows playing Cuts Across The Land in it's entirety, to mark 20 years since the release of the LP.

== Success ==
Initially a 'word of mouth' band, their relentless touring schedules helped them spread their music across England and beyond into America and the rest of Europe, culminating in a nomination for "Best Live Band" at the 2011 Artrocker Magazine Awards. They have played a number of high-profile support slots for Queens of the Stone Age, Yeah Yeah Yeahs, R.E.M., Black Rebel Motorcycle Club, Jane's Addiction, Supergrass, Eagles Of Death Metal and more. Since 2008, the band have performed on American and British TV multiple times, appearing on Late Show with David Letterman, Later... with Jools Holland, Late Night with Conan O'Brien, The Tonight Show with Jay Leno, Jimmy Kimmel Live!, Last Call with Carson Daly, The Henry Rollins Show and Shameless. Their song "Send a Little Love Token" was included in the fifth title in the Guitar Hero video game series and on the soundtrack of 2009 racing game Forza Motorsport 3 and their song with UNKLE Mayday was featured on the fictional radio station “Radio Broker” in the 2008 game Grand Theft Auto IV.

== Personnel ==
Current members

- Liela Moss - vocals, harmonica, piano, percussion (2003–present)
- Luke B. Ford - guitar, backing vocals, Farfisa, piano, Autoharp (2003–present)
- Toby Butler - guitar, bass guitar, backing vocals, organs, piano (2003–present)
- Olly 'The Kid' Betts - drums, glockenspiel, percussion, piano, backing vocals (2003–present)
- Rich Fownes - bass guitar (2014–present)

Former members

- Dan Higgins - guitar, autoharp (2003–2008)
- Marc Sallis - bass guitar (2008–2012)

== Discography ==
- Cuts Across the Land (2005)
- Neptune (2008)
- Bruiser (2011)
- Kin (2016)
- Sky Is Mine (2017)
