= Janus (English band) =

- Origin: Krefeld, Germany
- Genres: progressive rock
- Years active: 1969–1974; 1990–
- Labels: Harvest, EMI Electrola

Janus are an English rock band formed in Krefeld, Germany, in 1969.

== History ==
They were formed in 1969 by combining two bands and were initially named Bonthrone after the drummer Keith Bonthrone. The other members were Colin Orr (guitar/keyboards), Mick Peberdy (bass guitar), Roy Yates (classical/flamenco guitar), Bruno Lord (vocals), Derek Hyett (vocals). Yates and Hyett were British soldiers stationed in Germany. (The name of the band would later be changed on suggestion of EMI, who noted that Germans had trouble pronouncing "th" and proposed "Janus".)

Eventually they were signed by EMI Electrola (headquartered in Köln) and recorded one album, titled Gravedigger, on EMI's Harvest record label.

A couple of years later, in 1974, the band split up. There were plans for a second album, but they were not realized due to low sales of the first one.

After in 1989 Gravedigger was released on CD, Colin Orr revived the band and started releasing albums under their name.

With time, the band's only album became valuable among LP collectors and came to be considered sort of a "hidden treasure". In 2012, EMI asked Colin Orr to remix it. That reawakened Orr's activity and led to a new album titled Under the Shadow of the Moon.

== Discography ==
- Gravedigger (1972) – Harvest / EMI
  - Review in Rock Hard magazine
- Gravedigger (Re-issue Edition, 2013) – EMI Electrola GmbH
- Under the Shadow of the Moon (2013) – Harvest / EMI Music Germany GmbH & Co. KG
- Gravedigger (Hybrid, 2025) – M.I.G. Music GmbH

Moreover, Colin Orr recorded 8 or 9 albums using the band's name between 1989 and 2015.
