= The American Adventure (album) =

Studio album by The Electric Soft Parade
- Released: 13 October 2003
- Recorded: September 2002 – May 2003 at The Metway, Kemptown; 811 Studios, Cowfold; Abbey Road, London
- Genre: Indie rock
- Length: 36:20
- Label: BMG
- Producer: Alex White, Thomas White, Danton Supple

The Electric Soft Parade chronology
Holes in the Wall (2002)	The American Adventure (2003)	The Human Body EP (2005)

Singles from The American Adventure
- 1. "Things I've Done Before" Released: 15 September 2003; 2. "Lose Yr Frown" Released: 3 November 2003

Professional ratings
Review scores
Source	Rating
Allmusic	(Positive)
BBC Music	(Positive)
NME	9/10 stars
RTÉ	2/5 stars
Stylus	C−
The Guardian	4/5 stars
Yahoo! Music	7/10 stars

The American Adventure is the second album by UK prog-pop duo The Electric Soft Parade, released in 2003 on BMG UK & Ireland. The album was seen as a departure from their previous effort Holes in the Wall (DB Records, 2002) and paved the way for their third full-length LP, No Need To Be Down-Hearted.

== Critical reception ==
The American Adventure received mixed reviews upon release. Jack Rabid of Allmusic noted a distinct change of sound from that of the band's debut album, Holes in the Wall, but it was a change that he felt worked to good effect; "They abandon any semblance of their first LP's clockwork consistency for a bumpy ride of an LP that shifts gears from song to song, or mid-song abruptly but successfully throughout". He went on to draw comparisons with the baroque music of The Beach Boys and "'70s Pink Floyd comfortable numbness". Andrew McGregor writing for the BBC praised the uniqueness of The Electric Soft Parade sound, but found fault with the album's lyrical content; "there's surely no need to adopt their 'stating-the-bleeding-obvious in a Moon/June/Balloon stylee' approach. "Existing is easy, living is hard" from the otherwise fine closing track "Exist" is a cliché too far, with unfortunate echoes of "Why" by Annie Lennox." In her review for RTÉ, Anne-Louise Foley labelled the album "dull", stating that it is "nowhere as interesting as it thinks it is" and singling out "The American Adventure" as the main offender in her 2-star review; "[t]he White brothers shoot themselves in the foot with the overblown prog monstrosity that is the title track. Long and meandering (though it does manage to escape from the sound swamp near the end), it's the kind of song that only a mother or devout PR man could love." Despite her reservations about the album as a whole, she found merit in the LP's second single, "Lose Yr Frown", declaring it "the best thing on offer, with a catchy chorus that trips off Alex's guitar with an upbeat ease. It's what the young band do best and they should remember this". Stylus Magazine's Kilian Murphy thought that The American Adventure was despondently disappointing overall, citing "time spent on the road plugging their debut long-player" as the over-riding factor which had "caused the Parade to lose some of their fizz", but he also felt that the album also had its good points, too; "Thankfully, not everything on the American Adventure suffers from such despondency. Opening track "Things I've Done Before" may not let much lyrical light in (...), but it's equipped with a killer riff and a sense of momentum that is lost later in the album (...) while "Bruxellisation" is a rich, heartbreaking ballad in the Doves mould." Caroline Sullivan of The Guardian declared the album musically "adventurous" in her complimentary review, and, although the songwriting lacked uniformity, the album was a success;

Despite the plethora of ideas (...), what makes the record work is its sense of seclusion. No matter where they rove – to the muzzy fringes of psychedelia on Lose Yr Frown, on Headacheville, to matte-and-chrome places that wouldn't be out of place in an aftershave ad – it's always their private party. Frighteningly assured and self-aware, the Whites are still the Brit siblings to watch.

Josh Rogan, writing for Yahoo! Music, described The American Adventure as "a roller coaster ride well worth taking" that had "clearly been lovingly constructed and largely well executed" with "a strong sense of focus and quality control".

== Track listing ==
All tracks written by T. and A. White, unless otherwise noted.

1. "Things I've Done Before" (A. White) – 2:55
2. "Bruxellisation" – 3:28
3. "Lights Out" – 2:40
4. "The Wrongest Thing in Town" – 5:13
5. "Lose Yr Frown" (A. White) – 2:55
6. "The American Adventure" (T. White) – 6:59
7. "Chaos" (T. White) – 4:42
8. "Headacheville" – 4:01
9. "Existing" (T. White) – 3:27

== Personnel ==
=== The Electric Soft Parade ===
- Alex White – producer, arranger, vocals, guitars, bass, synth bass, piano, claps, vox continental organ, tacked piano, hammond organ, celeste, drums, reverb guitar
- Thomas White – producer, arranger, artwork, photography, drums, vocals, guitars, bass, percussion, sampler, cello, violin, claps, vox continental organ, hammond organ, akai 12-track, piano

=== Additional musicians ===
- Stephen Large – piano, hammond organ
- Debbie Ball – guitars
- Alex Miller – violin
- Monster Bobby – q-chord, groovebox
- Phil Sumner – cornet
- Sebastian McNulty – spoken word

=== Technical personnel ===
- Danton Supple – co-producer, mixer
- Nick Webb – mastering
- Mervyn Penrose – sleeve assembly
- Marc Beatty – violin recording
- Al Scott – vocal recording, edits
