= No Need to Be Downhearted =

Studio album by The Electric Soft Parade
- Released: 24 April 2007
- Recorded: Truck
- Genre: Indie rock
- Length: 48:54
- Label: Truck, Better Looking
- Producer: The Electric Soft Parade

The Electric Soft Parade chronology
The Human Body EP (2005)	No Need to Be Downhearted (2007)	Idiots (2013)

Professional ratings
Aggregate scores
Source	Rating
Metacritic	70/100
Review scores
Source	Rating
Allmusic	3.5/5 stars
The Line of Best Fit	78%
Yahoo! Music	Favourable

No Need to Be Downhearted is an album by The Electric Soft Parade, released in 2007. The first single was "If That's the Case, Then I Don't Know".

The album was named after a lyric from The Fall's song "15 Ways" from their album Middle Class Revolt.

== Production ==
Unlike previous releases, the album was self-produced and recorded entirely digitally, using a demo version of ProTools, lending the album a hard, brittle sound. Compared to the relatively restrained arrangement and mix of earlier work, the album is richly layered - at times cluttered and busy - a result of the bands' trademark 'loose over-dubbing' (a technique whereby any given melody is partly or wholly improvised, then double-tracked approximately, often giving the track in question a slightly out-of-focus, seasick quality). The LP also features wide use of sampled Mellotron and MIDI percussion, mostly filtered through heavy reverb and compression. On release, reviewers also noted the synth-like sounds on many tracks. In fact, a large portion of the guitars on the album were DI'd (plugging the guitar lead directly into the desk rather than mic'ing an amplifier). The gain on the channel would then be turned up full, resulting in a saturated, squarewave-like tone.

== Track listing ==
1. "No Need to Be Downhearted (Part 1)" – 2:04
2. "Life in the Backseat" – 3:08
3. "Woken by a Kiss" – 5:57
4. "If That's the Case, Then I Don't Know" – 4:57
5. "Shore Song/Surfacing" – 4:25
6. "Misunderstanding" – 3:37
7. "Secrets" – 3:46
8. "Cold World/Starry Nite #1" – 5:32
9. "Have You Ever Felt Like It's Too Late?" – 3:28
10. "Come Back Inside" – 3:50
11. "Appropriate Ending" – 3:01
12. "No Need to Be Downhearted (Part 2)" – 5:12
