= Flood (Headswim album) =

Studio album by Headswim
- Released: 24 October 1994
- Studio: Rockfield Studios, Wales
- Genre: Alternative rock, grunge
- Label: Epic
- Producer: Dave Eringa

Headswim chronology
| Tense Moments (1994) | Flood (1994) | Despite Yourself (1997) |

Singles from Flood
- 1. "Gone to Pot" Released: 1 August 1994; 2. "Soup" Released: October 1994; 3. "Crawl" Released: 20 February 1995

Flood is the 1994 debut full-length album by the English rock band Headswim, released on 24 October 1994 on Epic Records. Originally titled Precipity Flood, it was recorded over three weeks at Rockfield Studios in Wales, with Dave Eringa producing. The album included three singles, "Gone to Pot", "Soup", and "Crawl".

== Critical reception ==
Professional ratings
Review scores
| Source | Rating |
|---|---|
| AllMusic | 3/5 stars |
| Kerrang! | 4/5 stars |
| Q | 3/5 stars |

David Sinclair of Q said, "Headswim have harnessed a big, abrasive rock guitar sound and produced a debut of some promise".

== Track listing ==
Flood
| No. | Title | Lyrics | Music | Length |
|---|---|---|---|---|
| 1. | "Gone to Pot" | D. Glendining | Headswim | 4:41 |
| 2. | "Soup" | D. Glendining | D. Glendining/N. Watts | 3:11 |
| 3. | "Try Disappointed" | D. Glendining | D. Glendining/N. Watts | 3:51 |
| 4. | "Crawl" | D. Glendining | D. Glendining/N. Watts | 3:57 |
| 5. | "Dead" | D. Glendining/N. Watts | D. Glendining/N. Watts | 5:14 |
| 6. | "Years on Me" | D. Glendining | D. Glendining | 2:55 |
| 7. | "Apple of My Eye" | D. Glendining | Headswim | 4:17 |
| 8. | "Down" | D. Glendining | Headswim | 3:58 |
| 9. | "Stinkhorn" | D. Glendining | D. Glendining/C. Taylor | 2:27 |
| 10. | "Safe Harvest" | D. Glendining | Headswim | 6:28 |
| 11. | "Beneath a Black Moon" | D. Glendining | D. Glendining/N. Watts | 15:18 |

- "Beneath a Black Moon" finishes at 3:36, and a hidden track begins at 11:05.

== Personnel ==
Headswim

- Daniel Glendining
- Tom Glendining
- Clovis Taylor
- Nick Watts

Additional personnel

- Cheryl Enever – cello on "Years on Me"
- John Hoare – trumpet on "Stinkhorn"

Production

- Dave Eringa – producer, engineer, mixing
- Phil Alt – assistant engineer, assistant mixing
- Richard Flack – assistant mixing
- Matt Glendining – artwork, photography
