= Coconut (Archie Bronson Outfit album) =

Studio album by Archie Bronson Outfit
- Released: 1 March 2010
- Genre: Alternative rock
- Length: 40:05
- Label: Domino
- Producers: Tim Goldsworthy and Archie Bronson Outfit

Archie Bronson Outfit chronology
Derdang Derdang (2006)	Coconut (2010)

Professional ratings
Review scores
Source	Rating
AllMusic	link
BBC	link
Daily Music Guide	(average) link
Drowned in Sound	link
The Fly	link
Gigwise	link
God Is in the TV Zine	link
The Independent	link
Lazy Brighton	(6.4/10) link
The Music Fix	link
MusicOMH	link
NME	link
Pitchfork	link
The Quietus	link
The Skinny	link
Subba Cultcha	(favourable) link

Coconut is the third full-length album by London-based band Archie Bronson Outfit and was released on 1 March 2010.

"Shark's Tooth" was the first single from the album and was released on 22 February 2010. Initial copies of Coconut featured an accompanying DVD of videos for each track on the album.

== Track listing ==
1. "Magnetic Warrior"
2. "Shark's Tooth"
3. "Hoola"
4. "Wild Strawberries"
5. "Chunk"
6. "You Have a Right to a Mountain Life / One up on Yourself"
7. "Bite It & Believe It"
8. "Hunt You Down"
9. "Harness (Bliss)"
10. "Run Gospel Singer"

== Singles ==
- "Shark's Tooth" (22 February 2010, Domino Records)
- "Hoola" (28 June 2010, Domino Records)
- "Chunk" (19 October 2010, Domino Records)
