= Duke Garwood =

British musician

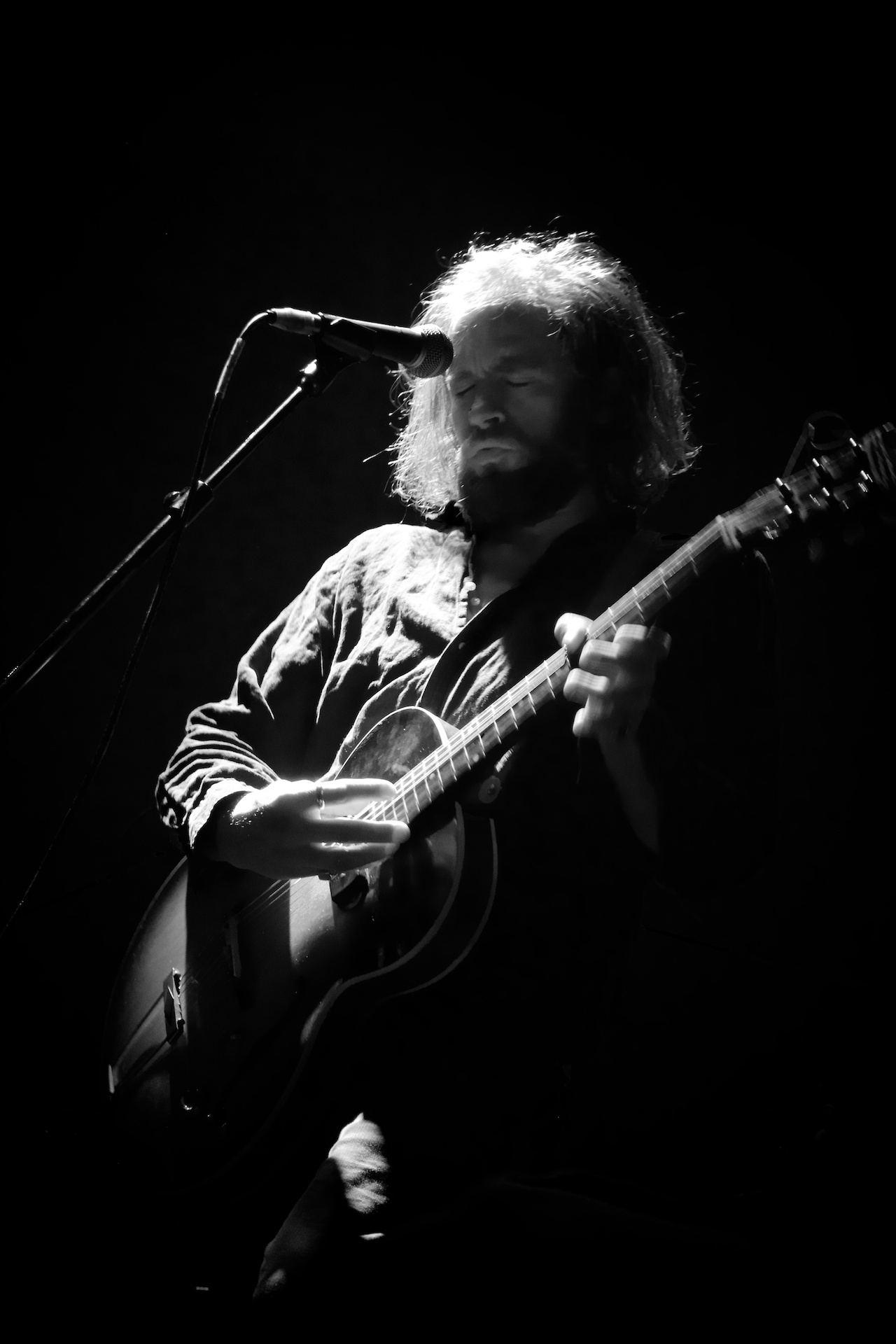

Background information
- Genres: Blues rock, experimental
- Occupation: Singer-songwriter
- Instrument: Multi-instrumentalist
- Labels: Fire Records, Heavenly, Ipecac
- Website: dukegarwood.co.uk

Duke Garwood (born 1969) is a British multi-instrumentalist from London.

== Biography ==
Duke Garwood has released six studio albums: Holy Week, Emerald Palace, The Sand That Falls, Dreamboatsafari, Heavy Love, and Garden of Ashes.

He also played guitar on The Orb's single "Perpetual Dawn," appeared on the first two albums (Fur and Derdang Derdang) of the rock band Archie Bronson Outfit on clarinet and rhaita (a Moroccan reed instrument), and most recently played guitar on Mark Lanegan's album Blues Funeral and clarinet on Savages' album Silence Yourself, among many other guest appearances.

In 2011, Garwood collaborated with artist Shezad Dawood in the concert performance 'New Dream Machine Project', which resumed the 1968 recording of Brian Jones of The Rolling Stones and Master Musicians of Jajouka. The new generation of "Master Musicians" and Garwood recreated that moment around the three-metre tall Dreamachine, originally invented by Brion Gysin and created for the occasion by Dawood.

In February 2013, Ipecac and Heavenly announced the signing of Duke Garwood & Mark Lanegan. Lanegan described Garwood as "one of his all time favorite artists" and working with him as "one of the best experiences of his recording life". Their debut collaboration album Black Pudding was released in May 2013.

After a successful collaboration with Mark Lanegan, Heavenly announced it had signed Garwood in November 2014 and his next solo album Heavy Love would be released through the label on 9 February 2015. On Lanegan's 2017 US tour, Garwood performed as the opening act, as well as a sideman in Lanegan's band.

In 2021, Garwood featured in Morcheeba’s song “The Edge Of The World” which is the last song of their album Blackest Blue.

== Discography ==
=== Albums ===
- Holy Week (Loog Records, 2005)
- Emerald Palace (Butterfly Recordings, 2006)
- The Sand That Falls (Fire Records, 2009)
- Dreamboatsafari (Fire Records, 2011)
- Black Pudding w/ Mark Lanegan (Heavenly Records / Ipecac, 2013)
- Heavy Love (Heavenly Records, 2015)
- Garden of Ashes (Heavenly Records, 2017)
- With Animals w/ Mark Lanegan (Heavenly Records, 2018)
- Last Party On Earth 2021
- Rogues Gospel (God Unknown Records, 2022)

=== Other releases ===
- Sweet Back (Loog Records, 2005) – 7" single
- Keep Mother Vol.6 (Fire Records, 2006) – split 10" single w/ HTRK
- He Was a Warlock (Fire Records, 2009) – EP
- Duke/Wand (Fire Records, 2012) – split 12" LP w/ Wooden Wand
- Cold Molly (Heavenly Records, 2013) – 10" Record Store Day Release (limited edition of 300) w/ Mark Lanegan
- Needle of Death/Fresh as a Sweet Sunday Morning (Heavenly Records, 2015) - 7" Record Store Day Release (limited edition of 300) w/ Mark Lanegan
