= Neptune (The Duke Spirit album) =

Studio album by The Duke Spirit
- Released: 4 February 2008
- Recorded: 2007
- Genre: Garage rock
- Label: You Are Here; Shangri-La Music
- Producer: Chris Goss

The Duke Spirit chronology
Ex-Voto (2007)	Neptune (2008)	Bruiser (2011)

Professional ratings
Review scores
Source	Rating
AllMusic	4/5 stars
Drowned in Sound	6/10
The Guardian	3/5 stars
Pitchfork Media	6.2/10
This Is Fake DIY	3.5/5 stars

Neptune is the second studio album by the London-based band The Duke Spirit. It was the last with the original lead guitarist, Dan Higgins. The album was released on 4 February 2008 on the independent label You Are Here.

The song "Lassoo" is used in the game Guitar Hero On Tour: Modern Hits for North America and the UK, and "Send a Little Love Token" is on the main set list for Guitar Hero 5 and Forza Motorsport 3.

== Critical reception ==
The Independent praised Liela Moss, writing that she possesses "not just a powerful set of pipes but also the spirit to duke it out (so to speak) with a rock band playing full-tilt at full volume." Spin wrote that "these Brits move with purpose from girl-group-inspired pop ('My Sunken Treasure') to fully loaded Jesus and Mary Chain–fried fuzz ('Lassoo') in remarkably short steps." The Times wrote that "well-crafted pop songs with an art-rock bent are the mainstay."

== Track listing ==
All tracks are written by Liela Moss & Toby Butler except as noted.

No.	Title	Writer(s)	Length
1.	"I Do Believe"	Moss	0:43
2.	"Send a Little Love Token"		2:38
3.	"The Step and the Walk"	Luke Ford, Moss	3:22
4.	"Dog Roses"	Dan Higgins, Moss	3:17
5.	"Into the Fold"		2:49
6.	"This Ship Was Built to Last"		3:50
7.	"Wooden Heart"	Ford	4:43
8.	"You Really Wake Up the Love in Me"	Ford, Moss	2:42
9.	"My Sunken Treasure"		3:57
10.	"Lassoo"		2:59
11.	"Neptune's Call"	Higgins, Moss	2:46
12.	"Sovereign"	Higgins, Moss	3:29
