= Cuts Across the Land =

Cuts Across The Land

Studio album by The Duke Spirit
- Released: May 2005
- Recorded: 2004
- Genre: Garage rock
- Length: 45:27
- Label: Loog

The Duke Spirit chronology
Cuts Across The Land (2005)	Ex-Voto (2007)

Professional ratings
Review scores
Source	Rating
AllMusic	4/5 stars
Alternative Press	4/5 stars
The Guardian	3/5 stars
NME	(7/10)
Pitchfork Media	(7.4/10)
PopMatters	(7/10)
Prefix	4/5 stars
URB	4/5 stars

Cuts Across the Land is the first album by the English indie rock band The Duke Spirit. It was released in the United Kingdom in May 2005. It reached #40 in the UK Albums Chart.

== Critical reception ==
Drowned in Sound called the album "at times sensational, but so often so-near-so-far." The Times called it "that most precious thing: a debut album that triumphantly, emphatically lives up to the promise of the clutch of singles and EPs that preceded it, and the thundering live shows that their charismatic singer, Leila Moss, takes command of so imperiously."

== Track listing ==
All lyrics are written by Liela Moss.

UK release (Loog Records, 2005)
No.	Title	Music	Length
1.	"Cuts Across the Land"	Toby Butler	3:11
2.	"Stubborn Stitches"	Butler	3:20
3.	"Darling, You're Mean"	Luke Ford	3:58
4.	"Win Your Love"	Ford	3:14
5.	"Hello to the Floor"	Ford	4:35
6.	"Bottom of the Sea"	Ford	4:09
7.	"Fades the Sun"	Dan Higgins	2:48
8.	"You Were Born Inside My Heart"	Butler	3:21
9.	"Lion Rip"	Butler	2:37
10.	"Lovetones"	Ford	4:01
11.	"Love Is an Unfamiliar Name"	Butler	2:34
12.	"Red Weather"	Ford	4:43

UK Bonus Track
No.	Title	Music	Length
13.	"Dark Is Light Enough"	Butler, Ford	3:02

US release (Star Time International Records, 2006)
No.	Title	Length
1.	"Cuts Across the Land"	3:11
2.	"Love Is an Unfamiliar Name"	3:20
3.	"Darling, You're Mean"	3:58
4.	"Win Your Love"	3:14
5.	"Hello to the Floor"	4:35
6.	"Bottom of the Sea"	4:09
7.	"Fades the Sun"	2:48
8.	"You Were Born Inside My Heart"	3:21
9.	"Lion Rip"	2:37
10.	"Lovetones"	4:01
11.	"Stubborn Stitches"	2:34
12.	"Red Weather"	4:43

== Souvenirs ==
The 'Special Edition' UK release included a bonus disc of exclusive rarities, titled in the sleeve notes as Souvenirs – A Bonus Album and on the disc itself as Rarities Album. It comprised ten additional tracks, made up of demos and radio sessions.

No.	Title	Length
1.	"Scratching Around" (demo)	3:19
2.	"So Good To Hear" (demo)	4:40
3.	"Patients" (demo)	3:13
4.	"Wooden Heart" (demo)	4:27
5.	"The Heart Is A Lonely Hunter" (demo)	3:43
6.	"Hello To The Floor" (Radio 1 Lamacq Live session track)	4:17
7.	"Lion Rip" (Virgin Razorcuts session track)	2:13
8.	"Cuts Across The Land" (XFM session track)	3:15
9.	"Win Your Love" (Virgin Razorcuts session track)	3:06
10.	"Dark Is Light Enough" (XFM session track)	4:28
