= Brakes (band) =

English rock band

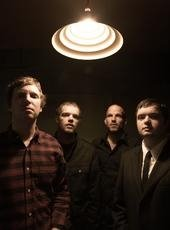

Background information
- Also known as: brakesbrakesbrakes
- Origin: Brighton, England
- Genres: Indie rock, post-punk revival, country
- Years active: 2003–2009, 2015, 2026
- Labels: Rough Trade Records; FatCat Records
- Members: Eamon Hamilton; Thomas White; Marc Beatty; Alex White

Brakes were an English rock band, formed in 2003 in Brighton. The band consisted of vocalist/guitarist Eamon Hamilton, lead guitarist Thomas White, bassist Marc Beatty and drummer Alex White. They reformed in 2015 and 2026 for short runs of live shows.

The band were known as Brakesbrakesbrakes in the United States, to avoid possible confusion with the Philadelphia band The Brakes.

== Biography ==
Brakes formed in 2003, when Thomas White and Alex White of The Electric Soft Parade saw Eamon Hamilton perform a solo gig supporting The Lonesome Organist in Brighton. Marc Beatty of Mockin' Bird Studio and The Tenderfoot (who also worked with British Sea Power, engineering their debut single and recording tracks for their debut album) was also soon recruited, and the band set about recording their debut single, "Pick Up the Phone", which was released on Tugboat Records in 2004. Shortly after forming Brakes, Hamilton was asked by British Sea Power to play keyboards with them, a position he held for three years.

Brakes toured extensively, and in early 2005, recorded their debut album, Give Blood, for Rough Trade Records, at Metropolis Studio, with producer Iain Gore. The album was released in July of the same year. They recorded and mixed the 16-track album in seven days. The album was released by Rough Trade Records to great critical acclaim, achieving five stars from The Observer Music Monthly, Time Out and from many websites, and was voted the best album of 2005 by the influential Rough Trade Shops.

Brakes toured with Belle & Sebastian in January and February 2006, Editors in February/March 2006 and The Killers in November 2006, as well as playing several European and UK headline tours of their own. The touring commitments of Brakes made it impossible for Hamilton to continue playing with British Sea Power, and he amicably left the band in 2006.

Brakes recorded their second album, The Beatific Visions at House of David Studio in Nashville, co-producing the record with Grammy Award-winning producer Stuart Sikes. Whilst recording the album, the band convinced the studio's owner, David Briggs, who had played with Elvis Presley between 1965 and 1977, to play piano on their song "If I Should Die Tonight". It was the first time Briggs had played on an album for three years.

The album was released in the UK in November 2006. BBC Radio 1's Colin Murray hailed it as his album of the year, Rough Trade Shops voted it number four in their Best Albums of 2006, and it received four and five star reviews from many publications and websites. The album was released in the United States in February 2007 by Worlds Fair Records. The band were forced to change their name to "BrakesBrakesBrakes" in the US due to a Philadelphian funk rock band using the name The Brakes. While the album was released under the name BrakesBrakesBrakes in the US, the band will continue to use their original name throughout the rest of the world.

Brakes returned to North America in May and June 2007 for a sold-out headline tour of the US and Canada. Whilst they were on tour, their song "All Night Disco Party" was used in the hit television show Ugly Betty which gained them a wider audience.

Brakes recorded their third studio album, Touchdown, at Chem 19, Hamilton, with Paul Savage (formerly of Glaswegian band The Delgados). It was released by Fat Cat Records on 20 April 2009.

== Discography ==
=== Albums ===
Title	Album details	Peak chart positions	
Title	Album details	UK	UK Indie
Give Blood	Released: 4 July 2005; Label: Rough Trade (#RTRAD228); Formats: CD, LP	—	—
The Beatific Visions	Released: 6 November 2006; Label: Rough Trade (#RTRAD428); Formats: CD, LP	180	8
Touchdown	Released: 20 April 2009; Label: FatCat (#FAT86); Formats: CD, LP	—	28
Rock Is Dodelijk (Live album)	Released: 2 November 2009; Label: FatCat (#FAT90); Formats: CD	—	—
"—" denotes items that did not chart or were not released in that territory.

=== Singles ===
Year	Title	Peak chart positions			Album
Year	Title	UK	UK Indie	SCO	Album
2004	"Pick Up the Phone"	82	17	87	Give Blood
2005	"All Night Disco Party"	67	—	—	Give Blood
2005	"Ring a Ding Ding"	86	15	77	Give Blood
2006	"All Night Disco Party" (remix)	76	4	41	Give Blood
2006	"Hold Me in the River"	—	—	—	The Beatific Visions
2007	"Cease and Desist"	—	—	—	The Beatific Visions
2007	"Beatific Visions"	—	—	—	The Beatific Visions
2009	"Hey Hey"	—	9	—	Touchdown
"—" denotes items that did not chart or were not released in that territory.
