= Holes in the Wall =

Studio album by The Electric Soft Parade
- Released: 4 February 2002
- Recorded: 811 Sound, Cowfold; ARC, Bath; Mockin' Bird, Brighton; Raezor, Wandsworth; River, Battersea; Tom White's bedroom
- Genre: Psychedelic pop
- Length: 55:42
- Label: db Records
- Producers: The Electric Soft Parade, Chris Hughes, Mark Frith

The Electric Soft Parade chronology
Holes in the Wall (2002)	The American Adventure (2003)

Singles from Holes in the Wall
- 1. "Silent to the Dark" / "Something's Got to Give" Released: 30 April 2001; 2. "Empty at the End" / "Sumatran" Released: 23 July 2001; 3. "There's a Silence" Released: 29 October 2001; 4. "Silent to the Dark II" Released: 4 March 2002; 5. "Empty at the End" / "This Given Line" Released: 20 May 2002; 6. "Same Way, Every Day (Biting the Soles of My Feet)" Released: 30 September 2002

Holes in the Wall is the debut studio album by The Electric Soft Parade, released on 4 February 2002. The album was released by db Records and was nominated for the Mercury Music Prize. The album features a wide array of sounds, ranging from hard-edged guitar rock (namely "Start Again" and "Why Do You Try So Hard to Hate Me"), anthemic pop (the epic "Silent to the Dark"), and somber acoustic tracks like "It's Wasting Me Away".

== Singles ==
In the UK, there were several singles released. Prior to the album's release, the band issued the double A-side singles "Silent to the Dark"/"Something's Got to Give" on 30 April 2001, "Empty at the End"/"Sumatran" on 23 July 2001, and "There's a Silence" (with the B-sides "On the Wires" and "Broadcast") on 29 October 2001. "There's a Silence" reached number 52 on the UK Singles Chart.

After the album's release, a new version of "Silent to the Dark" (entitled "Silent to the Dark II" and mixed by Danton Supple) was released on 4 March 2002, and reached number 23 on the UK Singles Chart. Another double A-side single, "Empty at the End"/"This Given Line", was released on 20 May 2002 and charted at number 39 in the UK. The album's final single, "Biting the Soles of My Feet" (titled on the single as "Same Way, Every Day (Biting the Soles of My Feet)"), was released on 30 September 2002 and did not chart in the UK.

== Reception ==
Professional ratings
Aggregate scores
Source	Rating
Metacritic	73/100
Review scores
Source	Rating
AllMusic	4/5 stars
NME	9/10
Pitchfork	7.0/10

Upon its release, Holes in the Wall received some critical acclaim. At Metacritic, which assigns a weighted average score out of 100 to reviews and ratings from mainstream critics, the album has received a score of 73, based on 9 reviews, indicating "generally favorable reviews". AllMusic reviewer Lee Meyer awarded the album four out of five stars, and stated that "one of the album's greatest virtues is its memorable melodies, as exemplified in the catchy choruses of songs like 'Empty at the End' and 'Silent to the Dark'." Meyer further hailed, "The White brothers also have ear-catching production on their side, giving their album true flavor by infusing it with splashes of electronics and keyboards, psychedelic swirl, and the occasional irregular time signature."

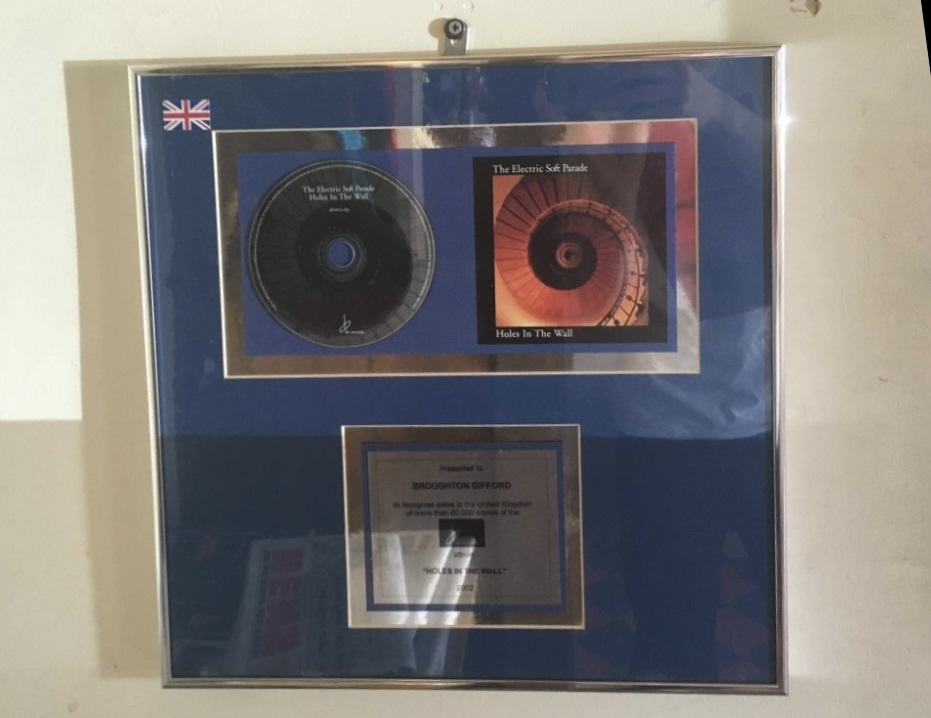
A silver disc for Holes in the Wall (denoting sales of over 60,000 copies) on display in Broughton Gifford, Wiltshire

== Track listings ==
Standard CD album
No.	Title	Writer(s)	Length
1.	"Start Again"	Alex White	3:54
2.	"Empty at the End"	Tom White	3:01
3.	"There's a Silence"	Alex White	2:52
4.	"Something's Got to Give"	Tom White	3:49
5.	"It's Wasting Me Away"	Alex White	4:17
6.	"Silent to the Dark"	Tom White	9:00
7.	"Sleep Alone"	Tom White	4:09
8.	"This Given Line"	Tom White	4:12
9.	"Why Do You Try So Hard to Hate Me"	Tom & Alex White	4:38
10.	"Holes in the Wall"	Tom White	5:14
11.	"Biting the Soles of My Feet"	Tom White	6:25
12.	"Red Balloon for Me"	Tom White	4:12

=== Vinyl track listing ===
SIDE A

1. "This Given Line" – 4:12
2. "Empty at the End" – 3:01
3. "Something's Got to Give" – 3:49
4. "There's a Silence" – 2:52

SIDE B

1. "It's Wasting Me Away" – 4:17
2. "Silent to the Dark" – 9:00

SIDE C

1. "Sleep Alone" – 4:09
2. "Why Do You Try So Hard to Hate Me" – 4:38
3. "Holes in the Wall" – 5:14

SIDE D

1. "Biting the Soles of My Feet" – 6:25
2. "Red Balloon for Me" – 4:12

== Personnel ==
Musicians

- Tom White – vocals, guitar, bass, drums, drum machine, synthesizer, piano, violin
- Alex White – vocals, guitar, bass, drum machine, synthesizer, piano
- Chris Hughes – occasional percussion
- Mark Frith – bass (tracks 3 and 11), shaker (track 10)
- Cliff Jones – backing vocals (track 12)

Production and technical

- Produced by The Electric Soft Parade, Chris Hughes, and Mark Frith
- Recorded by Mark Frith
- Tracks 6 and 12 recorded by Tom White and Mark Frith
- Mixed by Tim Oliver (tracks 2, 4 to 7, and 9 to 12), Danton Supple (tracks 1, 8, and 9), and Mark Frith (tracks 1, 2, 3, and 8)
- Centre and back cover photography by Steve Gullick
- Photo collage by Tom White
