= Heavy Love (Duke Garwood album) =

Studio album by Duke Garwood
- Released: 15 February 2015
- Genre: Blues
- Length: 41:08
- Label: Heavenly Recordings

Duke Garwood chronology
Black Pudding (2013)	Heavy Love (2015)

Professional ratings
Aggregate scores
Source	Rating
Metacritic	76/100
Review scores
Source	Rating
AllMusic	4/5 stars

Heavy Love is a studio album by English musician Duke Garwood. It was released in February 2015 under Heavenly Recordings.

== Reception ==
At Metacritic, which assigns a weighted average score out of 100 to reviews from mainstream critics, Heavy Love received an average score of 76% based on 11 reviews, indicating "generally favorable reviews".

== Track listing ==
No.	Title	Length
1.	"Some Times"	4:16
2.	"Heavy Love"	4:00
3.	"Burning Seas"	3:47
4.	"Disco Lights"	4:09
5.	"Sweet Wine"	3:24
6.	"Snake Man"	3:27
7.	"Suppertime in Hell"	4:49
8.	"Honey in My Ear"	3:56
9.	"Roses"	3:13
10.	"Hawaiian Death Ballad"	6:07

== Charts ==
Chart (2015)	Peak position
Belgian Albums (Ultratop Flanders)	196
Dutch Albums (Album Top 100)	89
