= He Was a Warlock =

Studio album by Duke Garwood
- Released: 25 May 2009
- Genre: Rock
- Length: 14:57
- Label: Fire Records

Duke Garwood chronology
Emerald Palace (2007)	He Was a Warlock (2009)	The Sand That Falls (2009)

He Was a Warlock is an EP by the English multi-instrumentalist Duke Garwood. It was released by Fire Records on 25 May 2009.

== Track listing ==
No.	Title	Length
1.	"Havin Had You"	2:53
2.	"Rise a Woman (Reprise)"	3:25
3.	"Sound is My Fruit"	2:07
4.	"Each Man Sparkles"	2:40
5.	"He Was a Warlock"	3:52
