= Despite Yourself =

Studio album by Headswim
- Released: 2 September 1997
- Recorded: May 1996 – January 1997
- Studio: Wool Hall Studios, Bath, England
- Genre: Alternative rock
- Length: 49:23
- Label: Epic
- Producer: Steve Osborne

Headswim chronology
Flood (1994)	Despite Yourself (1997)

Alternative cover
- UK album cover

Singles from Despite Yourself
- 1. "Tourniquet" Released: 9 February 1998; 2. "Better Made" Released: 11 May 1998

Despite Yourself is the second and final studio album by the English rock band Headswim. The album was released by Epic Records on 2 September 1997 in the US, and on 18 May 1998 in the UK and the rest of Europe, and spawned two singles for the band, "Tourniquet" and "Better Made". The album's musical style showed a marked change from the hard rock/grunge of the band's earlier work towards a more personal, alternative rock sound (partly influenced by the death of the Glendinings' brother Matthew from leukaemia in 1994), which drew comparisons to Radiohead.

Although the album reached number 24 in the UK Albums Chart and the first single "Tourniquet" made the top 30 of the UK Singles Chart, Despite Yourself did not sell as well as hoped and Epic dropped the band soon after its release.

== Critical reception ==
Professional ratings
Review scores
Source	Rating
AllMusic	4.5/5 stars
The Independent	2/5 stars
Melody Maker	2.5/5 stars
NME	7/10
Q	4/5 stars

The album received mixed views from the music press. Q observed that "the marriage of paradoxically exhilarating examinations of despair and self-doubt to open-ended stadia rock recalls Radiohead". AllMusic also noted the similarities to Radiohead but stated that the album "fortunately boasts enough strong individual material to prevent the record from being a mere acknowledgement of trendy influences... Too derivative for lofty praise or emphatic recommendation, Despite Yourself is an exquisite exercise in catharsis and musical tribute nonetheless." NME was positive, calling Despite Yourself "a mighty album; a record that drags you under with its spectacularly gloomy sentiments of self-loathing and utter despair only to redress the balance with swathes of dynamic guitar bruising and seductive studio inventiveness". The review noted that while the record displayed more musical variety than the debut album, "at heart, however, Headswim are still a battle-weary rock band. It's just this time they're tackling life's obstacles with reaffirmed vigour and some nifty production. British rock has never sounded so (un)healthy."

Ben Myers of Melody Maker was less impressed, stating, "What the Essex four-piece do is almost bland beyond belief ... It's a place where anthemic choruses are lavished with occasionally naff lyrics and very occasional hints of greatness." Music Week praised the album's lead single but went on to say, "Despite Yourself doesn't contain any tracks as refreshing as 'Tourniquet', but remains a credible record".

== Track listing ==
All tracks are written by Headswim, except where noted.

No.	Title	Length
1.	"Tourniquet"	4:16
2.	"Hype"	3:54
3.	"Years on Me" (D. Glendining)	2:54
4.	"Clinging to the Wreckage"	4:37
5.	"Better Made"	4:55
6.	"Wishing I Was Naïve"	4:35
7.	"Old Angel Midnight"	3:50
8.	"Holy Ghost" (C. Taylor)	3:11
9.	"Burnt Out Shell of Bliss"	4:02
10.	"Devil in My Palm"	4:17
11.	"Moving On"	4:17
12.	"Brother"	4:36
Total length:		49:23

== Personnel ==
Headswim

- Daniel Glendining – vocals, guitar
- Tom Glendining – drums
- Clovis Taylor – bass
- Nick Watts – keyboards, cello

Additional musicians

- Catherine Browning – violin
- Ian Burdge – cello
- Matthew Taylor – violin
- Rebecca Ware – viola
- Cheryl Enever – cello
- Michael Gray – violin
- Vincent Greene – viola
- Adrian Smith – violin

Technical personnel

- Steve Osborne – producer, mixer
- Adrian Bushby – recording and mix engineer
- Stylorouge – sleeve design
- Chris Floyd – photography
