= Headswim =

English alternative rock band

Background information
- Origin: Essex, England
- Genres: Alternative rock, grunge
- Years active: 1992–2001, 2022
- Labels: Crush; Epic; Pet Sounds; Trapped Animal
- Members: Daniel Glendining; Tom Glendining; Clovis Taylor; Nick Watts
- Website: headswim.co.uk

Headswim are an English alternative rock band active during the 1990s, best known for their 1997 single "Tourniquet". Band members subsequently went on to projects including BlackCar, Tenebrous Liar and Mew.

== History ==
The band originally formed in 1989 in Essex, England under the name Blinder. The initial line-up was Daniel Glendining (guitar/vocals), his brother Tom Glendining (drums), Nick Watts (keyboards/backing vocals) and Matt Pegg (bass guitar). The band's main influences were grunge and progressive rock and their most successful concerts were two support slots for It Bites in 1989 (one of which was to a capacity audience at the Hammersmith Odeon). Following Pegg's departure Blinder rethought their approach, reducing the progressive rock elements in their music. Pegg was replaced as bass player by a friend of the band, Clovis Taylor and, by 1992, Blinder had changed their name to Headswim.

Headswim's first releases were two four-track EPs, Tense Nervous Head and Moment of Union, on their own Crush Records label (the eight songs from the two EPs would later be compiled and released as the mini-album Tense Moments). The EPs made enough of an impression for them to be signed by the Sony Music subsidiary Epic Records in an eight-album deal and they released their debut album Flood in 1994. The album's third single "Crawl" made the UK Singles Chart and the band embarked on their first extensive tour of the UK and Europe. However, the death later that year of Dan and Tom's brother Matthew (who had created all of the band's album artwork up to this point) after a long battle with leukaemia had a profound effect on the group, who took time off to regroup.

Headswim re-emerged in 1997 with their second album Despite Yourself, which contained many cathartic songs about death and spirituality. The group's music had also shifted from their earlier grunge influences to a more reflective alternative rock sound, more akin to artists such as Radiohead and Jeff Buckley. The lead single "Tourniquet" reached the top 30 in the UK and was a minor radio hit in the United States. Soon after, the band supported Kula Shaker on a US tour. However, sales of the album did not live up to expectations. Headswim began recording a third album, but after two attempts at recording it the band were still unhappy with the results, and concerned at the rising costs, Sony made the decision to pull the album and drop the band. As of 2022, the album remains unreleased. Subsequently, Headswim released only one further single, "Dusty Road", in 2000 on the independent record label Pet Sounds in the UK, before splitting up in early 2001.

Following the group's split, Daniel Glendining formed a new band, BlackCar, essentially a solo project with occasional contributions from other musicians. BlackCar released two albums, BlackCar (2004) and Last Scene Rushes (2010), before going on hiatus. Natalie Imbruglia recorded a version of BlackCar's song "Come On Home" for her UK number-one album Counting Down the Days. Glendining also composes music for film scores, having composed the instrumental score for Lindy Heymann's 2010 low-budget British film, Kicks and contributing two tracks to the soundtrack of French television series Ainsi soient-ils. Tom Glendining also played drums for BlackCar while also a member of another band, Tenebrous Liar. In February 2011 it was announced that Dan would be joining his brother Tom in Tenebrous Liar as their new guitarist while continuing to work as BlackCar. Nick Watts became a graphic designer, but is still involved in the music business as he plays keyboards for the Danish alternative rock band Mew when they are on tour.

In May 2022, record label Trapped Animal announced that they would release a deluxe version of Flood on 7 October 2022, featuring the original album along with an extra disc of outtakes from the Flood sessions and session tracks recorded for the BBC Radio 1 Rock Show. The band also reunited to play a one-off gig at the Camden Underworld on the day of release of the reissue of Flood, where they played the album in its entirety. Speaking to Classic Rock ahead of the gig, bassist Clovis Taylor refused to rule out future activity from the band.

== Discography ==
=== Studio albums ===
- Flood (1994)
- Despite Yourself (1997) - UK No. 24

=== EPs ===
- Tense Nervous Head (1993)
- Moment of Union (1994)
  - combined and released as the mini-album Tense Moments (1994)

=== Singles ===
- "Gone to Pot" (1994)
- "Soup" (1994)
- "Crawl" (1995) - UK No. 64
- "Tourniquet" (1997 in USA, 1998 in UK & Europe) - UK No. 30
- "Better Made" (1998) - UK No. 42
- "Dusty Road" (2000)

(highest UK chart positions taken from "British Hit Singles & Albums")
