= The Sand That Falls =

Studio album by Duke Garwood
- Released: 10 August 2009
- Genre: Blues
- Length: 37:49
- Label: Fire Records

Duke Garwood chronology
He Was a Warlock (2009)	The Sand That Falls (2009)	Dreamboatsafari (2011)

Professional ratings
Review scores
Source	Rating
Drowned in Sound	7/10
The Skinny	3/5 stars

The Sand That Falls is the third studio album by the English multi-instrumentalist Duke Garwood. It was released by Fire Records in 2009.

== Critical reception ==
The Line of Best Fit wrote that "this album falls awfully short and in turn would not sound out of place at an English Yoga club, replacing the mournful Whale cries usually heard within, with the unremittingly dull tone of both Garwood's guitar and voice."

== Track listing ==
No.	Title	Length
1.	"May I Rumble"	2:28
2.	"Mellow Trucker Lady"	3:02
3.	"Confidence Makes Love"	4:46
4.	"I Bared My Chest"	5:10
5.	"Reap the Many Fruits"	5:28
6.	"The Horror"	2:06
7.	"Ho Diddi"	3:08
8.	"Deep in the Outside"	2:39
9.	"We Make the Leap"	2:37
10.	"The Sand That Falls"	6:25
