= Emerald Palace =

Studio album by Duke Garwood
- Released: 27 March 2007
- Genre: Blues
- Length: 38:50
- Label: Butterfly Recordings
- Producer: Duke Garwood, Paul May, Simon Tong

Duke Garwood chronology
Holy Week (2005)	Emerald Palace (2007)	He Was a Warlock (2009)

Professional ratings
Review scores
Source	Rating
Drowned in Sound	4/10
The Guardian	3/5 stars

Emerald Palace is the second studio album by the English multi-instrumentalist Duke Garwood. It was released by Butterfly Recordings on 27 March 2007.

== Critical reception ==
The Guardian wrote that "it's like traditional country blues subjected to a barrage of 21st-century urban noise, with something of the guitar-improv abstractions of the late, great Derek Bailey thrown in." Drowned in Sound called the album "a bit of a shambles with fleeting moments of real joy."

== Track listing ==
No.	Title	Length
1.	"I Can Wait"	2:15
2.	"Beast of Wood"	2:04
3.	"Then We Be"	2:30
4.	"Obliteratus"	1:57
5.	"The Lonely Freak"	3:14
6.	"Shimmering Visage in the Eye of the Black Rhino"	2:17
7.	"9 Peace"	2:48
8.	"Pirates"	2:02
9.	"Late Night Caller"	1:56
10.	"Solar Vacation"	1:46
11.	"Dash It All"	1:53
12.	"Bathe Me Like the Sun"	2:07
13.	"Heat Haze Horizon"	2:36
14.	"Swans on the Water"	1:24
15.	"Psychic Weather"	2:40
16.	"The Bark"	3:16
17.	"Flame Song"	0:46
18.	"Silver Lake"	1:19

== Personnel ==
- Duke Garwood - guitar, horns
- Simon Tong - bass guitar, banjo, guitar
- Paul May - drums
