= Blues Funeral =

Studio album by Mark Lanegan
- Released: February 6, 2012
- Recorded: January—May 2011
- Studios: 11AD Studio, Hollywood, California
- Genres: Alternative rock, blues rock
- Length: 55:27
- Language: English
- Label: 4AD
- Producer: Alain Johannes

Mark Lanegan chronology
Bubblegum (2004)	Blues Funeral (2012)	Black Pudding (2013)

Singles from Blues Funeral
- 1. "The Gravedigger's Song" Released: December 5, 2011; 2. "Gray Goes Black" Released: January 30, 2012 (download only); 3. "Harborview Hospital" Released: April 9, 2012 (promo only)

Blues Funeral is the seventh studio album by American alternative rock musician Mark Lanegan, released on February 6, 2012, on 4AD. The album was recorded with producer Alain Johannes throughout early 2011 and Johannes, as well as other musicians including Greg Dulli, David Catching and Jack Irons, contributed to the recording process. Blues Funeral was announced for release on November 7, 2011, through Lanegan's official website and less than a month later, the album's lead single, "The Gravedigger's Song," was released as a digital download on iTunes.

Aside from collaborative albums with Isobel Campbell, and other collaboration projects including Soulsavers and The Gutter Twins, Blues Funeral was Mark Lanegan's first new material in eight years, since Bubblegum (2004) Upon its release, Blues Funeral received widespread critical acclaim and charted in six countries within the week of its release, including Belgium, the Netherlands, Sweden, New Zealand and the United Kingdom.

== Background ==
Following extensive collaborations with Isobel Campbell, former vocalist and celloist of indie pop band Belle & Sebastian, Lanegan began working on Blues Funeral after the tour in promotion of their third collaborative studio album, Hawk (2010). The tour concluded on October 29, 2010, in Los Angeles, California and Lanegan subsequently began composing songs. In an interview with Mojo, Lanegan described his writing process for the album, saying that: "[all of the songs on the new record] were written right before or during the period when we recorded" and "generally I write on the guitar, but this one I started a few with the keyboard and a drum machine, to do something different. With Al [Johannes], I can show him something on acoustic guitar and give him a description and within a couple of hours it's done."

In his 2017 book I Am the Wolf: Lyrics & Writings, Lanegan admits he had more or less lost interest in writing and singing after a near death experience, and it was only after recording "Burning Jacob's Ladder" with producer Alain Johannes as the initial trailer tune for the video game Rage that the pair continued collaborating, with the singer commenting, "If forced to choose only one of my albums to play live, this would be it."

== Composition ==
The Quietus described the album's sound as: "Blues Funeral incorporates beats marshalled by sequencers with grand cinematic sweeps and a rock & roll sensibility that reveals an artist refusing to paint himself into a corner." Lanegan also noted that "with this new record, because I use a lot of the elements of my influences that I haven't on previous record, I've made a record that's something more like I would personally listen to than some of the records that I've made before," and listed the album's influences as The Gun Club's Miami, Joy Division's Closer and Roxy Music's Country Life among others. Lanegan reflects on the album and its compositions in I Am the Wolf:

- "'The Gravedigger's Song' was something I had originally tried to use on someone else's recording, but it didn't make any sense until a drumbeat lifted from an Adam Ant song proved to be its missing component..."
- "'Riot in My House' was inspired, like many of my tunes through the years, by the music of Swedish band The Leather Nun."
- "Danish director Nicolas Winding Refn's Pusher trilogy was the stimulus behind 'Ode to Sad Disco,' and its music was taken in part from the Pusher II soundtrack."
- "Blues Funeral's title is an homage to the great T.S. McPhee's band The Groundhogs, and its overall sound is reflective of my Krautrock listening habit..."

== Release ==
Lanegan's official website posted a press release on November 7, 2011 announcing that Blues Funeral was due to be released worldwide on February 6, 2012. The album was made available for pre-order on iTunes and domestic versions of the album on CD and double LP were made available through the 4AD Store and Amazon. Physical versions of the album were released a day later than the digital release. On January 21, 2012, Amazon previewed thirty-second clips of each songs on the album and on January 31, Mojo made the album available for stream in its entirety.

=== Tour ===
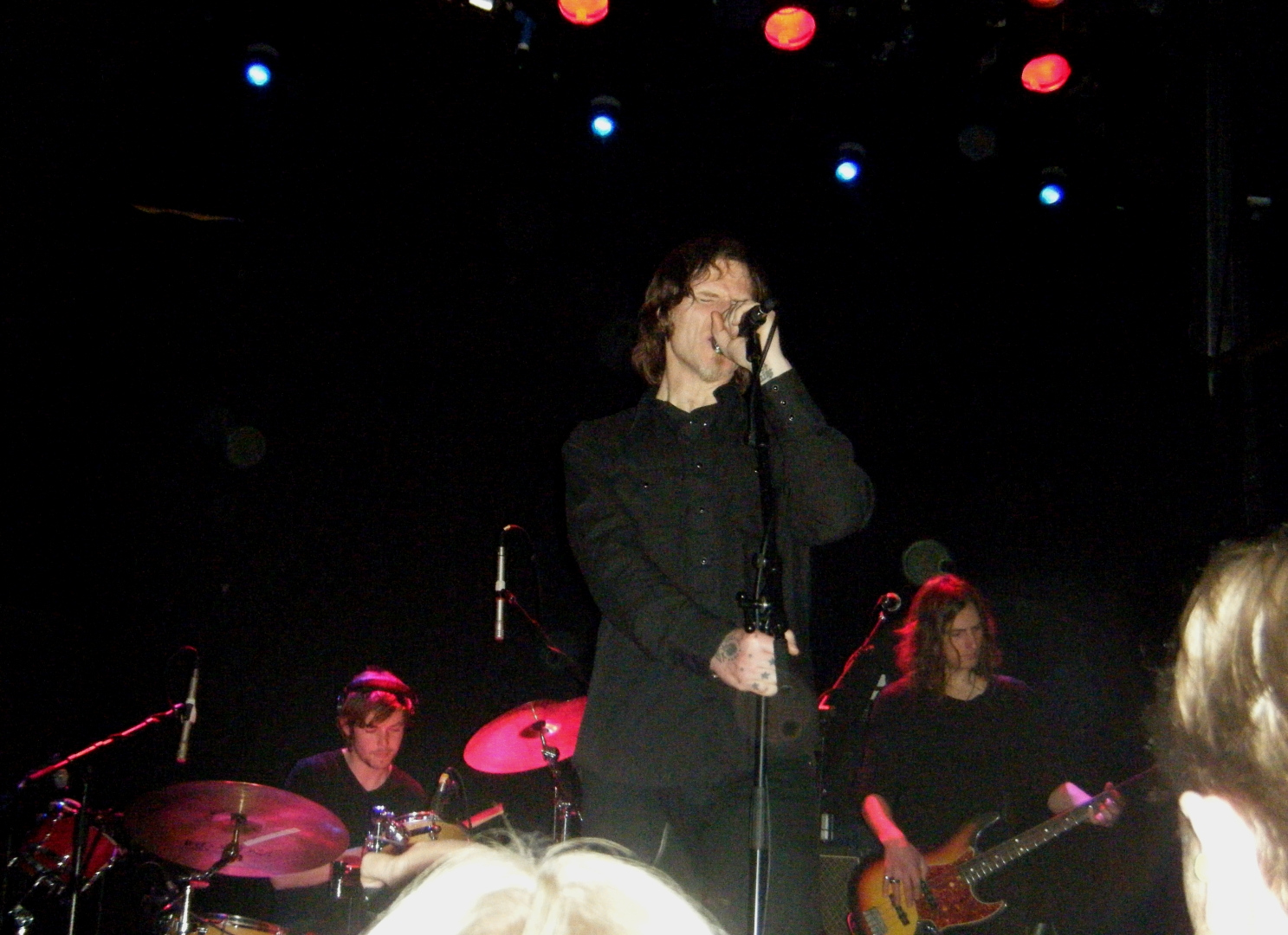
Lanegan performing live in Dublin during the Blues Funeral tour.

A two-leg tour was planned to accompany the release of Blues Funeral throughout spring 2012. Lanegan performed two shows in the United States—at the Bowery Ballroom in New York on February 7 and at Echoplex in Los Angeles, California on February 9— prior to the European tour which would last from February 24 to April 2. The tour would include Norway, Finland, the Netherlands, Belgium, United Kingdom, Ireland, Germany, Denmark, Poland, Czech Republic, Slovakia, Austria, Croatia, Italy, Switzerland, Spain, and Portugal. Following the release of the album, Lanegan announced two further legs of the tour with five shows in Australia and New Zealand in April 2012 and with twelve shows in the United States, Mexico and Canada in May 2012.

Date	City	Country	Venue
North America
February 7, 2012	New York City	United States	Bowery Ballroom
February 9, 2012	Los Angeles	United States	Echoplex
Europe
February 24, 2012	Tromsø	Norway	KulturHuset (Aurora Rock)
February 25, 2012	Oslo	Norway	Rockefeller Music Hall
February 26, 2012	Helsinki	Finland	The Circus
February 28, 2012	Groningen	Netherlands	De Oosterpoort
February 29, 2012	Amsterdam	Netherlands	Paradiso
March 1, 2012	Eindhoven	Netherlands	Effenaar
March 2, 2012	Antwerp	Belgium	Muziekcentrum TRIX
March 3, 2012	Antwerp	Belgium	Muziekcentrum TRIX
March 4, 2012	Bristol	United Kingdom	O2 Academy Bristol
March 5, 2012	Manchester	United Kingdom	Academy 2
March 7, 2012	Dublin	Ireland	The Academy
March 8, 2012	Belfast	Ireland	Mandela Hall
March 9, 2012	Glasgow	United Kingdom	O2 ABC Glasgow
March 10, 2012	Leeds	United Kingdom	The Cockpit
March 12, 2012	Birmingham	United Kingdom	HMV Institute
March 13, 2012	London	United Kingdom	O2 Shepherd's Bush Empire
March 14, 2012	Cologne	Germany	Gloria
March 15, 2012	Hamburg	Germany	Grünspan Club
March 17, 2012	Copenhagen	Denmark	Amager Bio
March 18, 2012	Berlin	Germany	C-Club
March 19, 2012	Warsaw	Poland	Proxima
March 20, 2012	Prague	Czech Republic	Lucerna Music Hall
March 22, 2012	Vienna	Austria	Arena
March 23, 2012	Zurich	Switzerland	Schiffbau (M4Music)
March 24, 2012	Bologna	Italy	Estragon
March 25, 2012	Milan	Italy	Alcatraz
March 27, 2012	Bilbao	Spain	Kafe Antzokia
March 28, 2012	Santiago	Spain	Sala Capitol
March 30, 2012	Porto	Portugal	Hard Club
March 31, 2012	Lisbon	Portugal	TMN ao Vivo
April 1, 2012	Madrid	Spain	Sala Kapital
April 2, 2012	Barcelona	Spain	Sala Bikini
Oceania
April 18, 2012	Mount Eden	New Zealand	The Powerstation
April 20, 2012	Sydney	Australia	The Hi-Fi
April 21, 2012	Brisbane	Australia	The Tivoli
April 24, 2012	Adelaide	Australia	The Gov
April 26, 2012	Melbourne	Australia	Forum Theatre
North America
May 10, 2012	New York City	United States	Webster Hall}
May 11, 2012	Washington	United States	9:30 Club
May 12, 2012	Philadelphia	United States	The TLA
May 13, 2012	Boston	United States	Paradise Rock Club
May 15, 2012	Toronto	Canada	Mod Club Theatre
May 16, 2012	Detroit	United States	Small's
May 17, 2012	Chicago	United States	Metro
May 20, 2012	Denver	United States	Bluebird Theater
May 22, 2012	Los Angeles	United States	Gene Autry Museum
May 23, 2012	San Francisco	United States	Great American Music Hall
May 25, 2012	George	United States	Gorge Amphitheatre (Sasquatch! Music Festival)
May 26, 2012	Portland	United States	Wonder Ballroom
Europe
November 3, 2012	Dornbirn	Austria	Conrad Sohm
November 4, 2012	Stuttgart	Germany	Universum
November 5, 2012	Erlangen	Germany	E-Werk
November 6, 2012	Wrocław	Poland	Firlej
November 7, 2012	Katowice	Poland	Jazz Club Hipnoza
November 9, 2012	Aarhus	Denmark	VoxHall
November 10, 2012	Lund	Sweden	Mejeriet
November 11, 2012	Stockholm	Sweden	Göta Källare
November 13, 2012	Hanover	Germany	Musikzentrum
November 15, 2012	Enschede	Netherlands	Poppodium Atak
November 16, 2012	The Hague	Netherlands	Nationaal Toneel Gebouw
November 17, 2012	Wangels	Germany	Weißenhäuser Strand
November 18, 2012	Brussels	Belgium	Cirque Royal
November 20, 2012	Bratislava	Slovakia	Klub za Zrkadlom
November 21, 2012	Belgrade	Serbia	Omladine
November 22, 2012	Budapest	Hungary	A38
November 24, 2012	Zagreb	Croatia	PAUK
November 25, 2012	Ljubljana	Slovenia	KS
November 26, 2012	Graz	Austria	PPC
November 27, 2012	Lausanne	Switzerland	Les Docks
November 29, 2012	Ciampino	Italy	Orion
November 30, 2012	Florence	Italy	Viper
December 1, 2012	Zurich	Switzerland	abart
December 2, 2012	Heidelberg	Germany	Karlstorbahnhof
December 4, 2012	London	England	HMV Forum
December 5, 2012	Paris	France	Le Trabendo
December 7, 2012	Madrid	Spain	Primavera Club
December 8, 2012	Barcelona	Spain	Primavera Club
December 10, 2012	Tel Aviv	Israel	Barby
December 11, 2012	Istanbul	Turkey	Salon IKSV

== Reception ==
Professional ratings
Aggregate scores
Source	Rating
AnyDecentMusic?	7.6/10
Metacritic	75/100
Review scores
Source	Rating
AllMusic	3.5/5 stars
The A.V. Club	C−
The Guardian	3/5 stars
The Independent	5/5 stars
Mojo	5/5 stars
Pitchfork	5.9/10
Q	4/5 stars
Rolling Stone	3/5 stars
Spin	8/10
Uncut	4/5 stars

Blues Funeral was released to positive critical acclaim. At Metacritic, which assigns a normalised rating out of 100 to reviews from mainstream critics, the album received an average score of 75, based on 32 reviews, indicating "generally favorable reviews". Mojo reviewer Keith Cameron said that "no other singer of his generation plumbs the depths so credibly, or does mournful with such grace", awarded the album a full five stars and referred to it as an "instant MOJO classic." Andy Gill of The Independent called Blues Funeral "the most accomplished of Lanegan's albums," adding that the album is "boasting a rare congruence between lyrical themes and musical evocations". BBC Music's Kevin Harley said that the album "deepens his pitch while exhibiting a range and grace beyond his death's-head profile" and "sells [the songs] with conviction and character." Tom Hughes of The Guardian described it as "bluesy, lugubrious, modernish rock, elevated by Lanegan's remarkable gravel-pit of a voice" but concluded that "running close to a full hour, this can feel like a long funeral". Drowned in Sound reviewer Robert Leedham referred to the album as "deliciously callous but cursedly familiar" and added that it was "a record for ardent fans and not casual admirers". Jason Heller of The A.V. Club referred to the album as "a blatant and lackluster attempt to keep up with the times" and criticised its production "in which no note or texture is left digitally unprocessed". Pitchfork described Blues Funeral as "a mixed bag" and the songs as "many dirges that simply drag", but positively noted the album's influences and Lanegan's vocals ("almost invariably powerful on a sheer physical level"). Stereogum listed the album as Album of the Week upon its release and gave a very positive review applauding Lanegan's vocals, the album's synthpop influences and "his most unburdened album in many, many years".

== Track listing ==
All tracks are written by Mark Lanegan.

No.	Title	Length
1.	"The Gravedigger's Song"	3:43
2.	"Bleeding Muddy Water"	6:17
3.	"Gray Goes Black"	4:11
4.	"St Louis Elegy"	4:34
5.	"Riot in My House"	3:53
6.	"Ode to Sad Disco" (Contains elements of "Sad Disco" by Keli Hlodversson)	6:24
7.	"Phantasmagoria Blues"	3:16
8.	"Quiver Syndrome"	4:03
9.	"Harborview Hospital"	4:31
10.	"Leviathan"	4:22
11.	"Deep Black Vanishing Train"	3:06
12.	"Tiny Grain of Truth"	7:07
Total length:		55:27

Japanese bonus track

No.	Title	Length
13.	"Burning Jacob's Ladder"	3:48

== Personnel ==
Musicians

- Mark Lanegan – vocals
- Alain Johannes – guitar, bass, keyboards, percussion, backing vocals
- Jack Irons – drums
- Aldo Struyf – keyboards (8, 9, 12), guitar (12)
- Dave Rosser – guitar (3, 6)
- Duke Garwood – guitar (2, 12)
- David Catching – guitar (2,5 & 11)
- Martyn LeNoble – bass (7, 9)

Guest musicians

- Chris Goss – guitar (10), backing vocals (10)
- Greg Dulli – backing vocals (4)
- Josh Homme – guitar (5)
- Shelley Brien – backing vocals (8)

Technical personnel

- Alain Johannes – producer, engineer, mixing

== Chart positions ==
Chart (2012)	Peak position
Austrian Top 40	42
Belgian Albums Chart (Vl)	4
Belgian Albums Chart (WA)	50
Canadian Albums Chart	172
Danish Albums Chart	37
Dutch Top 40	20
Finnish Albums Chart	24
French Albums Chart	51
German Albums Chart	41
Irish Albums Chart	12
Irish Independent Albums Chart	2
Italian Albums Chart	38
Norwegian Albums Chart	12
Spanish Albums Chart	53
Swedish Albums Chart	23
Swiss Albums Chart	27
New Zealand Albums Chart	40
UK Albums Chart	21
US Billboard 200	99
US Billboard Alternative Albums	16
US Billboard Independent Albums	15
US Billboard Rock Albums	26
US Billboard Tastemaker Albums	5

=== Year-end charts ===
Chart (2012)	Position
Belgian Albums Chart (Flanders)	42
