= Tenderfoot Mountain =

Mountain in Colorado, United States

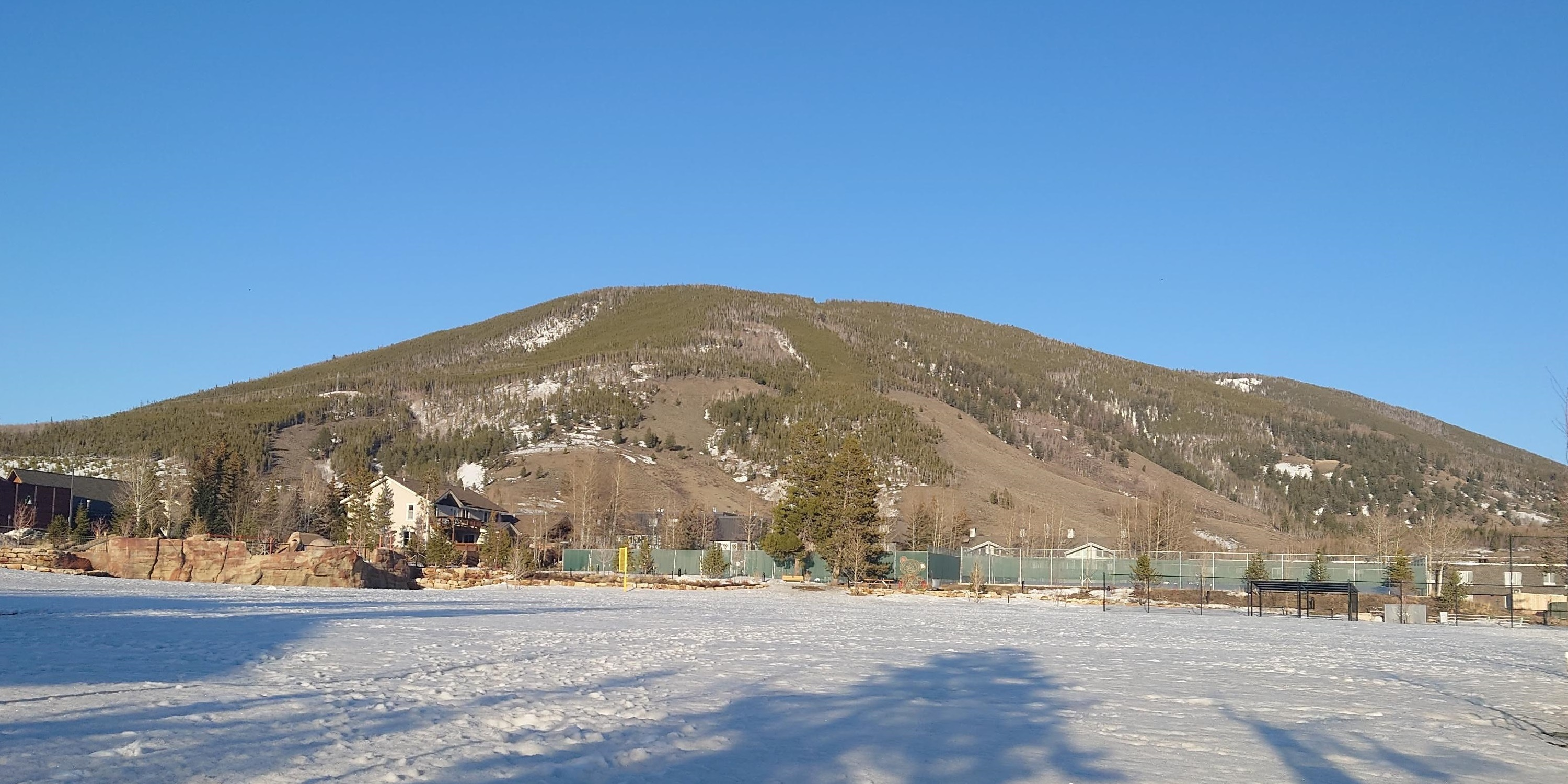
- Tenderfoot Mountain as seen from Dillon Town Park

Highest point
- Elevation: 11,443 ft (3,488 m)
- Coordinates: 39°38′09″N 106°00′13″W, 39°38′13″N 106°00′01″W

Geography
- Location within Colorado
- Location: Dillon, Summit County, Colorado, U.S.
- Topo map: USGS Dillon

Tenderfoot Mountain is a mountain east of Dillon in Summit County, Colorado. Swan Mountain lies south of Tenderfoot Mountain and Dillon Reservoir is located southwest.

== See also ==
- Tenderfoot Mtn. Trail System on U. S. Department of Agriculture, Dillon Ranger District
