= Arrows of Love =

British rock band

- Origin: London, UK
- Genres: Alternative, grunge, post-punk
- Years active: present
- Label: Independent
- Members: Nima Teranchi: Alex Brown; Craig Doporto; Nuha Ruby Ra; Phillip Stakem
- Website: http://arrowsoflove.com

Arrows of Love is an English, London-based musical group, based around the songwriting and performance styles of creative partners Nima Teranchi and Nuha Ruby Ra. The wider group resembles something akin to a collective, with members swapping in and out for various tours and shows, adding to its nature as a constantly evolving force, and threaded together by the fiercely energetic live shows and inventive songwriting which are the trademark of its main members.

In the UK, Arrows of Love received the PRSF's respected Momentum Award, which funded their then upcoming second album, produced and mastered by Mikko Gordon and Bob Weston of the American band, Shellac. They have toured Europe with California's Meatbodies, had a string of dates in the US including South by Southwest and CMJ Music Marathon, and booked 2016 dates with The Fall, and the American musician Mike Watt of both The Stooges and Minutemen.

The first album featured various musicians in its recording – drums by Wim Eden, female vocals by Lyndsey Lupe, guitars by Alex Pyper, Luis Felber, and Oliver Martin, and cello by Kate Le Versha. Other recordings have featured Stefano Bernardi on guitar. Although not featured on recordings, other notable members include Mike Frank and Rufus Miller.

Oliver Martin died in January 2026.

== Discography ==
Albums

- PRODUCT: Your Soundtrack to the Impending Societal Collapse (I'm Not From London Records)
- Everythings F***ed (2014, (1-2-3-4 Records))

Singles

- "The Knife" (2014, (Urban Fox Recordings)
- "Conspiracy Podcast" (2013, (Strong Island Recordings)
- "Honey" (2012, Handspun Records)
