= Fur (Archie Bronson Outfit album) =

Studio album by Archie Bronson Outfit
- Released: 26 July 2004
- Genre: Alternative rock
- Length: 37:36
- Label: Domino

Archie Bronson Outfit chronology
Fur (2004)	Derdang Derdang (2006)

Professional ratings
Review scores
Source	Rating
Allmusic	link
Stylus Magazine	(B−) link
Uncut	link

Fur is the debut full-length album by London-based band Archie Bronson Outfit. It was released on 26 July 2004.

== Track listing ==
1. "Butterflies" – 3:45
2. "Islands" – 3:07
3. "Here He Comes" – 2:21
4. "Riders" – 3:56
5. "Bloodheat" – 5:23
6. "On the Shore" – 3:52
7. "The Wheel Rolls On" – 4:08
8. "Armour for a Broken Heart" – 2:31
9. "Kangaroo Heart" – 3:06
10. "Pompeii" – 5:27

== Singles ==
- "Kangaroo Heart" (23 February 2004, Domino Records)
- "Islands" (5 July 2004, Domino Records, #102 UK)
- "Here He Comes" (8 November 2004, Domino Records)
