= Bruiser (album) =

Studio album by The Duke Spirit
- Released: September 2011
- Recorded: 2010–2011
- Genre: Garage rock
- Producer: Andrew Scheps

The Duke Spirit chronology
Neptune (2008)	Bruiser (2011)	Kin (2016)

Bruiser is the third studio album by English band The Duke Spirit. It was released in 2011 and was produced and mixed by Andrew Scheps. "Everybody's Under Your Spell" had previously been released as the lead track of the band's Kusama EP from 2010, and "Surrender" and "Don't Wait" were released as singles with accompanying music videos. "Surrender" is featured in the soundtrack of the 2012 video game Forza Horizon, on the in-game radio station "Horizon Rocks".

== Track listing ==
All lyrics are written by Liela Moss

No.	Title	Music	Length
1.	"Cherry Tree"	Toby Butler, Moss	3:32
2.	"Procession"	Olly Betts, Butler, Moss	3:11
3.	"Villain"	Moss	4:43
4.	"Don't Wait"	Luke Ford, Moss	4:00
5.	"Surrender"	Butler, Moss	3:17
6.	"Bodies"	Butler, Moss	4:34
7.	"De Lux"	Betts, Moss	4:34
8.	"Sweet Bitter Sweet"	Butler, Moss	4:24
9.	"Running Fire"	Ford, Moss	3:19
10.	"Everybody's Under Your Spell"	Ford, Moss	3:22
11.	"Northbound"	Ford, Moss	4:40
12.	"Homecoming"	Ford, Moss	4:34

US Deluxe Version Bonus Tracks
No.	Title	Music	Length
13.	"Procession [ Gary Numan Remix]"	Betts, Butler, Moss
14.	"Cherry Tree [ SONOIO Remix]"	Butler, Moss
15.	"Bodies [Black Onassis Remix]"	Butler, Moss
16.	"Don't Wait [Loose Meat Remix]"	Ford, Moss

== Critical reception ==
According to Metacritic, Bruiser received generally favourable reviews from critics.

Professional ratings
Aggregate scores
Source	Rating
Metacritic	(66%)
Review scores
Source	Rating
Pitchfork Media	(6.5/10)
The A.V. Club	(C)

== Personnel ==
The Duke Spirit

- Liela Moss - vocals, piano, harmonica, percussion
- Luke Ford - guitar, piano, organ
- Olly Betts - drums, percussion, piano, organ, glockenspiel, guitar
- Toby Butler - guitar, bass, organ, piano
- Marc Sallis - bass

Additional musicians

- Andrew Scheps - organ on "Villain"
- Rich File - omnichord on "Surrender"

Additional technical personnel

- Andrew Scheps - production, mixing
- Rich File - production on "Procession", "Surrender", "De Lux" and "Running Fire"
- Ian Davenport - Oxford session engineering
- Alan Moulder - mixing on "Procession"
- Catherine Marks - mixing on "Bodies"
