= Gravedigger (album) =

Studio album by Janus
- Released: 1972
- Label: Harvest

Gravedigger (Hybrid, 2025)
Review scores
Source	Rating
Rock Hard	Arschbombe

Gravedigger is a studio album by Germany-based English rock band Janus, released in 1972 on Harvest Records.

The album was recorded and mixed in 24 hours. The recording sessions were troubled by the band's inability to monitor themselves because the band's equipment was too loud for the recording studio. When the band's members heard the result, they didn't like it – the record made them sound like a psychedelic band while in fact they were very aggressive and very loud on stage.

The German Rock Hard magazine described the album's genre as a "heterogeneous mix" of hippie folk, garage rock, and psychedelics.

With time, the LP became valuable among collectors and came to be considered sort of a "hidden treasure".

In 1989, the album was released on CD. In 2012, EMI asked the band's guitarist Colin Orr to remix it.

== Versions ==
- Gravedigger (1972)
- Gravedigger (Re-issue Edition, 2013)
- Gravedigger (Hybrid, 2025)
