= The Gravedigger's Song =

Single by Mark Lanegan

from the album Blues Funeral
- B-side: "Burning Jacob's Ladder"
- Released: December 5, 2011
- Recorded: 2011 at 11AD Studio in Hollywood, California
- Genre: Alternative rock
- Length: 3:43
- Label: 4AD
- Songwriter: Mark Lanegan
- Producer: Alain Johannes

Mark Lanegan singles chronology
| "Hit the City" (2004) | "The Gravedigger's Song" (2011) |

"The Gravedigger's Song" is a song by American alternative rock musician Mark Lanegan. The song is the opening track and lead single from his seventh studio album, Blues Funeral (2012), and was released on December 5, 2011. Written solely by Lanegan and produced by Alain Johannes, the song diverged significantly from Lanegan's former musical and writing style as heard on his previous album, Bubblegum (2004).

== Origin and recording ==
The song is known to have been written by Lanegan as early as late 2010. In an interview with MOJO prior to the release of Blues Funeral, Lanegan stated that "[all of the songs on the new record] were written right before or during the period when we recorded." It was recorded during the album's sessions at 11AD Studio in Hollywood, California in 2011 with producer Alain Johannes, who also contributed musically to the album. The single's b-side, "Burning Jacob's Ladder" was recorded alongside the song during the recording sessions and was previously featured on the trailer for, and soundtrack of, the video game Rage in early 2011.

== Release and reception ==
"The Gravedigger's Song" was released as a digital download on iTunes on December 5, 2011, a month following a press release by 4AD announcing the release of Blues Funeral and the subsequent tour. Although it was unclear if the single would be released physically, on January 2, 2012, 4AD released "The Gravedigger's Song" on limited edition coloured 7" vinyl that also included "a new version" of "Burning Jacob's Ladder."

The single received little promotion upon its release and therefore did not chart. However, critical response to the single was positive. Daniel Kreps of Spin noted that "he trades in his one-man-growling-in-the-studio motif for a full-flavored sound" and also recognized the song's musical differences to Lanegan's previous work, commenting that "Lanegan might have changed his musical style, but his gloomy lyrics are as feel-good as ever." Several online magazines also gave similar reviews; Stereogum described the song as "a pounding, apocalyptic thousand-yard-stare rumble; it's just the sort of mythic koan he does so well" "Burning Jacob's Ladder" was also received positively with TwentyFourBit saying: "though the tune modestly opens with sparse banjo, Lanegan's gravelly voice, and droning organ, a rhythm section soon joins in for the slow-building, blissfully noisy climax, complete with the Screaming Trees frontman unleashing the full range of his rock vocal chops and a 5-second guitar-driven caterwaul."

== Track listing ==
Digital download and limited edition 7" vinyl

1. "The Gravedigger's Song" - 3:43
2. "Burning Jacob's Ladder" - 3:48

== Release history ==
| Region | Date | Format |
|---|---|---|
| Worldwide | December 5, 2011 | Digital download |
| United States | January 2, 2012 | 7" vinyl |
