= Thomas White (musician) =

English musician (born 1984)

- Born: 30 April 1984 (age 42); Brighton, England
- Genres: psychedelic, pop, rock
- Instruments: Vocals, guitar, drums, keyboard, violin, clarinet
- Years active: 2001–present

Thomas White (born 30 April 1984) is an English musician and producer. He currently drums for Sea Power and The Waeve as well as releasing his own music as White Magic for Lovers.

From 2001-2019 White was one half of psychedelic pop duo The Electric Soft Parade along with his brother Alex, releasing a string of critically acclaimed albums including 2002's Mercury Prize-nominated Holes in the Wall. From 2003-2009 he contributed vocals and guitar to cult Brighton super-group Brakes.

== Career ==
Educated at Davigdor Infants, Somerhill Juniors and Hove Park schools, he signed his first record deal (with DB Records) whilst still 16 and studying for his GCSEs.

White released his debut album, I Dream of Black, in June 2008. Its follow-up, The Maximalist, was released through Cooking Vinyl in March 2010. White performed, recorded, and mixed the album himself. The sleeve was designed by American artist Keith Boadwee. The album was released to generally positive reviews, with Uncut magazine awarding four stars, stating, "The Maximalist opens the dam of ostensibly conflicting styles and releases the deluge in all its crazily self-confident, so-wrong-it's-right glory. White fuses elements of The Who, Chicago, My Bloody Valentine, Queens of the Stone Age, Badalamenti and Badfinger, which is not just a feat of cut-and-paste engineering, but also proof of his verve, vivid imagination and fervent love of music."

On 26 March 2011, White's third album, Yalla! (Egyptian Arabic for "let's go") was streamed for free on YouTube. The album was written and recorded over two weeks in Dahab on the Sinai Peninsula. Featuring only acoustic guitar and vocal, the album compares the end of a long relationship to moving to a foreign country. Promotional videos for the album feature footage taken in Brighton, Dahab and Cairo. Yalla! was released physically in the UK and digitally worldwide by Bleeding Heart Recordings in March 2012.

From 2014-2018 White released a number of albums as The Fiction Aisle, all of which are (as of 2026) out of print.

White now performs and releases solo material under the moniker White Magic for Lovers. A debut album, The Book of Lies, was released on 14 February 2025 through Chord Orchard. In support of the album, a live incarnation of the project performed a number of UK and European tour dates.

White continues to work regularly as a drummer/guitarist with other bands. As of 2026 he is the drummer in Sea Power and The Waeve and touring guitarist with The Twang.

== Solo discography (2008-2025) ==
=== Thomas White ===
- I Dream of Black (Drift Records, 2008)
- The Maximalist (Cooking Vinyl, 2010)
- Yalla! (Bleeding Heart Recordings, 2012)

=== The Fiction Aisle ===
- Heart Map Rubric (Chord Orchard, 2015)
- Fuchsia Days (Chord Orchard, 2016)
- Jupiter, Florida (Chord Orchard, 2018)

=== White Magic for Lovers ===
- The Book of Lies (Chord Orchard, 2025)
- Lore EP (Chord Orchard, 2025)
