= The Tenderfoot (band) =

- Origin: Brighton, England
- Genres: Indie rock
- Years active: 2002-2005
- Label: Sony BMG 5:15
- Spinoff of: Brakes

The Tenderfoot were an English indie rock band featuring members Darren Moon (also of the Modern Ovens), Gavin Moon, Russell Prior, Joel Gibson and Marc Beatty of Brakes.

The band released two albums: Vale Industrial in 2004 and Save The Year in 2005 both on Sony BMG's 5:15 label.

The Tenderfoot's debut was well received, with plays on BBC Radio 1, London's Xfm and 6Music

Members of the band were also associated with acts such as Brakes and The Modern Ovens.

The Tenderfoot also featured on a 2006 Qmagazine compilation Mellow Gold alongside Evan Dando, I Am Kloot and Elliott Smith and on a British Sea Power B-Side for the song "A Lovely Day Tomorrow".

In 2008, the song "People are the Problem" was featured on the Independents Day ID08 compilation album.

== Discography ==
=== Studio albums ===
- Vale Industrial (2004)
- Save The Year (2005)

=== Singles ===
- "Still Holding My Stomach In" (2004)
- "Waking Me Up Again" (2004)
- "Cowbell Blues" (2005)

=== Compilation albums ===
- Acoustic Chill Volume 2
- Mellow Gold

== See also ==
- Brakes
