= Touchdown (Brakes album) =

Studio album by Brakes
- Released: April 20, 2009
- Recorded: Chem 19 Studios, Hamilton, Scotland
- Genre: Alternative rock
- Length: 36:10
- Label: Fat Cat Records
- Producer: Paul Savage

Brakes chronology
The Beatific Visions (2006)	Touchdown (2009)

Professional ratings
Aggregate scores
Source	Rating
Metacritic	74/100
Review scores
Source	Rating
Robert Christgau	(1-star Honorable Mention)
NME	8/10
Pitchfork Media	7.7/10
PopMatters	8/10 stars
Spin	4/5 stars

Touchdown is the third album from the Brighton-based band Brakes, released in 2009 on Fat Cat Records.

== Track listing ==
1. "Two Shocks" - 3:49
2. "Don’t Take Me To Space (Man)" - 2:41
3. "Red Rag" - 1:33
4. "Worry About It Later" - 2:03
5. "Crush On You" - 3:14
6. "Eternal Return" - 2:32
7. "Do You Feel The Same?" - 1:33
8. "Ancient Mysteries" - 1:57 [Charles Douglas cover]
9. "Oh! Forever" - 4:08
10. "Hey Hey" - 2:18
11. "Why Tell The Truth (When It’s Easier To Lie)" - 3:32
12. "Leaving England" - 3:50
13. "First Dance" (hidden track) - 2:35
