= The Beatific Visions =

Studio album by Brakes
- Released: 6 November 2006 (UK); 8 May 2007 (US)
- Recorded: House of David, Nashville, Tennessee in June 2006
- Genre: Alternative rock
- Length: 28:00
- Label: Rough Trade
- Producer: Stuart Sikes and Brakes

Brakes chronology
Give Blood (2005)	The Beatific Visions (2006)	Touchdown (2009)

Professional ratings
Review scores
Source	Rating
AllMusic	4/5 stars
Drowned in Sound	9/10 stars
Pitchfork	(7.8/10)
Playlouder	4.5/5 stars
Stylus Magazine	C+
This Is Fake DIY	3.5/5 stars

The Beatific Visions is the second album by Brakes. It was released in November 2006. The Rough Trade Shop named it the fifth best album of the year.

== Track listing ==
1. "Hold Me in the River" – 2:00
2. "Margarita" – 2:06
3. "If I Should Die Tonight" – 2:01
4. "Mobile Communication" – 3:47
5. "Spring Chicken" – 2:00
6. "Isabel" – 2:26
7. "Beatific Visions" – 2:53
8. "Porcupine or Pineapple" – 1:04
9. "Cease and Desist" – 2:27
10. "On Your Side" – 2:20
11. "No Return" – 4:57
