= Derdang Derdang =

Studio album by Archie Bronson Outfit
- Released: 3 April 2006
- Genres: Alternative rock, garage rock
- Length: 38:43
- Label: Domino
- Producer: Jacquire King

Archie Bronson Outfit chronology
Fur (2004)	Derdang Derdang (2006)	Coconut (2010)

Professional ratings
Review scores
Source	Rating
Allmusic	4/5 stars
musicOMH.com	4/5 stars
Pitchfork Media	7.9/10
Playlouder	4/5
PopMatters	6/10
The Dwarf	(unfavourable)

Derdang Derdang is the second full-length album by London-based band Archie Bronson Outfit. It was released on 3 April 2006.

== Track listing ==
1. "Cherry Lips" – 4:17
2. "Kink" – 2:43
3. "Dart for My Sweetheart" – 4:30
4. "Got to Get (Your Eyes)" – 3:14
5. "Dead Funny" – 4:12
6. "Modern Lovers" – 3:20
7. "Cuckoo" – 4:10
8. "Jab Jab" – 2:53
9. "How I Sang Dang" – 3:46
10. "Rituals" – 3:22
11. "Harp for My Sweetheart" – 2:16

== Singles ==
- "Dart for My Sweetheart" (27 February 2006, Domino Records)
- "Dead Funny" (3 July 2006, Domino Records, #105 UK)
- "Cherry Lips" (9 October 2006, Domino Records, #104 UK)
- "Dart for My Sweetheart" (7" vinyl only re-issue, 26 March 2007, Domino Records)
