= Archie Bronson Outfit =

English rock band

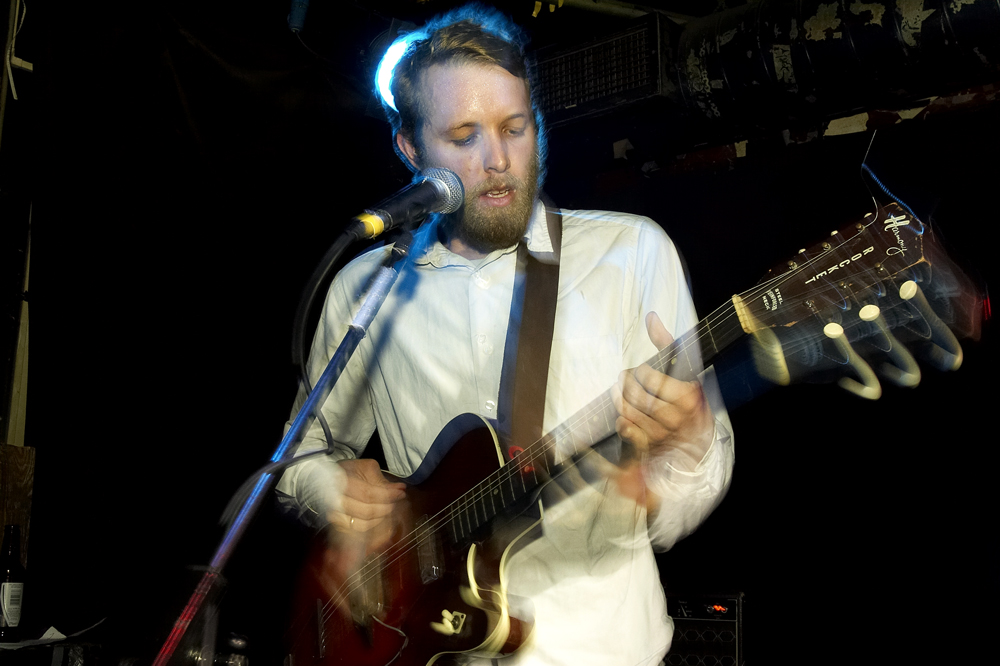
- Archie Bronson Outfit at The Barfly Club, Camden, London, UK. September 2005.

Background information
- Origin: London, England
- Genres: Alternative rock, blues rock, southern rock
- Label: Domino
- Website: www.archiebronsonoutfit.com

Archie Bronson Outfit are an English rock band. They met at Kingswood School, Bath.

After leaving their native Somerset, the band moved to London where they were discovered by Laurence Bell, boss of Domino Records. The band were playing in Bell's local bar, "The Cat's Back" in Putney. The band released their debut album Fur in 2004. Fur was produced by Jamie "Hotel" Hince of The Kills.

The band released their second album, Derdang Derdang on 3 April 2006. The album was recorded in Nashville in the summer of 2005 and produced by Jacquire King. The album received generally excellent reviews, with Uncut, musicOMH and Mojo awarding it four stars out of five. The London listing magazine Time Out awarded it five stars out of five. Both albums Fur and Derdang Derdang feature occasional collaborator and a secret fourth member at the time Duke Garwood on clarinet and rhaita (a Moroccan reed instrument). Archie Bronson Outfit performed a showcase at the 2006 South by Southwest festival in Austin, Texas. The band used to perform on stage accompanied by an illuminated plastic goose. In December 2006, Mojo voted Derdang Derdang fifth best album of 2006 in their end of year poll beating such notables as Cat Power and Sonic Youth.

In January 2007, they won the South Bank/Times Breakthrough Award and played a live gig at the T-Mobile Transmission television event in April 2007.

Archie Bronson Outfit released their third album, Coconut, on 1 March 2010. It was their first LP in almost four years for Domino Records. They toured the UK in March 2010 to support the album release.

ABO's fourth LP, Wild Crush, hit the shops on 19 May 2014, again on Domino Records. By now, the band was down to Sam and Arp with additional musicians playing on the record.

== Line up ==
- Sam Windett – vocals, guitar
- Dorian Hobday – bass, guitar
- Mark "Arp" Cleveland – drums

== Discography ==
=== Albums ===
- Fur (26 July 2004, Domino Records)
- Derdang Derdang (3 April 2006, Domino Records)
- Coconut (1 March 2010, Domino Records)
- Wild Crush (19 May 2014, Domino Records)
