= Black Pudding (album) =

Studio album by Mark Lanegan & Duke Garwood
- Released: May 13, 2013
- Studio: Pink Duck Studios, Burbank, California
- Genre: Blues, alternative rock
- Length: 44:24
- Label: Ipecac, Heavenly Recordings
- Producer: Justin Smith

Mark Lanegan chronology
Blues Funeral (2012)	Black Pudding (2013)	Imitations (2013)

Professional ratings
Aggregate scores
Source	Rating
Metacritic	71/100
Review scores
Source	Rating
AllMusic	3.5/5 stars
The Guardian	4/5 stars
Pitchfork Media	6.7/10
PopMatters	7/10
Sputnikmusic	3.5/5 stars

Black Pudding is a collaborative album by Mark Lanegan and the multi-instrumentalist Duke Garwood. It was recorded by Justin Smith at Pink Duck Studios and mixed by Alain Johannes at 11AD studios. The album was released in the United Kingdom by Heavenly Recordings on May 13, 2013, and in the United States by Ipecac the following day. The only single from the album, "Cold Molly", was released on April 20, 2013, as a Record Store Day exclusive.

== Background ==
Garwood, a multi-instrumentalist who has worked with the Orb, Wire, Wooden Wand, Sir Richard Bishop, and Kurt Vile, among others, worked with Lanegan previously when he toured as part of The Gutter Twins, the singer's project with Greg Dulli. In his 2017 book I Am the Wolf: Music and Writings, Lanegan writes that collaborator Isobel Campbell gave him a copy of Garwood's album Emerald Palace during the sessions for Sunday at Devil Dirt, and he was impressed with the "beautiful, dark, and off-kilter music." After meeting, Lanegan realised they were "kindred spirits," recalling in I Am the Wolf, "Over the course of the next several years, we sent song ideas back and forth, and in late 2012 we convened at Josh Homme's Pink Duck studio in Burbank, California, with producer Justin Smith to record Black Pudding. The finished album contains some of my favorite songs: 'Mescalito' is a song I always enjoy playing live, and 'Last Rung,' 'Driver,' and 'War Memorial' are, to me, as perfect as anything I could ever hope to be a part of."

== Reception ==
Thom Jurek of AllMusic: "Co-writing and recording a bleak yet emotionally honest collection of songs rooted in classic forms but not bound by them, is. As such, it succeeds in spades."

== Track listing ==
All tracks are written by Duke Garwood and Mark Lanegan except where noted.

No.	Title	Lyrics	Length
1.	"Black Pudding"	Garwood	2:54
2.	"Pentacostal [sic?]"		3:59
3.	"War Memorial"		2:13
4.	"Mescalito"		6:18
5.	"Sphinx"		3:28
6.	"Last Rung"		1:56
7.	"Driver"		3:30
8.	"Death Rides a White Horse"		3:59
9.	"Thank You"		2:49
10.	"Cold Molly"		4:29
11.	"Shade of the Sun"	Lanegan	3:59
12.	"Manchester Special"	Garwood	4:50

== Personnel ==
- Mark Lanegan – Vocals
- Duke Garwood – All Instruments
- Alain Johannes – Guitar (9, 11), Keyboards (9, 11)
