= Your Kisses Are Wasted on Me =

2006 single by The Pipettes

Single by The Pipettes

from the album We Are the Pipettes
- Released: 27 March 2006
- Studio: Fortress Studios
- Genre: Indie pop
- Label: Memphis Industries
- Songwriters: Robert Barry, Joe Beaumont, Rose Elinor Dougall, Jon Falcone, Seb Falcone, Gwenno Saunders, Rebecca Stephens
- Producers: Gareth Parton and Andy Dragazis

The Pipettes singles chronology
"Dirty Mind" (2005)	"Your Kisses Are Wasted on Me" (2006)	"Pull Shapes" (2006)

"Your Kisses Are Wasted on Me" was the second single from The Pipettes' debut album We Are the Pipettes. It was released on 27 March 2006 and available on CD, double 7" vinyl and digital download on Memphis Industries. The single was produced by Gareth Parton and Andy Dragazis and was accompanied by another music video and garnered substantial airplay.

== Track listing ==
=== CD single ===
1. "Your Kisses Are Wasted on Me"
2. "Dirty Mind (acoustic version)"

=== 7" white vinyl single ===
1. "Your Kisses Are Wasted on Me"
2. "Your Guitars Are Wasted on Me"

=== 7" green vinyl ===
1. "Your Kisses Are Wasted on Me"
2. "Judy (acoustic version)"

== Chart positions ==
Chart (2006)	Peak position
UK Singles (OCC)	35

== EP ==
Your Kisses Are Wasted on Me

EP by The Pipettes
- Released: 5 June 2007 (U.S.)
- Genre: Indie pop
- Label: Cherrytree Records

The Pipettes chronology
We Are the Pipettes (2006)	Your Kisses Are Wasted on Me (2007)	Earth vs. The Pipettes (2010)

Your Kisses Are Wasted on Me is an extended play which was released in June 2007 in the United States distributed under the Cherrytree Records, an imprint of Interscope Records.

=== Track listing ===
==== Enhanced CD ====
1. "Your Kisses Are Wasted on Me"
2. "I Love You"
3. "Really That Bad"
4. "Guess Who Ran Off with the Milkman?"

Video: "Your Kisses Are Wasted on Me"
