= Judy (The Pipettes song) =

Single by The Pipettes
- B-side: "It Hurts to See You Dance so Well", "KFC"
- Released: August 2005
- Genre: Pop
- Label: Total Gaylord Records
- Songwriter(s): Robert Barry, Joe Beaumont, Rose Elinor Dougall, Jon Falcone, Seb Falcone, Gwenno Saunders, Rebecca Stephens

The Pipettes singles chronology
| "ABC" (2005) | "Judy" (2005) | "Dirty Mind" (2005) |

"Judy" is a limited edition 7" single by The Pipettes of which 1,000 copies were pressed by Boston's Total Gaylord Records in August 2005. It was exclusively available via mailorder from the United States and featured a sleeve which folded out into a polka dot dress in homage to the singers' dress code. The B-side "KFC" features DJ Scotch Egg and members of The Go! Team. The first two tracks are the same recordings as the previous UK 7" releases.

Rose sings the lead vocals on the song. The video is a cartoon-like with Judy driving around in a car and in the video Rose sings "stuff" instead of arse.

== Track listing ==
1. "Judy"
2. "It Hurts to See You Dance so Well"
3. "KFC" (featuring DJ Scotch Egg)

== Re-recording ==
"Judy"

Single by The Pipettes

from the album We Are the Pipettes
- Released: 25 September 2006
- Genre: Pop
- Label: Memphis
- Songwriter(s): Robert Barry; Joe Beaumont; Rose Elinor Dougall; Jon Falcone; Seb Falcone; Gwenno Saunders; Rebecca Stephens

The Pipettes singles chronology
| "Pull Shapes" (2006) | "Judy" (2006) | "Our Love Was Saved by Spacemen" (2010) |

The song was later re-recorded and released as the fifth single from their debut album We Are the Pipettes. It was released on September 25, 2006. It is available on CD, double 7" vinyl, and digital download from Memphis Industries.

== Track listing ==
=== CD single ===
1. "Judy" (Single Mix)
2. "Simon Says"

=== 7" white vinyl single ===
1. "Judy" (Single Mix)
2. "Feminist Complaints"

=== 7" blue vinyl single ===
1. "Judy" (Single Mix)
2. "The Burning Ambition of The Early Diuretics"

=== Digital download ===
1. "Judy" (Acoustic Version)

== Chart positions ==
| Chart (2006) | Peak position |
|---|---|
| UK Singles (OCC) | 46 |
| UK Indie (OCC) | 1 |
