= Dirty Mind (The Pipettes song) =

2005 single by The Pipettes

Single by The Pipettes

from the album We Are the Pipettes
- Released: 14 November 2005
- Genre: Pop
- Label: Memphis Industries
- Songwriter(s): Robert Barry, Joe Beaumont, Rose Elinor Dougall, Jon Falcone, Seb Falcone, Gwenno Saunders, Rebecca Stephens

The Pipettes singles chronology
"Judy" (2005)	"Dirty Mind" (2005)	"Your Kisses Are Wasted on Me" (2006)

"Dirty Mind" is a single by The Pipettes. The first widely available release by the band, "Dirty Mind" was supported by a headline UK mini tour. It is available on CD, 7" vinyl and digital download it was released on 14 November 2005. It prompted the band to make their first music video and garnered airplay on many alternative radio shows including a playlist spot on 6Music. The CD b-sides were all session tracks recorded live for XFM's John Kennedy earlier the same year.

== Track listing ==
=== CD single ===
1. "Dirty Mind"
2. "Tell Me What You Want" (XFM Session)
3. "We Are The Pipettes" (XFM Session)

=== 7" single ===
1. "Dirty Mind"
2. "Because It's Not Love (But It's Still a Feeling)"

== Chart positions ==
Chart (2005)	Peak position
UK Singles (OCC)	63
