= The Waeve (album) =

Studio album by the Waeve
- Released: 3 February 2023
- Length: 53:39
- Label: Transgressive
- Producer: Graham Coxon; Rose Elinor Dougall; James Ford

The Waeve chronology
| The Waeve (2023) | City Lights (2024) |

Singles from The Waeve
- 1. "Can I Call You" Released: 6 September 2022; 2. "Drowning" Released: 24 October 2022; 3. "Kill Me Again" Released: 29 November 2022; 4. "Over and Over" Released: 19 January 2023

The Waeve (stylised as The WAEVE) is the debut studio album by the band of the same name, a duo consisting of English singer-songwriters Graham Coxon and Rose Elinor Dougall. The album was released 3 February 2023 by Transgressive Records.

== Background and release ==
Coxon and Dougall first met in 2005 at a concert by Dougall's band the Pipettes, and saw each other around occasionally over the years, but didn't consider collaborating until they met again in December 2020 at a fundraiser for the Lebanese Red Cross at the Jazz Café in Camden Town, London where Coxon performed. The night of the fundraiser, they discussed working together and exchanged phone numbers. Over the following Christmas season, the two texted back and forth, sharing links to songs they both liked and exploring each other's music tastes. They decided to meet on 2 January, sharing a walk around Hampstead Heath and talking more music. Discovering a lot of common interests, they decided to start songwriting together, working in two or three sessions a week. The two subsequently started dating and had a baby girl together. The duo's name was inspired by an old English spelling of the word "sea" as "S‑A‑E", pointing to their English folk music inspiration, water-centric lyrics, and "a kind of reconciliation of feeling at odds with what [was] happening in" the United Kingdom at the time.

The duo and album were first announced 20 April 2022 along with a 39-second song titled "Here Comes the Waeve". They also announced a standalone single, "Something Pretty", on that day; the single was released on 5 May. Four more singles were released prior to the album: "Can I Call You" on 6 September, "Drowning" on 24 October, "Kill Me Again" on 29 November, and "Over and Over" on 19 January 2023. Music videos were released for "Can I Call You" and "Kill Me Again", both directed by David J. East.

A deluxe version of the album was released on 27 March which includes four new songs.

== Writing and production ==
When the two got together to write, Coxon took the opportunity to write music that "people wouldn't necessarily expect from him, something with 'rich chord progressions.'" Neither expected their sessions to lead to enough songs for a full album, as they went into the process without any planning, just being happy to work "at their own pace, with no label, management or producer looking over their shoulder." Songs would start with chord sequences, evolving as the two found different melodies and harmonies within those sequences. As they would add new sections and string arrangements, they would eventually realise the song had extended to ten minutes long and need to rein it back in. Coxon compared the runaway process to a rabbit warren, saying some songs "went on forever and are still probably going somewhere, but the ones that we could keep control on ended up on the record."

Writing sessions involved the two playing whatever instruments they had around, focusing on physical instruments to avoid getting lost in the possibilities of their digital audio workstation's "vast library of synths". While Dougall said "it just wouldn't be right" if the album didn't contain Coxon's guitar playing, it was his work on the saxophone, an instrument he is classically trained in, which "really helped to shape the multi-angled outline" of the album. Coxon engineered most of the album before the duo brought on James Ford to finish the record. Ford made significant changes such as replacing the duo's synthesiser recordings with real string instruments and adding other sounds including a flute. Other instruments on the record include a cittern and a six string bass once owned by Sly and the Family Stone's Larry Graham. Dougall took vocal inspiration from singers such as Anne Briggs, Sandy Denny and Karen Dalton.

== Live ==
On 20 April 2022, the duo announced their first show as the Waeve at the Lexington in Islington, London on 4 May. They later added a second show at the Lexington on 6 May.

On 21 April, The Great Escape Festival announced their lineup which included the Waeve playing on 12 May along with fellow Transgressive Records acts including Mykki Blanco and Let's Eat Grandma. The duo were joined by the Electric Soft Parade drummer Thomas White, bassist Joe Chilton, and multi-instrumentalist Charlotte Glasson who played violin, keyboard, and a saxophone duet with Coxon during the song "Big Idea". Their set was the best-attended of the night and was reviewed positively by The Arts Desk's Thomas H. Green.

On 24 October, the band announced their first tour of the UK for March 2023, including shows at Manchester's Band on the Wall and Leeds' Brudenell Social Club. The band also played Primavera Sound in May and June and Vieilles Charrues Festival in July.

== Influences ==
When asked for a list of albums that inspired The Waeve in an interview with BrooklynVegan, Coxon named Talk Talk's Laughing Stock, King Crimson's In the Court of the Crimson King, Gong's Camembert Electrique, Irma Thomas's The Soul Queen of New Orleans, Van der Graaf Generator's Still Life, and Martin Carthy's Right of Passage; and Dougall named Broadcast's Tender Buttons, Fairport Convention's Unhalfbricking, Young Marble Giants's Colossal Youth, and Penguin Cafe Orchestra's Signs of Life. In another interview, Coxon specifically discussed the influence of progressive rock on the album, saying that, "if it wasn't for King Crimson or Van Der Graaf Generator there may not have been saxophone on the album or certain attitudes towards organ sounds," while also naming Gong, Robert Wyatt, Matching Mole, Caravan, and Kevin Ayers.

The duo have said one of the main themes on the album is Englishness, a concept Dougall found herself uncomfortable with in the period leading up to the 2016 Brexit referendum and ever since. Dougall noted that both her and Coxon are "identifiably English-sounding" and that singing in their natural accents is important to her, but that this inescapable cultural identity is "not easy ... to wear with pride." Coxon said that, "whatever political persuasion you are, you love this country," and Dougall emphasised the "beautiful" aspects of the culture and climate as things "you can hold on to when everything else feels like it's been co-opted by evil." Dougall regards this tension and conflict as both "objectively interesting to explore" and "important to think about ... and dwell on".

== Reception ==
The Waeve ratings
Aggregate scores
| Source | Rating |
|---|---|
| AnyDecentMusic? | 7.1/10 |
| Metacritic | 80/100 |
Review scores
| Source | Rating |
| AllMusic | 3.5/5 stars |
| The Arts Desk | 3/5 stars |
| Clash | 8/10 |
| The Daily Telegraph | 4/5 stars |
| DIY | 4/5 stars |
| Dork | 3/5 stars |
| Gigwise | 8/10 stars |
| Mojo | 4/5 stars |
| MusicOMH | 3.5/5 stars |
| Uncut | 8/10 |

According to the review aggregator Metacritic, The Waeve received "generally favorable reviews" based on a weighted average score of 80 out of 100 from 8 critic scores.

== Track listing ==
All tracks are written by Graham Coxon and Rose Elinor Dougall.

The Waeve track listing
| No. | Title | Length |
|---|---|---|
| 1. | "Can I Call You" | 4:23 |
| 2. | "Kill Me Again" | 4:09 |
| 3. | "Over and Over" | 6:13 |
| 4. | "Sleepwalking" | 5:57 |
| 5. | "Drowning" | 6:04 |
| 6. | "Someone Up There" | 2:41 |
| 7. | "All Along" | 5:33 |
| 8. | "Undine" | 7:47 |
| 9. | "Alone and Free" | 4:48 |
| 10. | "You're All I Want to Know" | 6:04 |
| Total length: | | 53:39 |

The Waeve (Deluxe)
| No. | Title | Length |
|---|---|---|
| 11. | "Standing Still" | 5:19 |
| 12. | "Sure Feels Like Something" | 4:19 |
| 13. | "On Your Knees, Baby" | 2:13 |
| 14. | "Old Fashioned Morning" | 3:35 |
| Total length: | | 69:05 |

== Personnel ==
- Graham Coxon – lead vocals, saxophone, guitar, producer, recording engineer
- Rose Elinor Dougall – lead vocals, producer
- James Ford – producer, mixing engineer, additional production, additional instruments
- Elysian Quartet – strings

== Charts ==
Chart performance for The Waeve
| Chart (2023) | Peak position |
|---|---|
| Scottish Albums (OCC) | 5 |
| UK Albums (OCC) | 30 |
