= Pull Shapes =

2006 single by The Pipettes

Single by The Pipettes

from the album We Are The Pipettes
- Released: 3 July 2006
- Genre: Pop
- Label: Memphis
- Songwriter(s): Robert Barry; Joe Beaumont; Rose Elinor Dougall; Jon Falcone; Seb Falcone; Gwenno Saunders; Rebecca Stephens

The Pipettes singles chronology
"Your Kisses Are Wasted on Me" (2006)	"Pull Shapes" (2006)	"Judy" (2006)

"Pull Shapes" is a single from The Pipettes and was released on 3 July 2006. It was available on CD, double 7" vinyl, and digital download from Memphis Industries. The expression "pull shapes" is a British English colloquialism that refers to the act of dancing.

The video for "Pull Shapes" is a shot-for-shot reenactment of a scene from Beyond the Valley of the Dolls in which the band The Kelly Affair sings "Sweet Talking Candyman."

The song was featured in The L Word, Season 5 Episode 6 ("Lights! Camera! Action!") when Jenny and Adele go shopping. It also features on the soundtrack of the 2008 film Angus, Thongs and Perfect Snogging.

In 2017, Billboard named the song #18 on their list of 100 Greatest Girl Group Songs of All Time.

== Track listing ==
=== CD single ===
1. "Pull Shapes"
2. "Really That Bad"

=== 7" white vinyl single ===
1. "Pull Shapes"
2. "Guess Who Ran Away with the Milkman?"

=== 7" yellow vinyl single ===
1. "Pull Shapes"
2. "Magician Man"

== Charts ==
Chart (2006)	Peak position
UK Singles (OCC)	26
