= The Waeve =

English band

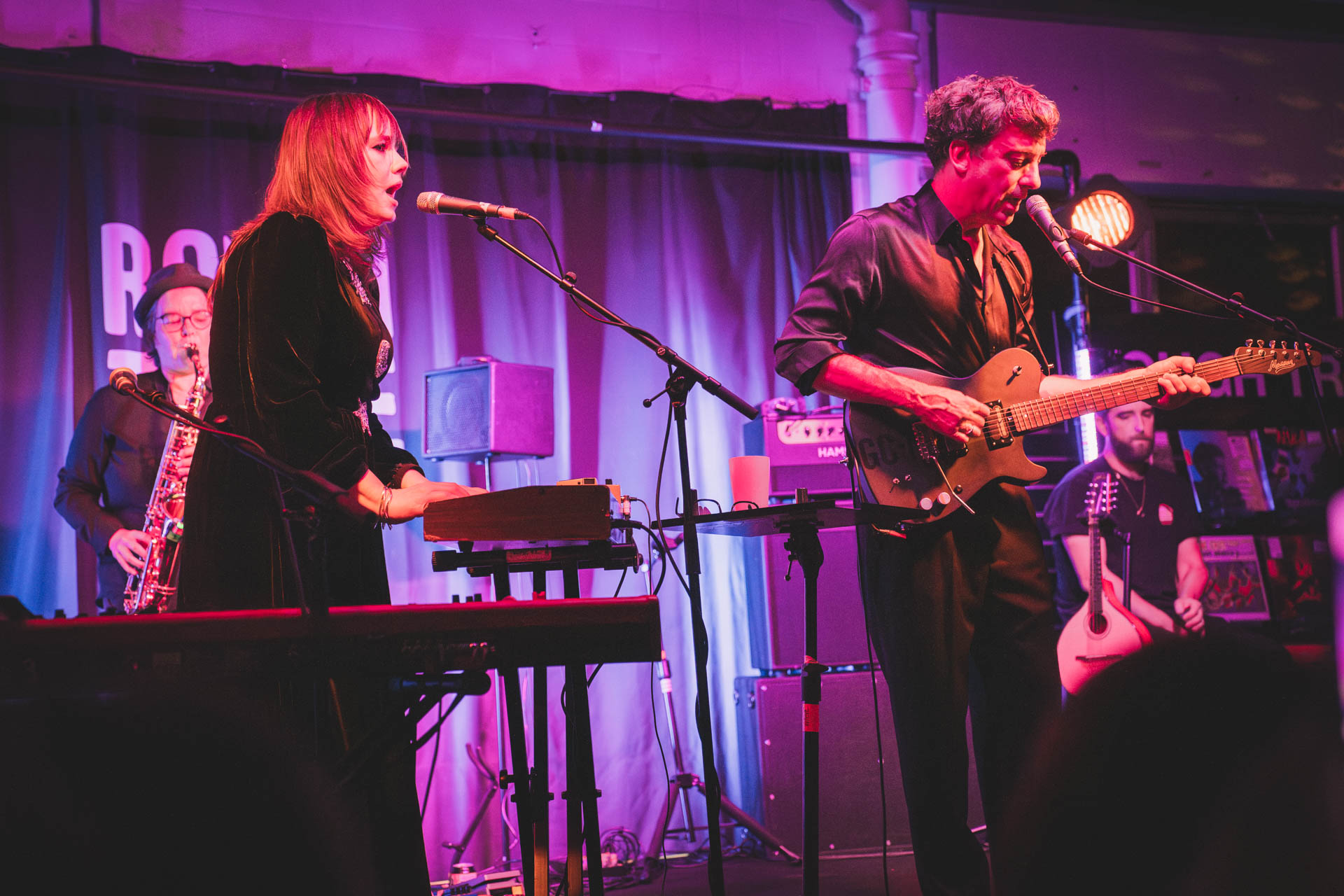
- The Waeve performing in 2024

Background information
- Origin: London, England
- Genres: Folk rock; art pop; Krautrock; progressive rock; jazz
- Years active: 2021–present
- Label: Transgressive
- Members: Graham Coxon; Rose Elinor Dougall
- Website: thewaeveofficial.com

The Waeve (stylised as The WAEVE) are an English band formed in London, in 2021 by singer-songwriters and musicians Graham Coxon and Rose Elinor Dougall. They describe their music as "a liquid meeting of musical minds and talents. A powerful elixir of cinematic British folk-rock, post-punk, organic songwriting and freefall jamming." They released their debut album, The Waeve, in 2023.

== History ==
=== Background and formation (2020–2021) ===
Graham Coxon and Rose Elinor Dougall first met in 2004 during a gig at Islington's the Buffalo Bar, in which Coxon was an attendee and Dougall was performing with the Pipettes. However, a brief chat and Dougall convincing Coxon to buy her a quadruple brandy and coke was the extent of that encounter.

They became properly acquainted in December 2020, when both were on the bill of the Live for Beirut 2.0 benefit show at the Jazz Cafe in London to raise money for victims of the Beirut warehouse explosion earlier that year.

Following the gig, Dougall suggested to Coxon that they should write a song together. After exchanging emails over Christmas, at the start of 2021 they met up for some writing sessions and quickly came up with song ideas in a few weeks. Feeling that the music they were making had a shared identity, they decided to record an album and brought in James Ford to help flesh out the production. The two musicians later formed a relationship and had a daughter together.

As both Dougall and Coxon are Pisceans and their complicated feelings towards Britain inspired their music with numerous references in the lyrics to water and sea, they decided to call themselves The Waeve using the old English spelling.

=== Going public and releasing The Waeve (2022–present) ===
On 20 April 2022, The Waeve officially went public by announcing that they would be playing their first live show and releasing their debut single, "Something Pretty", the following month.

On 6 September 2022, The Waeve shared details of their self-titled debut album while also releasing the first single from it, "Can I Call You". The second single "Drowning" followed on 24 October, along with an announcement of a U.K. tour scheduled for March 2023. The Waeve then released third single "Kill Me Again" on 24 November 2022, and on 19 January 2023 they put out "Over and Over", the fourth and final single leading up to the release of the album.

On 3 February 2023, The Waeve was released to positive reviews, including from the likes of Clash, Uncut and The Quietus.

On 2 May 2024, the Waeve released the single "City Lights", produced by James Ford, via Transgressive. BrooklynVegan's Bill Pearis called the song "a danceable widescreen ripper, with a nagging, distinctly Blur-y guitar riff, and it gives Coxon a chance to show off his saxophone skills too", and NME's Liberty Dunworth said the duo "hone in [sic] on their already-signature sound, and capture a bold, sultry chorus."

On 14 May 2024, the band was the first act to perform at the new Co-op Live arena in Manchester, as the support act for Elbow.

On 14 February 2025, the band announced their debut EP entitled 'Eternal' with the release of the single 'Love Is All Pain'.

== Musical styles and influences ==
The Waeve have cited Sandy Denny, John and Beverley Martyn, Kevin Ayers and Van der Graaf Generator as reference points for their debut album.

== Band members ==
- Graham Coxon – lead vocals, guitar, saxophone (2021–present)
- Rose Elinor Dougall – lead vocals, keyboards (2021–present)

Touring members

- Joe Chilton – bass (2022–present)
- Thomas White – drums, backing vocals (2022–present)
- Emma Smith – violin, saxophone, backing vocals (2022–2023)
- Charlotte Glasson – saxophone, violin, backing vocals (2023–present)
- Marco Briatore - drums, backing vocals (2025)

== Discography ==
=== Studio albums ===
- The Waeve (2023)
- City Lights (2024)

=== Live albums ===
- City Lights Sessions (Live) (2025)

=== Extended plays ===
- Eternal EP (2025)

=== Singles ===
- "Here Comes the Waeve" (20 April 2022)
- "Something Pretty" (5 May 2022)
- "Can I Call You" (6 September 2022)
- "Drowning" (24 October 2022)
- "Kill Me Again" (29 November 2022)
- "Over and Over" (19 January 2023)
- "City Lights" (2 May 2024)
- "You Saw" (25 June 2024)
- "Broken Boys" (28 August 2024)
- "Love Is All Pain" (14 February 2025)
