= Le Kov =

Studio album by Gwenno
- Released: 2 March 2018
- Genre: Electropop, psychedelic pop
- Language: Cornish
- Label: Heavenly Recordings
- Producer: Rhys Edwards

Gwenno chronology
Y Dydd Olaf (2015)	Le Kov (2018)	Tresor (2022)

Singles from Le Kov
- 1. "Tir Ha Mor" Released: 15 January 2018; 2. "Eus Keus?" Released: 2 Mar 2018

Le Kov ("a place of memory" in Cornish) is the second studio album by Welsh-Cornish singer-songwriter Gwenno. It was released on 2 March 2018 on Heavenly Recordings. The first single from the album is "Tir Ha Mor (Land and Sea)". Heavenly Recordings claim Gwenno felt a duty to make her second album entirely in Cornish as a record of the living language.

The songs on Le Kov are written and composed by Gwenno Saunders with help from Rhys Edwards, and features guest vocalist Gruff Rhys on the song "Daromres Y'n Howl". The album also features drum engineering by Gorwel Owen, who has produced albums by both Rhys and his band Super Furry Animals .

== Background ==
Gwenno Saunders grew up in a Cornish speaking family, with her father Tim Saunders writing Cornish poetry. Regarding her upbringing, she noted: "It was like living in a sort of cult of four people, in Riverside in Cardiff. I had no idea about popular culture. Years later, I said to my mum, 'Why didn’t you tell me about David Bowie or people like that?’ And she said that it was all just around, that I was always going to find out about that stuff myself. But it was really annoying for a while, because I’d meet people and have no idea what they were talking about – you know, ‘Who are Pavement?’”

Gwenno was also, in part, inspired to record Le Kov due to a decision by the British government to cut funding towards the Cornish language in 2016: "There’s that argument that I think is really stupid: why do you have to learn Cornish or Welsh, why don’t you learn Mandarin? It’s like everything you do has to have monetary value. I think you have to find the non-monetary value in things.” The album was later credited by the Cornish Language Board with encouraging a record number of students to take exams in the Cornish language during 2018.

== Critical reception ==
Professional ratings
Aggregate scores
Source	Rating
Metacritic	81/100
Review scores
Source	Rating
AllMusic	4/5 stars
Exclaim!	8/10
The Guardian	4/5 stars
Loud and Quiet	8/10
MusicOMH	4/5 stars
The Times	3/5 stars

Le Kov was met with "universal acclaim" reviews from critics. At Metacritic, which assigns a weighted average rating out of 100 to reviews from mainstream publications, this release received an average score of 81 based on 13 reviews. Aggregator Album of the Year gave the release an 80 out of 100 based on a critical consensus of 17 reviews.

Will Hodgkinson of The Times gave the album three out of five stars. Helia Phoenix of Caught by the River praised the album, and linked Le Kov with the world's displaced people, who are forced to abandon their language and culture. Phoenix described the album's music as "psychedelic" and compared Gwenno to Boards of Canada and Jane Birkin. Michael Hann of The Guardian was also positive, giving Le Kov four out of five stars. Hann was dismissive towards Gwenno's Cornish language, but praised the music: "It’s the melodies that will keep people coming back: purposeful and direct, but deliciously blurry, reminiscent of Broadcast in their creation of a psychedelia that looks backwards and forwards simultaneously." The album was nominated in the 2018, AIM Independent Music Awards for 'Best Sophomore Release'. The album was also shortlisted for the Welsh Music Prize. This is the annual music prize awarded for the best album from Wales.

=== Accolades ===
Publication	Country	Accolade	Year	Rank
The Guardian	United Kingdom	50 best albums of 2018	2018	39
Mojo	United Kingdom	MOJO’s Top 75 Albums of 2018	2018	29
PopMatters	United States	PopMatters: 70 Best Albums of 2018	2018	61
The Quietus	United Kingdom	Quietus: Albums of the Year 2018	2018	96
Rough Trade Records	United Kingdom	Top 100 Albums of the year	2018	34
Uncut Magazine	United Kingdom	Top 50 Albums of the year	2018	32
Under the Radar	United States	Under the Radar Top 100 Albums of 2018	2018	37

== Track listing ==
No.	Title	Length
1.	"Hi A Skoellyas Liv A Dhagrow"	5:35
2.	"Tir Ha Mor"	4:10
3.	"Herdhya"	2:49
4.	"Eus Keus?"	5:00
5.	"Jynn-amontya"	5:50
6.	"Den Heb Taves"	6:22
7.	"Daromres Y'n Howl"	3:17
8.	"Aremorika"	3:11
9.	"Hunros"	2:32
10.	"Koweth Ker"	5:42

== Charts ==
Chart (2018)	Peak position
UK Independent Albums (OCC)	13
Scottish Albums (OCC)	98
