= Gwenno =

Welsh indie pop singer (born 1981)

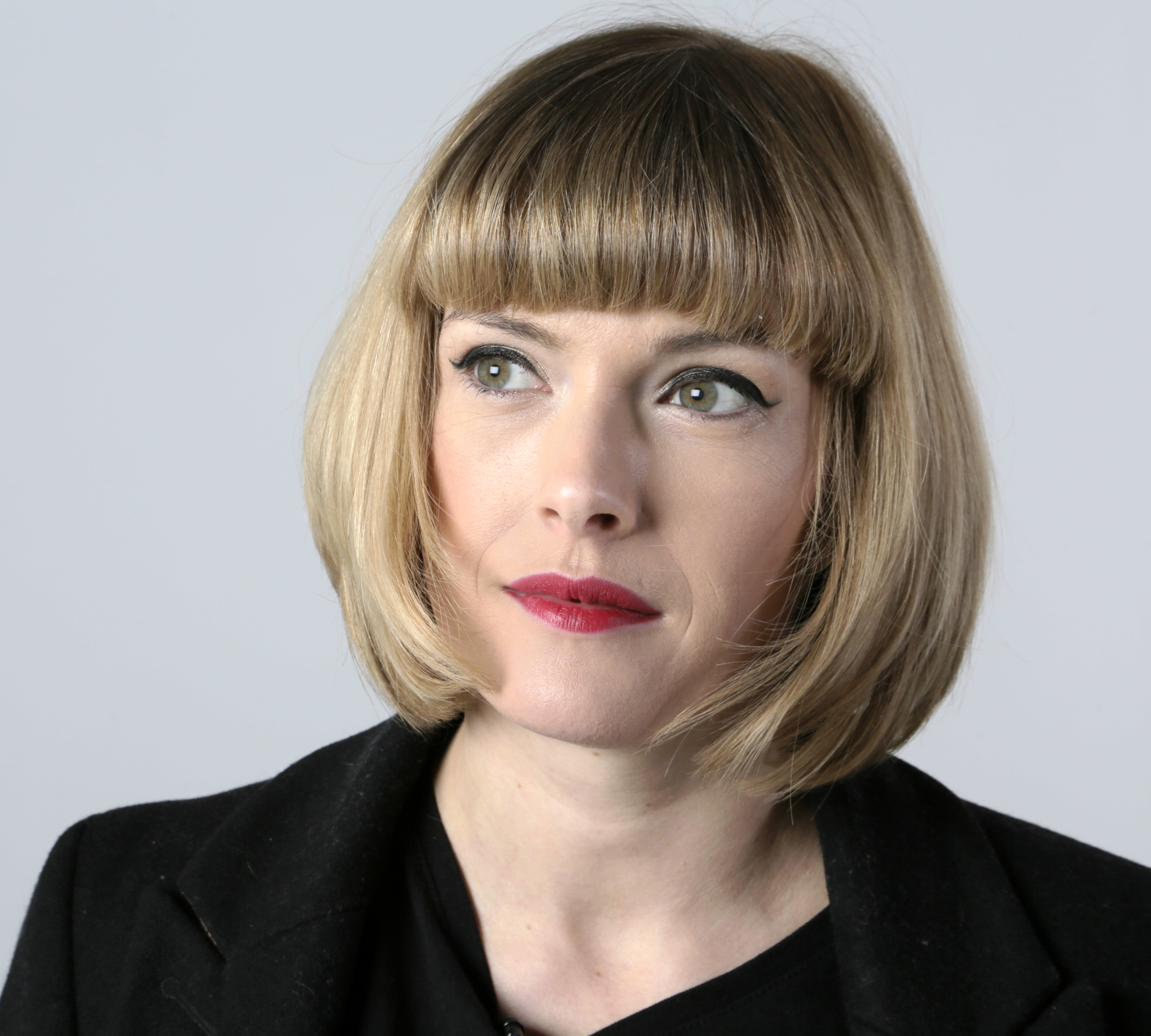
- Gwenno in 2016

Background information
- Born: Gwenno Mererid Saunders; 23 May 1981 (age 45); Cardiff, Wales
- Genres: Electropop; indie pop
- Occupations: Musician; singer; dancer
- Years active: 2002–present
- Labels: Peski; Heavenly
- Formerly of: The Pipettes
- Website: www.gwenno.info

Gwenno Mererid Saunders (born 23 May 1981) is a Welsh-Cornish musician, known mononymously as Gwenno, who has received critical acclaim in the UK. After a series of EPs, she released four albums as a solo artist: Y Dydd Olaf (2014), a Welsh Music Prize winner; Le Kov (2018), her first album in Cornish; Tresor (2022), which was shortlisted for the Mercury Prize; and Utopia (2025).

She was also a singer in the indie pop group the Pipettes, whose debut We Are the Pipettes was described by Pitchfork as "a classic modern indie-pop album".

== Early life ==
Saunders was born in Cardiff in 1981. She is the daughter of Cornish poet and linguist Tim Saunders and Lyn Mererid, who is an activist and member of the choir Côr Cochion Caerdydd and works as a translator. When she grew up, her father spoke Cornish; her mother spoke Welsh.

From the age of five she attended the Seán Éireann-McMahon Academy of Irish Dance and was a cast member of Michael Flatley's productions of Lord of the Dance and Feet of Flames by the age of 17, playing a lead role in a Las Vegas production of the former. In 2001 she had a role in the Welsh language soap opera Pobol y Cwm on S4C, for whom she would later host her own programme Ydy Gwenno'n Gallu...? She is fluent in Welsh and Cornish. On 18 April 2019 she presented "Songs from the Edgelands", a programme about songs in minority languages on BBC Radio 4.

== Music career ==
=== Early career (2002–2010) ===
In the years before she joined the Pipettes, she had been a solo electropop singer, mostly in the Welsh and Cornish languages, releasing two solo EPs, Môr Hud (2002) and Vodya (2004). Saunders represented Cornwall in the Liet International song contest, 2003, and won the People's Choice Award for her performance of "Vodya". In December 2004, Gwenno filmed the song "Ysolt y'nn Gweinten" by Celtic Legend for Classic FM TV. It is claimed to be the first video produced in the Cornish language, the text having been written by her father Tim Saunders with music by Cornish composer Chris John Payne, former keyboard player for Gary Numan.

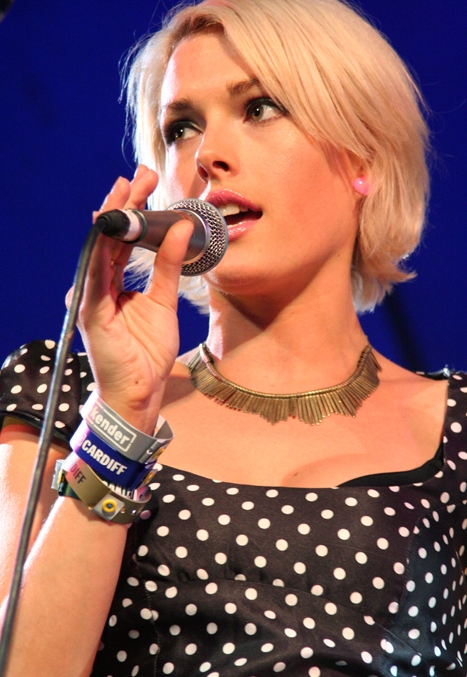
Gwenno performing with the Pipettes in 2006

Gwenno joined the Pipettes in April 2005 after founding member Julia left. She is most notable for her lead vocals on the single "Pull Shapes" and the chorus of "Your Kisses Are Wasted on Me". She later posted solo material to her Myspace page and made a free download of a mini album titled U & I available in October 2007. In April 2008, Gwenno's younger sister Ani joined the Pipettes, after the departure of singers Rosay and RiotBecki. Ani now also releases music with the band The Lovely Wars and solo under the name Ani Glass.

=== Solo career (2010–present) ===
Gwenno toured as a synth player with Pnau and Elton John in 2012.

In June 2012, Saunders released a five-song Welsh-language EP, Ymbelydredd, available on hand-painted cassettes on Peski Records.

Gwenno appears on The Boy Least Likely To's 2013 album The Great Perhaps, contributing vocals to the track "It Could've Been Me".

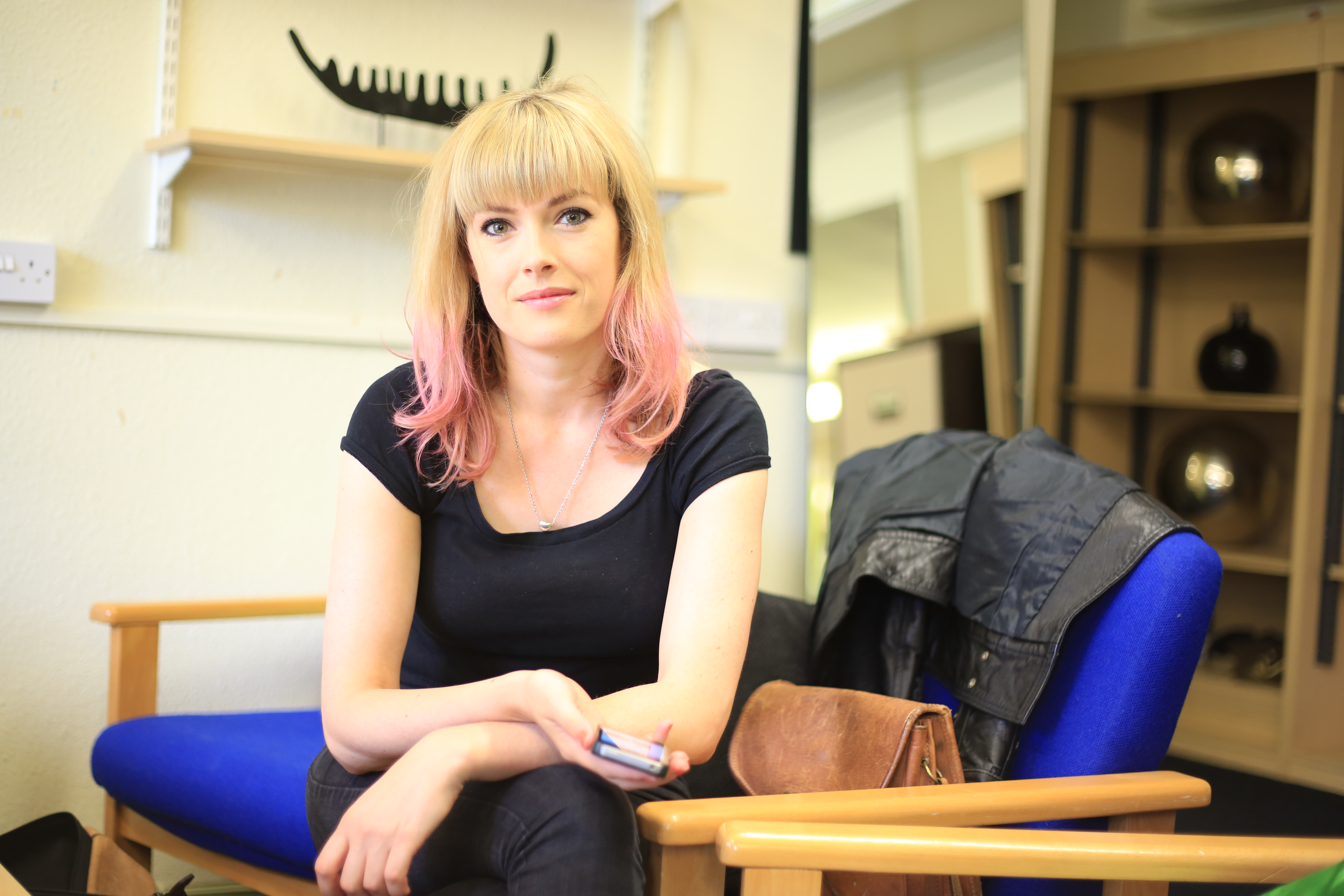
Gwenno in 2014

She released her first solo full-length album, the Welsh-language Y Dydd Olaf, in October 2014 on Peski Records. This album was inspired in part by the dystopian science fiction book of the same name by Owain Owain. In May 2015, Gwenno was signed to Heavenly Recordings. The label re-released her debut album in July. The album won Best Welsh Album at the 2015 National Eisteddfod and in November 2015 won the 2014–2015 Welsh Music Prize.

Gwenno also co-produced and co-hosted a Welsh radio show on Cardiff Radio, Cam O'r Tywyllwch (A Step Away from the Darkness), with her Peski Records colleagues. The team was also behind the CAM '15 music festival in Cardiff, which took place in April 2015 and featured the first live performance in over 20 years by Welsh post-punk pioneers Datblygu.

She released her second solo album Le Kov in 2018, which was all in the Cornish language. It centred on themes of "the struggle of Kernewek [the Cornish language] and the concerns of Cornish cultural visibility as the perceptions of a timeless and haunted landscape often clash with the reality of intense poverty and an economy devastated by the demands of tourism". The album saw Gwenno touring and headlining in Europe and Australia, and supporting acts such as Suede and the Manic Street Preachers, with whom she re-recorded a verse of the song "Spectators of Suicide" in Welsh, as well as singing on an English version of the song with the band. A successful performance of "Tir Ha Mor" on Later... with Jools Holland prompted wider conversations on the state of the Cornish language with Michael Portillo, Jon Snow, and Nina Nannar. Le Kov was named one of the best albums of 2018 by The Guardian, Uncut and Mojo.

Her third solo album Tresor, also a Cornish language album, releases on 1 July 2022 on Heavenly Recordings. It is inspired by powerful woman writers and artists such as Ithell Colquhoun, the Cornish language poet Phoebe Proctor, Maya Deren and Monica Sjöö, Tresor is an intimate view of the feminine interior experience, of domesticity and desire, a rare glimmer of life lived in and expressed through Cornish. On 26 July, Tresor became Gwenno's first album to be nominated for the Mercury Prize, and it was named one of the albums of the year by BBC Radio 6 Music.

On 7 April 2025, Gwenno announced her fourth solo album, Utopia, set for release on 11 July by Heavenly. The lead single, "Dancing on Volcanoes", was released with the announcement. The album is her first primarily in the English language.

== Cultural influence ==
In December 2015, a giant mural of Saunders was erected on the wall of Clwb Ifor Bach on Womanby Street in Cardiff's city centre.

In October 2018, the Cornish Language Board claimed that Saunders's album Le Kov had contributed to a 15% increase in the number of people taking Cornish language exams during 2018.

Wales Arts Review included two of Gwenno's albums on their 2021 list of the greatest Welsh albums of all-time: Le Kov at 18 and Y Dydd Olaf at 64.

== Personal life ==
Saunders is married to musician and producer Rhys Edwards, who is behind the project Jakokoyak, and they have two children.

Saunders is a supporter of Welsh independence. She has said: "What if there are other ways of co-existing? What if we can organise ourselves differently? There is an innate anarchy to art and an absolute potential in utilising it for the good whilst imagining better futures. We want to continue a conversation about an inclusive self-determination by drawing on our past, embracing our neighbours across the UK and the world with open arms, whilst also making sure that we're singing along to the best possible tune". She was made a Bard of the Cornish Gorsedh in 2019 for "services to the Cornish language through music and the media".

== Discography ==
=== Solo ===
==== Albums ====
Year	Name	Label	Format	Language
2014	Y Dydd Olaf	Peski, Heavenly	Digital download, CD, vinyl	Welsh, Cornish
2018	Le Kov	Heavenly	Digital download, CD, vinyl	Cornish
2022	Tresor	Heavenly	Digital download, CD, vinyl	Cornish, Welsh
2025	Utopia	Heavenly	Digital download, CD, vinyl	English, Welsh, Cornish

==== EPs ====
Year	Name	Label	Format	Language
2002	Môr Hud	Recordiau Sain	Digital download	Welsh, Cornish, English
2003	Vodya	Recordiau Sain	Digital download	Welsh, Cornish, English
2007	U & I	None	Digital download	English
2012	Ymbelydredd	Peski	Digital download, cassette	Welsh

=== With the Pipettes ===
Year	Album	Chart positions
Year	Album	UK
2006	We Are the Pipettes	41
2010	Earth vs. the Pipettes	–

=== Appears on ===
Year	Name	Additional information
2003	I'r Brawd Hwdini	Compilation of re-recordings of songs by Meic Stevens

== See also ==
- Julie Fowlis, sings in Scottish Gaelic
- Ruth Keggin, sings in Manx
- Mary Black, sings in Irish
