= Utopia (Gwenno album) =

Studio album by Gwenno
- Released: 11 July 2025
- Studios: Gwenno's home studio, Cardiff
- Genre: Psychedelic pop
- Length: 47:08
- Languages: English; Welsh; Cornish
- Label: Heavenly
- Producers: Rhys Edwards, Gwenno Saunders

Gwenno chronology
Tresor (2022)	Utopia (2025)

Singles from Utopia
- 1. "Dancing on Volcanoes" Released: 7 April 2025; 2. "War" Released: 7 May 2025; 3. "Y Gath" Released: 6 June 2025; 4. "Utopia" Released: 9 July 2025

Utopia is the fourth solo studio album by Welsh singer Gwenno, released on 11 July 2025 by Heavenly Recordings. This album is predominantly in English, although it also has three songs that are not in English, with two of them in Welsh and one in Cornish.

== Background and singles ==
On 7 April 2025, Gwenno announced her fourth solo album, Utopia, set for release on 11 July by Heavenly. The lead single, "Dancing on Volcanoes", was released with the announcement. The album is her first primarily in the English language.

On 7 May 2025, Gwenno released the second single for "War". On 6 June, she released the third single "Y Gath", which features Cate Le Bon and H. Hawkline. On 9 July, she released the fourth and final single "Utopia", which is the album's title track.

== Reception ==
Professional ratings
Aggregate scores
Source	Rating
Metacritic	80/100
Review scores
Source	Rating
AllMusic	3.5/5 stars

Utopia was met with critical acclaim from critics. At Metacritic, which assigns a weighted average rating out of 100 to reviews from mainstream publications, this release received an average score of 80 based on 9 reviews.

== Track listing ==
Utopia track listing
No.	Title	Length
1.	"London 1757"	4:34
2.	"Dancing On Volcanoes"	5:04
3.	"Utopia"	5:08
4.	"Y Gath" (featuring Cate Le Bon and H. Hawkline)	4:08
5.	"War"	4:50
6.	"73"	4:18
7.	"The Devil"	4:38
8.	"Ghost of You"	4:41
9.	"St Ives New School"	5:47
10.	"Hireth"	4:01
Total length:		47:08

== Charts ==
Chart performance for Utopia
Chart (2025)	Peak position
Scottish Albums (Official Charts)	37
UK Album Downloads (Official Charts)	39
UK Independent Albums (Official Charts)	4
