= Jock Scot =

Scottish poet and recording artist

John Graham Manson Leslie (21 September 1952 – 13 April 2016), known as Jock Scot, was a Scottish poet and recording artist.

== Biography ==
Born in Leith, one of seven children, he was raised on a housing estate in Musselburgh, where he was nicknamed "Pooch" Leslie because of his small size. He sold soft drinks locally and worked as a labourer on building sites until 1978, when, at an Ian Dury concert in Edinburgh, he threw his tam o'shanter onto the stage and was subsequently invited backstage. Dury invited him to join his tour party, ending up in London where he moved in with Dury and Clash associate and publicity officer Kosmo Vinyl. He worked for Stiff Records and later Charisma Records, and befriended many of the luminaries of the London punk rock scene, including the members of the Clash, Shane MacGowan, Billy Bragg, and Vivian Stanshall.

Described as a "supplier of good vibes" to his friends, he began going on stage as a warm-up act for bands, reciting his poems. He regularly performed at the Edinburgh Fringe, toured with the band Rip Rig + Panic, and published a book of verse, Where Is My Heroine?, in 1993. The book drew on his earlier experience of heroin addiction in Scotland. In 1997 he recorded an album, My Personal Culloden, made with Davy Henderson of the band The Nectarine No. 9, and described at Allmusic as "a rich, fascinating travelogue through Scot's id, ego, history, and city, all delivered in his robust musical brogue against a backdrop of experimental rock pastiches and grooves." The album was reissued on CD in 2015.

According to his obituary in The Daily Telegraph: "He had startling presence, and a way of investing words with broad and deep meaning, and, with his interest in the Beat poets, horse racing and popular culture, straddled the worlds of London’s pub-land and the aristocratic demi-monde." He was diagnosed with cancer in 2014, but refused chemotherapy and died in 2016, aged 63.

Scot had three daughters, one of whom Poppy Chancellor, with actress Anna Chancellor, with whom he had lived in West London. Poppy died from leukaemia on 29 September 2023 aged 36.
