= Y Dydd Olaf =

Studio album by Gwenno
- Released: 27 October 2014 (Peski); 24 July 2015 (Heavenly)
- Genres: Electropop, dream pop
- Length: 43:12
- Languages: Welsh; Cornish
- Labels: Peski Records (limited release); Heavenly Recordings
- Producer: Rhys Edwards

Gwenno chronology
Y Dydd Olaf (2014)	Le Kov (2018)

Singles from Y Dydd Olaf
- 1. "Fratolish Hiang Perpeshki (Tim Gane Remix)"

Y Dydd Olaf (Welsh for 'The Last Day') is the first solo album by Welsh-Cornish singer-songwriter Gwenno. It was her fifth solo release after four previous EPs.

== Background ==
The album was initially released on a small scale by the independent Peski Records label in October 2014 and sold out completely. It was re-released worldwide in 2015 by Heavenly Recordings. The album was an attempt by Gwenno to combine her political views with sounds she loves and was inspired in part by a dystopian science fiction book of the same name by Owain Owain which was released in 1976. Since the album was released, permission for an English translation of Owain's book was granted, 40 years after it was first published in Welsh. The album is sung predominantly in Welsh with the final track, Amser, being a musical rendition of a Cornish poem by her father, Tim Saunders. Gwenno has said she used the book's title as it had inspired her to return to singing in her first language.

The album began as a collection of recordings of everyday sounds Gwenno had collected over a number of years, including field recordings in Cardiff Bay. She sampled these sounds to create rhythm tracks and built the songs up from there, saying she "really wanted to get to the bottom of the idea of creating a soundscape before coming up with any sort of song" and has said she aims to use "less music to make more".

== Reception ==
Professional ratings
Aggregate scores
Source	Rating
AnyDecentMusic?	7.5/10
Metacritic	83/100
Review scores
Source	Rating
AllMusic	4/5 stars
Clash	8/10
Drowned in Sound	8/10
Financial Times	4/5 stars
Mojo	4/5 stars
Now	4/5
Pitchfork	8.0/10
Q	4/5 stars
Record Collector	4/5 stars
Uncut	8/10

The album received critical acclaim and won the Welsh Music Prize and the Welsh-language album of the Year in 2015. It was also chosen by readers of Y Selar, a Welsh music magazine, as the 4th best album of 2014, and by AllMusic as one of the best Indie Records of 2015. London's Loud and Quiet called it the second best album of 2015. God Is in the TV critic Bill Cummings drew comparisons to Saint Etienne, OMD, Can and Chromatics, while observing an album that is "utterly futuristic and unique in equal measure". Cummings summarised Y Dydd Olaf as "a bricolage of sensuous yet impactful pop songs to intrigue, provoke and delight, and one of the best Welsh albums you will hear this year".

== Track listing ==
All tracks written by Gwenno.

No.	Title	English translation	Length
1.	"Chwyldro"	Revolution	5:18
2.	"Patriarchaeth"	Patriarchy	3:29
3.	"Calon Peiriant"	Heart of the machine	5:08
4.	"Sisial y Môr"	The whispering sea	5:41
5.	"Dawns y Blaned Dirion"	Dance of the True Planet	1:30
6.	"Golau Arall"	Another Light	3:31
7.	"Stwff"	Stuff	4:59
8.	"Y Dydd Olaf"	The Last Day	4:15
9.	"Fratolish Hiang Perpeshki"	Fratolish Hiang Perpeshki	4:37
10.	"Amser"	Time	4:44

== Release history ==
Country	Date	Label
Wales	27 October 2014	Peski Records
Worldwide	24 July 2015	Heavenly Recordings
