= Anna Chancellor =

English actress

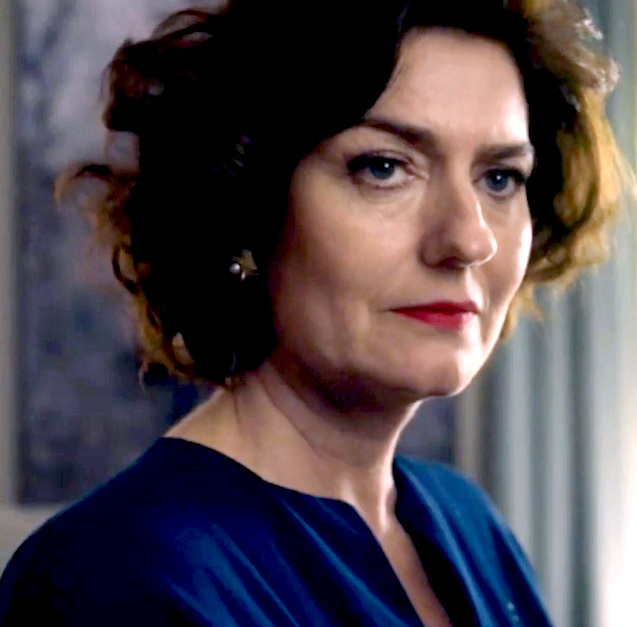
- Chancellor in 2018
- Born: Anna Theodora Chancellor; 27 April 1965 (age 61); Richmond, Surrey, England
- Occupation: Actress
- Years active: 1990–present
- Spouse: Nigel Willoughby (1993–98, divorced)
- Children: Poppy
- Relatives: Edward Chancellor (brother); Cecilia Chancellor (first cousin); Helena Bonham Carter (second cousin); Jane Austen (8x great-aunt)

Anna Theodora Chancellor (born 27 April 1965) is an English actress who has appeared widely on television and film and in the theatre. She received a nomination for BAFTA TV Award for Best Supporting Actress for her role as Lix Storm in The Hour (2011–2012) and has twice been nominated for Olivier Awards, in 1997 for her performances in Stanley at the National Theatre and again in 2014 for Private Lives at the Gielgud Theatre. She was also nominated for an award at the Monte-Carlo TV Festival in 2007 and for one at the Broadcasting Press Guild Awards in 2013.

On television, she is also known for her roles in the ITV series Kavanagh QC (1995–1997) and Grantchester (2016); the BBC series Pride and Prejudice (1995), Tipping the Velvet (2002), Spooks (2005–2007), Pramface (2012–2014), Ordeal by Innocence (2018) and Rain Dogs (2023); the Channel 5 series Suburban Shootout (2006–2007); the Netflix series The Crown (2017); the Epix series Pennyworth (2019–2021); the BritBox series Hotel Portofino (2022) and the Amazon Prime Video series My Lady Jane (2024).

Her films include Four Weddings and a Funeral (1994), The Hitchhiker's Guide to the Galaxy (2005) and How I Live Now (2013).

== Early life and education ==
Anna Theodora Chancellor was born on 27 April 1965 in Richmond, England, to publisher John Paget Chancellor and Hon. Mary Jolliffe, a daughter of Lord Hylton. Her father was the son of Sir Christopher Chancellor and Sylvia Mary Paget, a daughter of Sir Richard Paget and philanthropist Lady Muriel, daughter of Murray Finch-Hatton, 12th Earl of Winchilsea. The Chancellor family were Scottish landed gentry who had owned land at Quothquan since 1432.

Chancellor is a niece of the journalist Alexander Chancellor, a great-granddaughter of Raymond Asquith (son of the Liberal prime minister H. H. Asquith), a first cousin of both the actress Dolly Wells and the model Cecilia Chancellor, a second cousin of the actress Helena Bonham Carter. Chancellor was also the great niece of Jane Austen eight generations removed through Edward Austen Knight. Chancellor has said that she had worked hard to become an actress, and her lineage does not define who she is.

Chancellor was brought up in Somerset and educated at St Mary's School, Shaftesbury, a Roman Catholic boarding school for girls in Dorset, but left at sixteen to live in London, later describing her early years there as "quite wild".

She studied acting at the London Academy of Music and Dramatic Art. In her early twenties she married the poet Jock Scot (1952–2016), whom she met at LAMDA, and with whom she had a daughter in 1988. She separated from Scot a few years later.

== Career ==
Chancellor got her first acting role on television playing Mercedes Page in Jupiter Moon, a BSkyB soap, then came a commercial for Boddingtons beer and a part in the film Four Weddings and a Funeral (1994), playing Henrietta (nicknamed "Duckface") opposite Hugh Grant.

She played Julia Piper in series 1 to 3 of Kavanagh QC. She also played Caroline Bingley in the 1995 BBC adaptation of Pride and Prejudice.

In 1997 she was nominated for the Laurence Olivier Award for Best Actress in a Supporting Role for her performance in Stanley at the Royal National Theatre-Cottesloe.

She played Questular Rontok in The Hitchhiker's Guide to the Galaxy (2005). The same year, she joined the cast of BBC One television drama series Spooks as Juliet Shaw. She has also appeared in The Vice, Karaoke, Cold Lazarus, The Dreamers, Tipping the Velvet (2002), and Fortysomething, and had a leading role in the satirical black comedy Suburban Shootout.

In 2011 she took a supporting role as Lix Storm in the BBC thriller serial The Hour, for which she was nominated for the BAFTA TV Award for Best Supporting Actress at the 2012 British Academy Television Awards.

In 2014 she was nominated for the Laurence Olivier Award for Best Actress for her part in Private Lives at the Gielgud Theatre.

== Charity ==
She is a patron of the London children's charity Scene & Heard.

== Personal life ==
Chancellor had one daughter, Poppy, with poet Jock Scot. Poppy died from leukaemia on 29 September 2023 aged 36.

== Filmography ==
Key
†	Denotes works that have not yet been released

=== Film ===
Year	Film	Role	Notes
1990	Killing Dad or How to Love Your Mother	Barmaid	
1993	Century	Woman in Police Station	
1994	Four Weddings and a Funeral	Henrietta ‘Duck Face’– Wedding Four	
1994	Tom and Viv	Woman	
1994	Staggered	Carmen Svennipeg	
1994	Princess Caraboo	Mrs. Peake	
1997	FairyTale: A True Story	Peter Pan	
1997	The Man Who Knew Too Little	Barbara Ritchie	
1999	Heart	Nicola Farmer	
2001	Crush	Molly Cartwright	
2003	What a Girl Wants	Glynnis Payne	
2003	The Dreamers	Mother	
2003	Confused		Short film
2004	Agent Cody Banks 2: Destination London	Lady Josephine Kenworth	
2005	The Hitchhiker's Guide to the Galaxy	Questular Rontok	
2005	Feeder	Doctor	Short film
2005	The Best Man	Dana	
2006	Breaking and Entering	Kate	
2007	St. Trinians	Miss Bagstock	
2010	Critical Eye	Laura	
2011	Hysteria	Mrs Bellamy	
2012	More Afraid of You	Lucy	Short film
2013	How I Live Now	Aunt Penn	
2013	Confessions of an Alien Abductee	Narrator	
2013	Noël Coward's Private Lives	Amanda Prynne	
2014	Death Knight Love Story	Miria	Voice role
2014	Testament of Youth	Mrs. Leighton	
2016	The Carer	Milly	
2016	This Beautiful Fantastic	Bramble	
2017	Love of My Life	Grace	
2018	The Happy Prince	Mrs Arbuthnot	
2018	Benjamin	Tessa	
2018	Nativity Rocks!	Clara Hargreaves	
2019	For Love or Money	Carol	
2020	Come Away	Eleanor Murrow	Film
2022	Mrs. Harris Goes to Paris	Lady Dant	
2022	Stromboli	Diane	

=== Television ===
Year	Film	Role	Notes
1990–1996	Jupiter Moon	Mercedes Page	50 episodes
1992	Inspector Morse	Sally Smith	Episode: "Cherubim and Seraphim"
1993	Agatha Christie's Poirot	Virginie Mesnard	Episode: "The Chocolate Box"
1993	Comedy Playhouse	Julia	Episode: "The Complete Guide to Relationships"
1994	Ellington	Ally Stone	TV film
1995	Pride & Prejudice	Caroline Bingley	Miniseries; 6 episodes
1995–1997	Kavanagh QC	Julia Piper	11 episodes
1996	Karaoke	Anna Griffiths	Miniseries; 4 episodes
1996	Cold Lazarus	Anna Griffiths	Miniseries; 3 episodes
1999	The Vice	Dr. Christina Weir	6 episodes
2000	Longitude	Muriel Gould	TV film
2001	The Cazalets	Diana Mackintosh	6 episodes
2002	Tipping the Velvet	Diana Lethaby	2 episodes
2002	The Real Jane Austen	Herself/host	TV special
2003	Georgian Underworld	Narrator	Episode: "Queer as 18th Century Folk"
2003	Doc Martin and the Legend of the Cloutie	Nicky Bowden	TV film
2003	Fortysomething	Estelle Slippery	6 episodes
2004	Blue Dove	Maria Bishop	2 episodes
2004	Roman Road	Maddy Bancroft	TV film
2005	A Waste of Shame: Shakespeare and His Sonnets	Anne Hathaway	TV film
2005–2007	Spooks	Juliet Shaw	15 episodes
2006	Rebus	Amanda Morrison	Episode: "Let It Bleed"
2006	The Secret Life of Mrs Beeton	Elizabeth Dorling	TV film
2006–2007	Suburban Shootout	Camilla Diamond	11 episodes
2007	Sherlock Holmes and the Baker Street Irregulars	Irene Adler	TV film
2007	Christmas at the Riviera	Diane	TV film
2008	My Family	Zelda Nobbs	Episode: "Cards on the Table"
2008	Agatha Christie's Marple: Murder Is Easy	Lydia Horton	TV film
2009	Law & Order: UK	Evelyn Wyndham	2 episodes
2010	Silent Witness	Chief Supt. Karen Somerville	2 episodes
2010	Miranda	Helena	Episode: "A New Low"
2011	Hustle	Wendy Stanton	Episode: "As Good as it Gets"
2011	Waking the Dead	Lucy Christie	2 episodes
2011	Lewis	Judith Suskin	Episode: "The Gift of Promise"
2011	Hidden	Elspeth Verney	4 episodes
2011–2012	The Hour	Lix Storm	12 episodes Nom – BAFTA TV Award for Best Supporting Actress; Nom – Broadcasting Press Guild Award for Best Actress
2012–2014	Pramface	Janet Derbyshire	14 episodes
2012	We'll Take Manhattan	Lucie Clayton	TV film
2013	A Touch of Cloth	Hope Goodgirl	2 episodes
2014	Inside No. 9	Elizabeth	Episode: "Sardines"
2014	Fleming: The Man Who Would Be Bond	Second Officer Monday	4 episodes
2014	Penny Dreadful	Claire Ives	1 episode
2014	Downton Abbey	Lady Anstruther	1 episode
2014	Mapp & Lucia	Emmeline 'Lucia' Lucas	3 episodes
2016	Shetland	Phyllis Brennan	4 episodes
2016	New Blood	Eleanor Davies	7 episodes
2016	Grantchester	Aunt Cece	Christmas special
2016	Flowers	Aunty Viv	1 episode
2017	The Crown	Lady Rosse	Episode: "Matrimonium"
2018	Ordeal by Innocence	Rachel Argyll	3 episodes
2018	Trust	Penelope Kittson	5 episodes
2019	Death in Paradise	Ciss Dacre	Episode: "Frappe Death Day"
2019	Timewasters	Victoria	5 episodes
2019–2021	Pennyworth	Dr. Frances Gaunt	7 episodes
2020–2022	The Split	Melanie Aickman	Series 2-3
2021	The Watch	Lord Vetinari	Main role
2022	Hotel Portofino	Lady Latchmere	Main role
2022	That Dirty Black Bag	Hellen	TV Series
2023	Rain Dogs	Allegra	
2024	My Lady Jane	Lady Frances Grey	8 episodes
2025	Outrageous	Sydney Bowles	
2025	The Girlfriend	Lillith Greenway	3 episodes
2026	My Brilliant Career	Mrs Bossier	

== Theatre ==
- Boston Marriage, Donmar Warehouse – March–April 2001; Donmar in the West End – November 2001–February 2002
- Mammals at the Oxford Playhouse and touring – Lorna, January 2006
- Never So Good, National Theatre – summer 2008
- The Observer, National Theatre – spring 2009
- The Last of the Duchess, Hampstead Theatre – October–November 2011
- Private Lives (playing Amanda), Chichester Festival Theatre, September 2012, and the Gielgud Theatre, London (July–September 2013)
- The Wolf From the Door, Royal Court Theatre, September–November 2014
- The Seagull by Anton Chekhov at National Theatre – summer 2016

== Audiobooks ==
Chancellor has played the role of Ann Smiley in BBC dramatisations of the John le Carré novels Call for the Dead, Tinker Tailor Soldier Spy, The Honourable Schoolboy and Smiley's People.

== Awards and nominations ==
Year	Award	Category	Nominated work	Result	Ref.
1997	Laurence Olivier Awards	Best Actress in a Supporting Role	Stanley, at RNT Cottesloe	Nominated	
2007	Monte-Carlo TV Festival	Golden Nymph, Outstanding Actress Comedy Series	Suburban Shootout	Nominated	
2012	BAFTA TV Awards	BAFTA TV Award for Best Supporting Actress	The Hour	Nominated	
2013	Broadcasting Press Guild Awards	BPG Award for Best Actress	Pramface and The Hour	Nominated	
2014	Laurence Olivier Awards	Best Actress	Private Lives at Gielgud Theatre	Nominated	
