= Tim Saunders =

Cornish poet

- Born: St Tudy, Cornwall, England
- Citizenship: British
- Occupations: Writer and poet
- Spouses: Lyn Mererid; Helen Ceridwen Price
- Children: Gwenno Saunders; Ani Saunders; Meirion Carwyn Saunders

Tim Saunders is a Cornish poet and journalist primarily writing in the Cornish language who also writes in the Welsh, Irish, and Breton languages. He is resident in Cardiff but is of Cornish descent. He is a literary historian and editor of 'The Wheel' – an anthology of modern poetry in Cornish 1850–1980. High Tide is a collection of his own poems in Cornish from the years 1974 to 1999. He was made bard of the Gorsedh Kernow in 1998, taking the bardic name Bardh Gwerin (Poet of the People).

Tim's daughters, Gwenno and Ani Saunders, are musical artists who write and sing in Cornish, Welsh, and English. Gwenno was nominated for the Mercury Prize for her album Tresor (album) in 2022.

== Standard Written Form ==
Saunders has spoken out against the development of a Standard Written Form of Cornish, saying

The insulting notion that we are so stupid as to need 'impartial outside experts' to settle our differences is, quite simply, contemptible. Such transparent chicanery would require scholars having limited acquaintance with the Cornish-speaking community, and no accountability, to lay down the law for it. No reputable academic would destroy his or her own reputation by taking up such a patronizing stance.

== Selected list of works ==
- 1977: Teithiau (Cyfres y beirdd answyddogol). Y Lolfa. (Author)
- 1985: Gohebydd Arbennig. Y Lolfa. (Author)
- 1986: Cliff Preis: Darlithydd Coleg. Y Lolfa. (Author)
- 1994: Saer Swyn a Storiau Eraill o Gernyw. Gomer Press. (Author)
- 1999: The Wheel: An Anthology of Modern Poetry in Cornish 1850–1980. Francis Boutle Publishers. (Editor)
- 2003: Gol Snag Bud Ha Gwersyow Whath. Spyrys a Gernow. (Author)
- 2003: Cornish is Fun: An Informal Course in Living Cornish. Y Lolfa. (Translator)
- 2006: Nothing Broken: Recent Poetry in Cornish. Francis Boutle Publishers. (Editor)
