= Ani Glass =

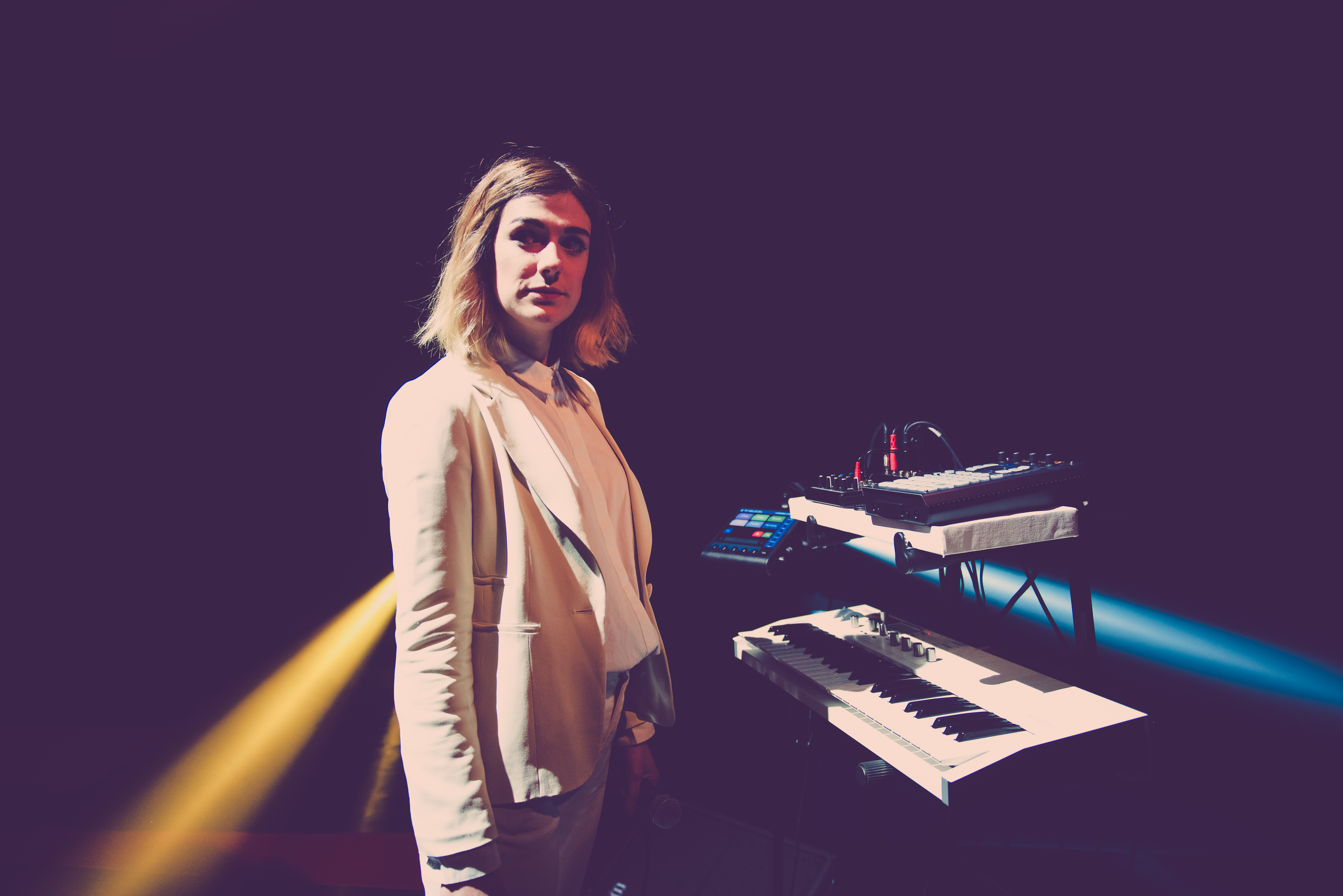

Background information
- Born: Anna Eiluned Saunders
- Genres: Electronic Pop
- Formerly of: The Pipettes, Genie Queen, The Lovely Wars
- Website: https://aniglass.bandcamp.com/

Anna Eiluned Saunders (born 20 October 1984 in Cardiff) is a Welsh-Cornish musician better known under her stage name, Ani Glass. She is also an artist, producer and a photographer and has studied for a PhD in Economical and Regional Development at Cardiff University.

== Biography ==
Her sister is the Cornish-Welsh singer Gwenno and her father is Tim Saunders, the Cornish poet and journalist, known for his writing in Cornish, Welsh, Irish and Breton. Saunders was raised speaking both Cornish and Welsh at home.

== Musical career ==
=== Early career (2004–2011) ===
Glass's musical influences include OMD, the Human League and Trevor Horn. Before joining her sister in The Pipettes in 2008, Glass was a member of the group ‘Genie Queen’, a band whose former members included Abbey Clancy; they were managed by OMD's Andy McCluskey. As a member of The Pipettes, she wrote and recorded the second album of the group, Earth vs The Pipettes in 2010.

=== After The Pipettes (2011– 2020) ===
After The Pipettes disbanded in 2011, Glass returned to Cardiff. She was a founding member of The Lovely Wars before releasing Ffôl (Foolish), her first solo single in 2015. Ffôl was chosen as single of the week on BBC Radio Cymru and was also played on BBC 6 music. Her first EP, Ffrwydrad Tawel (Silent Explosion) was released in 2017 and is a celebration of an art exhibition of the same name by Welsh artist Ivor Davies.

Her first album, Mirores (Observer), was released in 2020 with songs in Cornish, English and Welsh. The album won Welsh Album of the year in the National Eisteddfod in 2020 and reached the shortlist for the Welsh Music Award 2020.

=== Ennill yn Barod and Phantasmagoria (2020 - now) ===
In 2022 Glass released the track Ennill yn Barod (We've won already) to celebrate the Welsh national football team participating in the World Cup.

In 2025 Glass received a grant from the PRS Foundation. This funding is to allow her to complete her second album, Phantasmagoria, which draws inspiration from her diagnosis in 2020 of having a rare benign brain tumour. Phantasmagoria includes lyrics in Welsh, Cornish and English and the title track was released on 27th June 2025.

== Ordination as a bard ==
In 2013, she was ordained as a bard of the Gorsedh Kernow in 2013 under the bardic name 'Mirores'.

== Discography ==
=== With The Pipettes ===
Year	Album		
Year	Album	2010	Earth vs. The Pipettes

=== Albums as solo artist ===
Year	Name	Label	Form	Languages
2020	Mirores	Recordiau Neb	Digital download, CD and vinyl	Welsh, Cornish and English

=== Solo releases ===
Year	Name	Form	Language/s
2015	"Ffôl" / "Little Things"	Digital download	Welsh and English
2016	Y Ddawns	Digital download	Welsh
2017	Ffrwydrad Tawel	Digital download	Welsh
2018	Peirianwaith Perffaith	Digital Download	Welsh
2020	Ynys Araul	Digital download	Welsh
2022	Ennill yn Barod	Digital Download	Welsh
