= The Last Day (novel) =

1967 Welsh science fiction novel

- Frontispiece of 1976 edition
- Author: Owain Owain
- Original title: Y Dydd Olaf
- Language: Welsh
- Genre: Science fiction
- Publication date: 1976 (first version); 2021 (revised version)
- Publication place: Wales
- English publication date: 2024

The Last Day (Welsh: Y Dydd Olaf) is a Welsh science fiction novel by Owain Owain, written in 1968 and first published in 1976. It was significantly revised and reprinted until the definitive version in 2021. It was also published in Cornish (2020), English (2024) and Polish (2025). It is one of the most famous novels in the Welsh language. In October 2014, the novel gave great influence to inspire singer Gwenno Saunders to compose and publish the music album with the same name; the album received critical acclaim and was chosen by Allmusic as one of the best Indie Records of 2015. London's Loud and Quiet called it the second best album of 2015.

== Writing and publication ==
In an introduction to the novel, Welsh literary critic Pennar Davies said, "Nothing like this book has been seen in our language before, nor anything similar in any language. We rejoice that this kind of brilliance is possible in the Welsh language". It is described by Wales Literature Exchange as "...a science fiction cult classic...".

== Adaptions and translations ==
The 2020 translation into Cornish was written by Sam Brown, as an ebook, free of charge. In July 2021 a reprint was published in Welsh by Gwasg y Bwthyn, Caernarfon after the book had been out of print for almost 50 years. However, the cover was changed into a new version. In 2024 the English version was published by Parthian Books, translated by Emyr Wallace Humphreys. In 2025 a Polish translation "Ostatni dzień" was published by Wydawnictwo Wolski, translated by Marta Listewnik.

== Themes ==
The primary theme explores the concept of technological dominance over humanity. This topic has become highly relevant in recent years, as the capacity of artificial intelligence continues to expand exponentially year by year. The pressing question remains: will humanity be able to control this advancing technology, or will we be controlled by it?

Other significant scientific themes include the development of complete diet pellets that can provide all necessary nutrition, the creation of androids and clones, neutral-gendered humans, and the exploration of transhumanism. Additionally, eco-fascism and the concept of reducing the population for the benefit of the planet, along with examining the limits of computer processing power are important discussions within the novel.

== Characters ==
- Marc is a young man whose excerpts from diaries and letters show how society slips into the grip of a fascist, totalitarian government. Every now and then Marc slips into the synthetic language of the Brotherhood: 'Fratolish Hiang Perpeski'. This shows the effectiveness of the conditioning he is trying to escape from. The novel is a stark warning of the silent, effective indoctrination by the media and government, by molding the rich diversity of language and cultures into a grey, uniform body.

== See also ==
- Artificial intelligence
