= Joe Van Moyland =

Joe Lean/Joe van Moyland
- Also known as: Joe Lean
- Born: Joseph Antony Bernays; 1983 (age 42–43); York, England
- Genres: Indie rock and indie pop
- Years active: 2003–2011, 2017
- Formerly of: Joe Lean and the Jing Jang Jong; The Pipettes

Joseph Antony Bernays is an English former singer, drummer and actor who works under the pseudonyms Joe van Moyland and Joe Lean. He was frontman in the band Joe Lean and the Jing Jang Jong and previously drummed for The Pipettes. As an actor, he was best known for his role as Thomas Tallis on The Tudors.

== Career ==
=== Acting career ===
Bernays appeared in a number of television shows, most notably in The Tudors, where he played composer Thomas Tallis in 2007. He also appeared in Peep Show as Sophie's brother Jamie, Nathan Barley as Mudd, and three episodes of the Channel 4 drama Fresh Meat as well as minor roles in Waking The Dead, Simon Schama's Power of Art and Fortysomething. His film appearances included Starter for Ten, Colour Me Kubrick: A True...ish Story and Brothers of the Head. He left acting after 2011, aside from a small role in Star Wars: The Last Jedi in 2017. He lived in New York and worked as a writer.

=== Music career ===
Under the name Joe Lean, Bernays fronted Joe Lean and the Jing Jang Jong, who released their first single in October 2007 and have been tipped for success by the NME and finished seventh in the BBC Sound Of 2008 poll. However they disbanded before ever releasing an album. He had previously been drummer for the Pipettes, working under the name Robin of Loxley. His last appearance with the Pipettes was 23 June 2007 on the Pyramid Stage at the Glastonbury Festival. The NME reported that he had written songs for the Sugababes' new album, however in a later interview Van Moyland said that the agreement had fallen through.

== Personal life ==
In the mid-2010s, Bernays decided that he "didn't want to be in front of the camera anymore" and began a career change. In 2020 he moved permanently to Mallorca with his partner, fashion designer Steffy Borras, and their two children, where he opened a bar named Ocho.

== Filmography ==
Year	Title	Role	Notes
2004	Belonging	Luke	Television film
2005	Brothers of the Head	Druggy Friend	
2005	Colour Me Kubrick: A True...ish Story	Spencer	
2006	Starter for 10	Hippy at the Party	
2011	Jane Eyre	Lord Ingram	
2017	Star Wars: The Last Jedi	Temporary Command Center Resistance Pilot No. 1	

== Television ==
Year	Title	Role	Notes
2003	Fortysomething	Edwin Slippery	6 episodes
2005	Nathan Barley	Mudd	4 episodes
2005	Waking the Dead	Stephen	Episode: Straw Dog
2006	Simon Schama's Power of Art	J. M. W. Turner	Episode: Turner
2007	Peep Show	Jamie Chapman	2 episodes
2007	The Tudors	Thomas Tallis	9 episodes
2011	Fresh Meat	Jerry	3 episodes
