= Gaps (album) =

Studio album by Monster Bobby
- Released: (United Kingdom) August 13, 2007 (United States) August 7, 2007
- Genre: Indie pop
- Length: 32:02
- Label: Hypnote Recording Concern

Professional ratings
Review scores
Source	Rating
Allmusic	link
Drowned in Sound	(8/10) link
Spin	link

Gaps is the debut album from Monster Bobby. The title is ironic in that there are no actual "gaps" between songs on the record. It was released on CD in America on August 7, 2007 by Hypnote Recording Concern, followed by a release in the UK a week later on August 13.

== Track listing ==
1. "fresh start" – 0:28
2. "the closest experience to that of being with you is the experience of taking drugs" – 2:00
3. "the postcard" – 2:06
4. "blah blah blah (give up)" – 1:38
5. "last stop, all change" – 2:22
6. "3 days, 14 hours" – 1:06
7. "leave quietly" – 1:24
8. "believed you at the time" – 0:57
9. "i live for yr fleeting touch" – 1:47
10. "i heard you moved away" – 3:10
11. "scopophilia" – 1:08
12. "let's check into a hospital together" – 1:04
13. "once more to lay down beside you" – 1:53
14. "beyond the reach of arms" – 3:21
15. "you going out" – 1:52
16. "bedtime baby" – 3:07
17. "a bureaucracy of angels" – 2:39
