= Joe Lean & The Jing Jang Jong =

English indie rock band

Joe Lean & the Jing Jang Jong
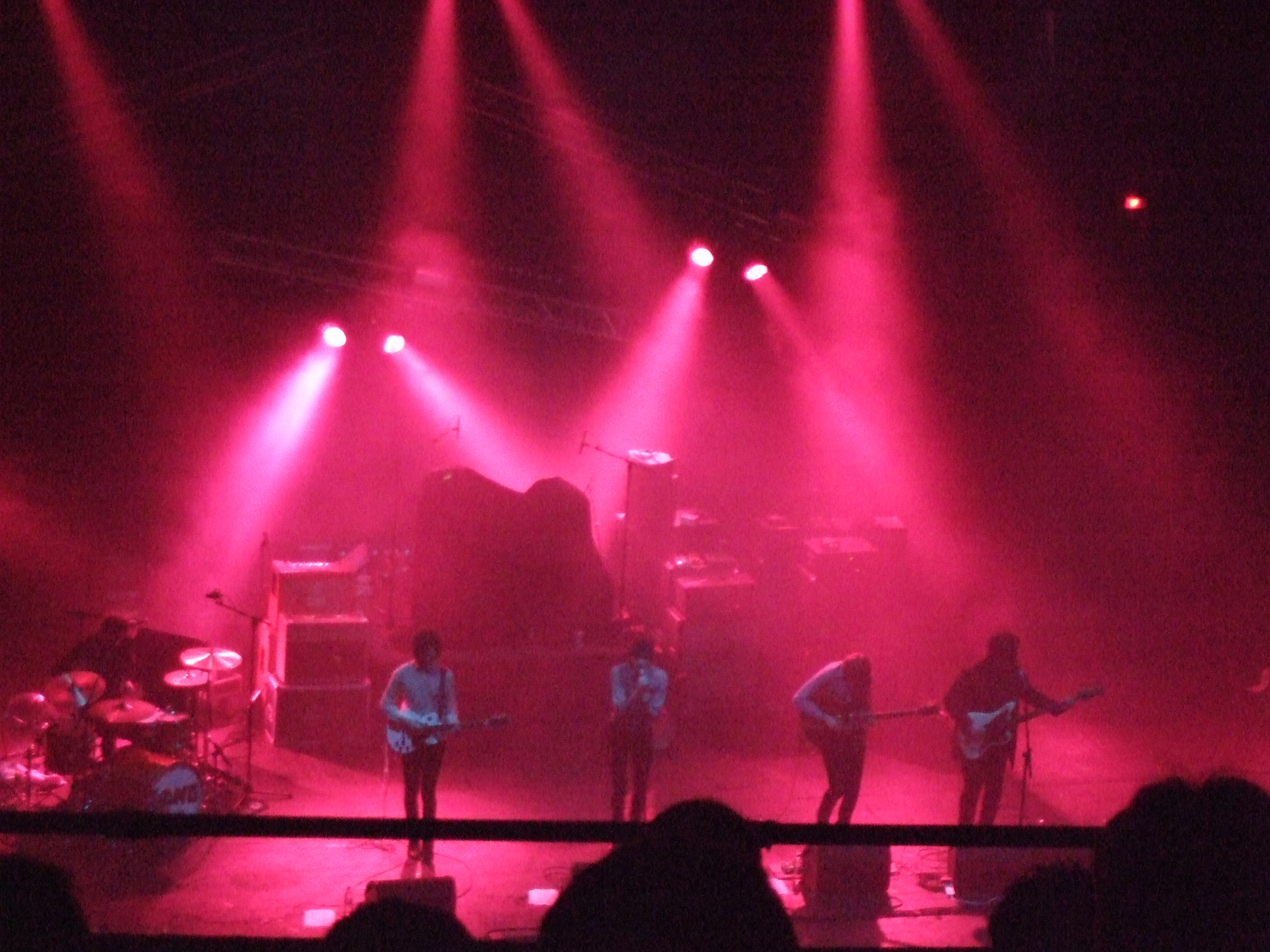
- Joe Lean & the Jing Jang Jong during the NME Awards Tour

Background information
- Origin: London, England
- Genres: Indie rock, post-punk revival
- Years active: 2007– 2010
- Labels: Vertigo, Mercury
- Members: Joe Lean – Vocals; Tommy D – Guitar; Dom O'Dare – Guitar; Panda – Bass/Vocals; James Craig – Drums
- Website: jingjangjong.com

Joe Lean & the Jing Jang Jong were an English indie rock band based in London. Although the band attracted considerable press attention following the 2007 release of their debut single "Lucio Starts Fires" they failed to capitalise on this, and disbanded in 2010. The band are perhaps best known for failing to ever release their critically acclaimed debut album.

== Overview ==
The original line-up included singer Joe Lean, guitarists Tommy D (Tom Dougall) and Dominic O'Dair, bassist Panda (Maxim Barron) and drummer James Craig. Lead singer Joe Lean also acts under the name Joe Van Moyland, and was drummer with The Pipettes until June 2007. He has played Jamie Chapman in Peep Show and Thomas Tallis in The Tudors.

The band formed in late 2006, initially calling themselves Joe Lean and The Tantrums. Following a career-destroying name change to Joe Lean and the Jing Jang Jong, they played their first gig in January 2007 and released their debut single "Lucio Starts Fires" on 8 October. In the same year, the band supported Babyshambles, Dizzee Rascal, Cansei de Ser Sexy and Kaiser Chiefs, and completed their first headlining tour across the UK in December. At the end of the year, the band were placed number 7 on the BBC's Sound of 2008 poll.

In 2008, Joe Lean and the Jing Jang Jong supported The Cribs on the 2008 NME Awards Tour, and showcased their sound at the SXSW festival in Austin, Texas. The band announced their biggest UK headlining tour to date, playing 25 gigs throughout April and May. Their second single, "Lonely Buoy", was released on 10 March 2008. They played at the Glastonbury Festival in June 2008, despite their name erroneously appearing as "Joe Ling and the Jing Jang Jong" on the line-up, and in August at Pukkelpop in Kiewit-Hasselt, Belgium.

Their debut self-titled album was originally due to be released on 4 August 2008; however, this release was scrapped 13 days before on 22 July 2008 as the album "didn't represent their current sound". Bizarrely, copies had already been sent to critics, with the NME giving it 8/10. Despite the album planning to be re-released in a re-recorded form in early 2009, this never materialised.

Guitarist Tommy D (Thomas Dougall), the brother of Rose Dougall, formerly of The Pipettes, left in late 2008 to take part in his sister's new project. Following this, new guitarist Randy Michael was enlisted. The band supported a reformed Blur at the O_{2} Academy Newcastle on 25 June 2009. In October 2009, they parted company with their record label. The band split up soon after in early 2010.

Maxim Barron, Dominic O'Dair and Tom Dougall formed a new band, a psychedelic/post-punk act called Toy. James Craig now plays in One Night Only, of which George Craig, James's brother, is also a member.

== Discography ==
=== Albums ===
Year	Title	Label	UK
2008	Joe Lean & The Jing Jang Jong	Mercury	unreleased

=== Singles ===
Year	Title	Album	Label	UK
2007	"Lucio Starts Fires" (Limited Vinyl Only)	non-album version	Young And Lost Club	-
2008	"Lonely Buoy"	Joe Lean & The Jing Jang Jong	Vertigo	43
2008	"Where Do You Go"	Joe Lean & The Jing Jang Jong	Vertigo	93
2008	"Lucio Starts Fires" (Re-release)	Joe Lean & The Jing Jang Jong	Vertigo	-
