= Fortysomething (TV series) =

- DVD cover
- Genre: Comedy drama
- Written by: Nigel Williams
- Starring: Hugh Laurie; Anna Chancellor; Benedict Cumberbatch
- Country of origin: United Kingdom
- Original language: English
- No. of series: 1
- No. of episodes: 6

Production
- Executive producer: Jonathan Powell
- Producer: Jo Willet
- Production company: Carlton Television

Original release
- Network: ITV
- Release: 29 June – 9 August 2003

Fortysomething is a 2003 British comedy-drama series set in Wimbledon, London. Hugh Laurie (who also directed the initial three episodes of the series) stars as Paul Slippery, a doctor facing a mid-life crisis. His wife Estelle (Anna Chancellor) is starting a new career as a headhunter. His three sons, Rory (Benedict Cumberbatch), a student at the fictitious University of Reigate, Daniel (Neil Henry) and Edwin (Joe Van Moyland), are sex-obsessed. Meanwhile, Paul appears to hear the inner thoughts of others.

Other important characters include Paul's colleague and nemesis, Dr. Ronnie Pilfrey (Peter Capaldi), and Estelle's new employer, Gwendolen Hartley (Sheila Hancock).

The series was written by Nigel Williams, based on his 1999 novel of the same name. The six episodes of the series were broadcast on ITV. Although a ratings failure on first transmission, leading to it being moved to an off-peak timeslot midway through the run, the participation of Laurie, Cumberbatch and Capaldi, all of whom went on to greater fame, has subsequently led the series to sell well on DVD.

== Cast and characters ==
Character	Actor/Actress
Paul Slippery	Hugh Laurie
Estelle Slippery	Anna Chancellor
Rory Slippery	Benedict Cumberbatch
Daniel Slippery	Neil Henry
Edwin Slippery	Joe Van Moyland
Gwendolen Hartley	Sheila Hancock
Laura Proek	Emma Ferguson
Lucy Proek	Siobhan Hewlett
Dr. Surinder Dhillon	Lolita Chakrabarti
Dr. Ronnie Pilfrey	Peter Capaldi

== Episodes ==
No.	Title	Directed by	Written by	Original release date
1	Episode 1	Hugh Laurie	Nigel Williams	29 June 2003
Paul wakes up one morning with the apparent ability to hear other people's thoughts. He is unable to remember certain things about his life, including when was the last time he had sex and his twentieth wedding anniversary. Rory is incensed that Daniel is trying to seduce his recently estranged girlfriend, Laura. Estelle discovers that her new job disappeared during a managerial restructuring of her company and leaves a vague message on Rory's phone that leads Paul to suspect that she is a lesbian. He tries to reclaim his wife while also dealing with the death of a patient and the delivery of several fridges for Edwin.
2	Episode 2	Hugh Laurie	Nigel Williams	6 July 2003
Paul resolves to have sex and plans to cook an erotic dinner for Estelle. Edwin again has a large shipment delivered to the house, this time of sex toys. Rory starts his new job at a homeless shelter where he recognizes an old fellow cast member who played Macbeth. Laura has moved in with Daniel just as his girlfriend, Lucy, returns from her trip to Thailand. Lucy, who is also Laura's sister, finds Laura at the house, wearing only Daniel's shirt. She calls their father and tells him. Dr Pilfrey finds Estelle at her new job in an attempt to woo her. Paul tries to avoid a medical examination of Mr Proek's (Laura and Lucy's father) bottom by pretending to be a Dutch doctor whenever Mr Proek calls. Stephen Fry appears as a fishmonger. Hugh Laurie gives a memorable version of a Dutch accent.
3	Episode 3	Hugh Laurie	Nigel Williams	13 July 2003
Laura and Lucy are now both sleeping at the Slippery house but not with Daniel. He still does not want to choose between them. Meanwhile, Rory realizes he has feelings for Lucy. Dr Pilfrey continues his fixation with Estelle and, as Estelle reveals to Paul, regularly e-mails her love letters. Edwin replies to one of the e-mails as Estelle and tells Dr Pilfrey that she is in love with him. Edwin arrives at the clinic in a suit for lunch with Paul and is mistaken by Dr Pilfrey as a National Health Service inspector.
4	Episode 4	Nic Phillips	Nigel Williams	20 July 2003
Edwin purchases a herbal aphrodisiac containing essence of "rudeberry" and convinces Rory, Daniel, Lucy, Laura, and their cousin, Woj, to pull a con on Paul. Paul pays Edwin for the whole bottle and laces Estelle's prawn sandwich with it. Laura reveals that she got a tattoo of Daniel's name on her bottom and has to go to Paul's clinic when it appears to have become infected. Laura reconsiders her relationship with Daniel, and meanwhile Rory and Edwin express their disapproval to Daniel for coercing her into getting the tattoo. In order to hear Estelle's speech at a women-only meeting, Paul dons a burqa and goes in disguise as "Yasmin".
5	Episode 5	Nic Phillips	Nigel Williams	27 July 2003
Paul accidentally attends an AA meeting. Thinking Estelle is having affairs with all of his oldest friends, Paul makes a play for fellow GP, Surinder. Estelle surprises Paul with a party where his friends believe they are staging an intervention. Lucy and Laura respectively break up with Rory and Daniel. Daniel's company makes a visit to Rory's homeless shelter. Hugh Laurie briefly plays the piano and sings.
6	Episode 6	Nic Phillips	Nigel Williams	9 August 2003
Rory and Daniel move out of the house and into their own flat. Distraught by their leaving and her relationship with Paul, Estelle moves in with her boss, Gwendolen. Hoping to find a way to get his wife back, Paul has Dr Pilfrey hypnotize him. Dr Pilfrey is jealous of Paul's ease with people so he hypnotizes Paul to cluck like a chicken whenever Paul gets in touch with someone. Edwin and Woj begin a sexual relationship. Laura reunites with Rory, and Lucy reunites with Daniel, returning to their original relationships from the beginning of the series. Joe Van Moyland briefly plays the guitar and sings.
