= Poppy Chancellor =

British artist (1987–2023)

Poppy Chancellor (4 June 1987 – 29 September 2023) was a British artist known for her work in papercutting. In 2016, she published Cut It Out!, a book on papercut art.

Chancellor also founded Griefcase, a bereavement support group, and co-launched the Dead Parent Club podcast.

== Early and personal life ==
She was born in West London, the daughter of actress Anna Chancellor and poet Jock Scot. She showed interest in art at a young age, a passion that her father encouraged. Chancellor studied illustration at Kingston University and furthered her education at the Royal Drawing School.

She married Jonny Mckenzie-Wynne in 2017.

== Death ==
Her personal life was marked by health challenges, including lupus and acute myeloid leukemia. Chancellor died on 29 September 2023 at the age of 36.
