= City Lights (The Waeve album) =

Studio album by the Waeve
- Released: 20 September 2024
- Length: 51:22
- Label: Transgressive
- Producer: James Ford

The Waeve chronology
The Waeve (2023)	City Lights (2024)	Eternal EP (2025)

Singles from City Lights
- 1. "City Lights" Released: 2 May 2024; 2. "You Saw" Released: 25 June 2024; 3. "Broken Boys" Released: 28 August 2024

City Lights is the second studio album by British duo the Waeve, consisting of Graham Coxon and Rose Elinor Dougall, released on 20 September 2024 by Transgressive Records. It was preceded by three singles.

== Release ==
The album's first single, its title track, was released on 2 May. The song, cowritten by the duo and produced by James Ford, includes vocals from both members as well as keyboards, guitar, bass guitar, drums, and Graham Coxon on saxophone. With the single, the duo released a statement saying "The city lights bestow a unique magic on everyone – the beautiful and the grotesque, the angels and the devils – shining and seductive, one and all... Who wants to love you and who wants to destroy you?"

The album was announced on 25 June, with its release date set for 20 September by Transgressive Records. With the announcement came the second single, "You Saw", which the duo called "a song about acknowledging how seemingly tiny decisions can have a seismic impact on the course of one's life, how sometimes it feels like the way things turn out are predestined. It's about reconciling a past version with the new version of one's self and being grateful for how things work out. It's built around a rhythmic string line to reflect the sense of propulsive forward motion."

The third single, "Broken Boys", was released on 28 August with a live performance video.

== Track listing ==
All tracks are written by Graham Coxon and Rose Elinor Dougall.

City Lights track listing
No.	Title	Length
1.	"City Lights"	4:20
2.	"You Saw"	5:25
3.	"Moth to the Flame"	4:43
4.	"I Belong To..."	4:23
5.	"Simple Days"	4:10
6.	"Broken Boys"	3:13
7.	"Song for Eliza May"	5:38
8.	"Druantia"	7:45
9.	"Girl of the Endless Night"	4:55
10.	"Sunrise"	6:50
Total length:		51:22

== Personnel ==
=== The Waeve ===
- Graham Coxon – vocals, guitar, bass guitar, drums, keyboard (1–8, 10), saxophone (1–3, 8–10), accordion (7)
- Rose Elinor Dougall – vocals, keyboard

=== Additional musicians ===
- James Ford – piano (5), synthesiser (10)
- Mike Smith – saxophone (2, 8)
- Chris Storr and Nichol Thomson – saxophone (8)
- Emma Smith, Jennymay Logan, Laura Moody, and Richard Jones – string section (2, 4, 7–10)
- Sam Becker – string section (4, 9)

=== Technical ===
- James Ford – producer, mixing engineer
- Animesh Raval – recording engineer
- Frank Arkwright – mastering engineer

== Charts ==
Chart performance for City Lights
Chart (2024)	Peak position
Scottish Albums (OCC)	26
UK Albums (OCC)	84
UK Independent Albums (OCC)	6
