= Rose Elinor Dougall =

British singer (born 1986)

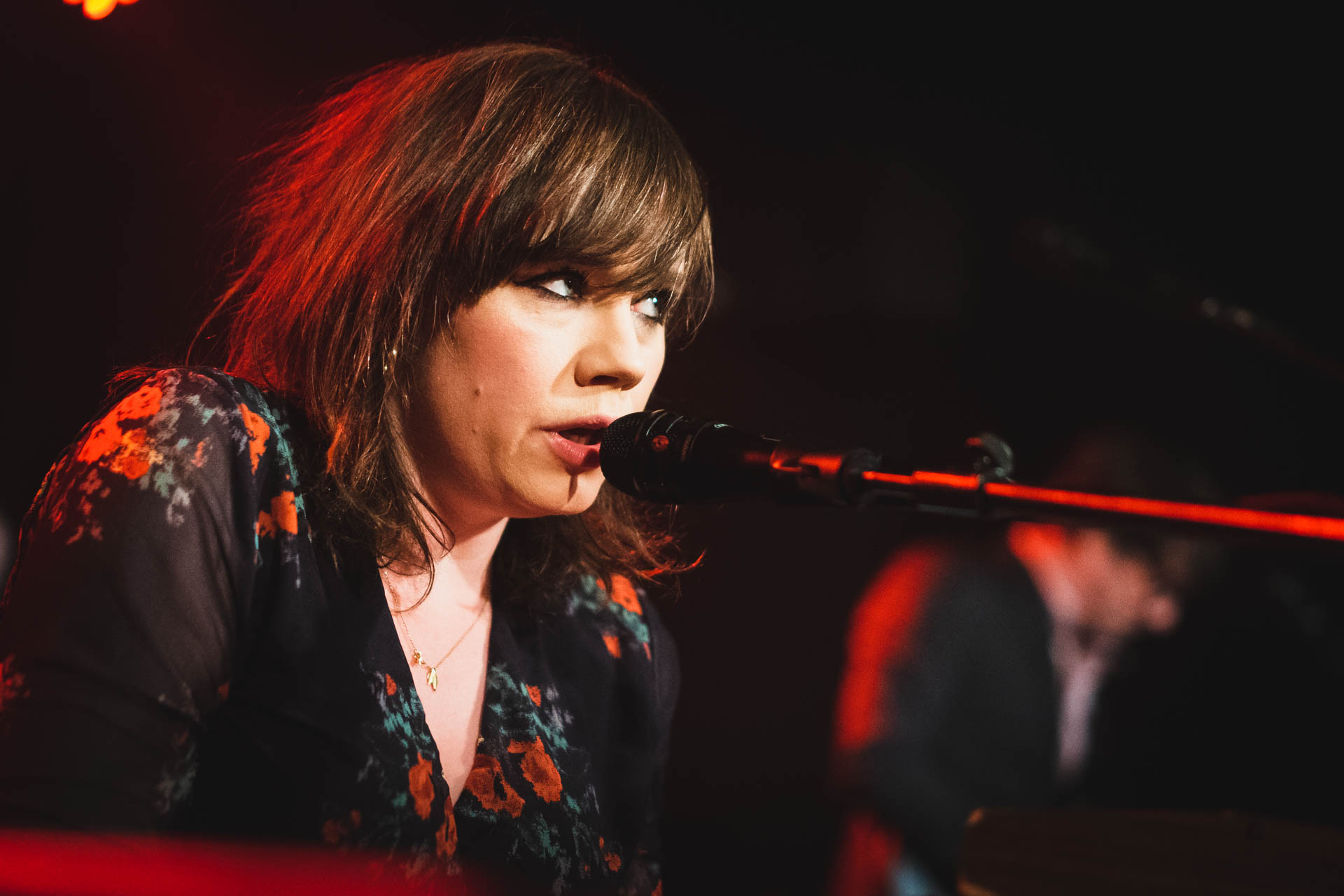
- Dougall performing in 2022

Background information
- Also known as: Rosay, Rose Pipette
- Born: 13 March 1986 (age 40)
- Origin: Brighton, England, UK
- Genre: Indie pop
- Years active: 2003–present
- Member of: The Waeve
- Formerly of: The Pipettes; Mark Ronson and the Business Intl.

Rose Elinor Dougall (born 13 March 1986) is an English singer, songwriter and instrumentalist. She was a member of the Pipettes and has performed with Mark Ronson. She also performs and records as a solo artist, and is currently a member of the musical duo and touring band The Waeve.

== Career ==
Dougall joined the Pipettes in 2003 after being introduced to the initial line-up by Monster Bobby at The Basketmakers pub in Brighton. With the Pipettes, Dougall took lead vocals on the singles "Judy" and "Dirty Mind". During her time with the Pipettes, she also provided guest vocals for The Young Playthings, Brakes and Dr Colossus. On 18 April 2008, it was announced in a blog post on the band's Myspace that Dougall and bandmate Rebecca Stephens had amicably left the band "to pursue other musical projects".

After her departure from the Pipettes, Dougall pursued a solo career. Her second single, "Start/Stop/Synchro" was reviewed in publications such as the NME, Pitchfork Media and The Guardian. Her third single, on digital download, was scheduled for release on 23 November 2009, the first to feature her live band The Distractions. A CD release of her singles to date "Singles 1,2,3" was released in Japan on 9 December 2009. Her first solo album, Without Why, was released on 30 August 2010.

Dougall was a vocalist and instrumentalist on Mark Ronson and the Business Intl's album Record Collection and co-wrote the last song on the album, "The Night Last Night". She appeared in a cameo on Ronson's video for "The Bike Song" and also with his band on Friday Night with Jonathan Ross. She has toured with Ronson, with her band also providing the support act.

Dougall appeared as a guest on BBC 6 Music's Roundtable on at least four occasions since September 2010.

In November 2016 she performed with the Royal Ballet at the Royal Opera House in a production of Wayne McGregor's Carbon Life.

In April 2022, she announced on social media a new collaboration with Graham Coxon under the name The Waeve.

== Personal life ==
Dougall was born in Hampstead in London, but raised in Brighton and attended Camberwell College of Arts as late as mid-2006, and as a student appeared uncredited on the BBC Two show James May's Top Toys in December 2005, drawing the presenter on an Etch A Sketch.

Her father, Alastair Dougall, is a singer-songwriter. She is the granddaughter of former BBC news broadcaster Robert Dougall. Her brother Thomas was a guitarist with Rose's backing band, was formerly of Joe Lean and the Jing Jang Jong and now plays in the psychedelic/kraut-rock group Toy.

She is in a relationship with her Waeve collaborator Graham Coxon, with whom she has a daughter.

== Discography ==
=== Solo Albums ===
- Without Why (2010)
- Stellular (2017)
- A New Illusion (2019)

=== EPs ===
- The Distractions EP (2012)
- Future Vanishes (November 2013)

=== Singles ===
- "Another Version of Pop Song" (December 2008)
- "Start/Stop/Synchro" (June 2009)
- "Fallen Over" (November 2009)
- "Find Me Out" (May 2010)
- "Stellular" (November 2016)
- "Space To Be" (April 2017)
- "First Sign" (January 2019)

=== With The Pipettes ===
- We Are the Pipettes (2006)

=== With Mark Ronson & The Business Intl ===
- Record Collection (2010)

=== With The Waeve ===
- The Waeve (2023)
- City Lights (2024)
