= Tresor (album) =

Studio album by Gwenno
- Released: 1 July 2022
- Studio: Gwenno's home studio, Cardiff
- Genre: Psychedelic pop, baroque pop
- Length: 43:06
- Language: Cornish; Welsh
- Label: Heavenly
- Producer: Rhys Edwards, Gwenno Saunders

Gwenno chronology
Le Kov (2018)	Tresor (2022)	Utopia (2025)

Singles from Tresor
- 1. "An Stevel Nowydh" Released: 28 February 2022; 2. "Men An Toll" Released: 7 April 2022; 3. "Tresor" Released: 11 May 2022; 4. "Anima" Released: 14 June 2022; 5. "N.Y.C.A.W." Released: 4 July 2022

Tresor (a Cornish word for "treasure") is the third solo studio album by Welsh singer Gwenno, released on 1 July 2022 by Heavenly Recordings. Like Gwenno's previous work, this album's lyrics are almost entirely in Cornish with one song, "N.Y.C.A.W." (which stands for "Nid yw Cymru ar Werth", meaning "Wales is not for Sale"), in Welsh. The album was shortlisted for the 2022 Mercury Prize.

== Singles and film ==
Lead single "An Stevel Nowydh" was released 28 February 2022, followed by "Men An Toll" on 7 April, "Tresor" on 11 May, "Anima" on 14 June, and "N.Y.C.A.W." on 4 July.

Each single came with a music video which are part of a longer film created by Gwenno in collaboration with Anglesey-born filmmaker Clare Marie Bailey, set for release some time in the summer of 2022. The film was shot on Super 8 in Bryn Celli Ddu, Mynydd Parys, and Porth Ia (St Ives) during Summer 2021, was edited by Joan Pope, and stars Eddie Ladd as Greddf (a Welsh word meaning "instinct").

== Style and reception ==
Tresor ratings
Aggregate scores
Source	Rating
AnyDecentMusic?	7.9/10
Metacritic	84/100
Review scores
Source	Rating
AllMusic	4/5 stars
Clash	7/10
The Guardian	4/5 stars
The Irish Times	4/5 stars
The Line of Best Fit	8/10
MusicOMH	4.5/5 stars
Pitchfork	7.3/10
The Skinny	4/5 stars
Uncut	4.5/5 stars

AllMusic's Tim Sendra called the album "a slight change of pace, scaling back the arrangements and focusing her songwriting to a fine point", replacing her previous releases' "gossamer-light, dream-like", and "joyful" sound with "a dark cloud partially eclipsing the brightness as Gwenno sings with real emotion about the struggles of motherhood and its place in the larger culture." The album's "more direct vocal approach", "the quiet, clipped nature of the drums, the ghostly electronic haze that floats around in the background, and the unhurried tempos make Tresor a more human-sized album that takes a little sitting with to fully appreciate", but ultimately the album "goes one step further to cementing [Gwenno] in the experimental pop firmament." Clash's Sam Walker-Smart says "Except for two electronic led numbers that become more of a slog than a celebration, Gwenno has once again married the otherworldly with the primal with supreme effect."

The Guardian's Neil Spencer calls the album's lyrics "occasionally confrontational" but "predominantly introspective and allusive, drawing on nature ("Kan Me" celebrates the May hawthorn) and on Gwenno's recent entrance into motherhood" and an "ambitious album ... from a unique artist." The Irish Times' Éamon Sweeney notes Gwenno exploring "the impact of motherhood on her psyche", "technological alienation on "Y Dydd Olaf", and "meditations on home and identity on Le Kov (The Place of Memory)" with a "blending of pastoral folk with adventurous ambient electronica" making for a "delightful", "innovative album that isn't afraid to address big ideas through the medium of a marginalised Celtic language."

=== Year-end lists ===
Tresor year-end lists
Publication	#	Ref.
BBC Radio 6 Music	10	
Far Out	44	
Mojo	28	
Loud and Quiet	25	
Uncut	18	
Under the Radar	73	

== Track listing ==
All tracks are written by Gwenno Saunders; "An Stevel Nowydh" and "N.Y.C.A.W." written by Saunders and Rhys Edwards.

Tresor track listing
No.	Title	Length
1.	"An Stevel Nowydh"	4:48
2.	"Anima"	3:18
3.	"Tresor"	4:09
4.	"N.Y.C.A.W."	4:31
5.	"Men an Toll"	1:33
6.	"Ardamm"	7:21
7.	"Kan Me"	4:09
8.	"Keltek"	3:36
9.	"Tonnow"	5:56
10.	"Porth Ia"	3:45
Total length:		43:06

== Personnel ==
- Gwenno Saunders – vocals (all tracks), production (tracks 5, 7, 8)
- Rhys Edwards – mixing, bass guitar, drums, guitar, piano, sounds, strings, vibraphone; production (1–4, 6, 7, 9, 10)
- Matt Colton – mastering
- H. Hawkline – design, layout
- Clare Marie Bailey – photography

== Charts ==
Chart performance for Tresor
Chart (2022)	Peak position
Scottish Albums (OCC)	49
UK Album Downloads (OCC)	21
UK Independent Albums (OCC)	6
