= Earth vs. The Pipettes =

Studio album by The Pipettes
- Released: 6 September 2010 (UK); 13 September 2010 (US); 16 November 2010 (US digital download)
- Genres: Indie pop; disco; synth-pop
- Length: 37:48
- Label: Fortuna Pop!

The Pipettes chronology
| We Are the Pipettes (2006) | Earth vs. The Pipettes (2010) |

Singles from Earth vs. The Pipettes
- 1. "Our Love Was Saved by Spacemen" Released: February 2010; 2. "Stop the Music" Released: 19 April 2010

Earth vs. The Pipettes is the second and final studio album by the British girl group the Pipettes, and their only album as a duo. "Our Love was Saved by Spacemen" was released as a viral video. "Stop the Music," their official first single from the album, was released on 19 April 2010. Its music video was released on 23 March.

== Reception ==
Professional ratings
Aggregate scores
| Source | Rating |
|---|---|
| Metacritic | 54/100 |
Review scores
| Source | Rating |
| AllMusic | 4/5 stars |
| The A.V. Club | B |
| Filter | 60% |
| NME | 2/5 stars |
| Paste | 6.4/10 |
| Pitchfork | 3.2/10 |
| PopMatters | 6/10 |
| Rolling Stone | 3/5 stars |
| Slant Magazine | 2.5/5 stars |
| Spin | 2.5/5 stars |

Earth vs. The Pipettes was met with "mixed or average" reviews from critics. At Metacritic, which assigns a weighted average rating out of 100 to reviews from mainstream publications, this release received an average score of 54 based on 12 reviews.

In a review for AllMusic, critic reviewer Tim Sendra wrote: "Though almost nothing on the record will appeal to the people who liked their earlier work because of the girl group connection, fans of cotton-candied pop sung by girls who sound like they live on a diet of helium and gummy bears will find Earth vs. the Pipettes just about perfect." Erin Hall of Filter said: "Earth vs. The Pipettes has none of the punch of the group's first outing. In place of the sassy, empowered lyrics of We Are The Pipettes, we get cloying, clingy tales of pining sung over redundant disco beats." At Slant Magazine, Jonathan Keefe explained that "there’s simply nothing about Earth vs. the Pipettes that's distinctive or in any way better than what other '80s revivalists have already done."

== Track listing ==
All tracks are written by the Pipettes (Gwenno & Ani Saunders).

| No. | Title | Length |
|---|---|---|
| 1. | "Call Me" | 2:50 |
| 2. | "Ain't No Talking" | 2:32 |
| 3. | "Thank You" | 3:25 |
| 4. | "I Need a Little Time" | 3:40 |
| 5. | "History" | 2:21 |
| 6. | "I Always Planned to Stay" | 3:28 |
| 7. | "Stop the Music" | 4:07 |
| 8. | "I Vibe U" | 3:41 |
| 9. | "Our Love Was Saved by Spacemen" | 3:05 |
| 10. | "Finding My Way" | 2:39 |
| 11. | "Captain Rhythm" | 2:30 |
| 12. | "From Today" | 3:35 |
| Total length: | | 37:48 |

iTunes bonus tracks
| No. | Title | Length |
|---|---|---|
| 13. | "Stop the Music (Martin Rushent Remix)" | 3:48 |
| 14. | "Call Me (Young Galaxy Remix)" | 3:00 |
| Total length: | | 44:36 |
