= We Are the Pipettes =

Studio album by the Pipettes
- Released: 17 July 2006
- Studio: Fortress Studios
- Genre: Indie pop
- Length: 33:24; 38:59 (American/Asian version)
- Label: Memphis Industries (EU); Cherrytree Records (Asia/America)
- Producer: Gareth Parton and Andy Dragazis

The Pipettes chronology
We Are the Pipettes (2006)	Earth vs. Pipettes (2010)

Singles from We Are the Pipettes
- 1. "Dirty Mind" Released: 14 November 2005; 2. "Your Kisses Are Wasted on Me" Released: 27 March 2006; 3. "Pull Shapes" Released: 3 July 2006; 4. "Judy" Released: 25 September 2006

Professional ratings
Review scores
Source	Rating
AllMusic	4/5 stars
Billboard	(favorable)
Drowned in Sound	(7/10)
The Guardian	4/5 stars
Pitchfork	(8.4/10)
Rolling Stone	3.5/5 stars
Stylus	B−
This Is Fake DIY	4/5 stars

We Are the Pipettes is the debut album from the Pipettes and is named after the group's theme song. It was released on 17 July 2006 by Memphis Industries on CD, vinyl and digital download. The song "We Are the Pipettes" was featured in "Everything Changes", the first episode of the TV series Torchwood.

In 2007 the entire album was remixed by Greg Wells as part of their United States record deal with Cherrytree Records, and features two new tracks that are not included on the original release: "Dance and Boogie" and "Baby, Just Be Yourself". It was released, with a new album cover (inspired by Attack of the 50 Foot Woman), on 2 October in North America and 17 October in Asia.

The album did not include any liner notes, except in the Japanese version which included the lyrics in English and Japanese.

== Formats and track listings ==
UK

1. "We Are the Pipettes" – 2:48
2. "Pull Shapes" – 2:58
3. "Why Did You Stay?" – 1:43
4. "Dirty Mind" – 2:43
5. "It Hurts to See You Dance So Well" – 1:53
6. "Judy" – 2:47
7. "A Winter's Sky" – 3:03
8. "Your Kisses Are Wasted on Me" – 2:11
9. "Tell Me What You Want" – 2:32
10. "Because It's Not Love (But It's Still a Feeling)" – 2:37
11. "Sex" – 2:38
12. "One Night Stand" – 1:40
13. "ABC" – 2:07
14. "I Love You" – 1:37
  International bonus track
15. "Really That Bad" – 02:04

USA

All songs remixed by Greg Wells

1. "We Are the Pipettes" – 2:48
2. "Pull Shapes" – 2:58
3. "Why Did You Stay?" – 1:43
4. "Dirty Mind" – 2:43
5. "It Hurts to See You Dance So Well" – 2:09
6. "Judy" – 2:47
7. "A Winter's Sky" – 3:03
8. "Your Kisses Are Wasted on Me" – 2:11
9. "Tell Me What You Want" – 2:32
10. "Because It's Not Love (But It's Still a Feeling)" – 2:37
11. "Sex" – 2:38
12. "One Night Stand" – 1:40
13. "ABC" – 2:07
14. "I Love You" – 1:37
15. "Dance and Boogie" – 2:11
16. "Baby, Just Be Yourself" – 3:00

Bonus CD available with some US copies:

1. "Magician Man" – 4:20
2. "Pull Shapes" video

== Charts ==
Chart (2007)	Peak position
US Top Heat Seekers Charts	18
