= The Pipettes =

British pop band (2003–2011)

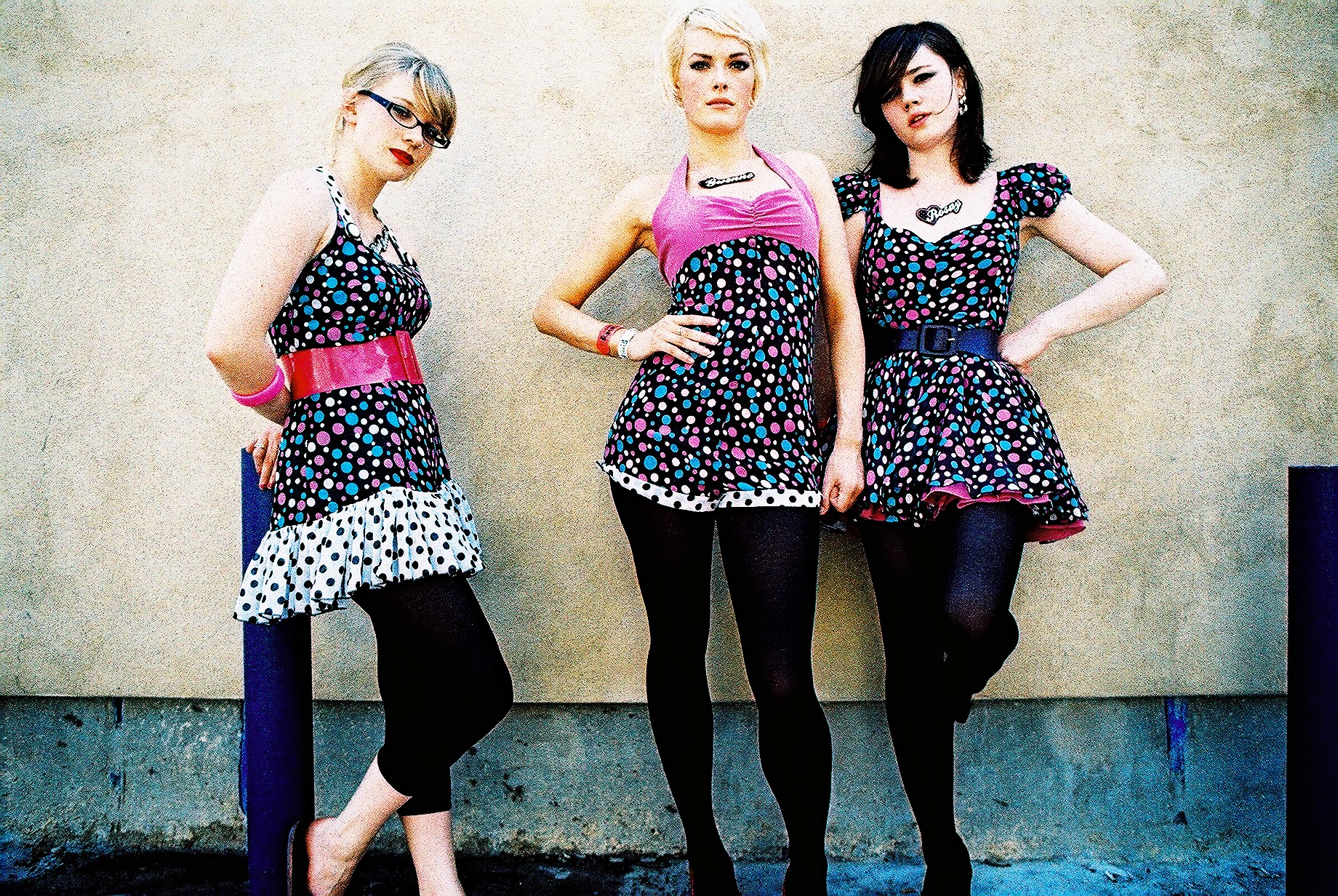
- The Pipettes at South by Southwest, 2007. From left: RiotBecki, Gwenno and Rosay

Background information
- Origin: Brighton, England
- Genres: Indie pop; doo-wop
- Years active: 2003–2011
- Labels: Memphis; Cherrytree; Fortuna Pop!
- Past members: Ani Glass; Gwenno; Monster Bobby; Jon Falcone; Seb Falcone; Alex White; Julia Clark-Lowes; Marc Beatty; Brill Rheounce; Robin of Loxley; RiotBecki; Rosay; Jason Adelinia; Anna McDonald; Beth Mburu-Bowie
- Website: www.thepipettes.co.uk

The Pipettes /pɪˈpɛts/ were a British indie pop girl group formed in 2003 in Brighton by Robert "Monster Bobby" Barry. The group has released two albums, We Are the Pipettes, and Earth vs. The Pipettes and released numerous singles to support it; the most successful being "Pull Shapes" which peaked at No. 26 in the UK Singles Chart. The group was active from 2003 to 2011.

The group was originally composed of Julia Clarke-Lowes, Rose Elinor Dougall and RiotBecki. At the time of their debut album Clarke-Lowes had been replaced by Gwenno. In 2008, Dougall and Stephens also left the group. By 2010, the line-up consisted of Gwenno and her sister Ani. Their album Earth vs. The Pipettes was released on 6 October 2010 in the UK.

The female members were backed by an all-male band, the Cassettes, which included Bobby, brothers Jon and Seb Falcone, and Alex White.

== Overview ==
=== Formation and We Are the Pipettes (2003–2007) ===
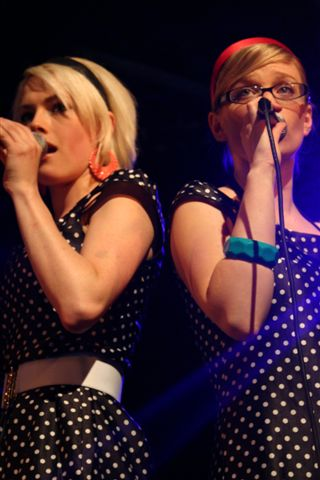
Gwenno (left) and RiotBecki in 2006

The Pipettes were formed in mid-2003 by singer-songwriter and promoter Monster Bobby with the intention of reviving the Phil Spector pop sound and giving it a modern twist, after noticing the reaction girl group songs got during his DJ sets. In collaboration with singer, poet, and photographer Julia Clark-Lowes, who was inspired by Bill Drummond and Jimmy Cauty's The Manual, he recruited friends from and around the local music scene. The Pipettes, as they were to become, were all first introduced to each other by Bobby at The Basketmakers Arms in Brighton.

Regarding the formation of the band, Rose Elinor Dougall said in an interview: "Well, basically our guitarist, Bobby, had a contact with someone, and he kind of recruited us all individually. We all kind of knew each other, but not as a group. He asked us if we wanted to be involved and we said yes went for a drink and that was it. I think we had a few songs, he had a few songs, and we had ideas and gradually it evolved to what it is now because we all write songs, but it was Bobby who kind of started it off."

The group have been described as “an experiment” in reviving the late-1950/early-1960s girl group pop aesthetic, though members of the band emphasized that they were not a “manufactured” studio creation. Their name, which is a reference to a laboratory instrument, is a nod to the experimental origins of the group, and also an allusion to similarly named groups (the Ronettes, the Bobbettes, etc.) and the Pips. The male backing musicians, the Cassettes, never appear in interviews or photo shoots, emphasizing the role of the singers. The three frontwomen wear polka dot dresses with synchronized choreography being a major part of their live shows, whereas the Cassettes can be seeing wearing knitted tank tops with their initials sewn onto them. All songs are credited to the Pipettes as a whole. Generally one member has a concept and basic outline for a song, on which the other members subsequently have an input as to arrangement or lyric changes. As a result, all members share credit on their original songs.

The line-up consisting of Dougall ("Rosay"), Julia ("The Duchess (of Darkness)" or "Julia Caesar"), Rebecca Stephens ("RiotBecki"), Jon, Seb, Joe ("Robin of Loxley") and Bobby settled in mid-2004, after earlier line-ups included members of the Electric Soft Parade and Marc Beatty of Brakes. In April 2005 founding member Julia left to concentrate on her own project, the Indelicates, and was replaced by Welsh-language solo artist Gwenno. Three limited edition singles were released in 2005, leading to the group being signed to Memphis Industries shortly after touring with the label's The Go! Team. Debut album We Are the Pipettes was released in the United Kingdom on 17 July 2006 and reached No. 41 in the UK Album Chart. The album was produced by Gareth Parton and Andy Dragazis (of Blue States).

In 2007, the band signed with Cherrytree Records, part of Interscope, to release their material in America, Asia and Australasia. After a series of well-received performances at the SXSW festival, an EP led by the track "Your Kisses Are Wasted on Me" was released on 5 June, peaking at No. 5 on the Billboard Hot 100 Singles Sales chart. The album was released in North America on 2 October, where it reached No. 18 on Billboard's Top Heatseekers chart, and in Asia on 17 October, with both releases containing new bonus tracks. Both of these versions of the album were remixed and produced by Greg Wells, thus resulting in a differing sound from the original European release.

In June 2007, original drummer Joe left to concentrate on his own band Joe Lean & The Jing Jang Jong and was replaced by Jason Adelinia, formerly of Teasing Lulu and This City.

=== Lineup changes, second album and breakup (2008–2011) ===
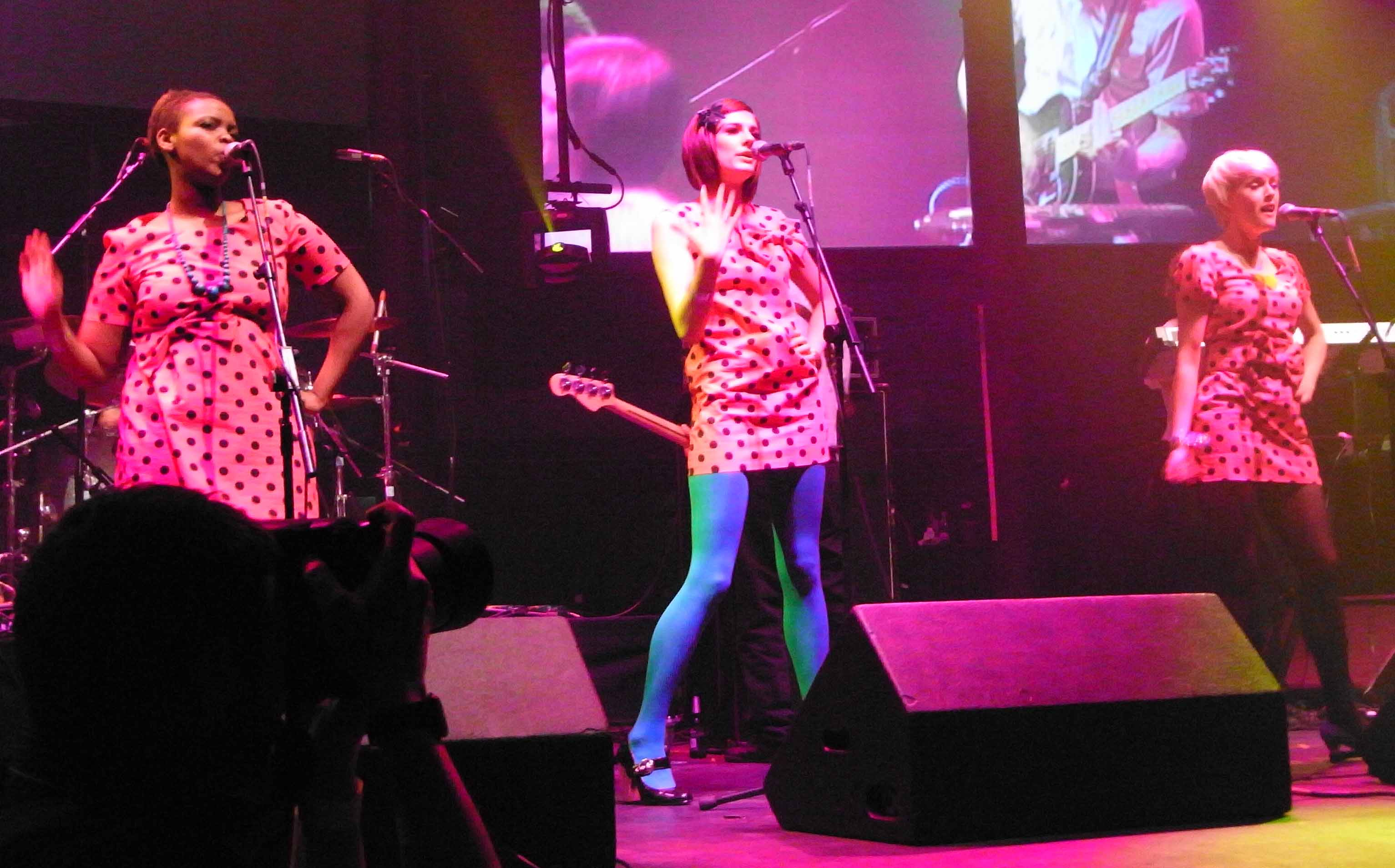
Ani Glass, Gwenno and Beth Mburu-Bowie performing at Turning Point Roundhouse, 2009.

On 18 April 2008, the group broke up although it was announced on the band's official website and in a blog post on their MySpace that RiotBecki and Rosay had left "to pursue other musical projects", and had been replaced by Ani, who is Gwenno's younger sister, and Anna McDonald. This means that none of the original female members remain. Jason Adelinia also left the band and was replaced by Alex White from The Electric Soft Parade and Brakes. Adelinia started playing drums for The Ghost Frequency and now plays for Los Campesinos!.

The new line-up made its live début on 3 May when they joined Mark Ronson on stage at the Corsa Presents Bandstand event in Old Billingsgate Market, London. They played their first full show in support of REO Speedwagon on 10 June at the indigO_{2}. On 16 July they appeared at the premiere of Angus, Thongs and Perfect Snogging, following the inclusion of "Pull Shapes" on the movie's soundtrack. On consecutive nights from 1st until 3 September they played a series of promotional gigs at The Barfly in London.

On 12 November, it was announced that Anna McDonald had left the Pipettes to pursue songwriting opportunities away from the band. On 11 February 2009, Beth Mburu-Bowie was announced as McDonald's replacement. This line-up made its live début on 5 March 2009 at the launch party of the British Music Experience. Beth toured and recorded the second album until late 2009 when she and the Pipettes parted ways. Her vocals were replaced on all recorded material. Earth vs. The Pipettes was produced by Martin Rushent and recorded at The Dutch House Studios at his home in Berkshire.

On 12 February, a new track "Our Love Was Saved by Spacemen" and an accompanying video were made available via the Pipettes official website. It generally got positive reviews from websites such as PopJustice and PopMatters.

"Stop the Music" was premiered on BBC Wales, in November 2009, and was song of the day on PopJustice on 23 February 2010, followed by an excellent review. The music video was released on 23 March 2010, and the song was released on 19 April 2010.

The group's second album, Earth vs. The Pipettes was released on 6 September 2010, followed by singles "Call Me" and non-album track "Boo Shuffle", a posthumous tribute to producer Martin Rushent. After the second album was a commercial flop, they disbanded in 2011.

== Discography ==
=== Albums ===
Year	Album	Chart positions
Year	Album	UK
2006	We Are the Pipettes	41
2010	Earth vs. The Pipettes	–

=== Singles ===
Year	Song	Chart positions	Album
Year	Song	UK	Album
2004	"Pipettes Christmas Single" *	—	non-album single
2005	"I Like a Boy in Uniform (School Uniform)"	—	non-album single
2005	"ABC"	—	non-album single
2005	"Judy"	—	non-album single
2005	"Dirty Mind"	63	We Are the Pipettes
2006	"Your Kisses Are Wasted on Me"	35	We Are the Pipettes
2006	"Pull Shapes"	26	We Are the Pipettes
2006	"Judy" (re-recording)	46	We Are the Pipettes
2010	"Our Love Was Saved by Spacemen"	–	Earth vs. Pipettes
2010	"Stop the Music"	-	Earth vs. Pipettes
2010	"Call Me"	-	Earth vs. Pipettes
2011	"Boo Shuffle"	–	non-album single

=== EPs ===
- 2006 – Meet the Pipettes
- 2007 – Your Kisses Are Wasted on Me
