= Monster Bobby =

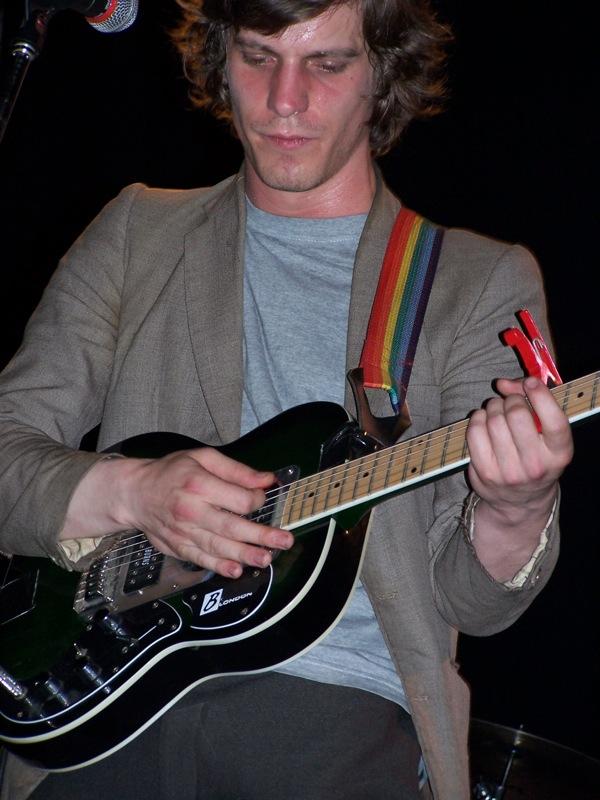
- Monster Bobby (performing with The Pipettes, 2007)

Background information
- Origin: Brighton, England
- Genres: Indie pop
- Years active: 2003–present (with The Pipettes); 2006–present (solo)
- Label: Hypnote Recording Concern
- Website: Official MySpace

Monster Bobby (born Robert William Barry, 1981) is an English singer-songwriter, best known as the creator of and guitarist for the indie pop girl group The Pipettes.

== Overview ==
In 2001, Barry starred in Weirdsister College, the spin-off series of The Worst Witch, in which he played the Nick Hobbes. Prior to that he starred in the film New Year's Day as Stephen, written by Ralph Brown and directed by Suri Krushnamma and released in 2001.

Monster Bobby is most well known as being guitarist for The Cassette(s), The Pipettes' all-male backing band. He is frequently credited by The Pipettes both with developing the idea of a modern girl group, and with introducing the members of The Pipettes to one another. He has been described as the group's "Svengali", but rejects any notion of "individual genius" in his role with The Pipettes, stating that "most of the most interesting music is made in such a collective fashion that it is very hard to assign individual responsibility".

Monster Bobby's solo work is a conceptual mix of electronic samples, offbeat songwriting and avant-garde intellectual influences, significantly different from the upbeat girl group pop of The Pipettes. To date, many of Monster Bobby's recordings have appeared as limited edition singles and on compilations, though his debut album, "Gaps" released in 2007, was made up of original material and was widely available.

Since the late 1990s, Monster Bobby has run an irregular series of club nights, concerts, events and a fanzine called Totally Bored or "TB". It was in this milieu back in Brighton that the idea for the Pipettes was eventually conceived. Totally Bored eventually grew into a zine and a radio show.

Monster Bobby claims his music to be as affected by Freud, Stockhausen and Derrida as it is by The Human League, The Archies and S'Express.

Monster Bobby also wrote a blog at thebombparty and frequent online and printed articles principally on music and film in amongst others "the Quietus" "Electric Sheep" "the Wire" and "Frieze". He is also the author of Music of the Future, which was published by Repeater Books in 2017.

He started the "Little Orchestra" to play original contemporary classical music and contemporary classics such as "Terry Riley's" "In C".

== Filmography ==
New Year's Day (2000)

=== Television ===
Year	Title	Role	Notes
2001	Weirdsister College	Nicholas "Nick" Hobbes	Series 1 (13 episodes)

== Discography ==
=== Albums ===
Year	Album
2007	Gaps

=== Singles ===
Year	Title
2006	"Even Monsters Can Be People"
2006	"Heaven Hides Nothing"
2008	"I am a Pedestrian"
