= Rebecca Stephens (singer) =

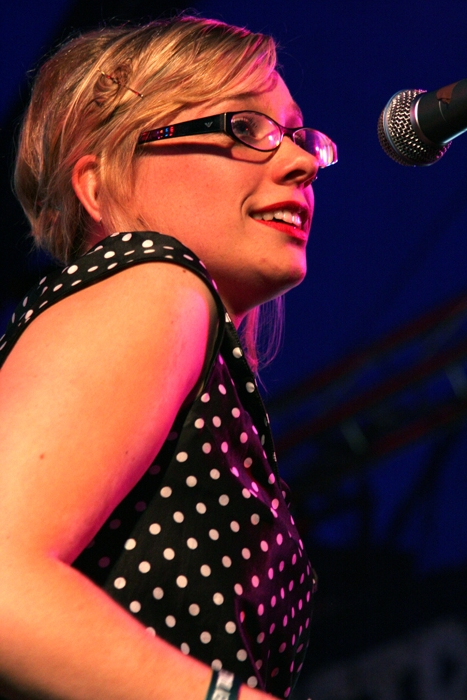
- Rebecca Stephens in 2006

Background information
- Also known as: RiotBecki
- Born: Rebecca Louise Stephens; 30 August 1982 (age 43); Brighton, England
- Genres: Indie pop
- Years active: 2003–present

Rebecca Stephens (born 30 July 1982) is a singer, formerly with British band The Pipettes, where she was commonly known as RiotBecki.

== The Pipettes ==
Brighton-born Stephens normally stood stage left with The Pipettes. She is a self-described feminist and has a degree in media studies and film and video production from Buckinghamshire Chilterns University College having written her dissertation on early Seventies hardcore pornography.

She sang the verses of the single "Your Kisses Are Wasted on Me" and lead on album tracks "Tell Me What You Want" and "One Night Stand", which (along with "Feminist Complaints" and album track "A Winter's Sky") she also wrote. In April 2005, she contributed vocals to the hip-hop album Flowers & Trees by fellow Brightonian Y.Misdaq aka Yoshi, and has also provided vocals for The Blind Cowboys, a project by bandmate Jon Cassette and Thomas White of The Electric Soft Parade and Brakes on their cover of "Sometimes Always".

== Solo work ==
On 10 October 2008, Stephens announced in a MySpace blog that she had just returned from a trip to Atlanta, Georgia where she had recorded a number of demos with Randy Michael of Atlanta band The Booze under the name Electric Blue, after the pornographic film of the same name. Four of the demos were posted on Electric Blue's MySpace.

== Projectionists ==
In June 2010, it was announced on MySpace that Stephens had formed a new band, Projectionists, with Pete Marshall, Christian Madden, Sam Morris and Paul Mortlock, that they had completed their first EP, and would be playing various venues during the remainder of the year. Three songs were posted on MySpace.

== Jesca Hoop ==
She regularly appears as a backing singer to Jesca Hoop and appeared in Hoop's appearance on Marc Riley's All Shock Up pilot series for the BBC.
