= List of awards and nominations received by Anthony Mackie =

Anthony Mackie awards and nominations
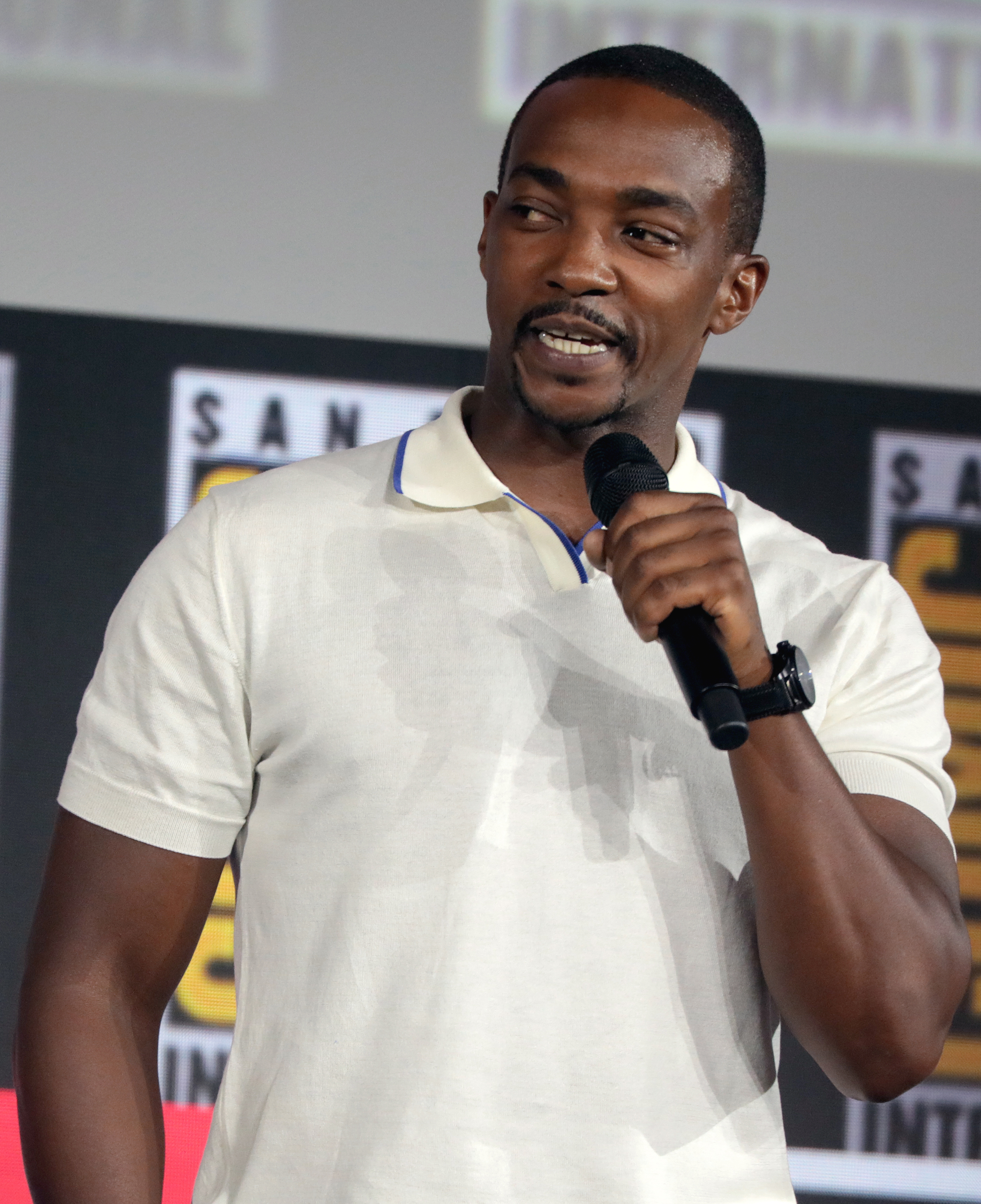
- Mackie at the San Diego Comic-Con in 2019
Awards and nominations
Award	Wins	Nominations
Emmy Awards	0	2
Screen Actors Guild Awards	0	1

Totals (Note: Certain award groups do not simply award one winner. They acknowledge several different recipients, have runners-up, and have third place. Since this is a specific recognition and is different from losing an award, runner-up mentions are considered wins in this award tally. For simplification and to avoid errors, each award in this list has been presumed to have had a prior nomination.)
- Wins: 9
- Nominations: 40

Anthony Mackie is an American actor who has received numerous accolades, including nominations for two Emmy Awards and a Screen Actors Guild Award. Overall, he has received 9 awards from 40 nominations.

Mackie began his career on stage, winning an Obie Award as part of the ensemble cast of Talk (2002). He earned his first film accolades for headlining the LGBT drama Brother to Brother (2004), receiving nominations for the Gotham Award and the Independent Spirit Award for Best Breakthrough Performance. He garnered widespread acclaim for co-starring in the war film The Hurt Locker (2008), winning the Black Reel Award for Outstanding Supporting Actor alongside nominations for the Independent Spirit Award for Best Supporting Male and the Screen Actors Guild Award for Outstanding Performance by a Cast in a Motion Picture. He won the Black Reel Award for Outstanding Actor for the drama film Night Catches Us (2010).

Mackie gained wide recognition for portraying Sam Wilson / Falcon / Captain America in the Marvel Cinematic Universe (MCU), beginning with the 2014 film Captain America: The Winter Soldier. Across the franchise, he has received two MTV Movie Awards and nominations for two Critics' Choice Super Awards and two Saturn Awards. Expanding into television hosting, he received a nomination for the Daytime Emmy Award for Outstanding Lifestyle/Culinary Show Host for hosting the reality series Shark Beach with Anthony Mackie: Gulf Coast (2024). For portraying a fictionalized version of himself in the comedy series The Studio (2025), he was nominated for the Primetime Emmy Award for Outstanding Guest Actor in a Comedy Series.

== Awards and nominations ==
Awards and nominations received by Anthony Mackie
Award	Year (Note: Indicates the year of ceremony. Each year is linked to the article about the awards held that year, wherever possible.)	Category	Nominated work	Result	Ref(s)
African-American Film Critics Association Awards	2009	Best Supporting Actor	The Hurt Locker	Won	
Alliance of Women Film Journalists Awards	2009	Best Ensemble (shared with cast)	The Hurt Locker	Won	
BET Awards	2024	Best Actor	—N/a	Nominated	
Black Reel Awards	2005	Outstanding Breakthrough Performance	She Hate Me	Nominated	
Black Reel Awards	2006	Outstanding Television Actor	Sucker Free City	Nominated	
Black Reel Awards	2010	Outstanding Supporting Actor	The Hurt Locker	Won	
Black Reel Awards	2011	Outstanding Actor	Night Catches Us	Won	
Black Reel Awards	2012	Outstanding Supporting Actor	The Adjustment Bureau	Nominated	
Black Reel Awards	2021	Outstanding Actor in a Drama Series	The Falcon and the Winter Soldier	Nominated	
Black Reel Awards	2024	Outstanding Actor in a Comedy Series	Twisted Metal	Nominated	
Critics' Choice Super Awards	2021	Best Actor in a Science Fiction/Fantasy Movie	Synchronic	Nominated	
Critics' Choice Super Awards	2022	Best Actor in a Superhero Series	The Falcon and the Winter Soldier	Nominated	
Critics' Choice Super Awards	2025	Best Actor in a Superhero Movie	Captain America: Brave New World	Nominated	
Daytime Emmy Awards	2025	Outstanding Lifestyle/Culinary Show Host	Shark Beach with Anthony Mackie: Gulf Coast	Nominated	
Gotham Awards	2004	Breakthrough Performance	Brother to Brother	Nominated	
Gotham Awards	2009	Best Ensemble (shared with cast)	The Hurt Locker	Won	
Independent Spirit Awards	2005	Best Breakthrough Performance	Brother to Brother	Nominated	
Independent Spirit Awards	2009	Best Supporting Male	The Hurt Locker	Nominated	
MTV Movie & TV Awards	2016	Best Ensemble (shared with cast)	Avengers: Age of Ultron	Nominated	
MTV Movie & TV Awards	2021	Best Duo (shared with Sebastian Stan)	The Falcon and the Winter Soldier	Won	
MTV Movie & TV Awards	2021	Best Hero	The Falcon and the Winter Soldier	Won	
NAACP Image Awards	2010	Outstanding Supporting Actor in a Motion Picture	The Hurt Locker	Nominated	
NAACP Image Awards	2011	Outstanding Actor in a Motion Picture	Night Catches Us	Nominated	
NAACP Image Awards	2012	Outstanding Supporting Actor in a Motion Picture	The Adjustment Bureau	Nominated	
NAACP Image Awards	2021	Outstanding Actor in a Motion Picture	The Banker	Nominated	
NAACP Image Awards	2022	Outstanding Actor in a Television Movie, Mini-Series or Dramatic Special	Solos	Nominated	
NAACP Image Awards	2026	Outstanding Character Voice Performance in a Motion Picture	Sneaks	Nominated	
Nickelodeon Kids' Choice Awards	2017	#SQUAD (shared with Chris Evans, Robert Downey Jr., Scarlett Johansson, Sebastian Stan, Don Cheadle, Jeremy Renner, and Chadwick Boseman)	Captain America: Civil War	Nominated	
Nickelodeon Kids' Choice Awards	2025	Favorite Butt-Kicker	Captain America: Brave New World	Nominated	
Obie Awards	2002	Ensemble (shared with Reg E. Cathey, Karen Kandel, John Seitz, James Himelsbach, and Maria Tucci)	Talk	Won	
Online Film Critics Society	2010	Best Supporting Actor	The Hurt Locker	Nominated	
Primetime Emmy Awards	2025	Outstanding Guest Actor in a Comedy Series	The Studio	Nominated	
Saturn Awards	2015	Best Supporting Actor	Captain America: The Winter Soldier	Nominated	
Saturn Awards	2022	Best Actor in a Television Series	The Falcon and the Winter Soldier	Nominated	
Screen Actors Guild Awards	2010	Outstanding Performance by a Cast in a Motion Picture	The Hurt Locker	Nominated	
Teen Choice Awards	2014	Choice Movie Scene Stealer	Captain America: The Winter Soldier	Nominated	
Teen Choice Awards	2014	Choice Movie: Chemistry (shared with Chris Evans)	Captain America: The Winter Soldier	Nominated	
Teen Choice Awards	2016	Choice Movie: Chemistry (shared with Chris Evans, Sebastian Stan, Elizabeth Olsen, and Jeremy Renner)	Captain America: Civil War	Nominated	
Washington D.C. Area Film Critics Association Awards	2009	Best Supporting Actor	The Hurt Locker	Nominated	
Washington D.C. Area Film Critics Association Awards	2009	Best Ensemble (shared with cast)	The Hurt Locker	Won	

== See also ==
- Anthony Mackie on screen and stage
