= Anthony Mackie =

American actor (born 1978)

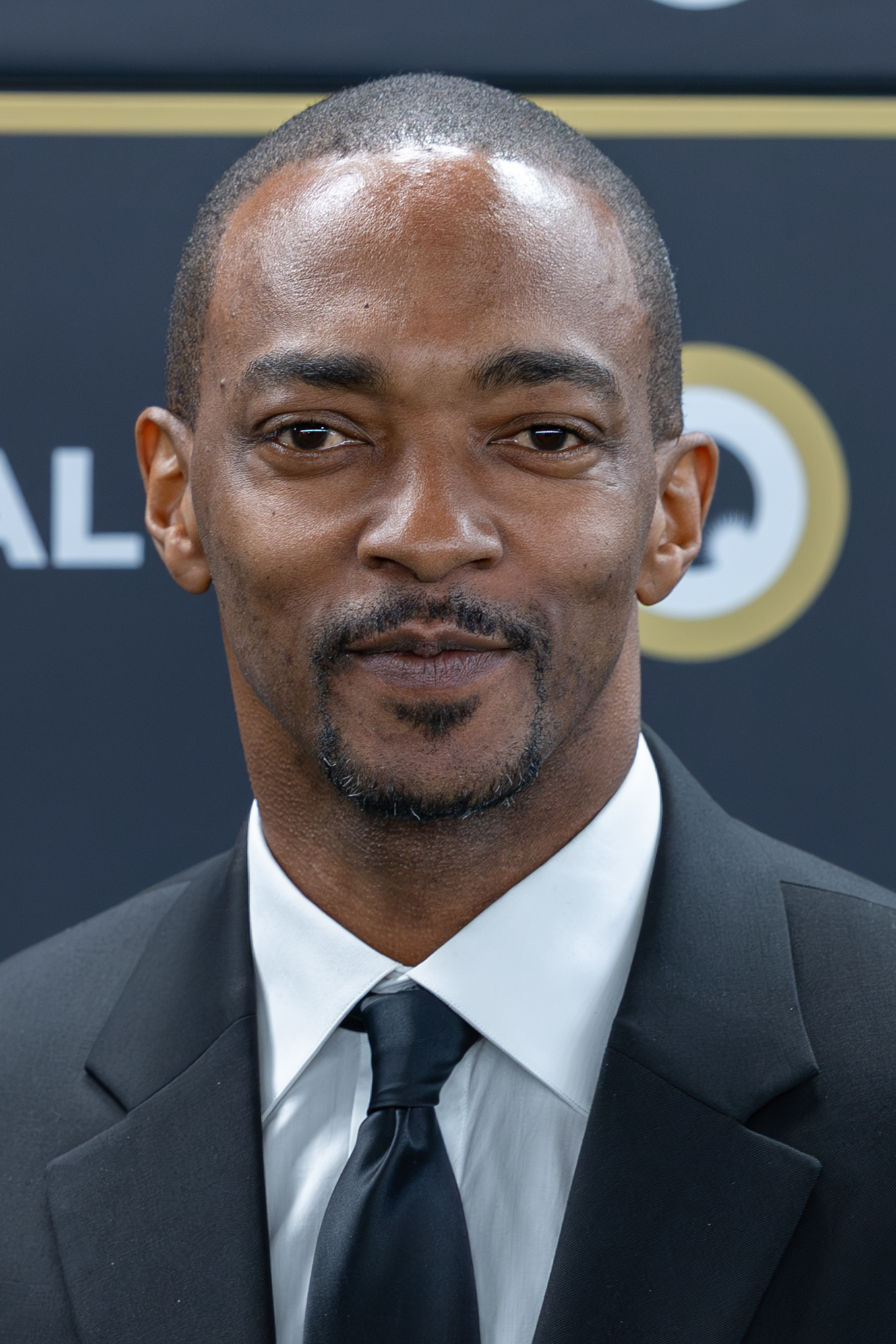
- Mackie in 2025
- Born: Anthony Dwane Mackie; September 23, 1978 (age 48); New Orleans, Louisiana, U.S.
- Education: Juilliard School (BA)
- Occupation: Actor
- Years active: 2001–present
- Works: Full list
- Spouse: Sheletta Chapital (m. 2014; div. 2018)
- Children: 4
- Relatives: Calvin Mackie (brother)
- Awards: Full list

Anthony Dwane Mackie (born September 23, 1978) is an American actor. He has appeared in blockbuster films and independent features, and has received accolades such as nominations for two Emmy Awards and a Screen Actors Guild Award.

Mackie was born in New Orleans, Louisiana and studied acting at Juilliard School, receiving a Bachelor of Arts in drama in 2001. He began his career appearing in a handful of stage productions, and made his film debut in 8 Mile (2002). While developing his career in films such as Million Dollar Baby (2004), Half Nelson (2006), Notorious (2009), and Real Steel (2011), he garnered critical acclaim and several awards for headlining Brother to Brother (2004) and co-starring in The Hurt Locker (2008).

Mackie gained global stardom for portraying Sam Wilson / Falcon / Captain America in the Marvel Cinematic Universe (MCU), beginning with Captain America: The Winter Soldier (2014) and including the solo projects The Falcon and the Winter Soldier (2021) and Captain America: Brave New World (2025). He continued to star in mainstream films such as Detroit (2017), The Hate U Give (2018), Synchronic (2019), and Elevation (2024), and in television projects such as All the Way (2016), Altered Carbon (2020), and Twisted Metal (2023–present). He earned Emmy nominations for hosting Shark Beach with Anthony Mackie: Gulf Coast (2024) and portraying a fictionalized version of himself in The Studio (2025).

== Early life ==
Mackie was born on September 23, 1978, in New Orleans, Louisiana to Willie Mackie Sr., a construction worker, and Martha (née Gordon), a stay-at-home mom. He has five siblings, including Calvin, a motivational speaker and entrepreneur. He aspired to act in his childhood, attending high school at the New Orleans Center for Creative Arts and, after his mother's death, the University of North Carolina School of the Arts. At age seventeen, he moved to New York City to attend Juilliard School, graduating in 2001 with a Bachelor of Arts in drama.

== Career ==
In 2002, Mackie worked as an understudy to Don Cheadle in Suzan-Lori Parks' play Topdog/Underdog and won an OBIE Award for his role in Carl Hancock Rux's play Talk. He appeared in the 2002 film 8 Mile as the main antagonist, Papa Doc. His first starring role in a feature film was the 2004 independent film Brother to Brother, where he played Perry, a young artist who struggles to adjust to the world as a gay black man. For his performance, he received nominations for the Gotham Award and the Independent Spirit Award for Best Breakthrough Performance. The following year, Mackie appeared in Million Dollar Baby, which won the Academy Award for Best Picture, and starred in Spike Lee's She Hate Me. In 2006, Mackie starred in Half Nelson, Crossover, and We Are Marshall.

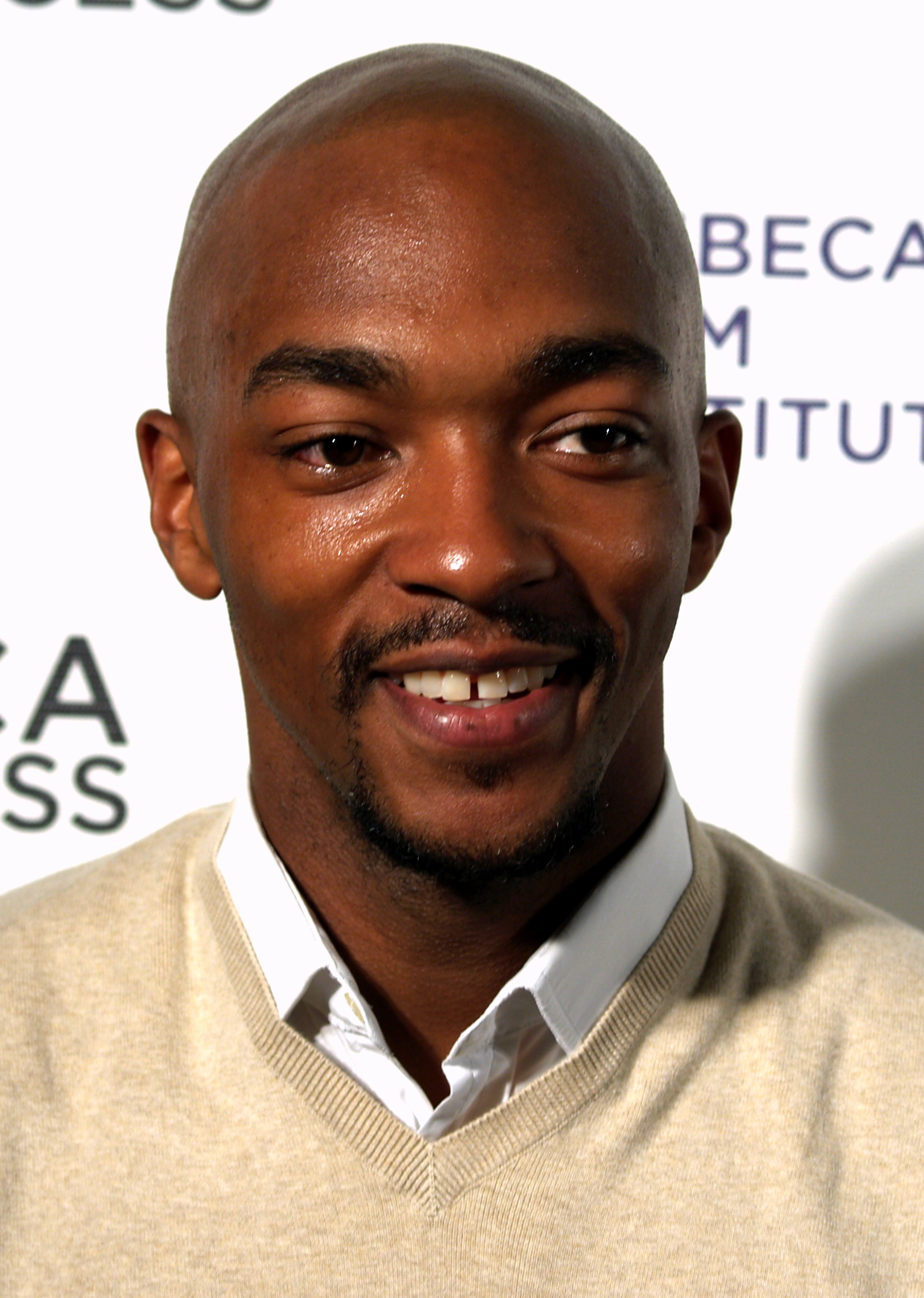
Mackie at the 2008 Tribeca Film Festival

In March 2008, Mackie starred in three plays by playwright August Wilson at the John F. Kennedy Center for the Performing Arts in Washington DC: Ma Rainey's Black Bottom, Fences, and Jitney – all part of "August Wilson's 20th Century", a month-long presentation of ten staged readings of Wilson's "Century Cycle". Mackie has participated several times in the "24-Hour Plays" held in New York City each fall. In mid-2009, he played the role of Pentheus in the New York City Public Theater's Shakespeare in the Park production of The Bacchae. He starred with Christopher Walken in A Behanding in Spokane on Broadway in February 2010.

Mackie portrayed late American rapper Tupac Shakur in the 2009 film Notorious; he had previously portrayed Shakur in the play Up Against the Wind in 2001, while attending Juilliard. In 2009, he co-starred in the war film The Hurt Locker, garnering widespread acclaim for his performance. Among other accolades, he won the Black Reel Award for Outstanding Supporting Actor and received nominations for the Independent Spirit Award for Best Supporting Male and the Screen Actors Guild Award for Outstanding Performance by a Cast in a Motion Picture. Mackie also narrated The Best That Never Was, a documentary about football player Marcus Dupree.

He appeared in the 2011 film The Adjustment Bureau as Harry Mitchell, a sympathetic member of a shadowy supernatural group that controls human destiny. Mackie co-starred as Sam Wilson / Falcon in the Marvel Cinematic Universe film Captain America: The Winter Soldier (2014), receiving a nomination for the Saturn Award for Best Supporting Actor. He reprised the role in multiple films over the next several years, including 2015's Avengers: Age of Ultron and Ant-Man, 2016's Captain America: Civil War, 2018's Avengers: Infinity War, and 2019's Avengers: Endgame. Of these, Avengers: Infinity War and Avengers: Endgame rank among the highest-grossing films of all time.

In 2016, Mackie portrayed Martin Luther King Jr. in the HBO TV drama All the Way. In 2018, Mackie appeared as gang leader King in The Hate U Give, a film adaptation of the bestselling novel of the same name. In 2019, Mackie had a role in the Netflix science-fiction film, IO. In July 2018, it was announced that Mackie was cast in the role of Takeshi Kovacs for the second season of Netflix's science-fiction series, Altered Carbon. In March 2019, it was announced that Mackie was cast in the fifth season of Netflix's science-fiction anthology series, Black Mirror.

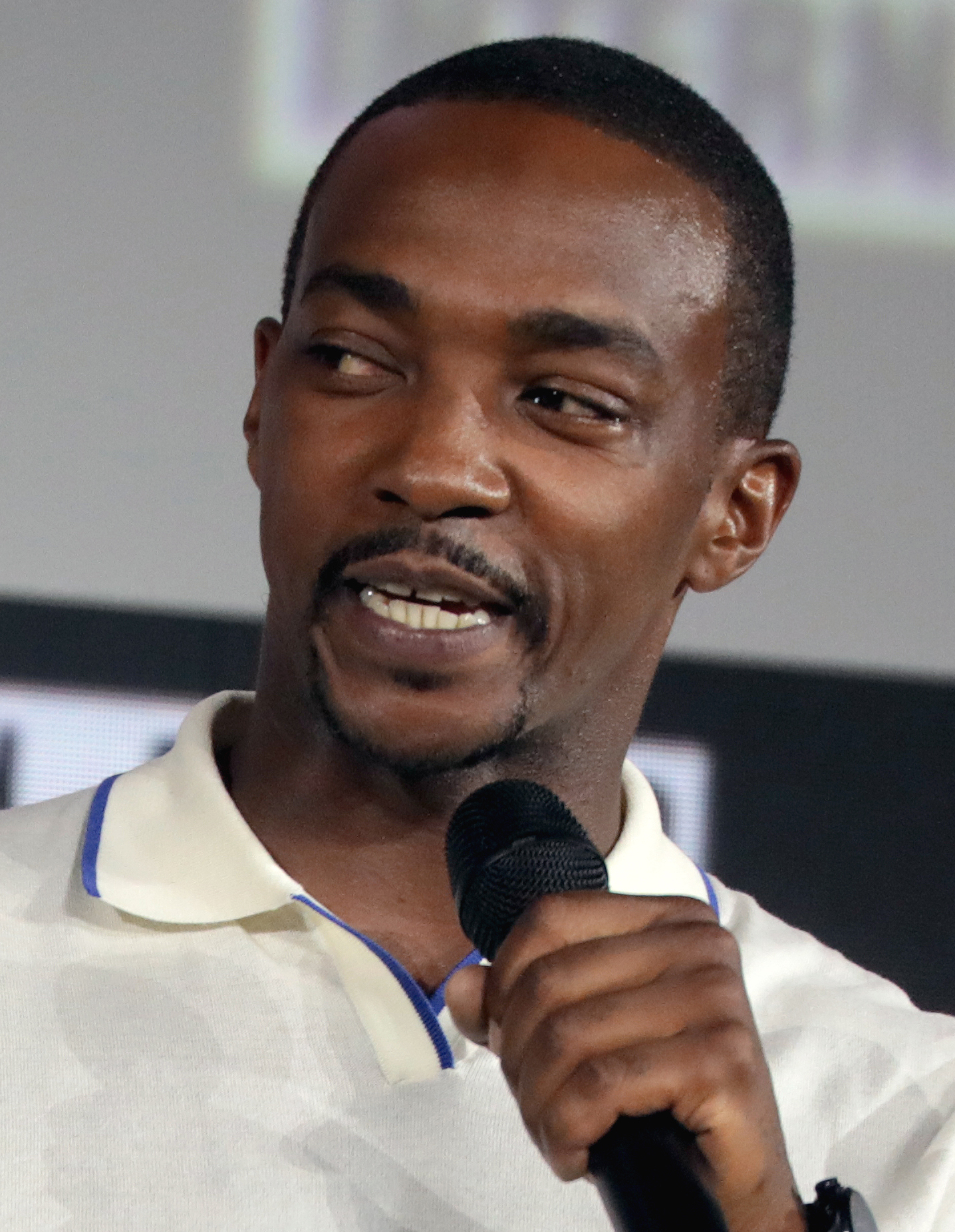
Mackie at the 2019 San Diego Comic-Con

Disney confirmed a Marvel television series starring Mackie and Sebastian Stan, called The Falcon and the Winter Soldier, would be aired on their upcoming Disney+ streaming service, debuting on March 19, 2021. For the role, he won the MTV Movie & TV Awards for Best Duo (with Stan) and Best Hero. He was also nominated for the Critics' Choice Super Award for Best Actor in a Superhero Series and the Saturn Award for Best Actor in a Streaming Television Series. Mackie starred in and produced the science fiction film Outside the Wire which was released by Netflix on January 15, 2021. In August 2021, he closed the deal to reprise the role of Sam Wilson in Captain America: Brave New World. He was nominated for the Critics' Choice Super Award for Best Actor in a Superhero Movie and the Nickelodeon Kids' Choice Award for Favorite Butt-Kicker.

In January 2022, it was announced that Mackie will helm the drama film Spark, starring Saniyya Sidney, as his directorial debut project. In February 2022, he was set to lead action film Ending Things along with Priyanka Chopra Jonas, directed by Kevin Sullivan and star in a live-action series adaptation of the game Twisted Metal at Peacock. In 2022, it was announced Mackie would be attached to a film based on the 1956 Sugar Bowl which features his brother's Alma mater Georgia Tech.

Mackie hosted the 2024 documentary series Shark Beach with Anthony Mackie: Gulf Coast, receiving his first nomination for the Daytime Emmy Award for Outstanding Lifestyle/Culinary Show Host. For portraying a fictionalized version of himself in the comedy series The Studio (2025), he was nominated for the Primetime Emmy Award for Outstanding Guest Actor in a Comedy Series. He is set to reprise his role as Sam Wilson in the upcoming Avengers movies, Avengers: Doomsday (2026) and Avengers: Secret Wars (2027).

== Personal life ==
In 2014, Mackie married his long-time girlfriend and childhood sweetheart Sheletta Chapital. They divorced in 2018. The ex-couple have four sons together and the family lives in New Orleans. In February 2025, Mackie was asked about his current love life and said he was just focusing on raising his children because: "The idea of dating is really hard. How do you trust someone? How do you put yourself in a position to be vulnerable? How do you know what someone really [wants] from you when all you want is to just be loved and appreciated? What does that look like?".

Mackie opened a bar called NoBar in Bedford–Stuyvesant, Brooklyn in the summer of 2011. He had plans to open a second NoBar in Williamsburg, Brooklyn in 2013.

In November 2013, Mackie was arrested for driving while intoxicated after he was initially stopped by police for having tinted windows, which are illegal in New York. He was pulled over at 1:22 a.m., officers noticed an odor of alcohol and observed that Mackie had bloodshot eyes. He was fined $300, ordered to complete a drunk driving program and banned from the road for 90 days in New York state for the violation.

Mackie has dyslexia.

== Acting credits and accolades ==
Mackie has received multiple awards and nominations, including nominations for two Emmy Awards and a Screen Actors Guild Award.
