= Rob Marshall (musician) =

British musician and producer

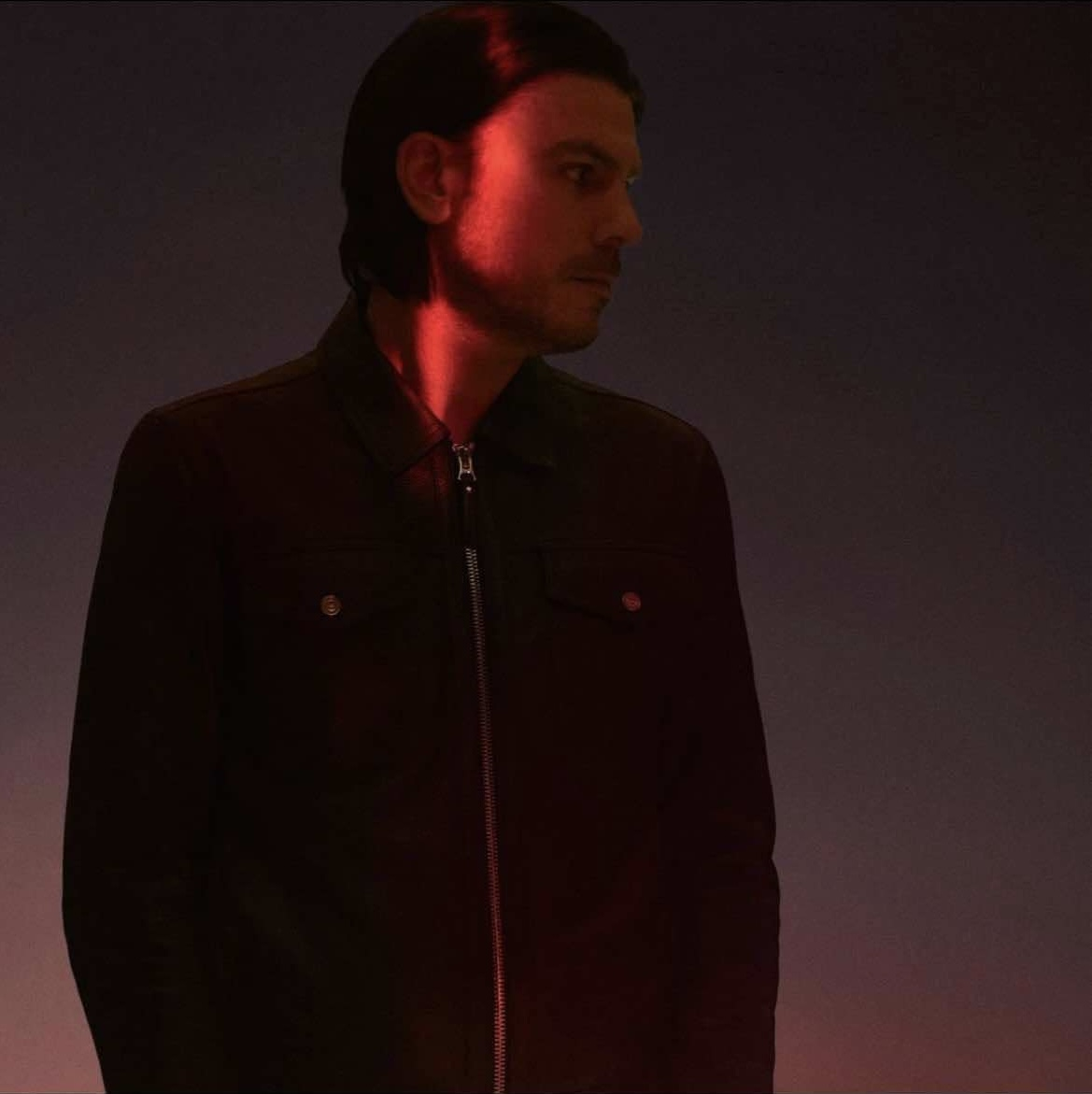
- Rob Marshall

Background information
- Origin: Teesside, England
- Genres: Alternative rock, post-punk, psychedelic rock, industrial rock
- Occupation(s): Musician, songwriter, record producer
- Instrument(s): Guitar, vocals
- Years active: 2000–present
- Website: www.rob-marshall.com

Rob Marshall is a British musician, songwriter, and producer best known as the creative force behind the cinematic rock project Humanist. He gained prominence as the guitarist for the band Exit Calm, and later through his collaborations with Mark Lanegan, co-writing and producing tracks for the late singer's acclaimed solo albums.

== Early life and career ==
Marshall is from Teesside in North East England. He began his music career in the shoegaze band Lyca Sleep, which evolved into the post-rock outfit Exit Calm. The band released two albums and supported Echo & the Bunnymen, Doves, and The Music before disbanding in 2015.

== Humanist ==
In 2016, Marshall launched Humanist]], a collaborative post-punk and alternative rock project. Working from his home studio in St Leonards-on-Sea, he wrote and recorded instrumental tracks before inviting guest vocalists to contribute. He described the project as "a soundtrack to a film not yet made."

The debut album, Humanist (2020, Ignition Records), featured Mark Lanegan, Dave Gahan (Depeche Mode), Carl Hancock Rux, Mark Gardener (Ride), and John Robb (The Membranes). MOJO called it “a stunning debut that plays like a soundtrack to a film not yet made.”

== On the Edge of a Lost and Lonely World ==
In 2024, Humanist released On the Edge of a Lost and Lonely World via Bella Union. The album included contributions from Dave Gahan, Isobel Campbell, Peter Hayes (Black Rebel Motorcycle Club), James Allan (Glasvegas), Carl Hancock Rux, Ed Harcourt, Tim Smith (Harp, Midlake) and posthumously, Mark Lanegan.

Record Collector called it "a widescreen experience that leans into melancholy, triumph, and catharsis."

=== Chart performance ===
- #71 – UK Albums Sales Chart
- #22 – UK Album Downloads Chart
- #16 – UK Independent Albums Chart
- #5 – UK Independent Album Breakers Chart

== Live performances ==
Humanist supported Depeche Mode on the Memento Mori European arena tour and joined Jane’s Addiction on their UK/EU headline tour in 2024. Marshall then led Humanist on a sold-out UK tour, with performances in Glasgow, Manchester, London, Bristol, and others.

== Collaborations with Mark Lanegan ==
Marshall co-wrote and co-produced six tracks on Lanegan's album Gargoyle (2017) and co-wrote and co-produced five tracks on Somebody's Knocking (2019). He also co-wrote, produced, and mixed "Song to Manset," which was released as the B-side to Mark Lanegan Band’s "Stitch It Up" 7" single for Record Store Day 2019. Lanegan’s voice features prominently on Humanist’s debut. In Anthony Bourdain: Parts Unknown, Lanegan performed one of their songs, showcasing the duo’s creative bond.

== Style and influences ==
Marshall's sound is described as cinematic, post-punk-inspired, and emotionally immersive. Critics compare his work to Joy Division, Nick Cave and the Bad Seeds, and Ennio Morricone.

== Discography ==
With Exit Calm

- Exit Calm (2010)
- The Future Isn’t What It Used To Be (2013)

As Humanist

- Humanist (2020)
- On the Edge of a Lost and Lonely World (2024)

With Mark Lanegan

- Gargoyle (2017) – Co-writer/Producer
- Somebody’s Knocking (2019) – Co-writer/Producer
