= Humanist (band) =

British collaborative music project

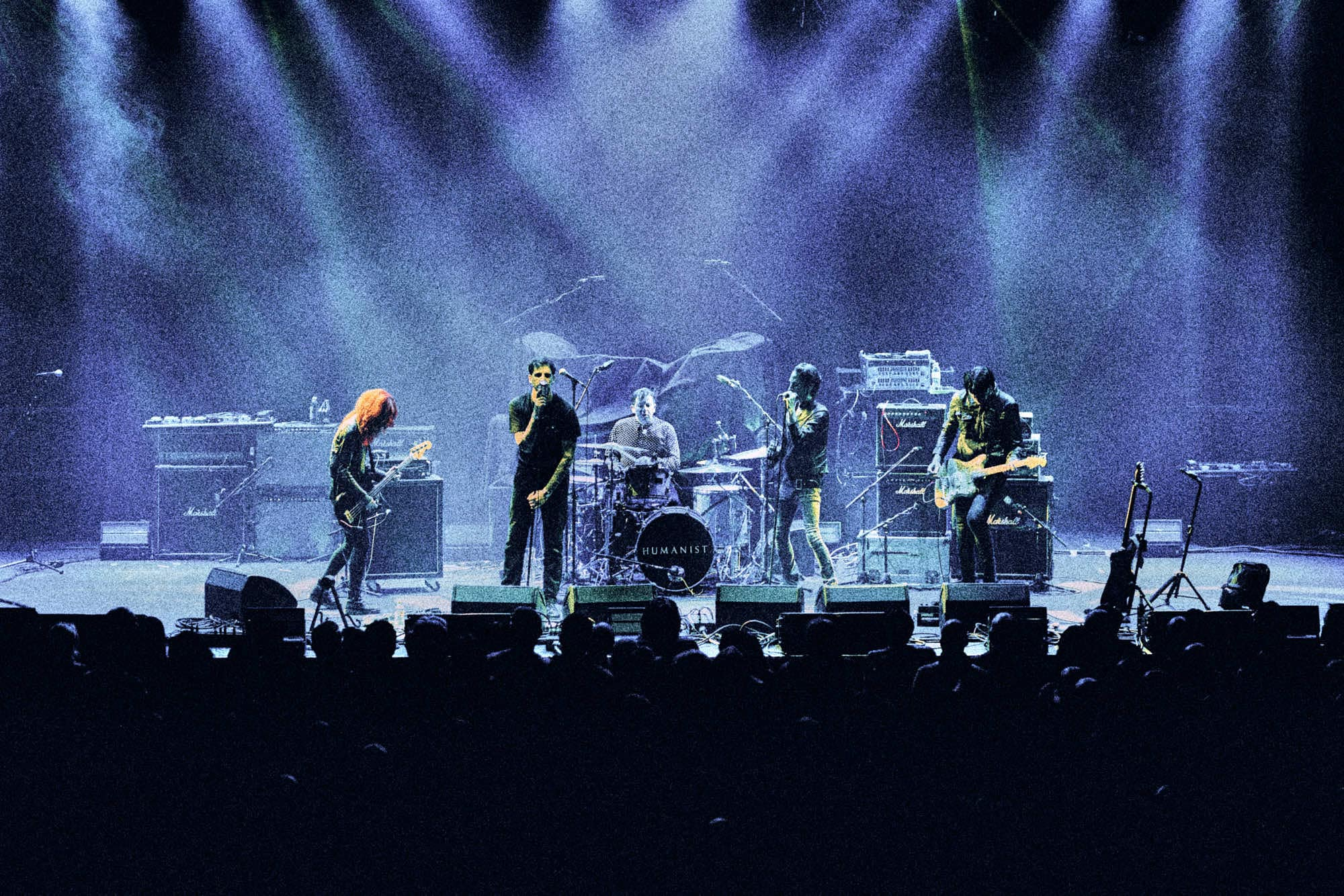
- Humanist performing live

Background information
- Origin: Teesside, England
- Genres: Alternative rock, post-punk, industrial rock, cinematic rock
- Years active: 2016–present
- Labels: Ignition, Bella Union
- Members: Rob Marshall: Scott Pemberton; Wendy Rae Fowler
- Website: www.rob-marshall.com

Humanist is a British collaborative music project founded in 2016 by guitarist, songwriter, and producer Rob Marshall. Known for its cinematic fusion of post-punk, alternative rock, and industrial textures, Humanist features a rotating cast of guest vocalists. The project's self-titled debut album was released in 2020 via Ignition Records, followed by On the Edge of a Lost and Lonely World in 2024 through Bella Union. The band has performed live in the UK and across Europe, supporting major acts such as Depeche Mode and Jane's Addiction.

== Background ==
Following the disbandment of his previous band Exit Calm, Rob Marshall launched Humanist as a collaborative studio project. Inspired by themes of mortality, identity, and the human spirit, Marshall composed instrumental tracks in his home studio in Hastings before inviting vocalists to contribute lyrics and performances. His first collaborator was Mark Lanegan, who would go on to become a recurring voice in the project.

== Albums ==
=== Humanist (2020) ===
Released in February 2020 on Ignition Records and published by Warp Publishing, Humanist featured an array of guest artists, including Mark Lanegan, Dave Gahan (Depeche Mode), Mark Gardener (Ride), Joel Cadbury, Carl Hancock Rux, Jim Jones, and John Robb.

Kerrang! praised the album's collaborative depth, calling it “a brooding songbook fuelled by echoing post-punk guitars and electronic embellishments,” while Brum Live described it as “an all-killer-no-filler album.”

=== On the Edge of a Lost and Lonely World (2024) ===
Humanist's second album, On the Edge of a Lost and Lonely World, was released in July 2024 by Bella Union. Influenced by the passing of Mark Lanegan and written during the COVID-19 pandemic, the album addresses themes of grief, transcendence, and rebirth. Featured vocalists include Dave Gahan, Isobel Campbell, Peter Hayes (Black Rebel Motorcycle Club), James Allan (Glasvegas), Ed Harcourt, Tim Smith (Harp, Midlake), and Carl Hancock Rux.

Critical reception was positive. Record Collector described it as “a widescreen experience that leans into melancholy, triumph, and catharsis.”

=== Chart performance ===
- #71 – UK Albums Sales Chart
- #22 – UK Album Downloads Chart
- #16 – UK Independent Albums Chart
- #5 – UK Independent Album Breakers Chart

== Live performances ==
Humanist began performing live in 2021 following the release of their debut album. The UK tour featured lead vocals from James Mudriczki (formerly of Puressence) and included stops in Birmingham, Newcastle, Glasgow, Sheffield, Manchester, Brighton, and London. Support acts included Suzie Stapleton, White Noise Cinema, and Fears.

In 2024, Humanist returned to the stage with a new live lineup. Wendy Rae Fowler joined the band as a bassist as main support for the Depeche Mode Memento Mori tour and has remained as a core member since. They supported Depeche Mode on the European leg of their Memento Mori arena tour and later joined Jane’s Addiction on their UK and EU headline tour. A sold-out UK headline tour followed, with performances in Glasgow, Manchester, London, Birmingham, Brighton, and Bristol. The lineup featured vocalists Jimmy Gnecco (Ours) and James Cox (Crows), praised for their dynamic interpretations.

== Musical style and influences ==
Humanist’s sound combines post-punk, alternative rock, industrial textures, and cinematic scoring. Rob Marshall’s use of layered guitars, analog synths, and reverb-heavy production gives the music a widescreen quality.

== Discography ==
=== Studio albums ===
- Humanist (2020, Ignition Records)
- On the Edge of a Lost and Lonely World (2024, Bella Union)
