= Good Bread Alley =

- Good Bread Alley Cd Cover, 2006

Studio album by Carl Hancock Rux
- Released: May 23, 2006
- Genre: R&B, electronic
- Length: 52:09
- Label: Thirsty Ear Music

Carl Hancock Rux chronology
Apothecary Rx (2004)	Good Bread Alley (2006)

Professional ratings
Review scores
Source	Rating
Allmusic	4/5 stars
PopMatters	8/10 stars
Robert Christgau	(dud)
Tiny Mix Tapes	(3/5)

Good Bread Alley is the third studio album of Carl Hancock Rux. Titled after a close-knit historically African American district of shotgun houses that once occupied a segregated neighborhood in Miami, Florida, the cd was released by Thirsty Ear Music, produced by Carl Hancock Rux with songwriting and co-songwriting credits from Geoff Barrow, Vinicius Cantuária, David Holmes, Rob Hyman, Stewart Lerman, Darren Morris, Phil Mossman, Vernon Reid, Tim Saul, Jaco Van Schalkwyk, and Bill Withers. The cd tackles religion, sexual politics, war and media overload, in the tradition of Marvin Gaye and Donny Hathaway, employing supersaturated, open-ended soul music with bluesy vamps, touches of minimalism, and slide-guitar licks providing a rich backdrop for Rux's sardonic baritone, achieving a pop-gospel synthesis.

== Track listing ==
1. "Good Bread Alley" 5:47
2. "My Brother's Hands" 5:13
3. "Thadius Star" 5:09
4. "Behind the Curtain" 4:55
5. "Lies" 3:31
6. "Geneva" 3:27
7. "Black of My Shadow" 4:35
8. "All the Rock Stars" 4:13
9. "Living Room" 3:53
10. "I Can't Write Left Handed" 7:25
11. "Better Left Unsaid (Complete Lost Session Tapes)" 5:20

== Personnel ==
- Carl Hancock Rux (lead and background vocals, programming)
- Kwame Brandt Pierce (piano, keyboards, harpsichord)
- Brian Charette (keyboard)
- Rob Hyman (keyboard)
- Jason DeMatteo (acoustic bass)
- Fred Cash (electric bass)
- Stewart Lerman (electric bass)
- Chris Eddleton (percussion)
- Sammy Merendino (drums)
- Dave Tronzo (slide guitar)
- Vinicius Cantuaria (acoustic guitar)
- Leroy Jenkins (violin)
- Jaco van Schalkwyk (samples, noise programming)
- Marcelle Lashley (featured and background vocals)
- Helga Davis: (featured and background vocals)
- Christalyn Wright (background vocals)
- Stephanie Battle (background vocals)
- Dave Darlington (Engineer)
- Michael Stryder (Photography)
- Lorraine Walsh (Art Direction)
