= Jane Comfort =

Jane Comfort of Oak Ridge, Tennessee is an American choreographer, director, and dancer. She is the founder and artistic director of Jane Comfort and Company based in New York, NY.

== Biography ==
Jane Comfort earned a B.A. in Painting from the University of North Carolina at Chapel Hill before finding her way to dance. After two years in the Peace Corps in Venezuela, she moved to New York and began studying with Merce Cunningham. She performed with a number of downtown choreographers, including David Gordon, Dana Reitz, Kenneth King, and Jamie Cunningham, before founding her own company in 1978. She has collaborated with visual artists, composers, spoken word artists, DJ's, puppeteers, and dancers to create dance theater works that integrate text, movement, politics, and explicitly "un-dance-like" theatrical scenarios. Her work has been produced in Europe, South America, and throughout the United States. Comfort has never shied from relevant social issues and her work gives voice to those afflicted by these issues: women, gays and lesbians, the homeless, the disabled, and the abused.

== Choreography ==
Jane Comfort has choreographed many works for modern dance stage as well as off-Broadway, Broadway, and opera stages.

=== Jane Comfort and Company ===
- Steady Shift (1978)
- Sign Story (1979)
- Eatless Textures (1981)
- Incorrect Translations (1982)
- Artificial Horizon (1983)
- Four Screaming Women (1984)
- TV Love (1985)
- Cliffs Notes: Macbeth (1986)
- Portrait (1989)
- Deportment: South (1990)
- Deportment: North (1991)
- Faith Healing (1993)
- S/He (1995)
- Three Bagatelles for the Righteous (1996)
- Underground River (1998) Bessie Award
- Asphalt (2001)
- Persephone (2004)'
- Fleeting Thoughts: Mr. Henderson's 3AM (2006)
- An American Rendition (2008)
- Beauty (2012)
- Altiplano (2015)
- You Are Here (2016)
- 40th Anniversary Retrospective (2018) Bessie Award for Best Revival Performance

=== Choreography Credits ===
- Passion (1994) Original Broadway Musical, Plymouth Theatre, NY
- Amour (2002) Original Broadway Musical, Music Box Theatre, NY
- Wilder (2003) Original Off-Broadway Musical, Playwrights Horizons, NY
- Much Ado About Nothing (2004) Shakespeare in The Park, Central Park, NY
- Salome (2006) Opera, Lyric Opera of Chicago

== Awards ==
- National Endowment for the Arts 2016, 2018, 2019
- New York Dance and Performance Award (Bessie Award) 1998, 2018
- Creative Capital Performing Arts Award 2000
- Guggenheim Fellowship 2010
- American Dance Guild Lifetime Achievement Award 2018

== Collaborators ==
Comfort has worked with several artists to produce multidisciplinary dance theater works throughout her career. Her past collaborators include Tigger Benford, Arthur Elgort, Carl Hancock Rux, Joan La Barbara, Steve Miller, Toshi Reagon, Keith Sonnier, DJ Spooky, and puppeteer Basil Twist.
