= Apothecary Rx =

Apothocary Rx

Studio album by Carl Hancock Rux
- Released: June 1, 2004
- Genre: R&B/Electronic
- Length: 57.30
- Label: Giant Step
- Producer: Carl Hancock Rux, Stewart Lerman, Rob Hyman

Carl Hancock Rux chronology
Rux Revue (1999)	Apothocary Rx (2004)	Good Bread Alley (2006)

Apothecary Rx is the second studio album by Carl Hancock Rux, produced by Rob Hyman (of The Hooters) and Stewart Lerman. The album also features singer Stephanie McKay and contributions from jazz violinist Leroy Jenkins and singer-songwriter Marc Anthony Thompson (of Chocolate Genius). The album was selected by French writer Phillippe Robert for his 2008 publication "Great Black Music": an exhaustive tribute of 110 albums including 1954's Lady Sings The Blues by Billie Holiday, the work of Jazz artists Oliver Nelson, Max Roach, John Coltrane; rhythm and blues artists Otis Redding, Ike & Tina Turner, Curtis Mayfield, George Clinton; as well as individual impressions of Fela Kuti, Jimi Hendrix, and Mos Def.

== Track listing ==
1. I Got a Name (5:00)
2. Me (4:29)
3. Ground (6:23)
4. Eleven more Days (4:49)
5. Disrupted Dreams (4:19)
6. Protean Character (4:36)
7. Shadow Interlude (0:51)
8. Fanon (5:32)
9. Lamentations (5:46)
10. Trouble of this World (4:50)
11. Apothecary Song (4:56)
12. Rx Suite: Movement 1 (5:51)

== Personnel ==
- Carl Hancock Rux: vocals/producer
- Stewart Lerman: producer
- Rob Hyman: producer
- Stephanie McKay: featured vocalist
- Helga Davis: background vocals
- Marcelle Lashley: background vocals
- Irene Datcher: background vocals
- Vinicius Cantuária: acoustic guitar
- Marc Anthony Thompson: guitar
- Dave Tronzo: guitar
- Fred Cash: bass
- Steve Cohen: bass
- Leroy Jenkins: violin
- Ron Trent: percussion

== Critical reception ==
Professional ratings
Review scores
Source	Rating
Allmusic	4.5/5 stars

"After six years since Carl Hancock Rux released his debut album, he "comes thundering back with one of the most expansive, ambitious, and musical recordings to come down the pipe in a long while. What ties these tracks together besides the musician's lyrical savvy (think scholarly, yet street lean and mean from the Gil Scott-Heron old school) and exceptional ear is almighty rhythm, as a cipher, as a shape-shifting ever-present in a musical meld that touches on everything from the Delta blues and Storyville to vanguard rock, vintage R&B, classic and futuristic pop, tough urban soul, and of course, the rainbow of sounds and beats that is hip-hop. A strange and unwieldy cast of characters were assembled for this set, including guitarist Dave Tronzo, avant jazz violin legend Leroy Jenkins, Marc Anthony Thompson (aka Chocolate Genius), Brazilian samba guitar genius Vinicius Cantuaria, Rob Hyman from the Hooters (who wrote "Time After Time" for Cyndi Lauper), and backing vocalists such as Irene Datcher, Stephanie McKay, and Helga Davis. Co-produced with help from Stewart Lerman (Black 47, Dar Williams), Rux assembles a montage of sounds that weave through and around one another in a constant effluvium of urban music that continually references and overwrites its history politically, socially, and spiritually. On the opener, "I Got a Name," with its shimmering African juju guitars that open onto a body of dubbed-out, compressed pianos, multi-layered percussion, and throbbing bass lines, Rux sings, raps, and chants his way through to establish an identity in the African diaspora as it stands tall as its own signifier, the American urban landscape. On "Eleven More Days," the contrast of generations, religions, races, and social statures is played out on subway platforms, playgrounds, slam apartments, prisons, and in the streets. While Rux iterates the terrain and circumstances in his landscape, a stunning gospel refrain sung by a chorus of female voices emphasizes the place of intersection, the place of hope, the place of loss, and even deliverance while contrasting contrapuntal synthetic rhythms slip around bass lines and indeterminate sounds. And while these two selections provide a view, they are by no means the only ones. Everywhere polyrhythmic strategies, multivalent pop textures, and smoky roots musics fold into one another, sometimes clashing but more often just touching and caressing one another before they move on to get Rux's poetic depth of field across, and that field never cancels anything out of its articulation, except perhaps hopelessness. Apothecary RX is indeed a prescription: musically it opens wide the current closed scene of alliteration, endless insider referencing, and production conceits by sounding organic and visceral without ever bogging down in its own ambition. Lyrically, it offers voices, many of them, sometimes speaking simultaneously, sometimes out of the depths of solitude, and they speak from reportorial detachment as well as from pain and joy and the desire to transcend as well as be delivered. Rux has created something off the boards here, unclassifiable, truly beautiful and moving. It is as unrelenting in its excellence as it is in its ambition." Thom Jurek AllMusic .
