= The Temptation of Saint Anthony (opera) =

Opera by Bernice Johnson Reagon

- by Bernice Johnson Reagon
- Librettist: Reagon
- Based on: The Temptation of Saint Anthony by Gustave Flaubert
- Premiere: June 2003; Ruhrtriennale, Duisburg

The Temptation of St. Anthony is an opera rooted in the gospel tradition based on the novel The Temptation of Saint Anthony by Gustave Flaubert, directed by Robert Wilson with book, libretto and music by Bernice Johnson Reagon and costumes by Geoffrey Holder. The production debuted in June 2003 as part of the Ruhrtriennale festival in Duisburg Germany with Carl Hancock Rux as Saint Anthony and Helga Davis as Helarion.

Subsequent performances included the Greek Theater in Siracusa, Italy; the Festival di Peralada in Peralada, Spain; the Palacio de Festivales de Cantabria in Santander, Spain; and Sadler's Wells in London, Great Britain; the Teatro Piccinni in Bari, Italy; the Het Muziektheater in Amsterdam, Netherlands; the Teatro Arriaga in Bilbao and the Teatro Espanol in Madrid, Spain. The opera made its American premiere at the Brooklyn Academy of Music's BAM Next Wave Festival in October 2004. The official "world premiere" was held at the Paris Opera Garnier becoming the first all African American opera to perform on its stage since the inauguration of the Académie Nationale de Musique - Théâtre de l'Opéra in 1875.
