= Asphalt (novel) =

2004 novel by Carl Hancock Rux

- Author: Carl Hancock Rux
- Publisher: Atria
- Publication date: May 18, 2004
- ISBN: 978-0-743-47400-9

Asphalt is a dystopian novel of speculative fiction by American writer Carl Hancock Rux and published by Atria/Simon & Schuster in 2004. The novel was completed while Rux was briefly in residence at the famed Chelsea Hotel in New York City.

== Plot ==
Racine, an expatriate DJ, returns from an ill-fated stay in Paris to a war-torn New York City and finds himself lodged in a deteriorating civil war era brownstone mansion in a Brooklyn neighborhood devastated by poverty and despair. Here he meets Manny, a crossdressing free spirit with a penchant for women and architectural history; Mawepi the stout bouncer and translator for the clairvoyant yet reclusive Holy Mother Lucinda; and Couchette, an emotionally scarred erotic dancer mired in denial regarding her famous jazz musician father's suicide. Immediately Racine finds himself creating the sonic backdrop for intense parties, orgies, and conversations while Manny and the other residents chase their dreams in a transitional New York. Couchette is the troubled spirit with whom Racine shares physically intimate and emotionally frustrating moments. The story weaves depictions of Racine's childhood, including his mother's death by fire when he was an infant; his experiences living with his brother, Frederick, in the custody of an uncle who is a disturbed religious zealot; Frederick's mysterious accidental death; Racine's eventual abandonment and years in foster care under the guardianship of a caring alcoholic; and the truth of his recent trip to France to visit a former schoolmate, Benoit, and his girlfriend.

== Themes ==
Rux infuses his tale with Greek mythology, mirroring Racine's tragic life experiences with that of Euripides' Hippolytus who is physically dismembered by a monstrous force on his journey to redemption. The characters in Asphalt all employ different strategies for abandoning experiences that have consumed and distorted their views of reality and their conflict with memory. The novel poses rhetorically embedded questions about abandoned buildings and the psychological aftereffects of war-torn cities regarding how cultures and individuals handle suffering, loss, and unresolved tragedy.

=== Principal characters ===
- Racine—the protagonist DJ returned from life abroad in France to a war-torn New York City
- Couchette —erotic dancer whose mother has absconded to Bali and whose jazz musician father killed himself in the very brownstone in which she now lives
- Manny—heterosexual transvestite drug dealer, a former student of architectural history; anti-imperialist radical and pyromaniac
- Benoit—Racine's childhood friend, a French American aspiring Post-Impressionist and neo-Symbolist filmmaker now living in La Croix-Rousse, a historical neighborhood in Lyon, France.
- Nathalie—Benoit's girlfriend
- Lucinda—Elderly Spanish-speaking spiritualist, known by her sobriquet "Holy Mother Santa"; the landlord of a squatter's den
- Mawepi—Lucinda's guardian and translator

=== Secondary characters ===
- Frederick—Racine's older brother who died mysteriously when they were children.
- Eddie—Racine's great uncle, a World War Two veteran turned disturbed religious zealot.
- Emma—Eddie's twin sister, Racine's maternal grandmother.
- Geneva—Racine's mentally ill mother who died in a fire when he and his brother were children.
