= Anthony Mackie on screen and stage =

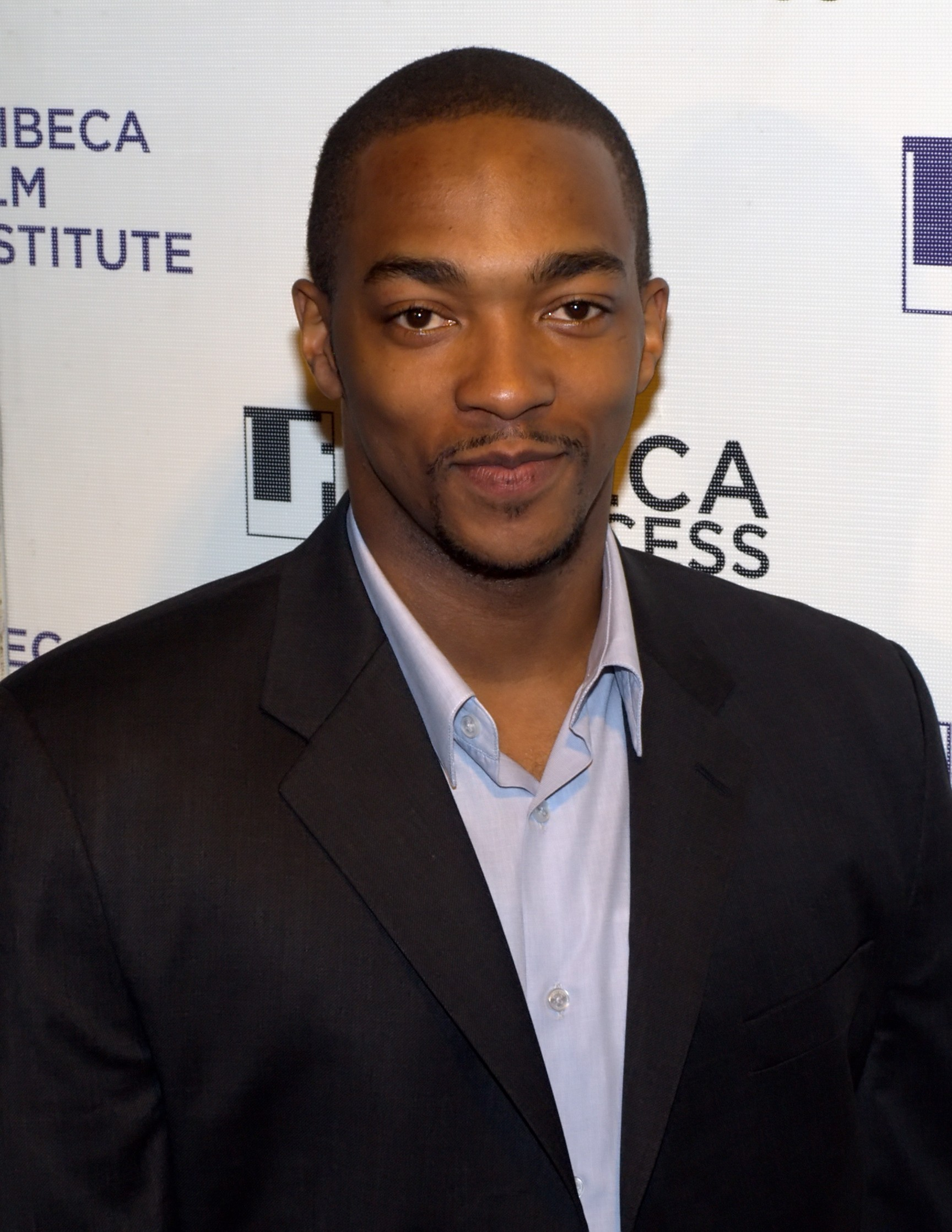
Mackie attending the 2010 Tribeca Film Festival

Anthony Mackie is an American actor. The following is his filmography throughout his entire acting career. He has received multiple awards and nominations, including nominations for two Emmy Awards and a Screen Actors Guild Award.

== Film ==
Key
†	Denotes films that have not yet been released

List of Anthony Mackie film credits
Year	Title	Role	Notes	Ref.
2002	8 Mile	Clarence "Papa Doc"		
2003	Crossing	Cass	Short film	
2003	Hollywood Homicide	Killer "Joker"		
2004	Brother to Brother	Perry		
2004	The Manchurian Candidate	PFC Robert Baker		
2004	She Hate Me	John Henry "Jack" Armstrong		
2004	Haven	Hammer		
2004	Million Dollar Baby	Shawrelle Berry		
2005	The Man	Booty		
2006	Freedomland	Billy Williams		
2006	Half Nelson	Frank		
2006	Heavens Fall	William Lee		
2006	We Are Marshall	Nate Ruffin		
2006	Crossover	Tech		
2007	Ascension Day	Nathaniel "Nat" Turner		
2008	Eagle Eye	Major William Bowman A		
2009	The Hurt Locker	Sergeant J. T. Sanborn		
2009	American Violet	Eddie Porter		
2009	Notorious	Tupac Shakur		
2009	Desert Flower	Harold Jackson		
2010	Night Catches Us	Marcus Washington		
2011	The Adjustment Bureau	Harry Mitchell		
2011	10 Years	Andre Irine		
2011	What's Your Number?	Tom Piper		
2011	Real Steel	Finn		
2012	Man on a Ledge	Mike Ackerman		
2012	Abraham Lincoln: Vampire Hunter	Will Johnson		
2013	Gangster Squad	Coleman Harris		
2013	Repentance	Tommy Carter		
2013	Pain & Gain	Adrian Doorbal		
2013	The Fifth Estate	Sam Coulson		
2013	Runner Runner	Agent Eric Shavers		
2013	The Inevitable Defeat of Mister & Pete	Kris		
2014	Captain America: The Winter Soldier	Sam Wilson / Falcon		
2014	Black or White	Jeremiah Jeffers		
2014	Shelter	Tahir		
2014	Playing It Cool	Bryan		
2015	Avengers: Age of Ultron	Sam Wilson / Falcon		
2015	Ant-Man	Sam Wilson / Falcon		
2015	Our Brand Is Crisis	Ben		
2015	Love the Coopers	Officer Percy Williams		
2015	The Night Before	Chris Roberts		
2016	Triple 9	Marcus Belmont		
2016	Captain America: Civil War	Sam Wilson / Falcon		
2017	Detroit	Karl Greene		
2018	Avengers: Infinity War	Sam Wilson / Falcon		
2018	The Hate U Give	King		
2019	Io	Micah	Also executive producer	
2019	Miss Bala	Jimmy		
2019	Avengers: Endgame	Sam Wilson / Falcon		
2019	Point Blank	Paul Booker		
2019	Synchronic	Steve Denube		
2019	Seberg	Hakim Jamal		
2020	The Banker	Bernard Garrett	Also producer	
2021	Outside the Wire	Captain Leo	Also producer	
2021	The Woman in the Window	Edward "Ed" Fox		
2023	We Have a Ghost	Frank		
2023	If You Were the Last	Adam Gary		
2023	Ghosted	Grandson of Sam	Cameo	
2024	Elevation	Will	Also producer	
2025	Captain America: Brave New World	Sam Wilson / Captain America	Also executive producer	
2025	The Electric State	Herman (voice)		
2025	Sneaks	Ty (voice)		
2025	Desert Warrior	Hanzala		
2026	Avengers: Doomsday	Sam Wilson / Captain America	Post-production	
TBA	Speed-the-Plow	Bob Grant	Post-production	
TBA	Barracuda	Karl	Post-production	

== Television ==
List of Anthony Mackie television credits
Year	Title	Role	Notes	Ref.
2002	As If	Bar Patron	Episode: "Seven"; uncredited	
2003	Law & Order: Criminal Intent	Carl Hines	Episode: "Pravda"	
2004	Sucker Free City	K-Luv (Keith)	Television film	
2010	30 for 30	Narrator	Episode: "The Best That Never Was"	
2013	Top Chef: New Orleans	Himself	Episode: “Like Mama Made”	
2016	All the Way	Martin Luther King Jr.	Television film	
2018	Animals	Receipt (voice)	2 episodes	
2019	Black Mirror	Danny Parker	Episode: "Striking Vipers"	
2020	Altered Carbon	Takeshi Kovacs	8 episodes	
2021	The Falcon and the Winter Soldier	Sam Wilson / Falcon / Captain America	6 episodes	
2021	Marvel Studios: Assembled	Himself	Episode: "The Making of The Falcon and the Winter Soldier"	
2021	Solos	Tom	Episode: "Tom"	
2023–present	Twisted Metal	John Doe	22 episodes; also executive producer	
2024	What If...?	Sam Wilson / Captain America (voice)	Episode: "What If... the Hulk Fought the Mech Avengers?"	
2025	The Studio	Himself	Episode: "The Note"	
2026	12 12 12	Jack Strickland	Also executive producer	

== Video games ==
List of Anthony Mackie video game credits
Year	Title	Role	Notes	Ref.
2018	NBA 2K19	Big Tunney	Also motion capture	

== Stage ==
List of Anthony Mackie stage credits
Year	Title	Role	Venue	Ref.
2001	Up Against the Wind	Tupac Shakur	Off-Broadway debut	
2002	Talk	Moderator	Off-Broadway	
2003	Ma Rainey's Black Bottom	Sylvester, understudy Levee	Broadway debut	
2004	Drowning Crow	Constantine Trip	Broadway	
2005	McReele	Darius McReele	Off-Broadway	
2005	A Soldier's Play	Private First Class Melvin Peterson	Off-Broadway	
2008	The Good Negro	James Lawrence	Off-Broadway	
2009	The Bacchae	Pentheus	Off-Broadway	
2010	A Behanding in Spokane	Toby	Broadway	
2027	Macbeth	Macbeth	Broadway	

== Theme park attractions ==
List of Anthony Mackie theme park attraction credits
Year	Title	Role	Notes	Ref.
2022	Avengers: Quantum Encounter	Sam Wilson / Captain America	Disney Wish	

== See also ==
- List of awards and nominations received by Anthony Mackie
