= Dianne Smith =

American artist

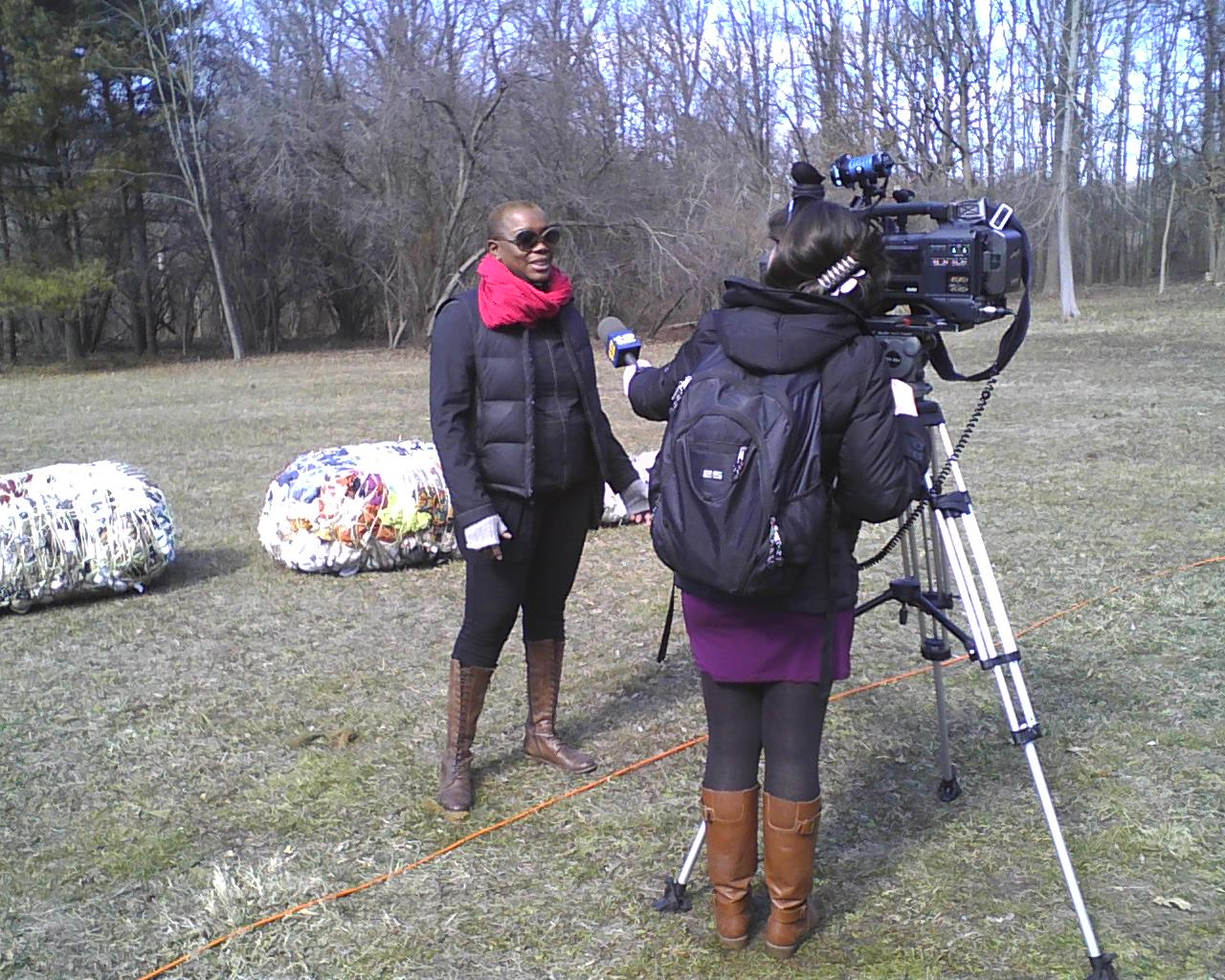
Public art work at Bartow-Pell Mansion in the Bronx

Dianne Smith (born 1965) is an abstract painter, sculptor, and installation artist. Her work has been exhibited in solo and group exhibitions in New York City's Soho and Chelsea art districts as well as, numerous galleries and institutions throughout the United States, and abroad. She is an arts educator in the field of Aesthetic Education at Lincoln Center Education, which is part of New York City's Lincoln Center For the Performing Arts. Since the invitation to join the Institute almost a decade ago she has taught pre k-12 in public schools throughout the Tri-State area. Her work as an arts educator also extends to undergraduate and graduate courses in various colleges and universities in the New York City area. She has taught at Lehman College, Brooklyn College, Columbia University Teachers College, City College, and St. John's University.

In 2007, she was one of the artists featured in the Boondoggle Film documentary Colored Frames. The film took a look back at 50 years in African-American Art, and also featured other artists such as Benny Andrews, Ed Clark and Danny Simmons. That same year the historical Abyssinian Baptist Church, which is New York's oldest African-American church, commissioned Smith to create the artwork commemorating their 2008 bicentennial. In addition, she co-produced an online radio show the New Palette, for ArtonAir.org Art International Radio dedicated to visual artists of color. Her private collectors include: Poet Dr. Maya Angelou, Broadway choreographer George Faison, Danny Simmons, Vivica A. Fox, Rev. and Mrs. Calvin O. Butts, III, Cicely Tyson, Arthur Mitchell, Tasha Smith and Terry McMillan. Dianne Smith is a Bronx native of Belizean descent. She attended LaGuardia High School of Music and Art, the Otis Parsons School of Design and the Fashion Institute of Technology. Smith completed her MFA at Transart Institute in Berlin, Germany. She has also worked as a conceptual set and costume designer for theater, most notably for Lincoln Center of the Performing Arts. Dianne Smith currently lives and works in Harlem, New York. She is a frequent exhibitor at Curious Art Gallery and she is always seeking for new forms and new media the likes of drawing, painting, handmade jewellery.

== Selected solo exhibitions ==
- 2012: "Dianne Smith, Surface & Soul", Piedmont Arts, Martinsvlle, Virginia, Curated by Brandon Adams and Dianne Smith. Dianne Smith, s.h.e. Gallery, Boontoon, New Jersey, Curated by Dianne Smith and Kim Saunders.
- 2011: "Syllogisms", RFA Gallery, New York City. Curated by Dianne Smith and Paula Coleman.
- 2006: "Live Artfully", Kalahari, New York City.
- 2005: "My View: A Black Girl's Thoughts On Canvas", Hearne Fine Art, Little Rock, Arkansas. Curated by Garbo Hearne. Dianne Smith, ZZAJ, New York City.
- 2003: "The Duplicity of the Proletariat", UFA Gallery, New York City. Curated by Carol Sims and Lawrence Finney.
- 2002: "Unbroken", UFA Gallery, New York City. Curated by Carol Sims and Lawrence Finney. "Unbroken", Diggs Gallery Winston Salem State University, Winston Salem, North Carolina. Curated by Belinda Tate. "We've Come This Far", Abyssinian Baptist Church, Charity Event, New York City.

== Selected exhibitions ==
- 2014: "I Kan Do Dat, Contemporary Abstract Art", Brooklyn, New York. Curated by Daniel Simmoms and Oshun Layne.
- 2014: "From Africa to Abstract: Journey of a People Through Art and Image", Southampton Cultural Center, Southampton, New York. Curated by Tina Andrews.
- 2013: Curate NYC, On line Exhibition, New York City. Curated by Amanda Hunt.
- 2013: Curate NYC, On line Exhibition, New York City. Curated by Paul Goodwin.
- 2013: Curate NYC, On line Exhibition, New York City. Curated by Betty-Sue Hertz.
- 2012: Together, s.h.e. Gallery, Boontoon, New Jersey, Curated by Kim Saunders.
- 2012: "Romare Bearden: 20th Century American Master" A Project of the Romare Bearden Foundation. Developed and produced by Full Spectrum Experience, Inc, New York City. Curated by Danny Simmons and Brian Tate.
- 2012: Curate NYC, On line Exhibition, New York City. Curated by Lowery Sims.
- 2012: Curate NYC, On line Exhibition, New York City. Curated by
- 2011: "Collaborations: Two Decades of Excellence", The Delta Cultural Center, Helena, Arkansas.
- 2010: Dash Gallery, New York City.
- 2010: Woman's Work: 20 Emerging and Mid-Career Avisca Fine Art, Marrietta, Georgia. "Stand Up II: Individualism in a Collective State", New York City, Tilford Art Group. Curated by Terrell Tilford.
- 2010: "Collaborations: Two Decades of Excellence", South Arkansas Arts Center in El Dorado, Arkansas.
- 2009: "Collaborations: Two Decades of Excellence", Chattanooga African American Museum.
- 2009: Habitat for Artist, New York City.
- 2008: School of Visual Arts Residency Open Studios, New York City. Hearne Fine Art, National Black Fine Art Show, New York City. "Collaborations: Two Decades of Excellence", Pyramid/Hearne Fine Art: 1998–2008, Little Rock, Arkansas. Curated by Garbo Hearn. "Daughters Of The Diaspora", Hearne Fine Art, Little Rock, Arkansas. Curated by Garbo Hearne.
- 2007: Colours Fine Art, National Black Fine Art Show, New York City.
- 2006: "Objects Reinvented", PCOG Gallery, New York, New York. Curated by Paula Coleman. Harmony Designs, Mount Vernon, New York. Abstract Artist, Johnson-Byrd Gallery, New York City. "Abstract Expressionism: A Sublime Experience", West Harlem Art Fund Russ Berrie Medical Science Pavilion, New York City. Curated by Savona Bailey McClain. Colours Fine Art, National Black Fine Art Show, New York City Abstraction, Corridor Gallery, Brooklyn, New York. Tilford Art Group, Los Angeles, California. Curated by Terrell Tilford.
- 2005: Colours Fine Art, National Black Fine Art Show, New York City. Hearne Fine Art, Little Rock, Arkansas. Artjaz Gallery, Philadelphia, Pennsylvania. Arterior, Contemporary African, Caribbean and Latin American Art, Off The Main, New York City.
- 2004: Kenkeleba Gallery, National Black Fine Art Show, New York City. Rongio Gallery, allu'sion, Brooklyn, New York.
- 2003: P.C.O.G. Gallery, New York City. "Represent Too! Celebrating Black Women Visual Artists of the 21st Century", Los Angeles, California. Curated by Terrell Tilford. Rush Fine Arts, New York City. "Unbroken, Celebrating Black History", The Art Center of Northern New Jersey The Art Center of Northern New Jersey, New Milford, New Jersey. National Black Fine Arts Show, UFA Gallery, New York City.
- 2002: "No Greater Love: Abstraction", Jack Tilton Gallery, New York City. "Myriad Eyes, Women in Photography", SUNY Empire State College The Art Center of Northern New Jersey, Metropolitan Center Gallery, New York City. Hearne Fine Art, Little Rock, Arkansas. Curated by Garbo Hearne. "Believe", Fairleigh Dickinson University, Hackensack, New Jersey. Curated by Carol Sims. NAC, Rush Fine Arts, New York City. UFA Gallery, National Black Fine Arts Show, New York City. Museum of Contemporary African Diaspora Arts (MoCADA), Brooklyn, New York.
- 2001: NAC, The Center For Arts & Culture, Skylight Gallery, Brooklyn, New York. Museum of Contemporary African Diaspora Arts (MoCADA), Brooklyn, New York, Gale-Martin Gallery, New York City.
- 2000: UFA Gallery, National Black Fine Arts Show, New York City. "Celebrating Black History Month", The Art Center of Northern New Jersey, New Milford, New Jersey. Celebrating Black History Month, Bergen Regional Medical Center, Paramus, New Jersey. Women in the Arts, Simone's Gallery, Pelham, New York. City Hall, Mount Vernon, New York. COLOR, Chicago Black Fine Arts Show, Gale-Martin Gallery, Chicago, Illinois. Iandor Fine Art, Newark, New Jersey. Curated by Tarin Fuller. UFA Gallery, New York City. Curated by Carol Sims. Gale-Martin Gallery, New York City.

== Selected public art and installations ==
- 2013: "Dazzle, Play Lab", The West Harlem Art Fund, New York City.
- 2013: Public Art, Festival de Artes al Aire Libre, Museo Municipal de Guayaquil - Ecuador, Guayaquil, Ecuador.
- 2013: "No Limits", Harrison Museum of African American Culture, Roanoke, Virginia.
- 2013: "Organic Abstract", The West Harlem Art Fund
- 2012: "Uptown Pops!" The West Harlem Art Fund, Montefiore Park, New York City.
- 2012: "Connections", Select Art Fair, Art Basel Miami, Miami, Florida.
- 2012: "Afro Syllogisms, Transformers: A Coiled Potential", Atelierhof Kreuzberg, Berlin, Germany.
- 2011: "Within Shadows Cast", Piedmont Arts, Martinsvlle, Virginia.
- 2011: "Where Are We Now", Piedmont Arts, Martinsvlle, Virginia.
- 2011: "Loosely Coupled", The West Harlem Art Fund, Governor's Island, New York City.
- 2011: "Gumboot Juba", The West Harlem Art Fund, Armory Arts Week, New York City.
- 2009: "Remix/Repurpose", Park(ing) Day NYC, West Harlem Art Fund, New York City.

== Selected commissions ==
- Abyssinian Baptist Church, New York City, Sponsored by the Bicentennial Anniversary Committee, 2007.

=== Private collections ===
- Dr. Maya Angelou
- George Faison
- Danny Simmons
- Vivica A. Fox
- Rev. Dr. & Mrs. Calvin O. Butts, III
- Cicely Tyson
- Terry McMillan
- Arthur Mitchell
- Carl Hancock Rux
- Tasha Smith

== Bibliography ==
- Zagat Spotlight on Harlem, Clinton Foundation, Other Neighborhood Highlights, Arts and Entertainment, Dianne Smith Arts, 2009/2010.
- Angie Hancock, The Virtuoso Dianne Smith, What's New in Harlem, New York Living Magazine, February/March 2009.
- Elizabeth Fasolino, "Contemporary Lessons", The East Hampton Star, July 2008.
- Dianne Smith, Narrator's View, Lincoln Center Institute, Picasso: What is the Artist's Voice?, 2008.
- Dianne Smith, Narrator's View, Lincoln Center Institute, Mary Whalen: A Night Sonnet So Far, 2007.
- Dianne Smith, Afterword, Collaborations Two Decades of Excellence, Collaborations: Two Decades of African American Art, Hearne Fine Art Catalogue, 2008.
- Open House NYC, NBC, LX-TV, New York City, 2008.
- Lerone D. Wilson and Nonso Christian Ugbod, Boondoggle Films Documentary, Colored Frames, 2006.
- The New York Times, Harlem Celebrates, August 2006.
- Essence Magazine, Living Well Home Special, September 2004.
- Flo Wiley, WCHR-FM-90.3, City College Harlem Community Radio, New York, City, 2003.
- Cheryl Washington, Good Day New York, New York City, 2002.
- Ambrose Clancy, The Washington Post, Life Styles In Harlem, Washington, District of Columbia, 2002.
- Soho Art Journal, New York City, 2002.
- Cheryl Washington, Channel 5 News, New York City, 2002.
- Disappearing Acts, HBO & Adelphi Pictures, 2000
