= Rux Revue =

Studio album by Carl Hancock Rux
- Released: August 31, 1999
- Genres: R&B/Electronic
- Length: 1.01.41
- Label: Sony Music Entertainment

Carl Hancock Rux chronology
Rux Revue (1999)	Apothecary Rx (2004)

Rux Revue is the debut album by Carl Hancock Rux, released by Sony 550 Music which operated through Sony Music's Epic Records division. The album was produced in Los Angeles by the Dust Brothers, featuring drummers Joey Waronker (formerly of R.E.M.) and James Gadson, bassists Atom Ellis (of Link Wray/The New Cars) and Carol Kaye, keyboardist James Hall, bass guitarist Wah-Wah Watson and additional keyboard, Keyboard, Piano and Melodica by Money Mark. The album mixes soul, gospel, blues, rock, classical and hip-hop into a collage of machine samples, drum machines, live instrumentation and sound effects, incorporating a gospel influenced Sprechgesang and Vocalese style reliant upon African American alliteration, consonance and assonance while abstaining from the common techniques of poetic monologue popular in spoken word and slam poetry.

== Critical reception ==
Professional ratings
Review scores
Source	Rating
AllMusic	3/5 stars
Entertainment Weekly	B
PopMatters	8/10 / 9.0/10
Spin	7/10

Rux's album was critically acclaimed. PEOPLE Magazine described the cd as "Merging poetry, hip hop and ambient beats with old-time R&B, this debut album is hypnotic, intense and thought-provoking." POP MATTERS praised Rux's cd, calling it "fully realized effort to present poetry as musical theater. It’s similar in this vein to Charles Mingus’ A Modern Symposium of Jazz and Poetry and The Clown, or Wynton Marsalis’ Blue Interlude and The Majesty of the Blues, or Stevie Wonder’s Living for the City. Backed by a live band and singers, Rux’s sound encompasses rock, blues, jazz, funk, and hip-hop, the words allowed the most fruitful representation in sound. His voice is a rich baritone; he sometimes shouts, sometimes croons, sometimes whispers. At all times he is insistent, a quality we have come to recognize as the hallmark of a performance poet. His work grapples with recalling his past and creating out of it a self-consciousness that is productive, rather than self-pitying. The production quality is excellent, a testament to both the producers (among them Toshi Reagon) and to Rux’s command over his material and his relationship with his band." SPIN Magazine commended Rux by citing "No poet signed to a major label has ever sounded as comfortable with a band as...Carl Hancock Rux" and PLAYBOY magazine stated "There isn't a more beautifully written set of lyrics around than on Rux Revue (Sony), the debut album by Carl Hancock Rux. Rux is a poet. But he's also interested in his musical accompaniment, and while his deep voice will recall Gil Scott-Heron, that isn't his only reference point...."

== Track listing ==
All lyrics are written by Carl Hancock Rux; all music is composed by Carl Hancock Rux, Dust Brothers, Tom Rothrock, Rob Schnapff.

No.	Title	Length
1.	"Intro To Evolution"	3:23
2.	"Asphalt Yards"	5:07
3.	"Gut Bucket Blues"	4:20
4.	"Languid Libretto (I Can't Love You Better)"	5:56
5.	"Miguel"	3:13
6.	"Wasted Seed"	6:44
7.	"Fall Down"	4:38
8.	"Elmina Blues"	6:09
9.	"My Coon Gal"	4:45
10.	"No Black Male Show"	7:42
11.	"Blue Candy"	6:14
12.	"I Recall (There I Am)"	6:02

== Personnel ==
- Carl Hancock Rux (composer, primary artist)
- Fred Davis (legal)
- Mio Vukovic (A&R)
- Steve Cohen (management)
- Dust Brothers (producer)
- Tom Rothrock (producer)
- Rob Schnapff (producer)
- Toshi Reagon (producer)
- Robert William Burke (drums)
- Freddie Cash Bass (electric)
- Marcelle Davies-Lashley (background vocals)
- Helga Davis (background/guest lead vocals)
- Atom Ellis (bass)
- Jason Finkleman (berimbau, percussion)
- James Gadson (drums)
- Carol Kaye (bass)
- James Hall (bass, guitar)
- Wah-Wah Watson (bass guitar)
- Annie King (trumpet)
- John King (bass, programming)
- Ric Mandell (piano)
- Clinton McKinnon (saxophone)
- Money Mark (clavinet, guitar)
- John Nau (keyboards)
- Alejandro Rosso (bass, organ, piano)
- Tom Rothrock (bass, drums, keyboards, programming)
- C.H. Rux (background vocals, programming)
- Jeff Termus (bass)
- Joey Waronker (drums)
