= Pagan Operetta =

Poetry collection by Carl Hancock Rux

- Author: Carl Hancock Rux
- Genre: poetry
- Published: 1998 (Fly by Night Press in association with A Gathering of the Tribes)
- Publication place: USA
- Awards: Village Voice Literary Prize 1999
- ISBN: 9780963958587

Pagan Operetta (1998) is a collection of poetry and experimental prose by Carl Hancock Rux, his first poetry collection. It won the 1999 Village Voice Literary Prize. Rux subsequently adapted one section for stage performance, initially also under the title Pagan Operetta, later as The No Black Male Show.

Loosely inspired by Homer's Odyssey, the collection is structured as a poetic memoir. Rux begins the first section with reflections on his early childhood in foster care after the death of his grandmother, his biological mother's schizophrenia and institutionalization, questions regarding his father's identity, and his adoptive parents' spousal abuse, and concludes it with a surreal short story entitled "Asphalt" (which inspired his novel of the same name) about a boy walking through the ruins of an urban landscape as rose buds blossom from his skin. The second section details a life-changing experience in Ghana, where the protagonist goes to avoid a dying childhood friend and discovers shantytowns and an illiterate teenager who seduces middle-aged tourists and has a sexual encounter with a prostitute that ends badly. The third section is a collection of poems posing socio-political questions, among them the commodification of the tragic black male identity and the challenge facing young writers. In these poems, Rux recalls pondering "black male identity" while watching a play by Anton Chekhov with Cornel West and attending a party seated next to a dying Allen Ginsberg.

== Stage adaptation ==
The section of Pagan Operetta titled "Hell No Won't Be No Black Male Show Shown Today", written in response to a 1994 exhibition at the Whitney Museum titled Black Male Show, was performed by Rux in 1999 at The Kitchen under the title Pagan Operetta and has since been further developed as The No Black Male Show and toured the United States in 2001–02.

== Critical reception ==
Pagan Operetta won the 1999 Village Voice Literary Prize. In 2012, literary critic Marta Werbanowska classified it as a work of the New Black Aesthetics, pointing out that in a break with the tradition of African American literature, such works must be evaluated by taking other considerations beyond ethnicity into account, such as class, gender and sexuality, and religion.
