= Exit Calm =

English indie rock band (2006–2015)

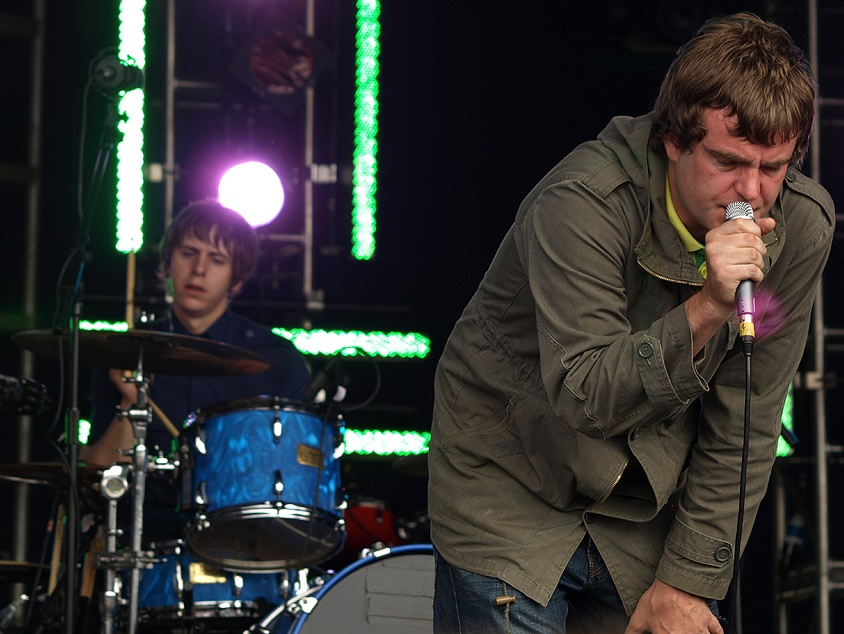

Background information
- Origin: Barnsley, England
- Genres: Indie rock
- Years active: 2006–2015
- Label: Club AC30 / Cooking Vinyl
- Past members: Nicky Smith; Rob Marshall; Scott Pemberton; Simon Lindley
- Website: www.exitcalm.co.uk

Exit Calm were an English indie rock band, formed in Barnsley, South Yorkshire, England, in late 2006. The band was composed of singer Nicky Smith, guitarist Rob Marshall, bassist Simon Lindley and drummer Scott Pemberton.

The band name was inspired by a book called "Silent Rebels" read by Lindley and the band Lunatic Calm.

== History ==
In late 2006, Hull born singer-songwriter Nicky Smith responded to an advertisement in Jumbo Records, Leeds, for a band called Blind Shore who were looking for a frontman. Blind Shore were Rob Marshall, Simon Lindley and Scott Pemberton formerly of Barnsley band Lyca Sleep, who had released a couple of singles via a small independent label. Marshall is originally from Stockton-on-Tees.

The band quickly began writing songs together in rehearsals, with songs With Angels and Always A Way appearing early on. The band signed to London label Club AC30 in late 2007 and released their debut single Higher Learning in February 2008, which sold out on pre-order. The band toured extensively including support slots with The Music and an appearance at Glastonbury Festival and released their second single We're On Our Own in November 2008. The band were set to release their debut album, produced by Matt Terry, shortly after. However, the band's debut album wasn't released until May 2010, preceded by the single Hearts and Minds. The album was recorded at Miloko Studios in Shoreditch, London, and produced by Paddy Byrne and mixed by Ulrich Schnauss. The band toured the album extensively, including support slots with Modest Mouse and Echo & The Bunnymen. The album was followed by the EP Don't Look Down.

In January 2013, the band broke a nearly three-year "self imposed exile" with the release of the single The Rapture. The band then released the single When They Rise in August 2013 and second studio album The Future Isn't What It Used To Be in September 2013. The album was streamed online a week prior to its release exclusively by Clash Music. The band played V Festival in August, with headline tours in September and November. The third and final single from the second album Promise was released in January 2014.

Despite debuting new material (including songs The Veil and Footprints) live in September 2014, the band announced their split on 9 March 2015. The band released a statement, in which they stated that they had parted ways with singer Nicky Smith, and that as a result of this had ended the band. They described their relationship with Smith as having been "a tumultuous one, with a lot of highs and more recently some lows" and said "it takes all members to be in the right headspace to achieve [a third album]... we wish Nicky nothing but success and happiness in all he does... and maybe one day we can all stand on the same stage again".

== Post-split ==
Frontman Nicky Smith performed his first post-split solo gig on 12 September 2015 supporting Daniel Pearson at the Sebright Arms in Bethnal Green, East London.

In February 2017, it was revealed that guitarist Rob Marshall had co-written 6 of the 10 tracks on the forthcoming Mark Lanegan album Gargoyle. In 2020, Marshall released his solo project, Humanist on the Ignition label, with former Exit Calm drummer Scott Pemberton playing drums and featuring the vocals of Mark Lanegan (Queens Of The Stone Age), Joel Cadbury (UNKLE), Dave Gahan (Depeche Mode) Jim Jones (Jim Jones Revue / Thee Hypnotics), Carl Hancock Rux and Ron Sexsmith to name a few.

== Members ==
- Nicky Smith - Vocals
- Rob Marshall - Guitars
- Simon Lindely - Bass
- Scott Pemberton - Drums

== Discography ==
Albums

- Exit Calm (2010)
- The Future Isn't What It Used To Be (2013)

Singles

- "Higher Learning" / "Awake" (2008)
- "We're On Our Own" / "Atone (Acoustic Version)" (2008)
- "Hearts And Minds" / "Before Tomorrow" (2010)
- "The Rapture" / "A Lonely Port" (2013)
- "When They Rise" / "Higher Bound (Room Version)" (2013)
- "Promise" / "Alarms (One Way Road)" (2014)

EPs

- Don't Look Down (2010)
