= Talk (play) =

2002 play written by Carl Hancock Rux

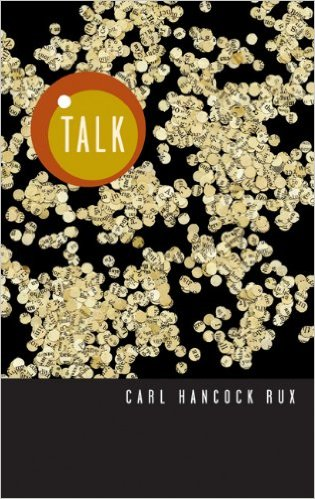
- Author: Carl Hancock Rux
- Language: English
- Genre: Drama
- Publisher: TCG
- Publication date: 2003
- ISBN: 978-1559362269

Talk is a play written by Carl Hancock Rux, commissioned and premiered by The Foundry Theatre (Melanie Joseph, Artistic Producer) at the Joseph Papp Public Theater/New York Shakespeare Festival in 2002. The play was directed by Marion McClinton, with set by James Noone, costumes by Toni-Leslie James, lighting by James L. Vermeulen, sound by Tim Schellenbaum and projections by Marilys Ernst.

== Characters ==
- Moderator
- Apollodoros
- Ion
- Phaedo
- Crito
- Meno

== Synopsis and themes ==
The play explores themes of mixed race as both an aesthetic challenge and a social concern, gesturing toward a poetics of social justice for the “mulatto millennium” as well as art as both social memory and cultural production. Influenced by Euripides' play The Bacchae, the entire play is held in the ruins of a museum of Greek antiquities, and has characters inspired by the Socratic dialogues (Phaedo, Crito, Meno, Apollodorus, and Ion) written by Plato, which attempts to determine the definition of virtue and the meaning of art. TALK also delves heavily in theoretical arguments regarding the reading of performativity as interdisciplinary concepts by examining the works of André Breton, Clay Felker, Mark Van Doren, Jonas Mekas, James Baldwin, Wayne Shorter, Jack Kerouac, Maya Deren and Robert Giroux (among others) with clips from an alleged unfinished experimental film ( heavily influenced by the French New Wave and Maya Deren's expressionism) [1]made by Aymes, shown and narrated by Phaedo, one of his collaborators.

== Set ==
The impressionistic set was designed to resemble a panel discussion held in the interior hall on the ground floor of a Victorian mansion converted into (the now-defunct) Museum of Antiquities. Center stage there is a large triclinium (a three-sided table) set with food and wine, similar to the setting of a symposium In ancient Greece (Greek: συμπόσιον symposion, from συμπίνειν sympinein, "to drink together"), a Hellenistic social institution and forum for esteemed men to debate, plot, boast, revel with others and to celebrate the introduction of young men into aristocratic society.

== Plot ==
The play takes the form of a heated panel discussion regarding the enigmatic identity of the post-modernist novelist/experimental filmmaker, Archer Aymes.

== Prologue ==
A woman (Apollodoros) exhibits to the audience ancient Greek amphora painted with scenes from The Bacchae, and introduces the architectural history of the play's setting (the Museum of Antiquities), alluding to the death of an unidentified woman some years earlier. The Moderator proceeds to read an excerpt from Mother and Son, a "novel by Archer Aymes", then welcomes the audience into the "curious room of forgetting what had been remembered" (both a complaint about forgetfulness, since the play revolves remembering a forgotten artist and a call to action that requires letting go of moribund or memorialized Truths). The Moderator introduces five invited panelists who knew Archer Aymes, (Ion, Crito, Ion, Meno, Phaedo and one uninvited guest, Apollodorus, who unexpectedly insists she be included as a participant in the conference even though she elects to sit apart from the others, quietly observing and occasionally interrupting the proceedings with remarks of intentional ambiguity as she serves food and wine to the panelists.)

== Act One ==
During the course of the play, the Moderator interviews each panelist. He learns from Meno, an aging television talk show host, that Archer Aymes, a Columbia University graduate, became an overnight literary sensation for his first book, an experimental novel titled Mother and Son, published during the McCarthy era. Closely affiliated with the Beat poets, and openly associated with the Communist Party, Aymes was initially uncomfortable with his newfound fame, using it as a platform to express his Marxist class politics, social reformism and to assert himself as an African American (though initially perceived to have been white). Failing to author another book, the author quickly faded into obscurity, and ten years later, during the turbulent 60s, was formally charged with inciting a riot after encouraging a horde of angry protesters to destroy The Museum of Antiquities in Manhattan. Before he could be brought to trial, Aymes was found dead in his jail cell, a death that authorities characterized as suicide and remains refuted by several panel members.

Disrupting the panel, Apollodoros suggests Aymes never went to Columbia University, nor was he a member of the Beat Generation; insisting Aymes actually decided to write experimental literature after meeting the poet turned homeless panhandler Maxwell Bodenheim. Once known as the King of Greenwich Village Bohemians during the Jazz Age of the 1920s, Bodenheim allowed Aymes to engage in a sexual affair with his wife Ruth (28 years her husband's junior) who shared her husband's derelict lifestyle and often worked as a prostitute, and it was Bodenheim who first introduced him to poetry. The relationship with the couple was cut short around 1954 when Bodenheim and his wife were famously murdered by a dishwasher with whom they shared a room in a flophouse at 97 Third Avenue in Manhattan, New York City.

== Act Two ==
Arguing the absurdity of the earlier Bodenheim claim and assertions of her fellow panelists, Phaedo ( film historian, as well as Aymes' former student and lover) gives an artist lecture/ film screening of Mother and Son, the short experimental film she and Archer Aymes adapted from his novel in the 1960s. Citing the influences of Maya Deren, Jonas Mekas and Len Lye, she argues Aymes had in fact "moved on" from writing novels to creating "visual novels", as a continuum of his artistic expression. During this sequence, Apollodoros recalls living in the East Village of Manhattan where she had a chance encounter with a down and out Archer Aymes, after which an intimate relationship between them was formed. Crito, a prolific jazz musician claims to have titled his first album "Mother and Son" after meeting Aymes in a Mississippi Delta jail cell after they'd both been arrested as participants in Martin Luther King Jr.'s Poor People's Campaign, a broad approach for addressing the extensive poverty within America's own borders. Ion claims neither Aymes nor Crito participated in the march but actually met in a jail cell in Marks. Mississippi where they were being held for drunken and disorderly conduct. Meno reveals he'd optioned the film rights of Aymes' novel and invited him on his television show to discuss the story, but Aymes' televised appearance was a disaster due to the author's drunken incoherence. Defending his claim to Aymes, Crito admits upon their release from jail, he drove Aymes to a former cotton plantation somewhere in Mississippi where Aymes took up residence with an elderly African American woman. Upon this revelation, Phaedo admits the film widely believed to have been solely directed by Aymes, was actually directed and edited by her because Aymes had abandoned the completion of the project.

When the subject returns to Aymes' riot in New York City, Apollodoros informs the panel (and the audience) that the place they are in at present is in fact what remains of The Museum of Antiquities, a Victorian Gothic mansion commissioned in the early 20th century by "Sir Norman Victor". Initially designed by James Renwick Jr., a highly successful American architect in the 19th century (dissemblingly identified in the footnotes as a self-taught "African American architect") whose father was a professor of natural philosophy at Columbia College (now Columbia University); the house was completed by one of Britain’s most eminent ecclesiastical architects, Richard Norman Shaw, whose revisions to the original design addressed infelicities of style. After the death of its owners, and some 50 years after its completion, the mansion was bequeathed to the National Organization for the Preservation of Antiquities Society, and converted into The Museum of Antiquities. Its gallery once housed one of the most comprehensive collections of antiquities from the Classical world, with over 100,000 objects ranging in date from the beginning of the Greek Bronze Age (about 3200 BC) to the reign of the Roman emperor Constantine in the fourth century AD, with some pagan survivals as well as the Cycladic, Minoan and Mycenaean cultures and the Greek collection, including important sculpture from the Parthenon in Athens, as well as elements of two of the Seven Wonders of the Ancient World, the Mausoleum at Halikarnassos and the Temple of Artemis at Ephesos. Apollodorus further explains in the aftermath of a radical and violent protest during the late 1960s (spearheaded by Archer Aymes and resulting in the death of an unidentified woman) the museum permanently shuttered its doors. She further alludes to a rumor that the former occupant of the house, Sir Norman Victor, may have engaged in an extramarital affair with one of his twenty servants, an African American girl who is said to have been dismissed and returned to her hometown somewhere in the rural South where she gave birth to her illegitimate mixed-race son. Phaedo suddenly recalls a night Archer Aymes took her on a walk through Manhattan and broke into a boarded-up mansion, after which he had one of a series of nervous breakdowns. Ion, a journalist who has exposed most of the other panelists as liars and plagiarists, suggests Aymes was not an African American at all, but a white man posing as an African American.

== Coda ==
Disillusioned with the perceived lies and deception of the panelists, the Moderator dismisses the panel and is left only with Apollodoros, who asks the Moderator to connect to what initially attracted him to the novel of Aymes. When he admits his frustration with art and the academy, she ritualistically leads him through a recreation of the night Aymes leads a group of protestors to the Museum of Antiquities when an unidentified woman threw herself from the upper balcony. Having discovered "the truth" of Aymes' book, the play ends with the Moderator alone on stage reading the last page of the novel.

== Production history ==
The play was originally commissioned by The Foundry Theatre in New York City, conceived as a response to A Conversation on Hope, a Foundry community dialogue held at The Great Hall of The Cooper Union, in 1998, hosted by Cornel West. The event brought together 300 artists and public thinkers, to improvise a performance of ideas; to engage in a series of creative conversations and encounters exploring notions of hope and its impact on the actions and politics of everyday life. The play was further workshopped at the Sundance Institute in Utah before its premiere at the Joseph Papp Public Theater, (produced by the Foundry Theatre, Melanie Joseph, producing, artistic director). It was later produced at Theatre X, in Milwaukee, Wisconsin, in Jan. 2003, directed by David Ravel with scenic and lighting design by Stephen Hudson-Mairet, and costume design by Amy Horst; as well as Brown University's Leeds Theater, in Providence, Rhode Island, in 2011, directed by Erik Ehn.

== In print ==
Theatre Communications Group published the script. For the book edition, Rux included an index, endnotes, and footnotes in the document body, indicated in-text by superscript Arabic numbers after the punctuation of the phrase or clause to which the note refers. Each endnote attempts to offer some background to both real and fictional characters and events mentioned throughout the play, particularly as it relates to definitive artistic movements and sociopolitical events in America during the post–World War II era and the unrest of 1960s counterculture. Talk began stocking in stores July 1, 2003.

== Critical Response ==
"Rux, a breathlessly inventive multimedia artist, makes a thrilling entrance ...with Talk an impressionistic puzzle box of a play about art, race, memory and power. Talk took a panel discussion as its form, inhabiting and deconstructing its rituals." (Alexis Solowski/New York Times)

"The titular commodity in Talk,...is in such ample supply that the title feels both apt and insufficient, both unimaginatively obvious and wryly understated...remarkably, this original, provocative and entertaining play almost makes it to the end of its three-hour span without itself becoming pompous or overwrought...Indeed Talk,...is notable for its ambition alone. Among the issues it takes on are the usefulness of the literary canon and of the publishing establishment to the black writer, the corrupting influence of celebrity on intellectualism, and the elusiveness of history. Emotionally speaking, Mr. Rux concentrates on attachments -- those that course through family bloodlines and those that don't." (Ben Brantley/New York Times)

== Original cast ==
- Anthony Mackie (The Moderator)
- Karen Kandel (Apollodorus)
- Maria Tucci ( Phaedo)
- James Himelsbach (Ion)
- John Seitz (Meno)
- Reg E. Cathey (Crito)
