= Shark Beach with Anthony Mackie: Gulf Coast =

- Genre: TV documentary
- Directed by: Matt Kay
- Starring: Anthony Mackie, Brett Ryan, Jasmin Graham
- Music by: Roahn Hylton, Jacob Yoffee
- No. of episodes: 1

Production
- Production location: New Orleans
- Editor: Kel McKeown
- Production company: National Geographic

Original release
- Network: NatGeo
- Release: July 1, 2024

Shark Beach with Anthony Mackie: Gulf Coast is an American television documentary that follows actor Anthony Mackie, who grew up fishing in the waterways of New Orleans, as he investigates the rising rumors of increased shark encounters in the Gulf of Mexico. Joined by a team of shark experts, he delves into the latest scientific research aimed at fostering coexistence between humans and sharks in Louisiana.

The show premiered on July 1, 2024 during NatGeo's "Sharkfest" and was available for streaming on Disney+ and Hulu the next day.

== See also ==
- Gulf of Mexico
- Shark
- National Geographic
