= Carl Hancock Rux =

American multi-genre writer, and multimedia artist and performer

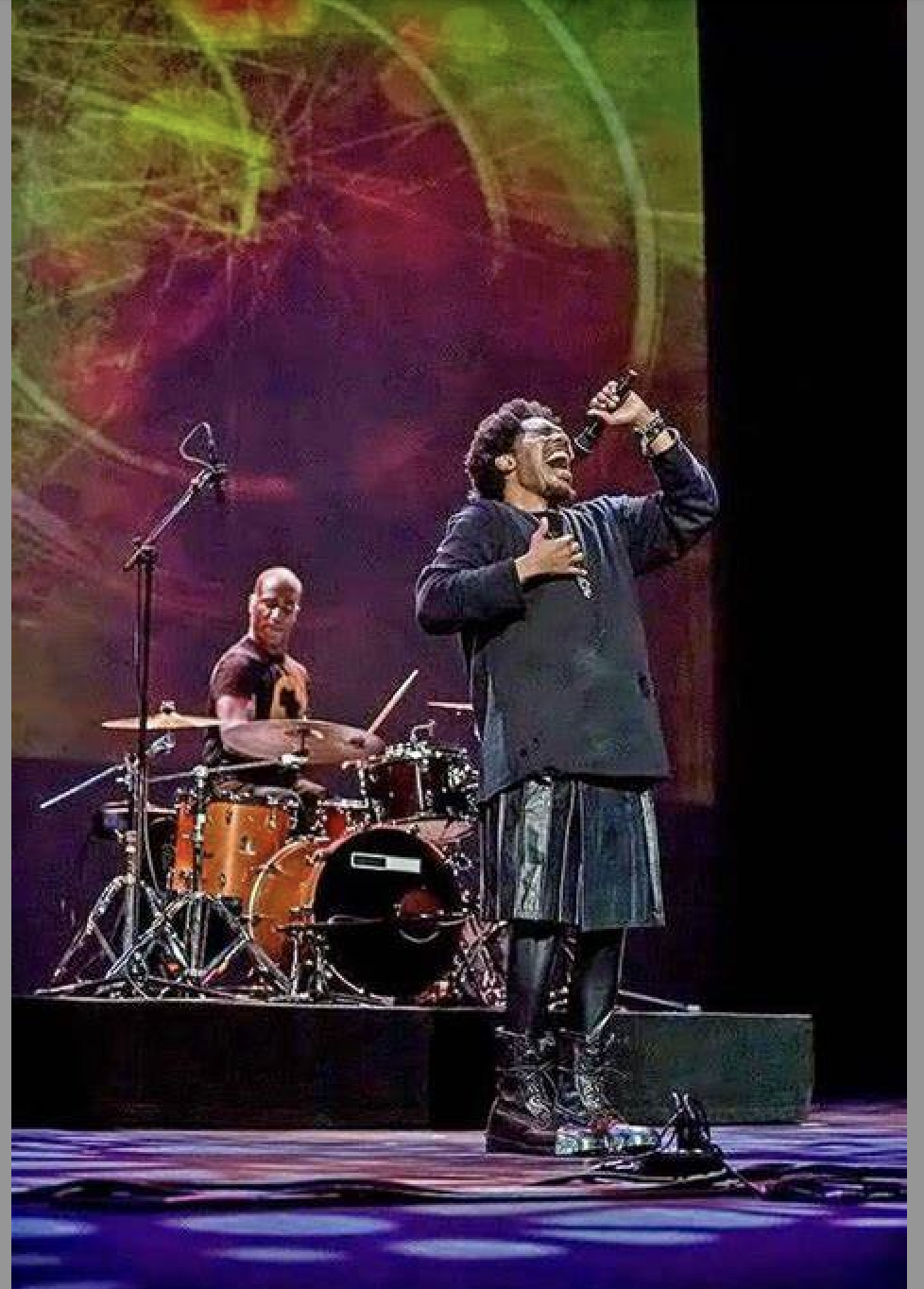
- Carl Hancock Rux in concert, Paris, France, 2018
- Born: Carl Stephen Hancock; New York City, U.S.
- Occupations: playwright; poet; novelist; essayist; singer-songwriter; director; actor; visual artist; journalist/radio; artistic director
- Writing career
- Years active: 1989–present
- Notable works: Asphalt, Rux Revue, Talk, Pagan Operetta, Good Bread Alley, Apothecary Rx
- Notable awards: Alpert Award in the Arts, NYFA Prize, Village Voice Literary prize, Obie Award, Bessie Award
- Website: www.carlhancockrux.com

Carl Hancock Rux (/ˈrʌks/) is an American poet, playwright, singer-songwriter, novelist, and essayist, as well as an installation artist working in diverse multimedia. His work includes sound and image installation, photography, and performative lectures. He is the author of a collection of poetry, Pagan Operetta; a novel, Asphalt; and the play Talk. Rux has been published as a contributing writer in numerous journals, catalogs, anthologies, and magazines, including Interview magazine, Essence magazine, the New York Times, the Los Angeles Times, Iké Udé's aRude Magazine, Nka: Journal of Contemporary African Art (founded by fellow art critics Okwui Enwezor, Chika Okeke-Agulu and Salah Hassan) and American Theatre (magazine), among others. Rux's writings and monographs on visual art include essays on the work of conceptual artist Glenn Ligon ( I Stand in My Place With My Own Day Here: Site-Specific Art at The New School, edited by Frances Richards with a foreword by Lydia Matthews and introduction by Silvia Rocciolo and Erik Stark); the introduction for Nick Cave’s Until; and the Guggenheim Museum’s Carrie Mae Weems retrospective.

Rux is also a singer-songwriter who has released several albums, singles, and mixtapes since his major-label debut, Rux Revue, released by Sony 550 Music. His recording career has encompassed jazz, electronic music, rock,experimental music. Among his most notable collaborators are electronic musicians DJ Spooky, Jeff Mills, David Holmes, Geoff Barrow of Portishead, and Afrobeat drummer Tony Allen; rock musicians Nona Hendryx, Vernon Reid, Meshell Ndegeocello, and Rob Marshall (formerly of Exit Calm); and jazz artists Randy Weston, Mal Waldron, Leroy Jenkins, Gerald Clayton, and James Brandon Lewis.

Trained as a visual artist, Rux's mixed media works (with frequent collaborator, visual artist and sculptor, Dianne Smith) have been included in the Uptown Triennale at the Miriam and Ira D. Wallach Art Gallery; as well as Park Avenue Armory. He is a recurrent collaborator with artist Carrie Mae Weems on several of her live performance exhibitions, presented at the Spoleto Festival USA, Yale Repertory Theater, London's Serpentine Gallery, the Frieze Art Fair, the Kennedy Center and other venues.

Rux has held faculty positions at notable institutions including Brown University, The New School for Social Research, Yale University, The University of Iowa and is the former Head of the MFA Writing for Performance Program at CalArts.

Rux is co-artistic director of Mabou Mines, special guest resident artist at Lincoln Center for the Performing Arts (where annually he conceives and stages its campus-wide Juneteenth festival) former multidisciplinary editor at The Massachusetts Review.,), and the former associate artistic director at Harlem Stage The Gate House.

== Early life ==
Born Carl Stephen Hancock in East Harlem, Rux's mother, Carol Jean Hancock (1933–2002), was an unwed teenager when she was diagnosed with schizophrenia shortly after the birth of her first child (Rux's older brother). While institutionalized in a state-operated long-stay psychiatric hospital for adults with extreme mental health disorders, doctors discovered Rux's mother had once again become pregnant. Due to the severity of her illness, his mother was unable to give anyone information regarding Rux's conception or the identity of his biological father (on Rux's original birth certificate, the names of his biological mother and maternal grandmother, Geneva Hancock née Rux, are the only parental names listed.)

Rux was immediately taken into custody by his grandmother, a divorcee, who lived in a one-bedroom East Harlem pre-war tenement apartment in which she had grown up and, at various times, shared with four younger siblings, her ex-husband, two daughters, and four grandchildren (Rux's grandmother and her siblings had been abandoned by their own mother sometime during the Great Depression). When Rux was still a toddler, police officers discovered Rux alone in the apartment with his grandmother's corpse, already in the early stages of decomposition. Her death was subsequently attributed to cirrhosis of the liver due to acute alcohol poisoning.

Transferred to Foster Care, Rux lived with several families before he eventually became the ward of his granduncle, James Henry Rux (1915–1994), a furrier and decorated World War II veteran, and his wife Arsula Rux (née Cottrell). The couple legally adopted him at the age of 15 and changed his name to Carl S. Hancock Rux, raising him in the Highbridge section of the Bronx.

== Career ==
=== Poetry, Plays, Novel ===
While working as a New York City Social Work Trainer, Rux began his artistic career as a playwright and, later, a spoken word and performance artist. Influenced by the Lower East Side poetry and experimental theater scene, Rux worked with artists including Sekou Sundiata, Laurie Carlos, Robbie McCauley, Jane Comfort, and Urban Bush Women, creating work primarily at Performance Space 122, Judson Church, St. Mark's Church in-the-Bowery, The Kitchen, Threadwaxing Space and the Nuyorican Poets Cafe. and is featured in the poetry anthology Aloud, Voices From the Nuyorican Poets Cafe, (winner of the 1994 American Book Award).

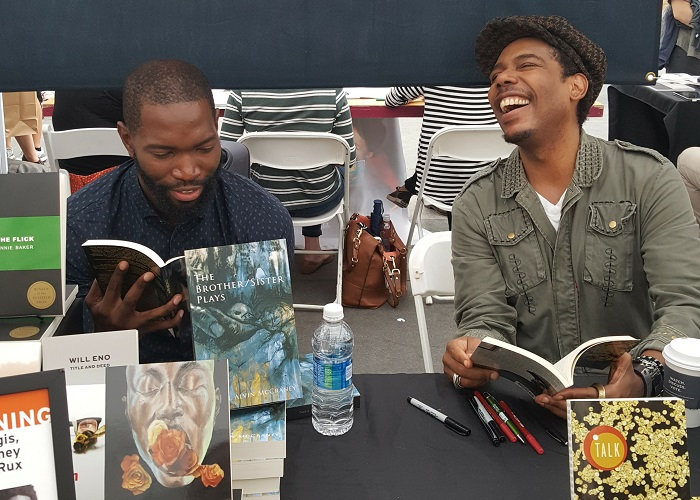
Carl Hancock Rux and Tarell Alvin McCraney book signing at Brooklyn Book Festival

Rux's first book of poetry, Pagan Operetta, received the Village Voice Literary prize and was featured on the weekly's cover story: "Eight Writers on the Verge of (Impacting) the Literary Landscape." Rux is the author of the novel Asphalt and the author of several plays, including the Obie award-winning play Talk (published by TCG), which premiered at the Joseph Papp Public Theater (co-produced by the Foundry Theater and the Joseph Papp Public Theater/nat'l tour); Song of Sad Young Men (Producer's Club Theater/nat'l tour); Smoke Lilies and Jade (Center for New Performance); No Black Male Show (The Kitchen/nat'l tour), and many others.

"There is something called black in America, and there is something called white in America, and I know them when I see them, but I will forever be unable to explain the meaning of them, because they are not real, even though they have a very real place in my daily way of seeing, a fundamental relationship to my ever-evolving understanding of history and a critical place in my relationship to humanity."

— Carl Hancock Rux

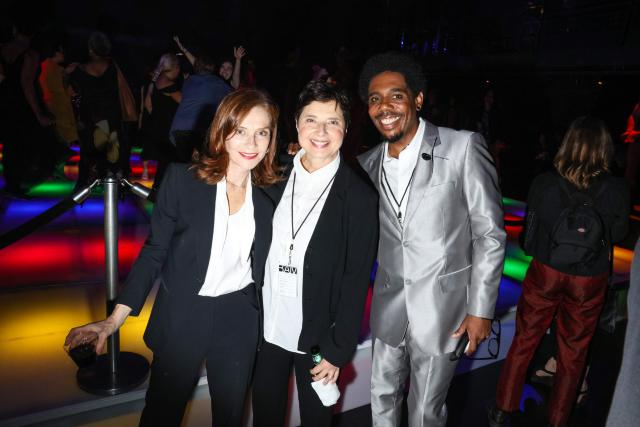
Isabelle Huppert, Isabella Rossellini and Carl Hancock Rux after their appearance in Hey Joe... directed by Robert Wilson for Joe Melillo at Brooklyn Academy of Music afterparty

=== Dance, Performance Art, Opera ===
Rux has written, performed, and or collaborated with numerous artists in the field of dance, including works by the Alvin Ailey American Dance Theater; Bill T. Jones/Arnie Zane Dance Company, Jane Comfort & Co., Ronald K. Brown's Evidence, Urban Bush Women, Paz Tanjiquio's Topaz Arts, Marlies Yearby's Movin' Spirits Dance Theatre, Robert Moses Kin, and others. He also originated the title role in the folk opera production of The Temptation of St. Anthony, based on the Gustave Flaubert novel, directed by Robert Wilson with book, libretto, and music by Bernice Johnson Reagon and costumes by Geoffrey Holder. The production had its official "world premiere" at the Paris Opera, becoming the first opera composed by an African American woman and performed on its stage since the inauguration of the Académie Nationale de Musique - Théâtre de l'Opéra. The Village Voice described Rux's performance as having "phenomenal charisma and supreme physical expressiveness...(achieving) a near-iconic power, equally evoking El Greco's saints in extremis and images of civil rights protesters besieged by fire hoses." Rux has also performed throughout Europe, West Africa, and Southeast Asia as a solo artist as well as a collaborator with artists including Vernon Reid, Toshi Reagon, Nona Hendryx, Carrie Mae Weems, the Alvin Ailey Dance Theater and Urban Bush Women.

=== Radio ===
Rux was the host and artistic programming director of the WBAI radio show, Live from The Nuyorican Poets Cafe; contributing correspondent for XM radio's The Bob Edwards Show and frequent guest host on WNYC as well as NPR. He co-wrote and performed in the national touring production of NPR Presents Water±, directed by Kenny Leon, and was also the co-writer and host of the WNYC documentary "Walt Whitman: Song of Myself", awarded the New York Press Club Journalism Award for Entertainment News, and broadcast annually since 2005.

=== Recording Artist ===
Discovered by Sony 550 President Polly Anthony, Rux released his debut CD Rux Revue recorded and produced in Los Angeles by the Dust Brothers, Tom Rothrock, and Rob Schnapf. Rux recorded a follow-up album, Apothecary Rx, selected by French writer Phillippe Robert in the 2008 publication "Great Black Music": a tribute of 110 American albums by African American artists. His third studio CD, Good Bread Alley, was released by Thirsty Ear Records, and his fourth, "Homeostasis" (CD Baby), was released in May 2013. He has also released a mixed tape of a live performance at Joe's Pub, "Anima/Animus". Rux's music has been produced in close collaboration with artists including Tony Allen (former musical director for Fela Kuti); British rock musicians Rob Marshall of The Humanists, Belfast-born DJ, and music producer David Holmes; electronica producer Geoff Barrow of Portishead, French-born house music DJ François Kevorkian, Chicago dance music DJ Ron Trent, Japanese house music DJ Yukihiro Fukutomi, and electronic, experimental hip-hop musician, DJ Spooky among others, resulting in an eclectic blend of alternative music covering a wide range of genres.

=== Labels ===
- Sony (550 Music)
- Giant Step Records
- Thirsty Ear
- CD Baby
- JP Live
- Ignition Records
- Motema Music

=== Opera ===
Rux has written the book and libretto for several operas including Why Don't Girls Wear Pearls Anymore? by Pulitzer Prize-nominated Israeli composer Tamar Muskal; Mackandal by Haitian Cuban composer Yosvany Terry; and several works by American composers including Blackamoor Angel by Deidre Murray; Steel Hammer by Julia Wolfe (2010 Pulitzer Prize finalist); and Swann by Tamar-kali.

== Discography ==
=== Main artist releases ===
| Year | Title | Type | Label | Notes |
|---|---|---|---|---|
| c. 1996 | Cornbread, Cognac & Collard Green (R)evolution | Album (unreleased) | — | Early debut project produced by Nona Hendryx and Mark Batson; frequently cited in artist biographies though not commercially released |
| 1999 | Rux Revue | Studio album | Sony 550 Music | Debut commercial album |
| 2000 | Intro to (R)Evolution / Asphalt Yards | Single | Giant Step | Issued on CD and 12" vinyl |
| 2000 | Remixes | EP | Giant Step | Remix EP derived from Rux Revue material |
| 2001 | Lamentations (You, Son) | 12" single | Giant Step | Vinyl-only release |
| 2004 | Apothecary Rx | Studio album | Giant Step | International release; some territories list 2003 |
| 2006 | Good Bread Alley | Studio album | Thirsty Ear Recordings | Includes “My Brother’s Hands (Union Song)” and “Thadius Star” |
| 2013 | Homeostasis | Studio album | Independent | Features collaborations with Martha Redbone |
| 2020 | Anima / Animus | Live album | Independent | Recorded live at Joe’s Pub |

---

=== Guest appearances and collaborations ===
| Year | Artist | Release | Track(s) | Role |
|---|---|---|---|---|
| 1995 | Reg E. Gaines | Sweeper Don’t Clean My Streets | — | Guest appearance / spoken-word contribution |
| 2000 | David Holmes | Bow Down to the Exit Sign | “Living Room”; “Slip Your Skin” | Featured vocals |
| 2000 | Yukihiro Fukutomi | I Am (single) | “I Am” | Spoken-word vocals (Beat Poets) |
| 2002 | DJ Spooky (with Matthew Shipp) | Optometry | “Asphalt (Tome II)” | Spoken-word vocals |
| 2003–2004 | Bernice Johnson Reagon / Robert Wilson | The Temptation of St. Anthony | — | Originated the role of St. Anthony; performance documentation exists |
| 2010 | David Holmes | The Dogs Are Parading | “Living Room (Kevin Shields Remix)” | Featured vocals |
| 2013 | Gerald Clayton | Life Forum | “A Life Forum” | Spoken-word voice |
| 2017 | Gerald Clayton | Tributary Tales | “Lovers Reverie”; “Dimensions-Interwoven” | Spoken-word / voice |
| 2018 | Tony Allen & Jeff Mills | Tomorrow Comes the Harvest | “The Night Watcher” | Vocals |
| 2019 | Humanist | “Ring of Truth” (single / EP) | “Ring of Truth” | Featured vocals; songwriter |
| 2020 | Humanist | Humanist | “Ring of Truth” | Featured vocals; songwriter |
| 2020 | Humanist | Humanist | “Mortal Eyes” | Featured vocals; songwriter |
| 2024 | Humanist | On the Edge of a Lost and Lonely World | “The Beginning” | Featured vocals; songwriter |

---

=== Production and songwriting credits ===
| Year | Artist | Release | Track(s) | Credit |
|---|---|---|---|---|
| 2003 | Stephanie McKay | McKay | “How Long” | Songwriter; publishing administered through performing rights organizations (ASCAP/BMI) |
| 2003 | Stephanie McKay | McKay | “Thadius Star” | Songwriter; publishing administered through performing rights organizations (ASCAP/BMI) |
| 2019 | Humanist | “Ring of Truth” (single / EP) | “Ring of Truth” | Songwriter and featured vocalist; publishing registered with performing rights organizations |
| 2020 | Humanist | Humanist | “Ring of Truth” | Songwriter and featured vocalist; publishing registered with performing rights organizations |
| 2020 | Humanist | Humanist | “Mortal Eyes” | Songwriter and featured vocalist; publishing registered with performing rights organizations |
| 2024 | Humanist | On the Edge of a Lost and Lonely World | “The Beginning” | Songwriter and featured vocalist; publishing registered with performing rights organizations |

---

=== Notes ===
- Release years may vary slightly by territory due to staggered international distribution.
- Songwriting and publishing credits are derived from liner notes, label metadata, and performing rights organization registrations.
- Some early collaborations are documented through interviews and archival materials rather than consistently published liner notes.

== Activism ==
Rux testified in the case of Jonathan 'Demetrius' Norman, a Portland Oregan gang member, rapping under the name of Smurf Luciano, accused of running cocaine for a local drugpin. During the six-week trial, prosecutors argued that the lyrics to Norman's "No Deal," which included a reference to "packing heat" and criticized Portland's district attorney, were proof that Norman was a criminal. Rux, testifying as an expert witness for the defense, said listeners of hip-hop shouldn't assume that rappers live the lives they rap about, any more than listeners of country music should assume Johnny Cash actually shot a man in Reno just to watch him die. At the end of the trial, the rapper was acquitted of charges of conspiracy to distribute narcotics.

Rux has committed himself to raising awareness of child abuse, the need for child protective services, and the importance of understanding socio-economic contexts concerning drug use, poor living conditions, limited access to education and employment in poverty-stricken neighborhoods and housing characteristics that may influence drug-related behaviors and levels of child abuse.

Rux joined New Yorkers Against Fracking, organized by singer Natalie Merchant, and featuring Citizen Cope, Mark Ruffalo, Meshell Ndegeocello, Toshi Reagon and Tamar-kali calling for a fracking ban on natural gas drilling using hydraulic fracturing.

Rux worked with the Fort Greene Association, New York philanthropist Barbaralee Diamonstein-Spielvogel and Commissioner Laurie Cumbo (then councilwoman of the 35th District of New York City) to erect a cultural medallion at the Carlton Avenue home where novelist Richard Wright lived and penned his seminal work, Native Son.

== Awards and recognition ==
Rux is the recipient of numerous awards, including the New York Foundation for the Arts Prize, the Doris Duke Award for New Works, the Herb Alpert Award in the Arts, the Bessie Schomburg Award, and in 2020, he was named a Global Change Maker by Change.Org. He appeared on the cover of the Village Voice for their 'Writer's On the Verge" issue; featured on the cover of the New York Times Magazine as well as in their "Thirty Writer Under Thirty Most Likely to..." feature; and appeared on the cover of American Theater magazine (with playwright Tony Kushner).

== Family history ==
Rux is a descendent of Marcellus Carlyle Rux (1882–1948), former Baptist minister, and principal of the Bluestone Harmony Academic and Industrial School in Keysville, Virginia. He served for many years as the auditor and statistical secretary of the Negro Baptist General Association of Virginia and as a member of the Lott Carey Baptist Foreign Mission Convention. A licensed minister at Rehobeth Baptist Church, he also served as former pastor of Mt. Olive Baptist Church, the First Baptist Church at South Boston, Virginia, and the Mt. Ellis Baptist Church at Keysville, Virginia.

His cousin, Shawn Rux, is Deputy Chancellor of the New York City Department of Education.

Carl Hancock Rux is of Nigerian, Ghanaian, German, Scandinavian, and Tunisian ancestry.

== Archives ==
Rux's archives are housed at the Billy Rose Theater Division of the New York Public Library, the Archives of American Art, the Smithsonian Institution, and the Film and Video/Theater and Dance Library of the California Institute of the Arts.
