= Backspacer Tour =

2009–10 concert tour by Pearl Jam

- Tour by Pearl Jam
- Location: Europe; North America; Oceania
- Associated album: Backspacer
- Start date: August 13, 2009
- End date: July 10, 2010
- Legs: 6
- No. of shows: 33 in North America; 16 in Europe; 7 in Oceania; 56 in total

Pearl Jam concert chronology
- 2008 United States Tour (2008); Backspacer Tour (2009–10); Pearl Jam Twenty Tour (2011)

The Backspacer Tour was a concert tour by the American rock band Pearl Jam to support its ninth studio album, Backspacer (2009). Fifty-six shows were played, across North America, Europe and Oceania.

== History ==
Pearl Jam promoted Backspacer with tours in Europe, North America and Oceania in 2009 and further legs in North America and Europe in 2010.

In August 2009, Pearl Jam headlined the Outside Lands Music and Arts Festival, which was preceded by five shows in Europe and three in North America. This tour preceded the release of Pearl Jam's 2009 album, Backspacer. On August 11, 2009, the band played an intimate show at the Shepherd's Bush Empire in London. The band was joined onstage by The Rolling Stones guitarist Ronnie Wood to play a cover of "All Along the Watchtower". Later that night the band was joined by Simon Townshend, younger brother of Pete Townshend, to perform The Who's "The Real Me".

On August 21, 2009, the band played in Toronto. Ted Leo and the Pharmacists were scheduled to be the support band, but Leo was unable to attend, after being stuck at the border. This resulted in vocalist Eddie Vedder taking to the stage to cover Neil Young's "Sugar Mountain" and "The Needle and the Damage Done". Guitarist Mike McCready then played two songs, followed by guitarist Stone Gossard covering "You Can't Put Your Arms Around a Memory" by Johnny Thunders, before The Pharmacists played their set.

In October 2009, Pearl Jam headlined the Austin City Limits Music Festival. The Austin City Limits appearance took place amidst the fourteen-date North American leg of the tour. On October 6, 2009, the band played in Los Angeles at the Gibson Amphitheatre. They were joined onstage by former Soundgarden frontman Chris Cornell to perform the Temple of the Dog song "Hunger Strike". This was followed with an appearance by Alice In Chains guitarist Jerry Cantrell on "Alive".

Pearl Jam was the final band that performed at the Wachovia Spectrum with four shows that took place on October 27–28 and October 30–31. At the final show at the Spectrum, the band played the song "Bugs" from their 1994 album Vitalogy for the first time. The band also performed a cover of Devo's "Whip It" in full costume. An additional leg consisting of a tour of Oceania took place afterward. The band played at the New Orleans Jazz & Heritage Festival on May 1, 2010. They then played twelve dates in America in the same month and completed a second European leg in July 2010.

While most shows on the 2010 US leg were met with positive reviews, Dan Aquilante of the New York Post commenting on the first night at Madison Square Garden, said the lyrics were "mostly indiscernible" and "were little more than garbled jibber-jabber". At the show at the O_{2} in Dublin, a fan broke his arm in three places, after he jumped off the balcony and landed on the canopy above the mixing desk.

Official bootlegs are available for this tour through the band's official website in FLAC, MP3, and CD formats.

== Opening acts ==
- Gomez — 2009 European leg (excluding August 11)
- The Pharmacists — August 21, 2009
- Bad Religion — August 23 & 24, 2009 and October 30 & 31, 2009
- Ben Harper and Relentless7 — September 21, 2009 – October 9, 2009 (excluding October 4), Oceania, 2010 European tour (excluding festival dates)
- Social Distortion — October 27 & 28, 2009
- Liam Finn — Oceania
- Band of Horses — 2010 North America leg (excluding May 20)
- The Black Keys — May 20, 2010

== Tour dates ==
List of 2009 concerts
Date (2009)	City	Country	Venue
August 8	Calgary	Canada	Canada Olympic Park
August 11	London	England	O_{2} Shepherd's Bush Empire
August 13	Rotterdam	Netherlands	Rotterdam Ahoy
August 15	Berlin	Germany	Wuhlheide
August 17	Manchester	England	Manchester Evening News Arena
August 18	London	England	The O_{2} Arena
August 21	Toronto	Canada	Molson Amphitheatre
August 23	Chicago	United States	United Center
August 24	Chicago	United States	United Center
August 28^{[A]}	San Francisco	United States	Golden Gate Park
September 21	Seattle	United States	KeyArena
September 22	Seattle	United States	KeyArena
September 25	Vancouver	Canada	General Motors Place
September 26	Ridgefield	United States	The Amphitheater at Clark County
September 28	West Valley City	United States	E-Center
September 30	Los Angeles	United States	Gibson Amphitheatre
October 1	Los Angeles	United States	Gibson Amphitheatre
October 4^{[B]}	Austin	United States	Zilker Park
October 6	Los Angeles	United States	Gibson Amphitheatre
October 7	Los Angeles	United States	Gibson Amphitheatre
October 9	San Diego	United States	Viejas Arena
October 27	Philadelphia	United States	Wachovia Spectrum
October 28	Philadelphia	United States	Wachovia Spectrum
October 30	Philadelphia	United States	Wachovia Spectrum
October 31	Philadelphia	United States	Wachovia Spectrum
November 14	Perth	Australia	Members Equity Stadium
November 17	Adelaide	Australia	Adelaide Oval
November 20	Melbourne	Australia	Etihad Stadium
November 22	Sydney	Australia	Sydney Football Stadium
November 25	Brisbane	Australia	Queensland Sport and Athletics Centre
November 27	Auckland	New Zealand	Mt Smart Stadium
November 29	Christchurch	New Zealand	AMI Stadium

List of 2010 concerts
Date (2010)	City	Country	Venue
May 1^{[C]}	New Orleans	United States	Fair Grounds Race Course
May 3	Kansas City	United States	Sprint Center
May 4	St. Louis	United States	Scottrade Center
May 6	Columbus	United States	Nationwide Arena
May 7	Noblesville	United States	Verizon Wireless Music Center
May 9	Cleveland	United States	Quicken Loans Arena
May 10	Buffalo	United States	HSBC Arena
May 13	Bristow	United States	Jiffy Lube Live
May 15	Hartford	United States	XL Center
May 17	Boston	United States	TD Garden
May 18	Newark	United States	Prudential Center
May 20	New York City	United States	Madison Square Garden
May 21	New York City	United States	Madison Square Garden
June 22	Dublin	Ireland	The O_{2}
June 23	Belfast	Northern Ireland	Odyssey Arena
June 25^{[D]}	London	England	Hyde Park
June 27^{[E]}	Nijmegen	Netherlands	Goffertpark
June 30	Berlin	Germany	Wuhlheide
July 1^{[F]}	Gdynia	Poland	Lotnisko Gdynia-Kosakowo
July 3^{[G]}	Arras	France	Citadelle Vauban
July 4^{[H]}	Werchter	Belgium	Werchter Festival Grounds
July 6^{[I]}	Venice	Italy	Parco San Giuliano
July 9^{[J]}	Bilbao	Spain	Mount Cobetas
July 10^{[K]}	Oeiras	Portugal	Passeio Marítimo de Alges

Festivals and other miscellaneous performances

- ^{A} This concert was a part of "Outside Lands Music and Arts Festival"
- ^{B} This concert was a part of "Austin City Limits Music Festival"
- ^{C} This concert was a part of "New Orleans Jazz & Heritage Festival"
- ^{D} This concert was a part of "Hard Rock Calling"
- ^{E} This concert was a part of "Rock In Park Festival"
- ^{F} This concert was a part of "Open'er Festival"
- ^{G} This concert was a part of "Main Square Festival"
- ^{H} This concert was a part of "Rock Werchter"
- ^{I} This concert was a part of "Heineken Jammin' Festival"
- ^{J} This concert was a part of "BBK Live Festival"
- ^{K} This concert was a part of "Optimus Alive!"

== Band members ==
Pearl Jam

- Jeff Ament – bass guitar
- Stone Gossard – rhythm guitar
- Mike McCready – lead guitar
- Eddie Vedder – lead vocals, guitar
- Matt Cameron – drums

Additional musicians

- Boom Gaspar – Hammond B3 and keyboards

== Gallery ==
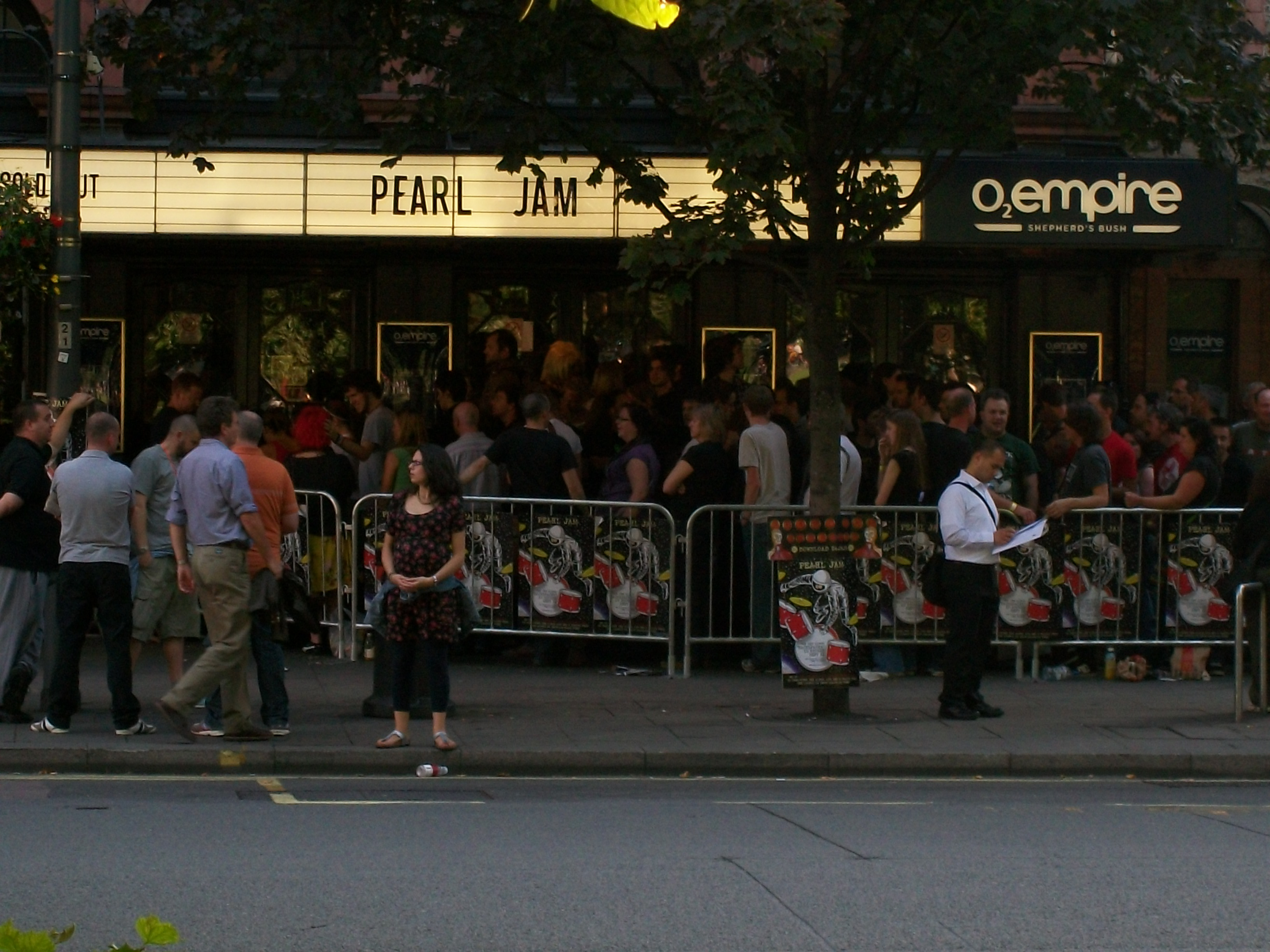
Pearl Jam fans outside the Shepherd's Bush Empire, London, England on August 11, 2009

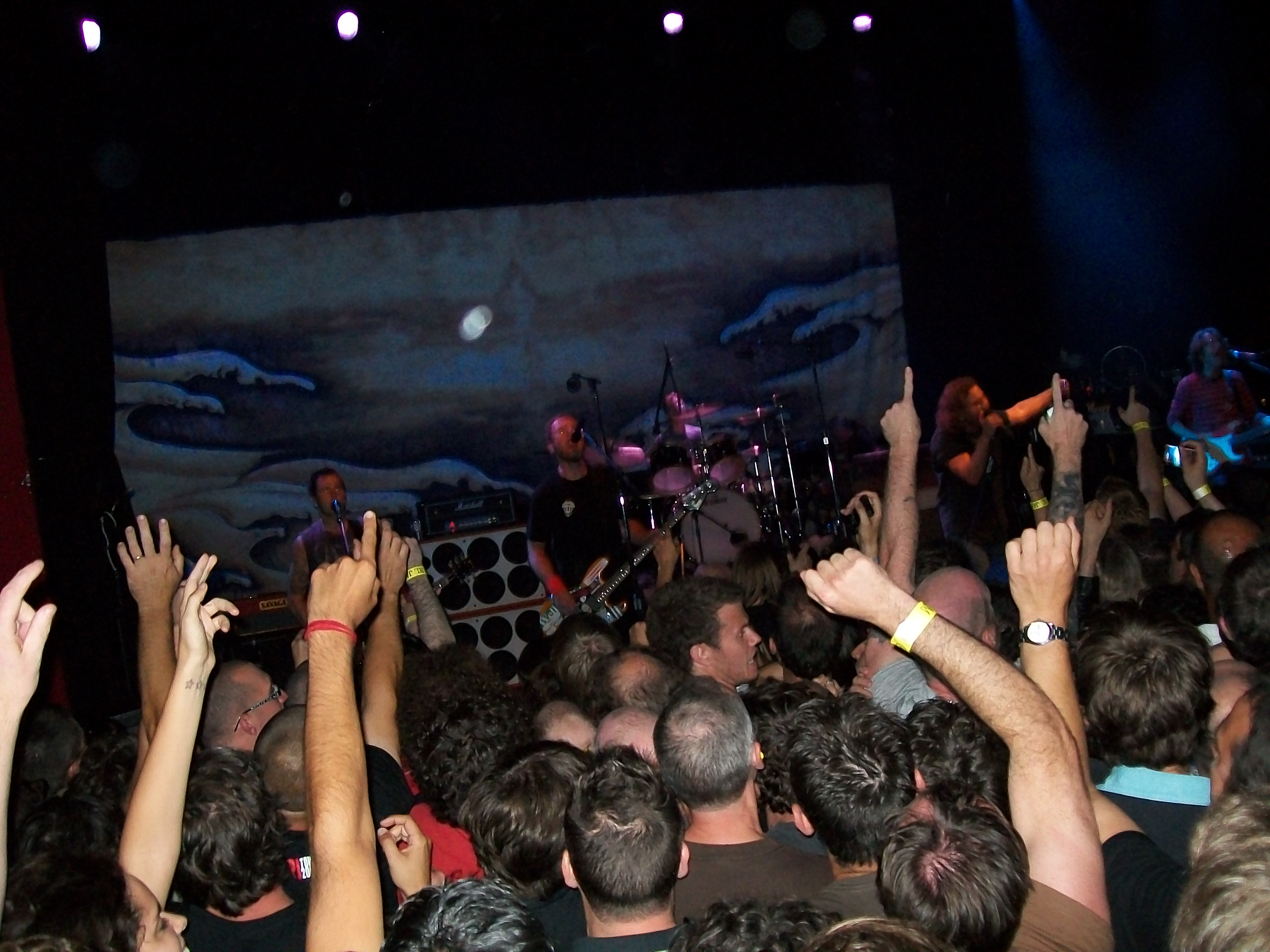
Pearl Jam in London, England on August 11, 2009

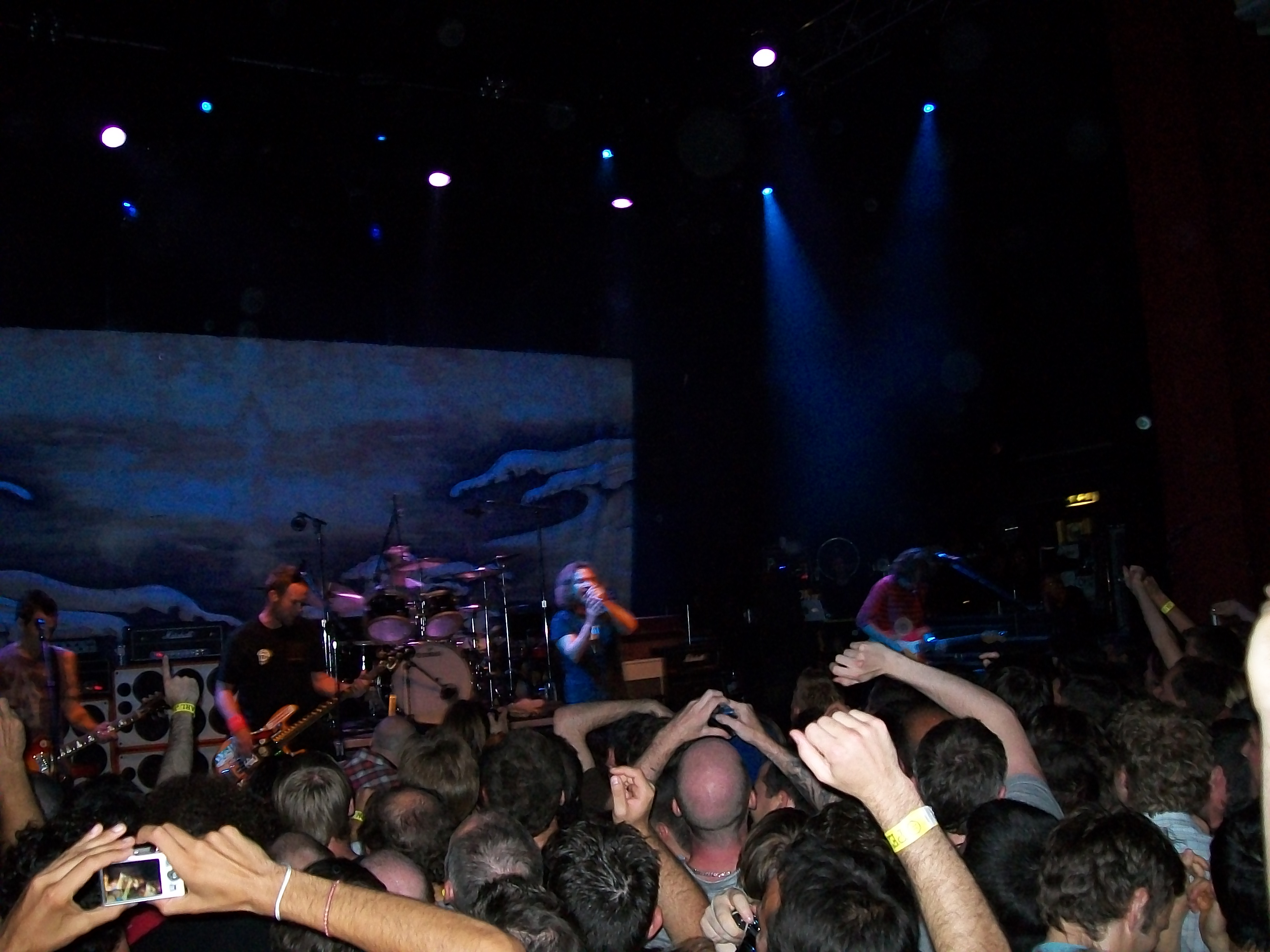
Pearl Jam in London, England on August 11, 2009

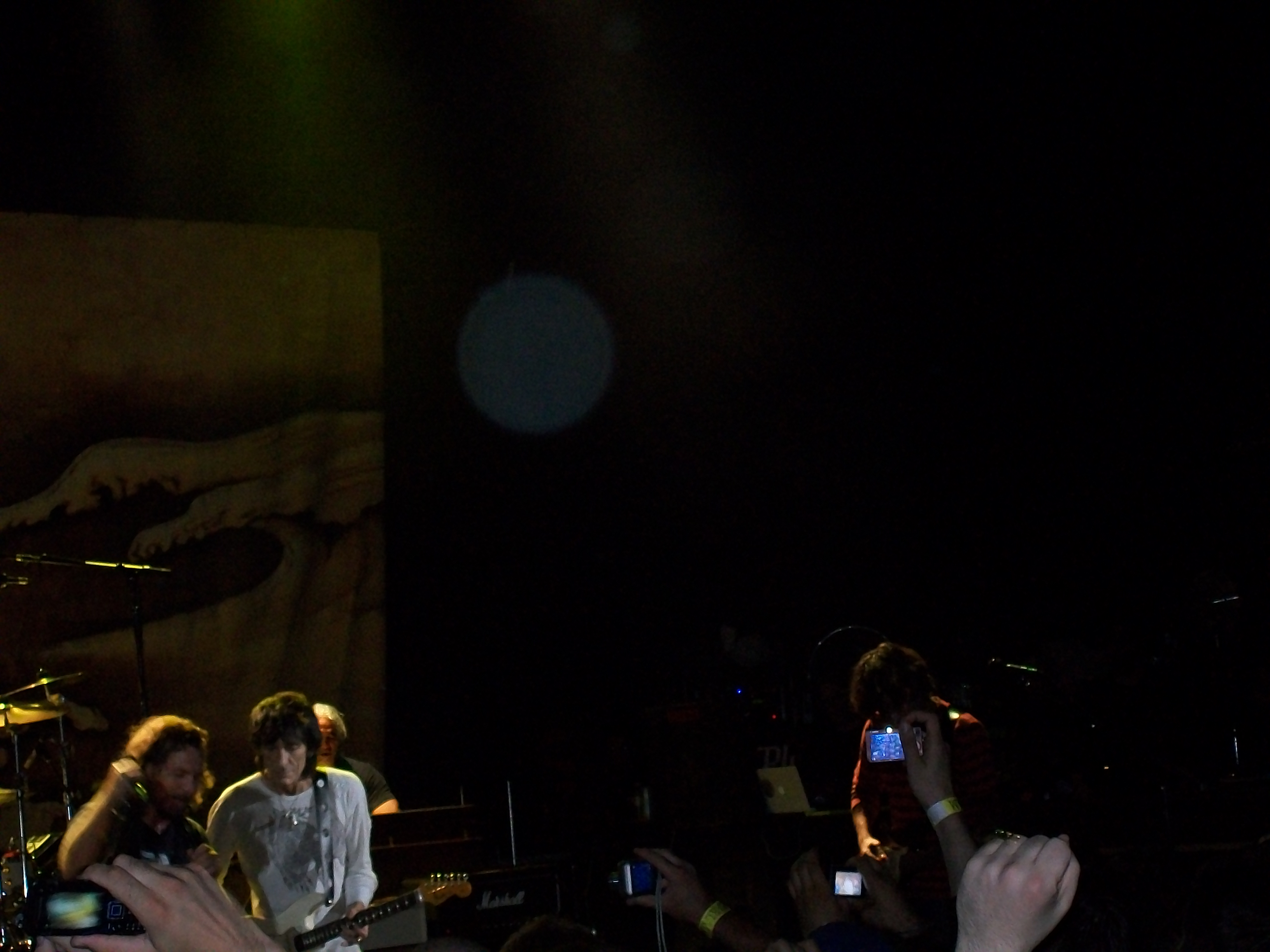
Pearl Jam, with Ronnie Wood, performing "All Along the Watchtower" in London, England on August 11, 2009

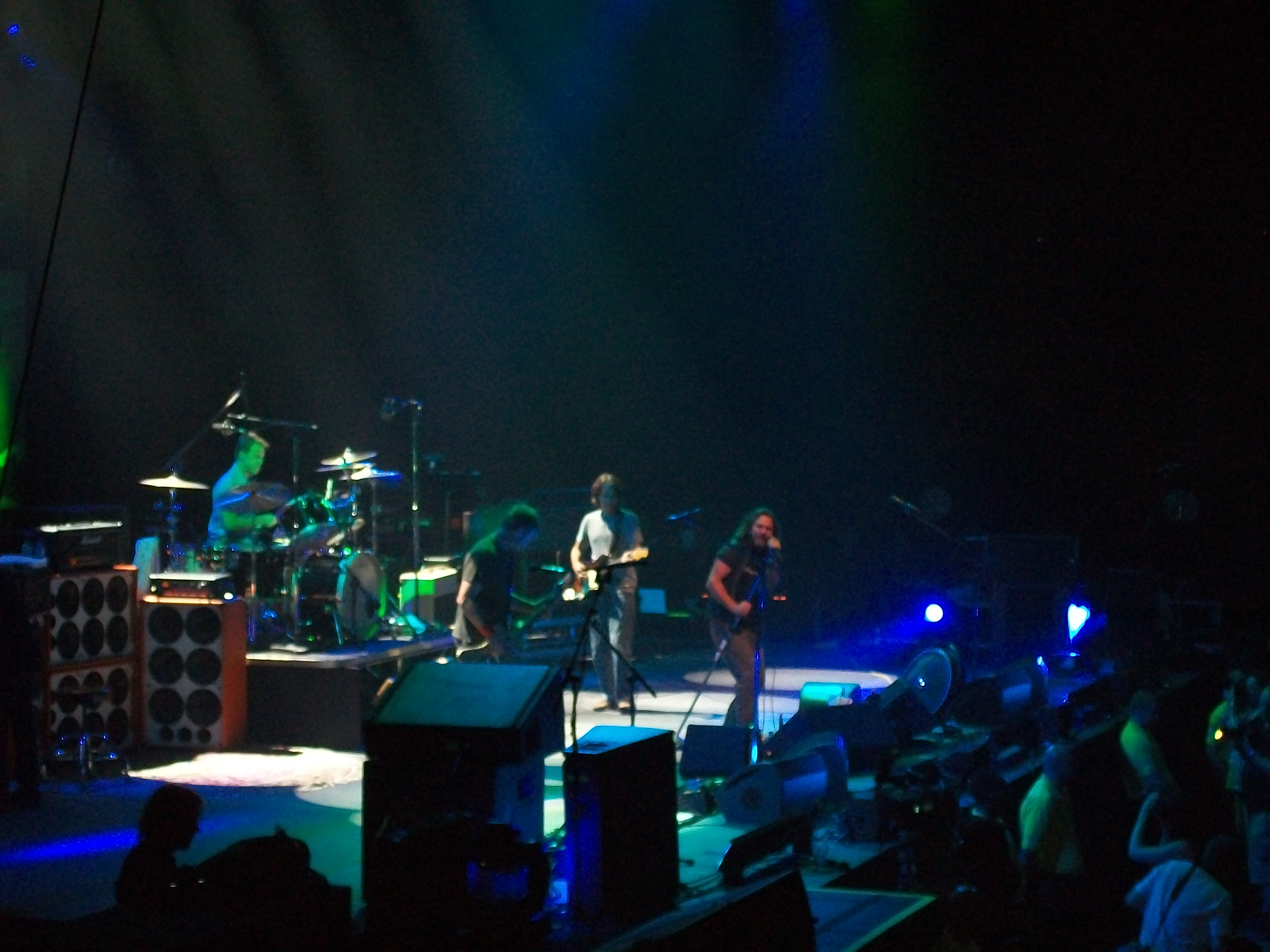
Pearl Jam in Manchester, England on August 17, 2009

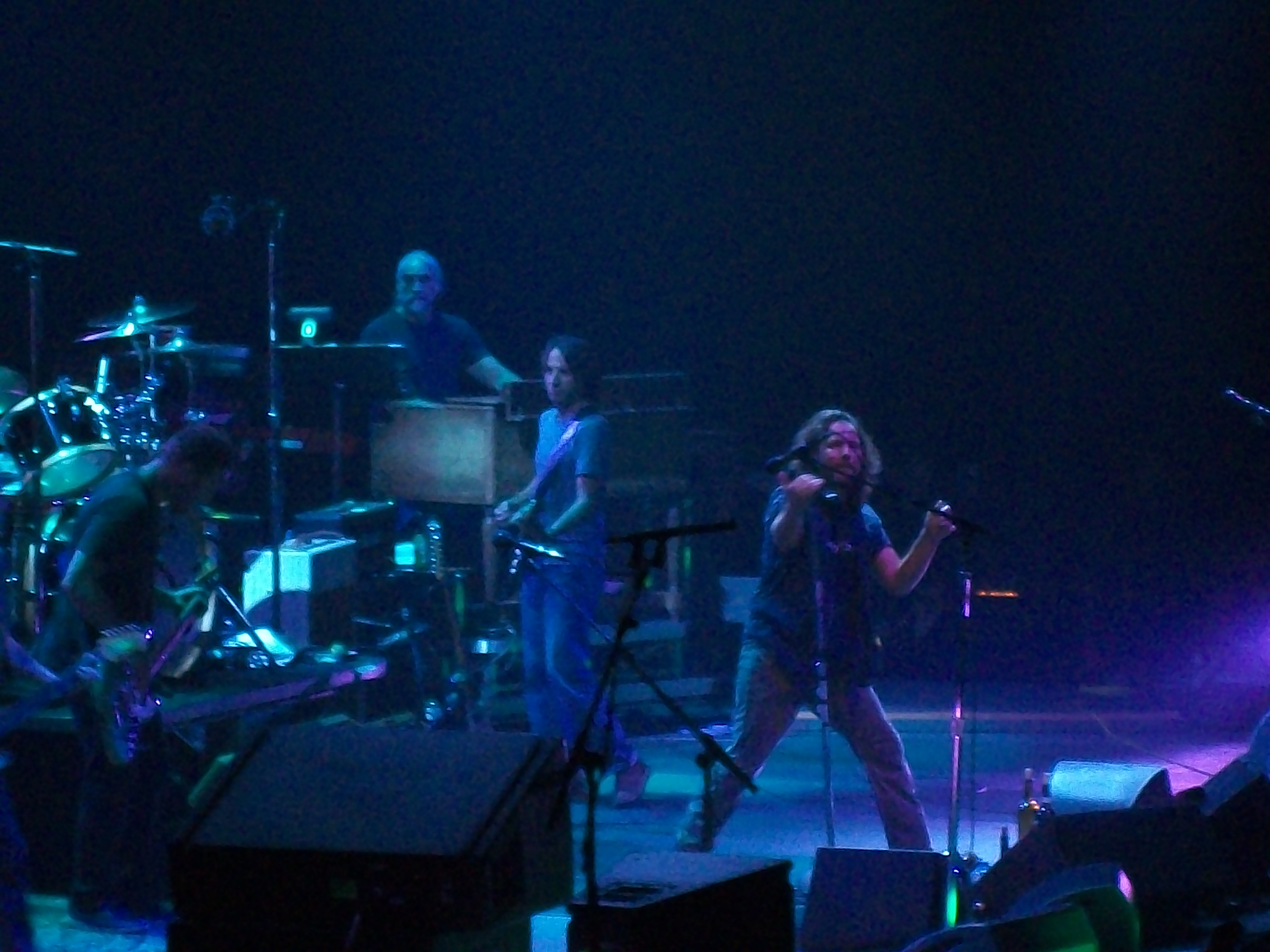
Pearl Jam in Manchester, England on August 17, 2009

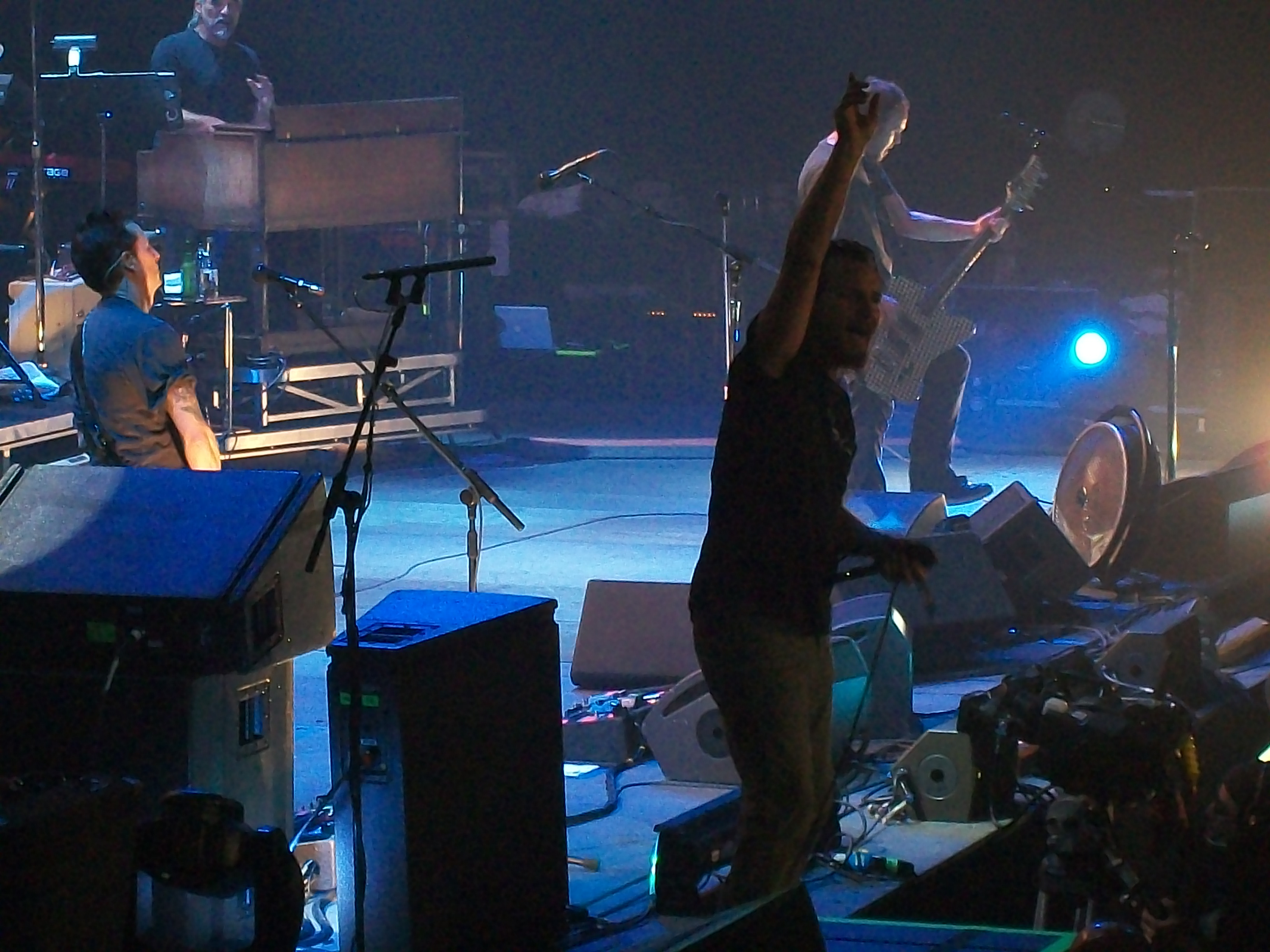
Pearl Jam in Manchester, England on August 17, 2009

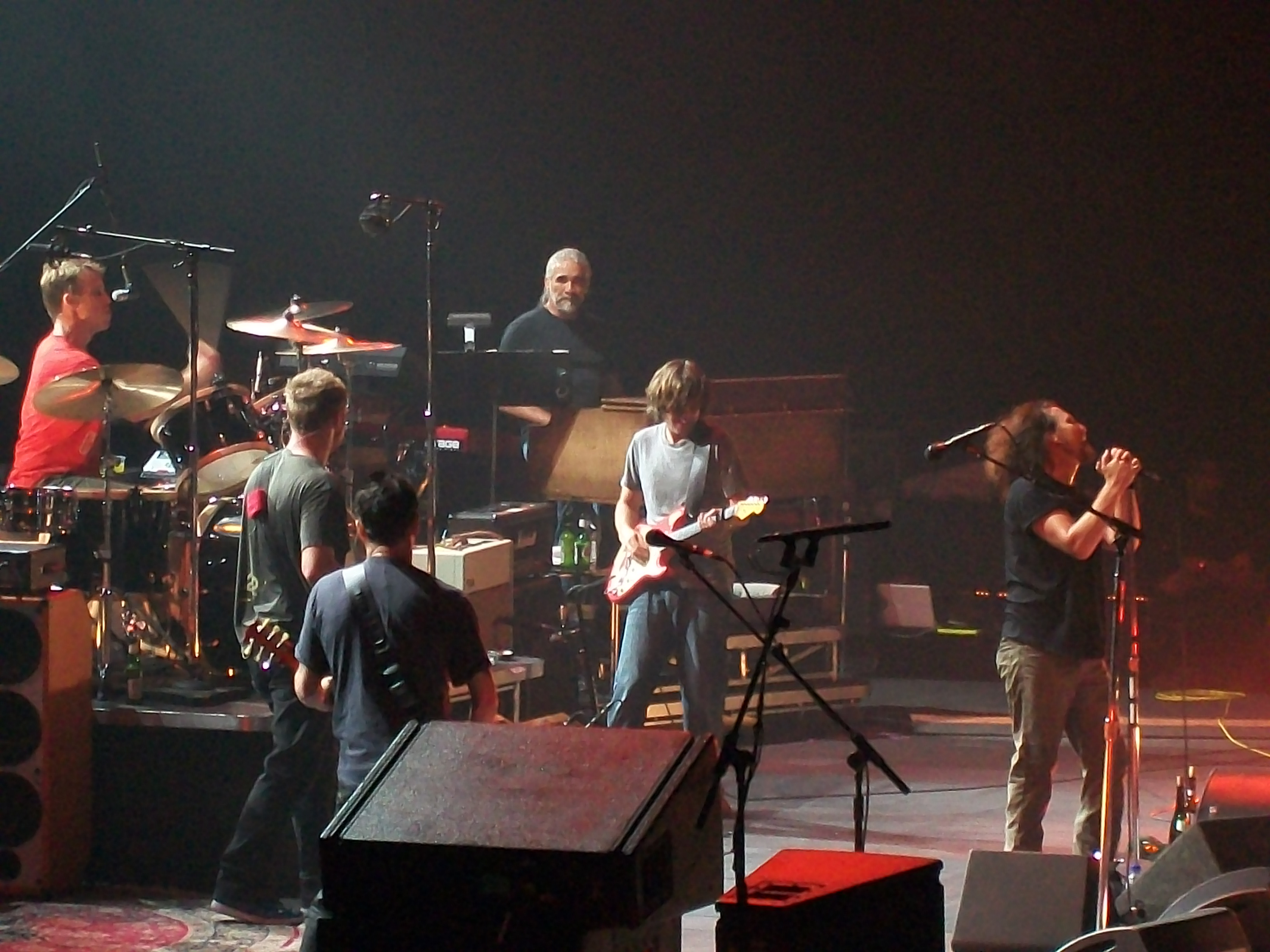
Pearl Jam in Manchester, England on August 17, 2009

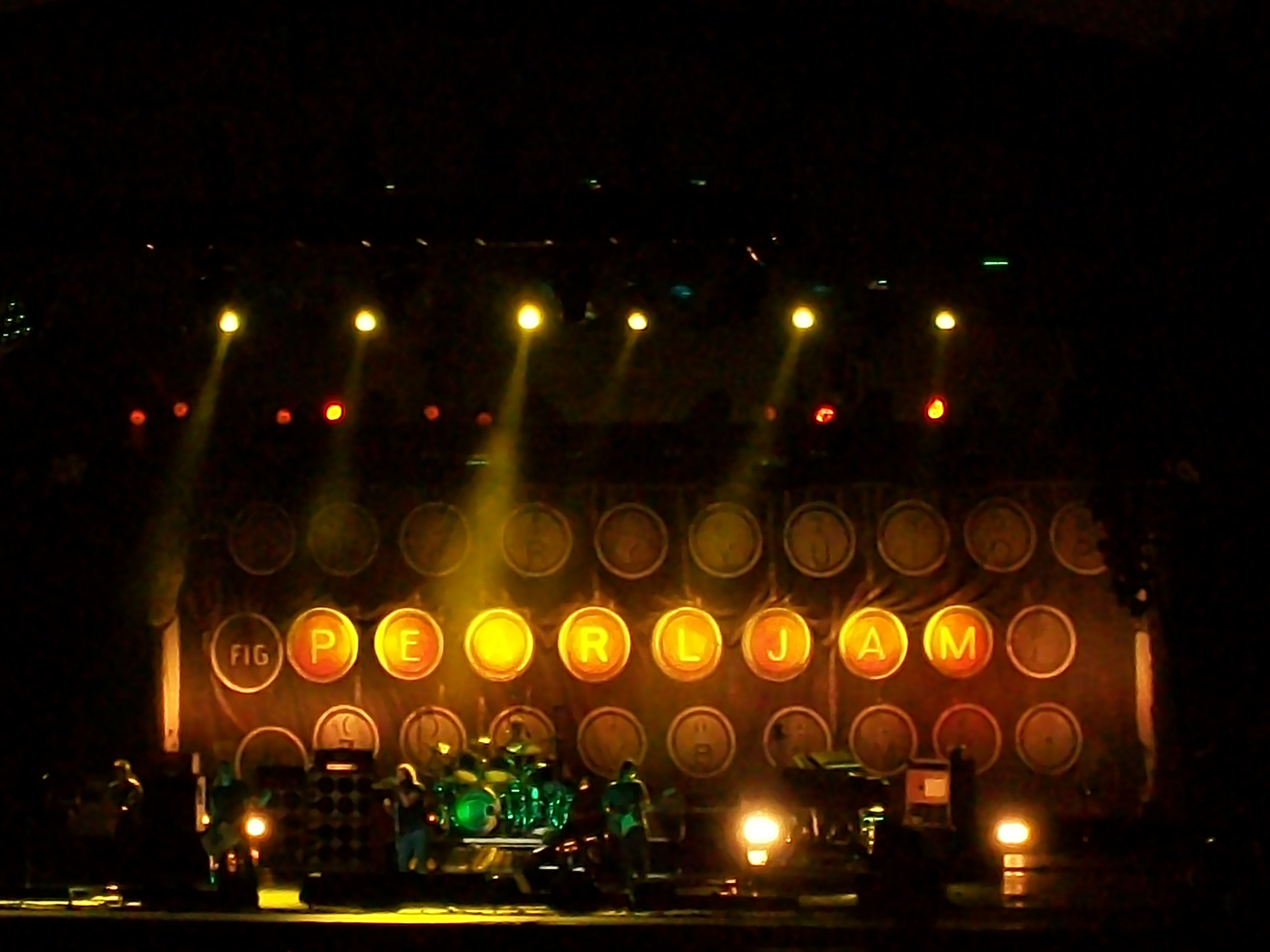
Pearl Jam in Adelaide, Australia on November 17, 2009

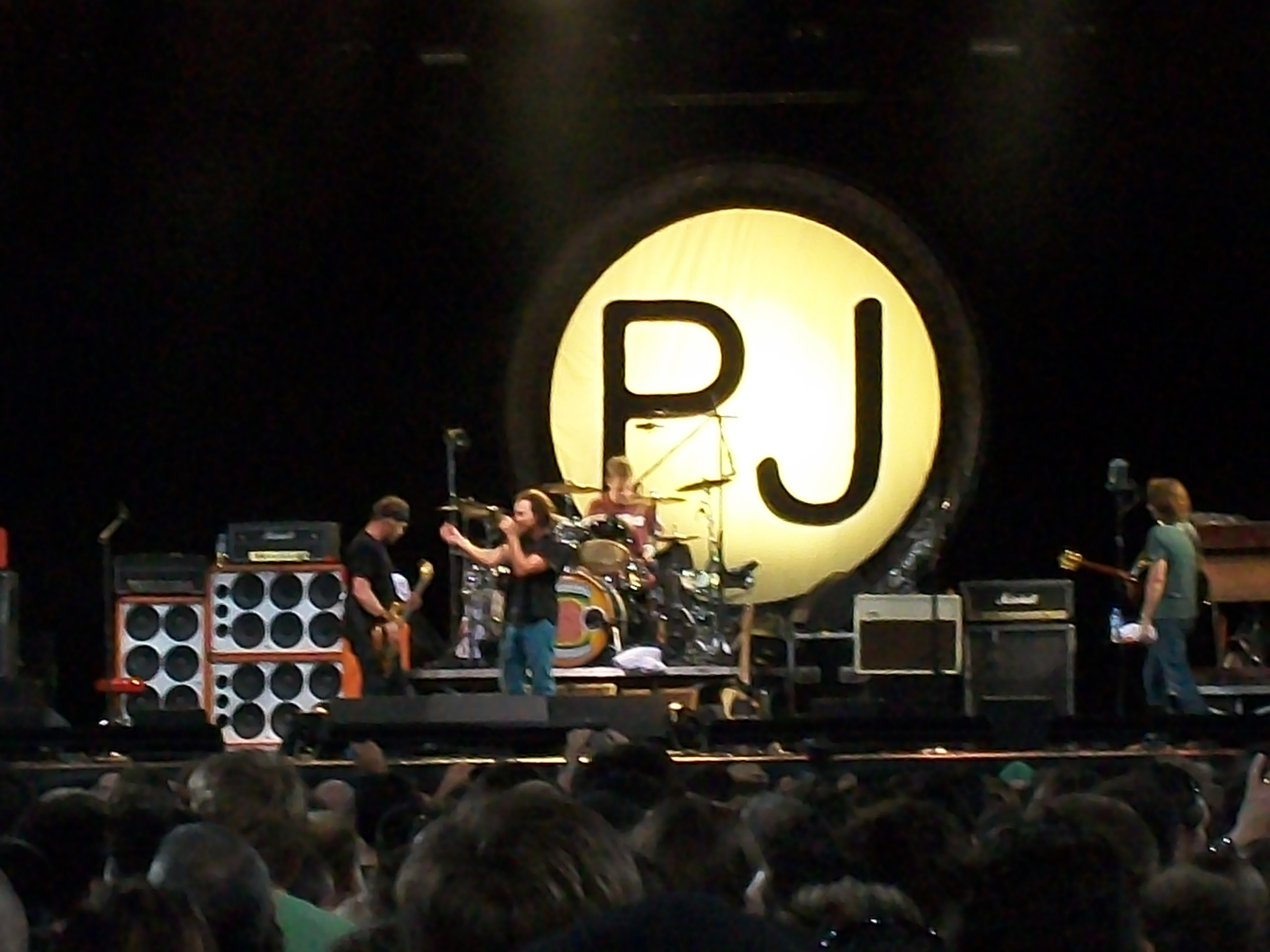
Pearl Jam in Adelaide, Australia on November 17, 2009

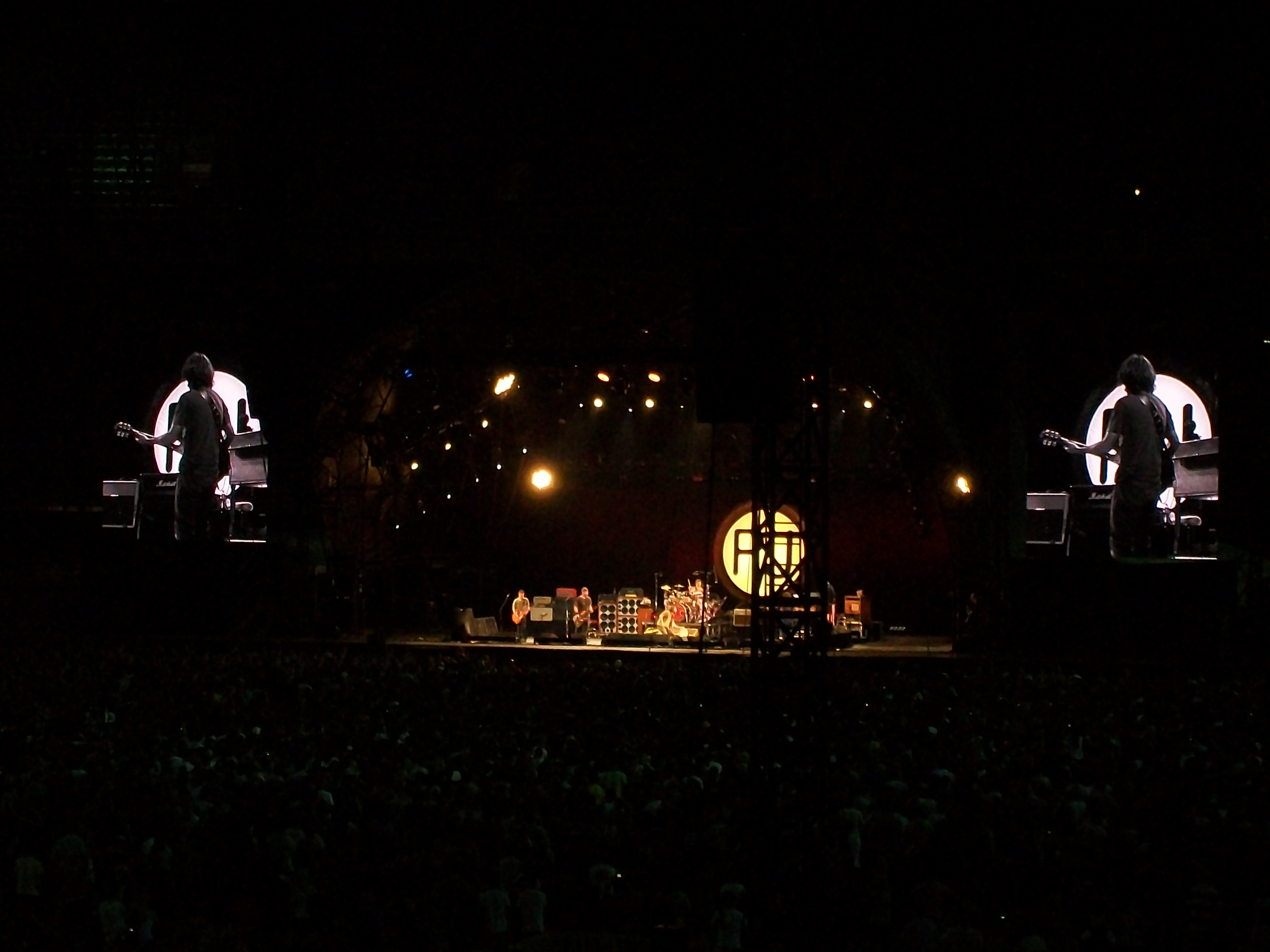
Pearl Jam in Melbourne, Australia on November 20, 2009

Eddie Vedder in Melbourne, Australia on November 20, 2009

Ben Harper and Eddie Vedder covering "Under Pressure" in Sydney, Australia on November 22, 2009

Eddie Vedder in Sydney, Australia on November 22, 2009

Ben Harper and Eddie Vedder covering "Under Pressure" in Brisbane, Australia on November 25, 2009

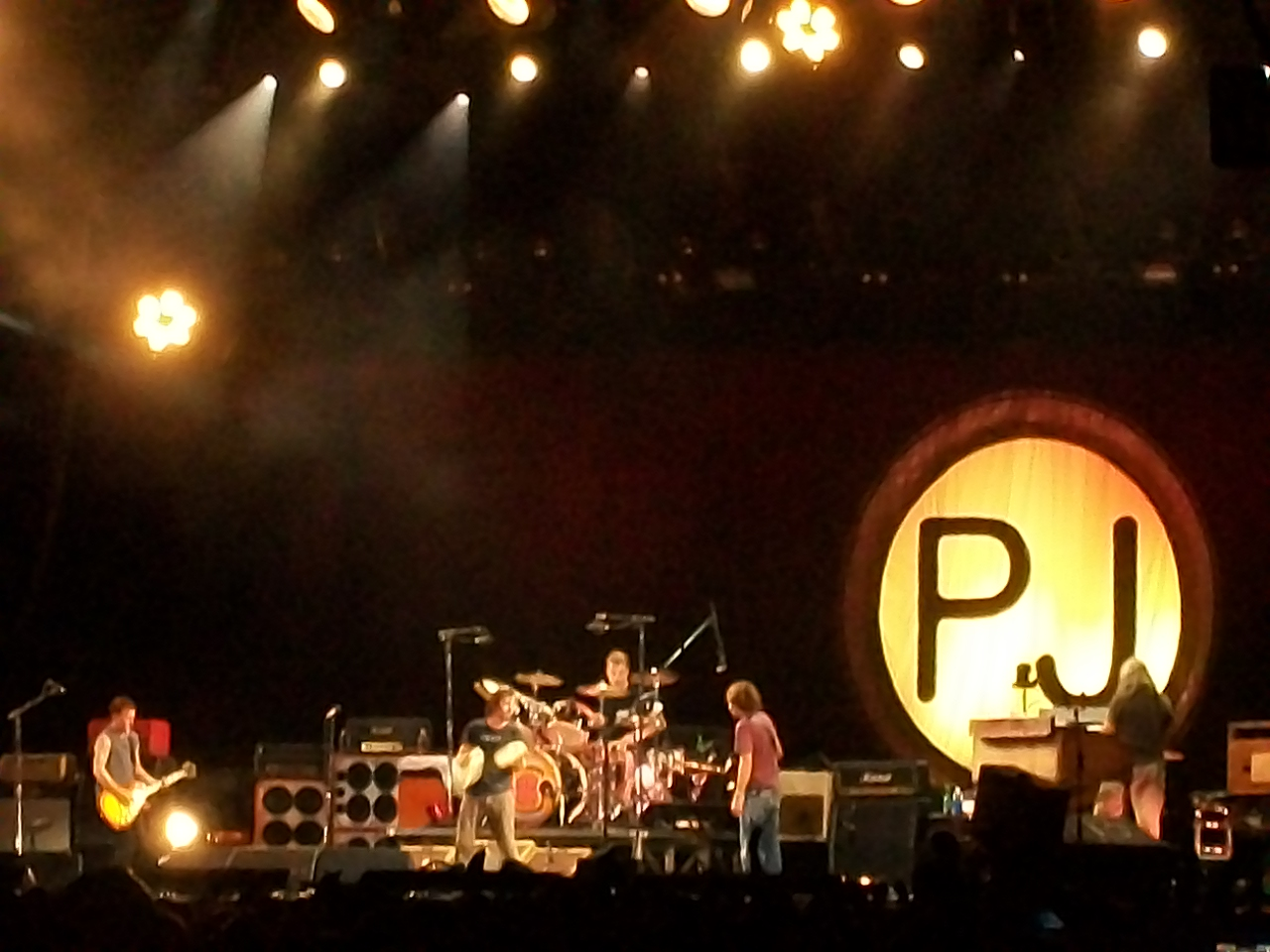
Pearl Jam in Brisbane, Australia on November 25, 2009

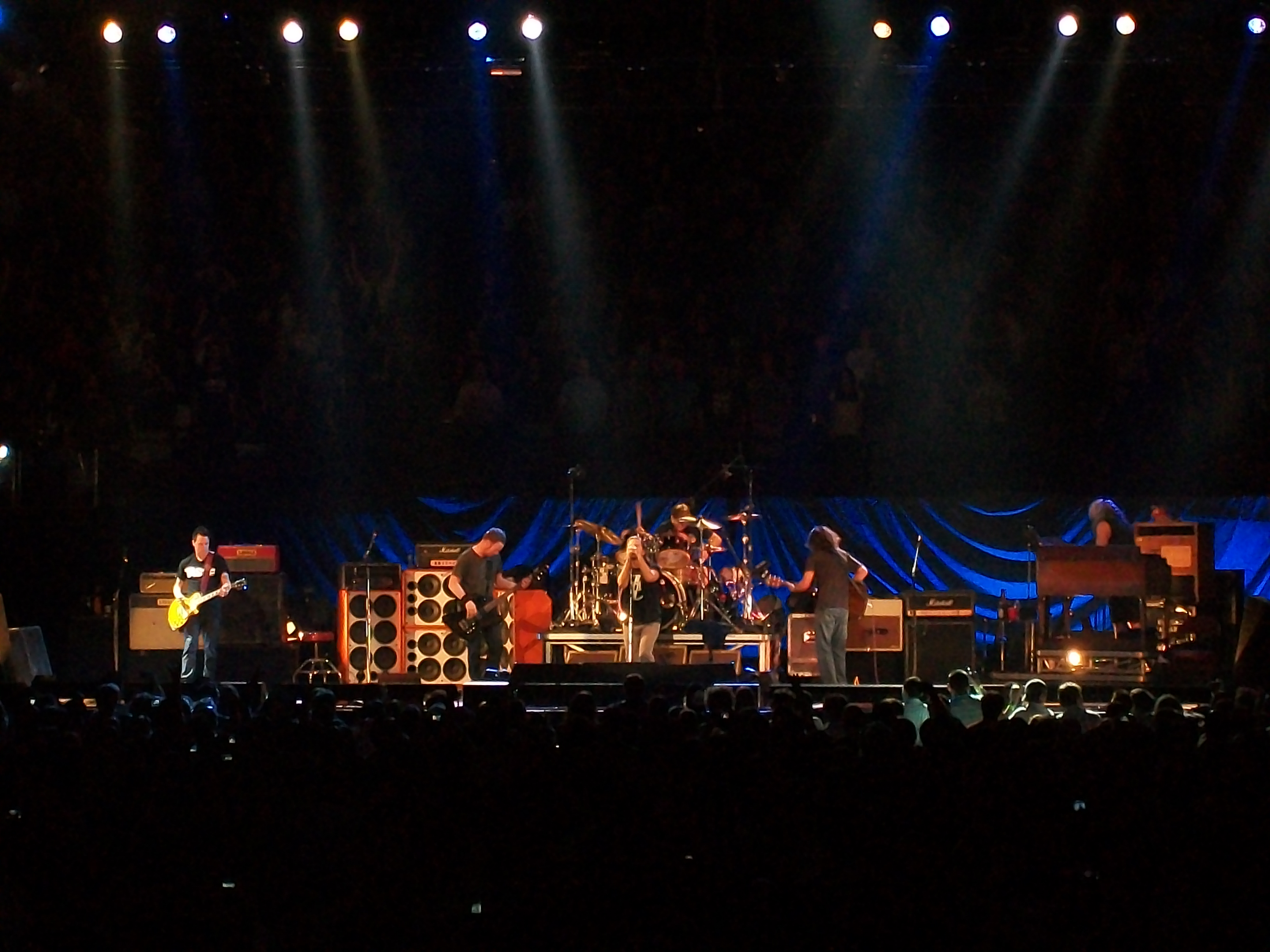
Pearl Jam at Madison Square Garden on May 20, 2010

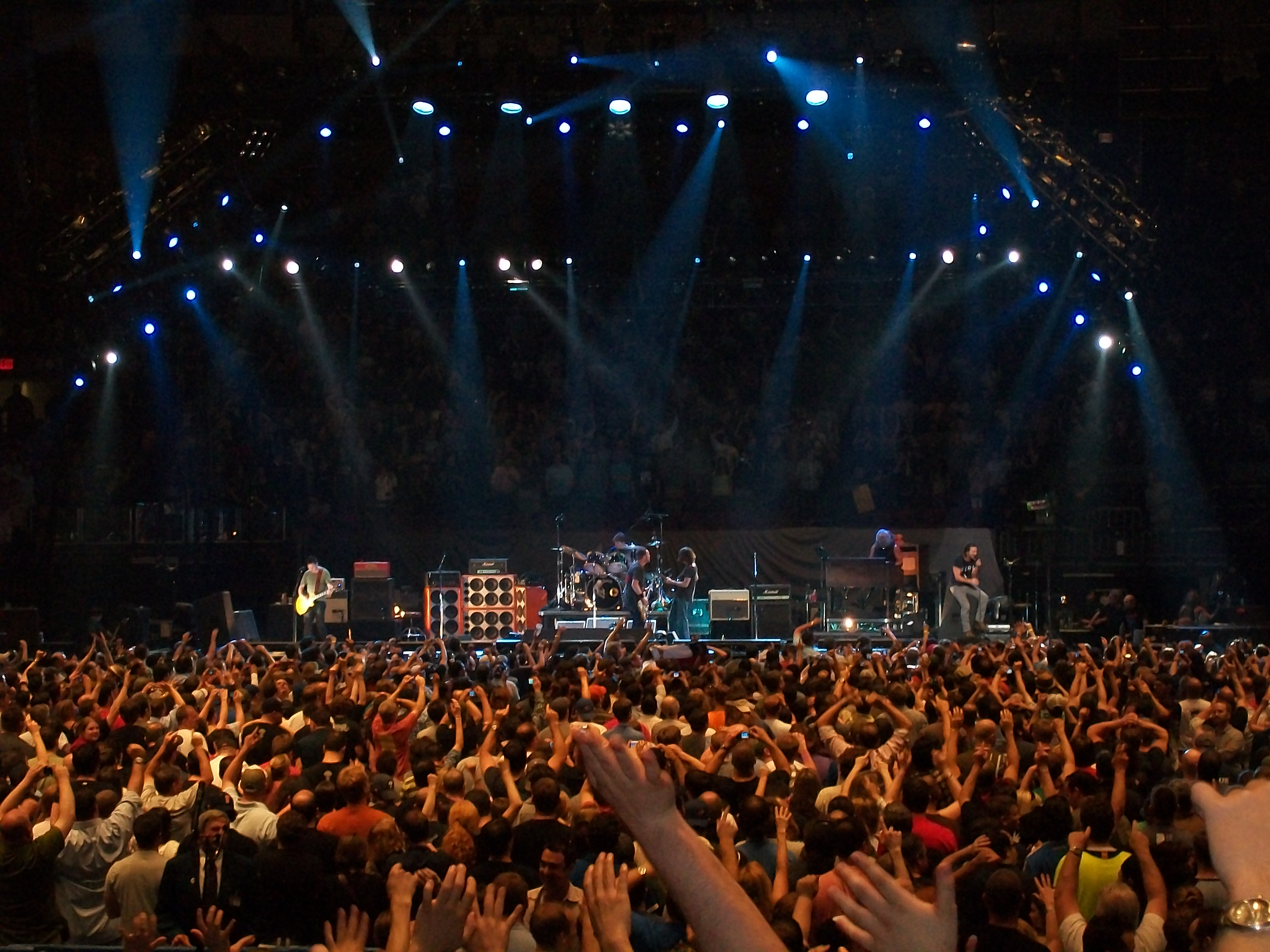
Pearl Jam at Madison Square Garden on May 20, 2010

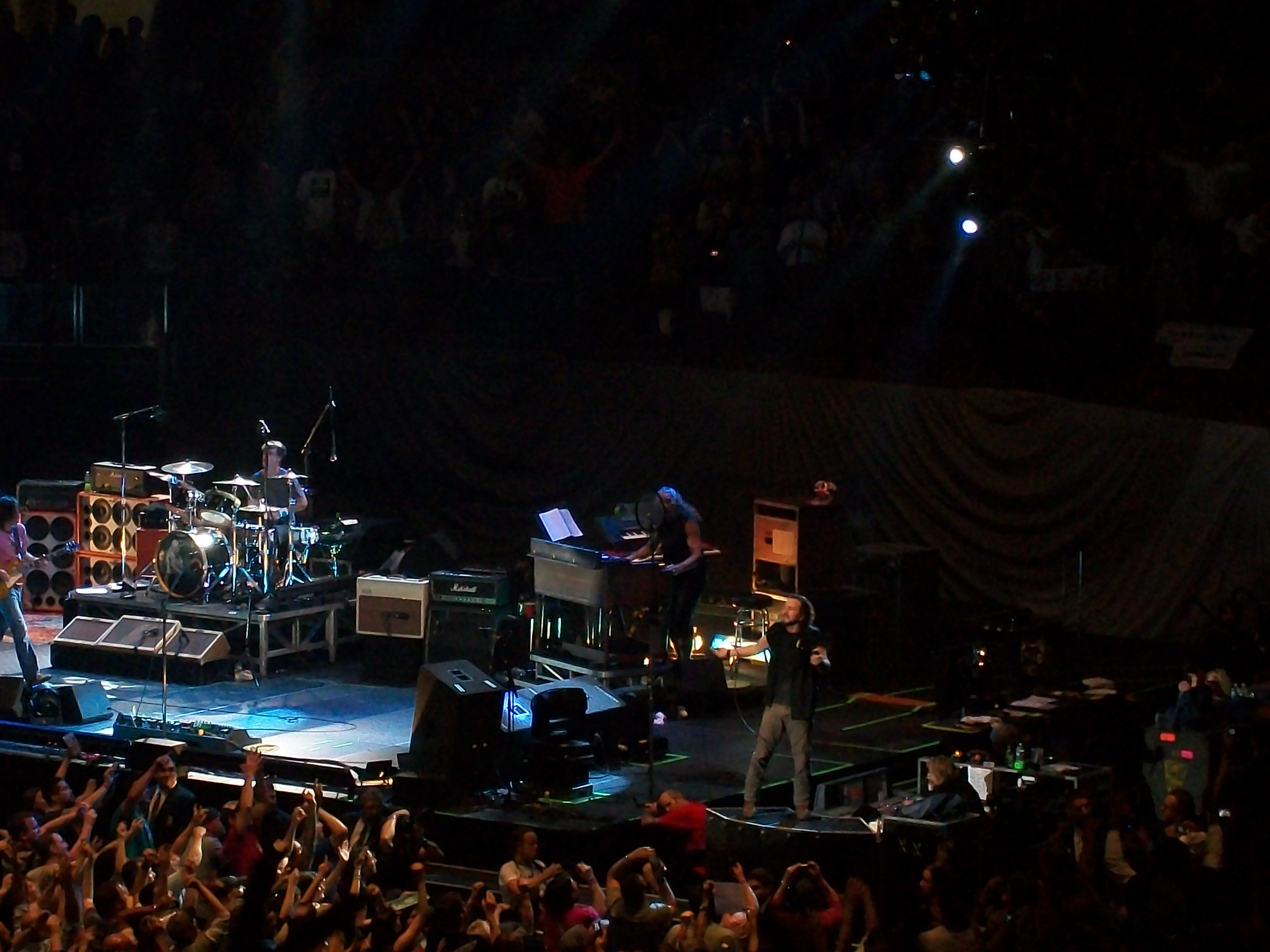
Pearl Jam at Madison Square Garden on May 21, 2010

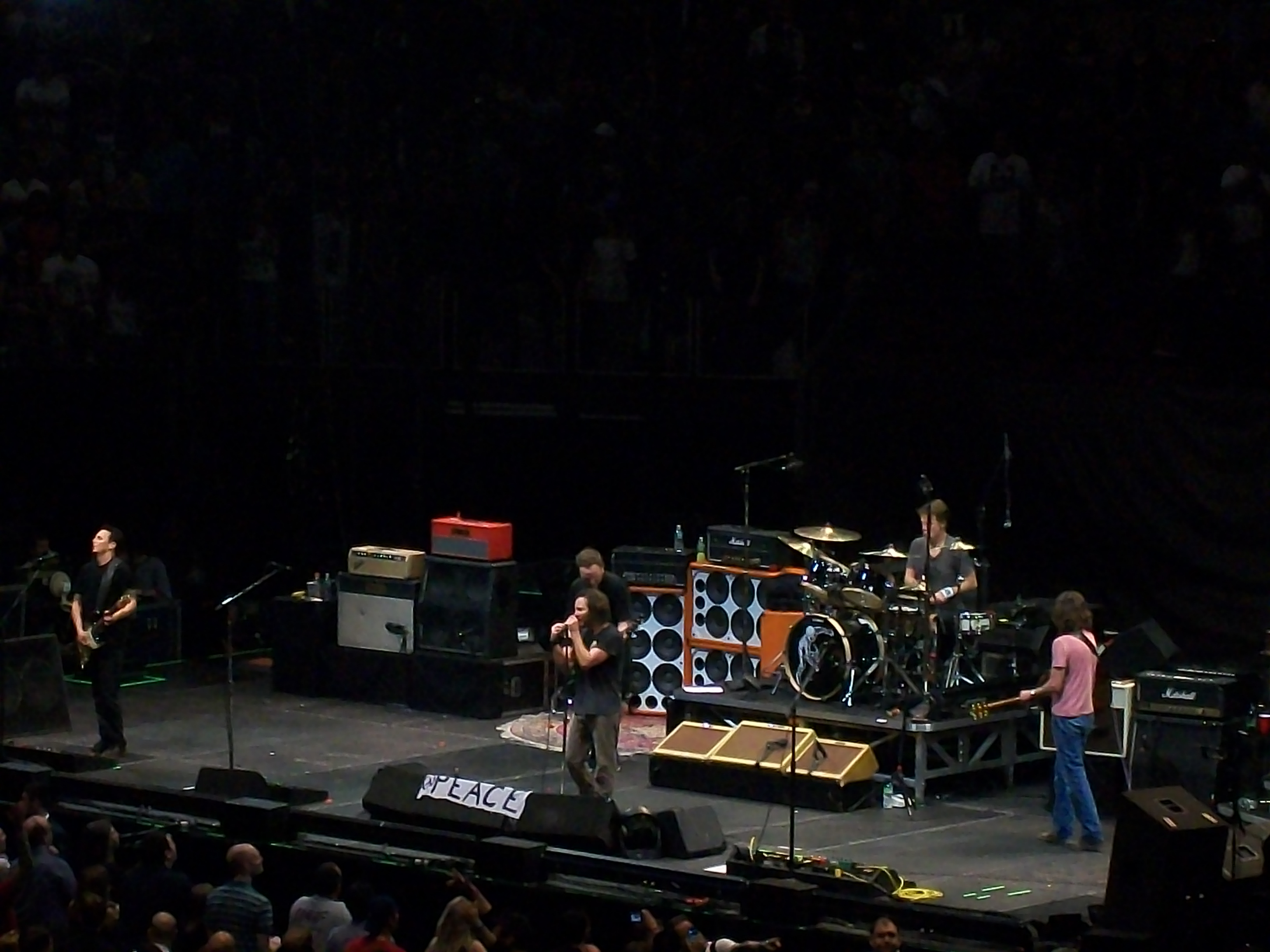
Pearl Jam at Madison Square Garden on May 21, 2010
