= Pearl Jam 2007 European Tour =

2007 concert tour by Pearl Jam

2007 European Tour
- Tour by Pearl Jam
- Location: Europe
- Associated album: Pearl Jam
- Start date: June 6, 2007
- End date: June 29, 2007
- No. of shows: 12

Pearl Jam concert chronology
- 2006 World Tour (2006); 2007 European Tour (2007); 2008 United States Tour (2008)

The Pearl Jam 2007 European Tour was a concert tour by the American rock band Pearl Jam.

== History ==
The tour consisted of twelve dates in Europe, including several festival appearances. Pearl Jam's performance on June 15, 2007 at the Heineken Jammin' Festival was cancelled due to a strong tornado that hit the park. The entire standing area for the show in London, England at Wembley Arena on June 18, 2007 was exclusively for members of the Pearl Jam fanclub. This was the band's only tour scheduled for 2007. The band elected not to release official bootlegs for this tour.

== Opening acts ==
- The Futureheads — (June 12, June 21 & June 26)
- Linkin Park — (June 13)
- Coma — (June 13)
- Idlewild — (June 18)
- Interpol — (June 21)
- Incubus — (June 28)
- Kings of Leon — (June 28)
- Satellite Party — (June 28)

== Tour dates ==
Date	City	Country	Venue
Europe
June 8, 2007^{[A]}	Lisbon	Portugal	Passeio Marítimo Algés
June 9, 2007^{[B]}	Madrid	Spain	Estadio Butarque de Leganés
June 12, 2007	Munich	Germany	Olympiahalle
June 13, 2007	Katowice	Poland	Silesian Stadium
June 16, 2007^{[C]}	Nickelsdorf	Austria	Burgenland
June 18, 2007	London	England	Wembley Arena
June 21, 2007	Düsseldorf	Germany	ISS Dome
June 23, 2007^{[D]}	Tuttlingen	Germany	Neuhausen ob Eck Airfield
June 24, 2007^{[E]}	Scheeßel	Germany	Eichenring
June 26, 2007	Copenhagen	Denmark	Forum Copenhagen
June 28, 2007	Nijmegen	Netherlands	Goffertpark
June 29, 2007^{[F]}	Werchter	Belgium	Werchter Festival Grounds

Festivals and other miscellaneous performances
^{A} This concert was a part of "Optimus Alive!"
^{B} This concert was a part of "Festimad"
^{C} This concert was a part of "Nova Rock Festival"
^{D} This concert was a part of "Southside Festival"
^{E} This concert was a part of "Hurricane Festival"
^{F} This concert was a part of "Rock Werchter"

Cancellations and rescheduled shows

June 15, 2007	Venice, Italy	Parco San Giuliano	Cancelled
June 21, 2007	Düsseldorf, Germany	LTU Arena	Rescheduled to ISS Dome due to poor ticket sales.

== Band members ==
Pearl Jam

- Jeff Ament – bass guitar
- Stone Gossard – rhythm guitar
- Mike McCready – lead guitar
- Eddie Vedder – lead vocals, guitar
- Matt Cameron – drums

Additional musicians

- Boom Gaspar – Hammond B3 and keyboards

== Gallery ==
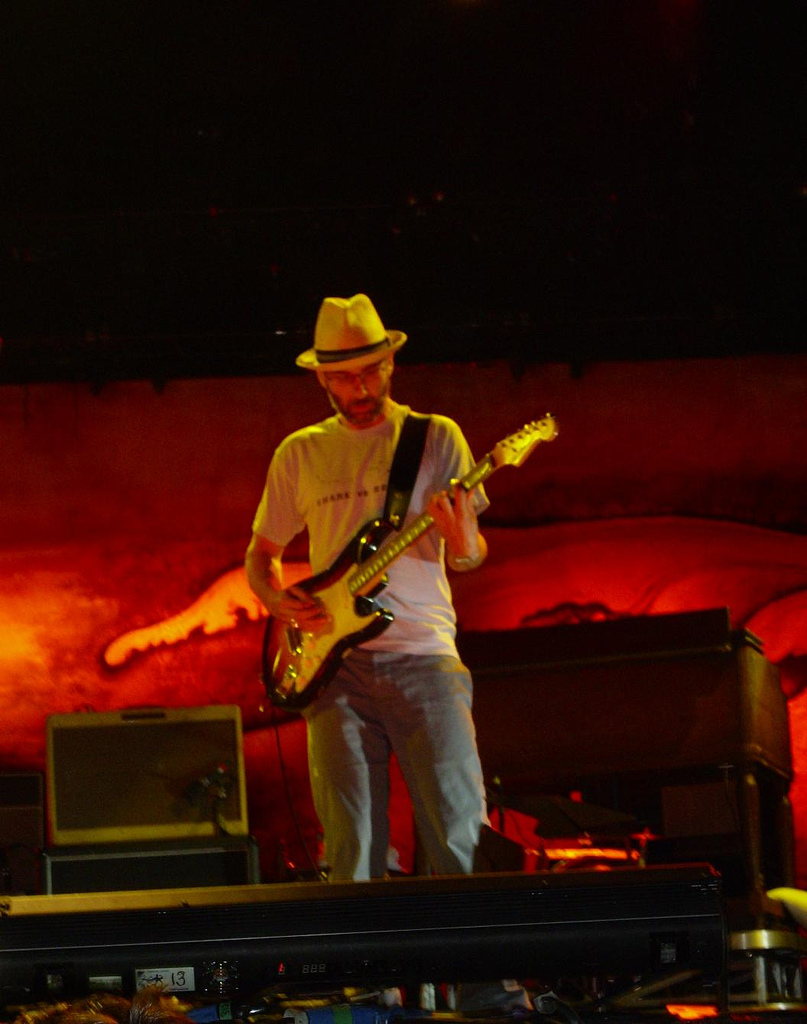
Stone Gossard on stage with Pearl Jam in Madrid, Spain on June 9, 2007.

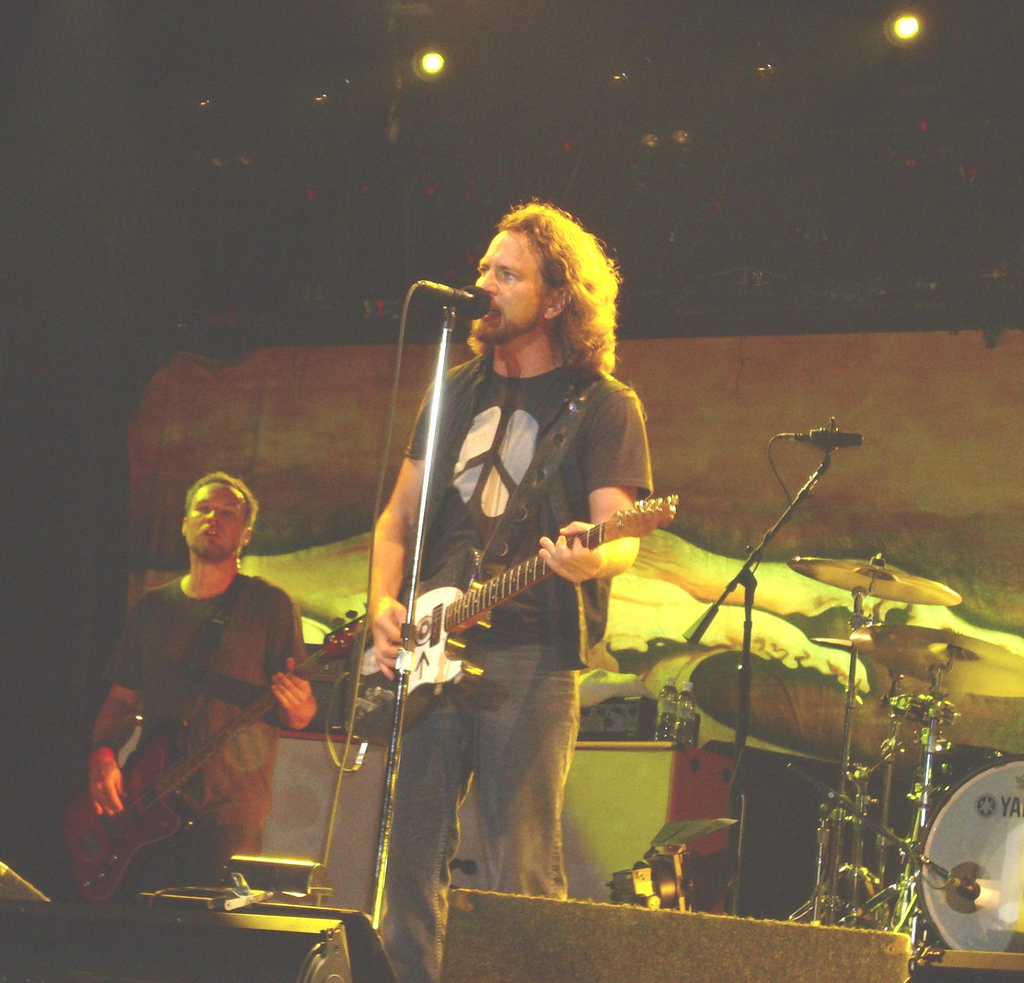
Pearl Jam in Madrid, Spain on June 9, 2007.

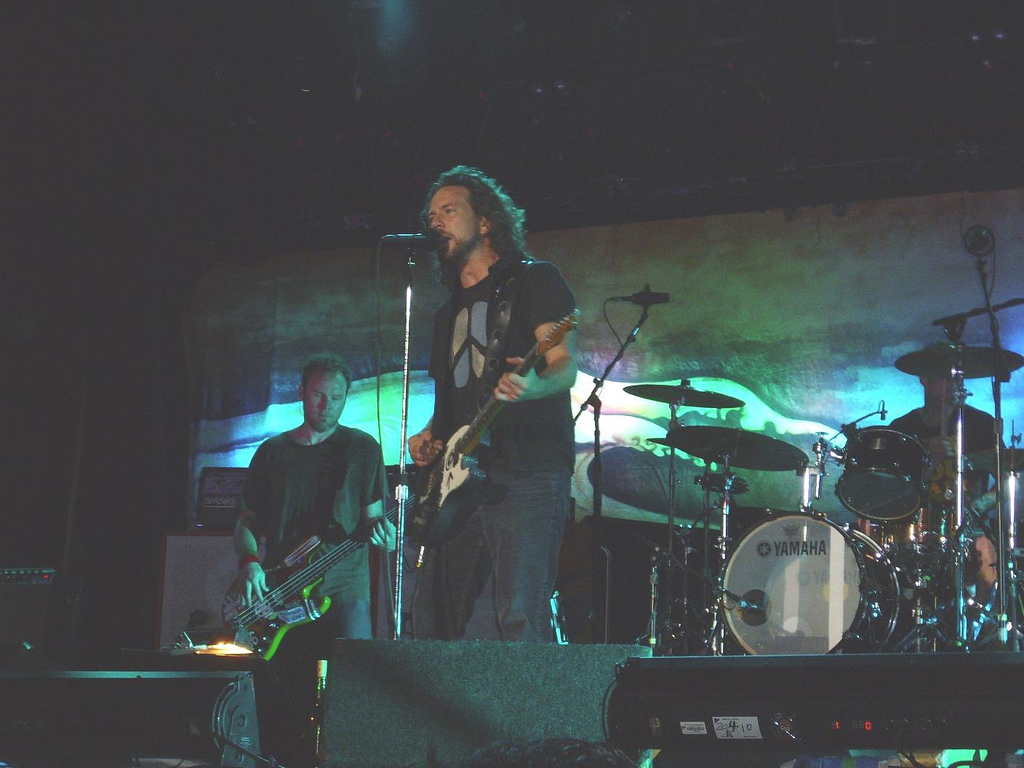
Pearl Jam in Madrid, Spain on June 9, 2007.

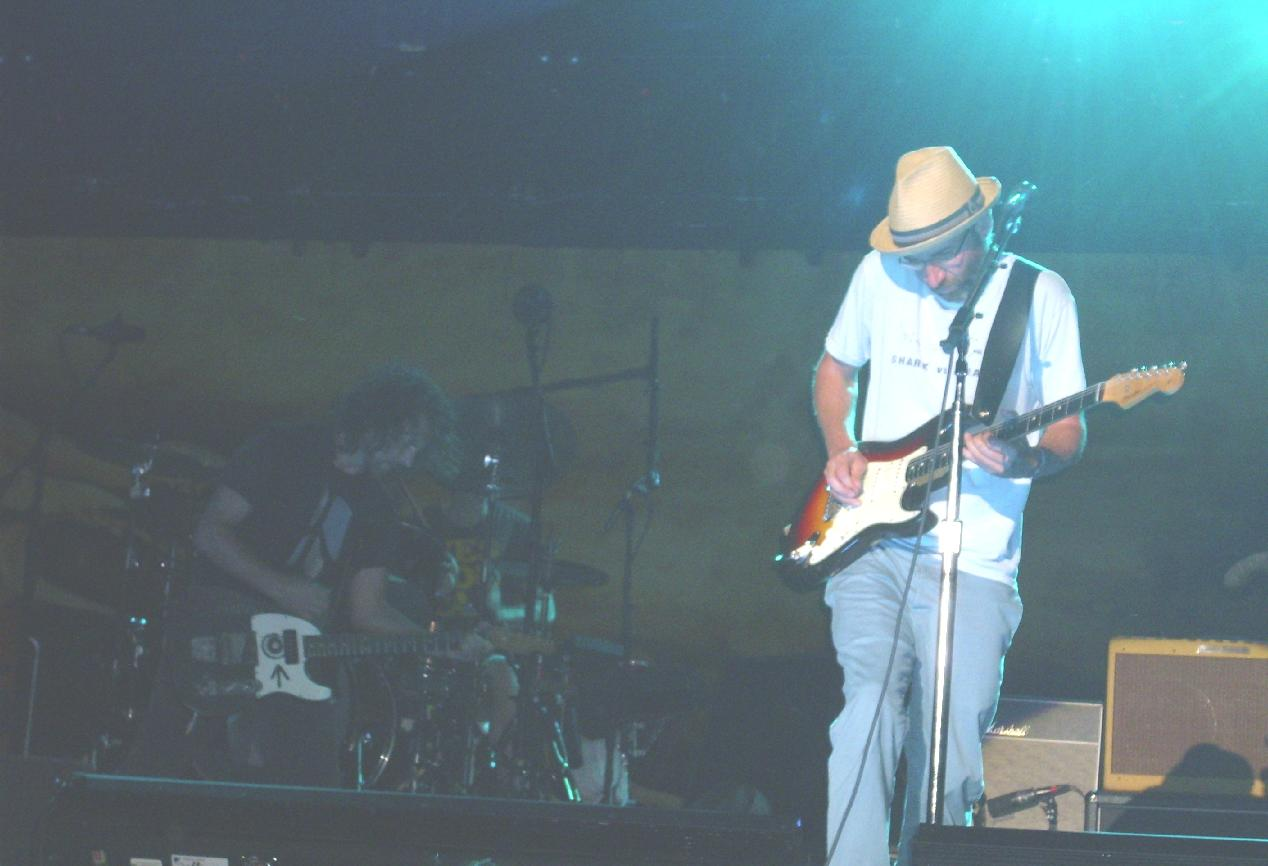
Pearl Jam in Madrid, Spain on June 9, 2007.

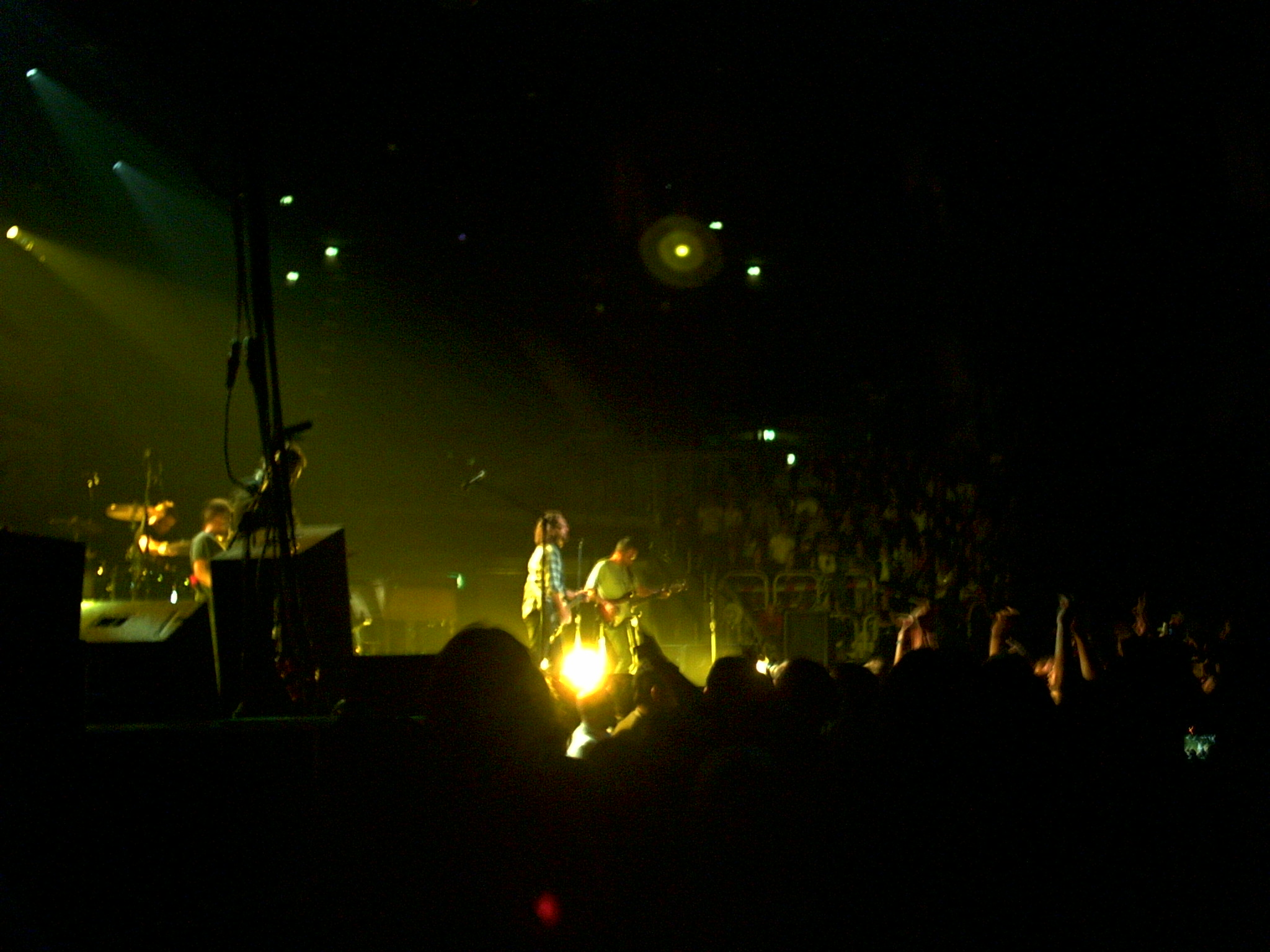
Pearl Jam in Düsseldorf, Germany on June 21, 2007.

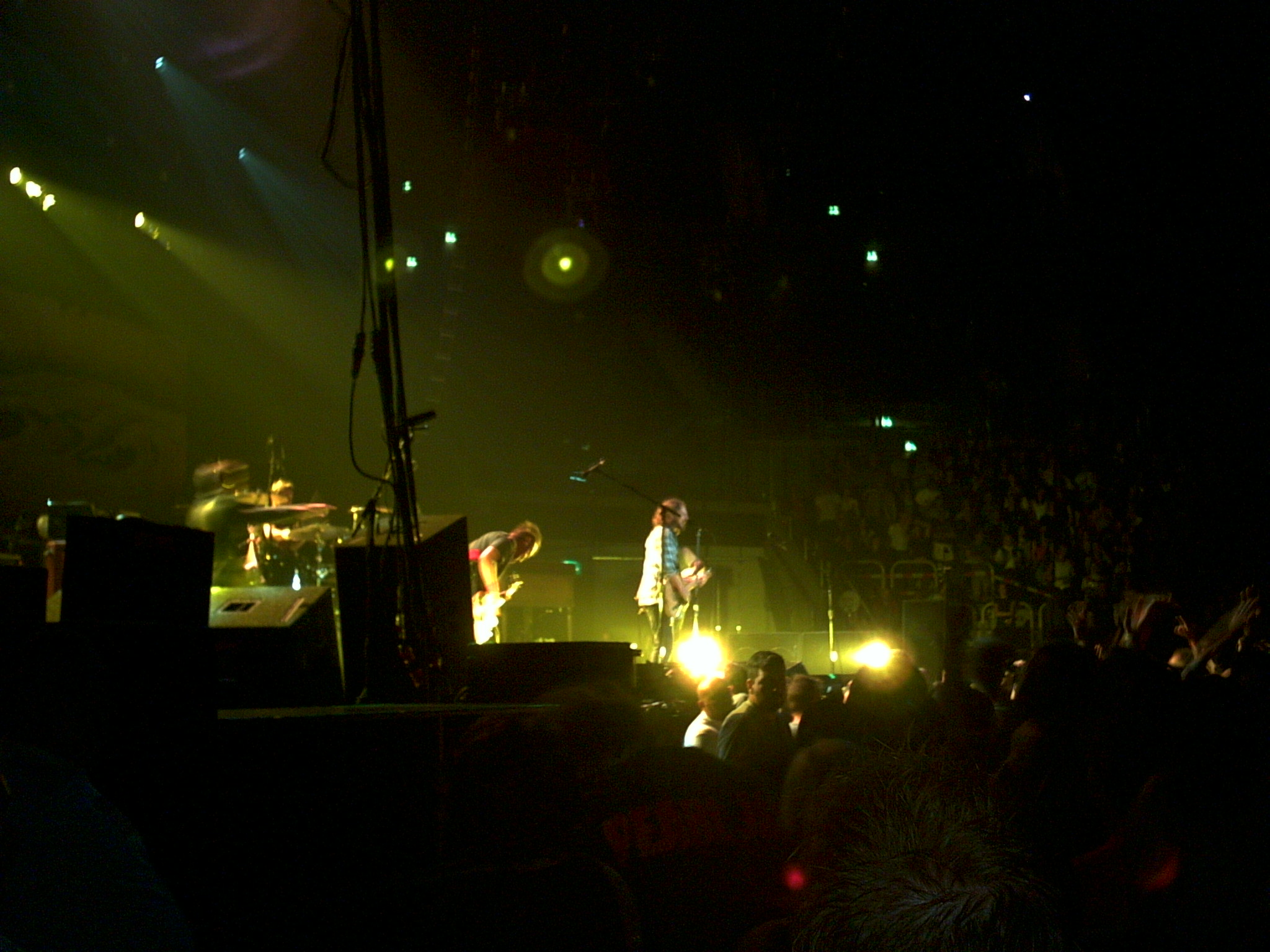
Pearl Jam in Düsseldorf, Germany on June 21, 2007.

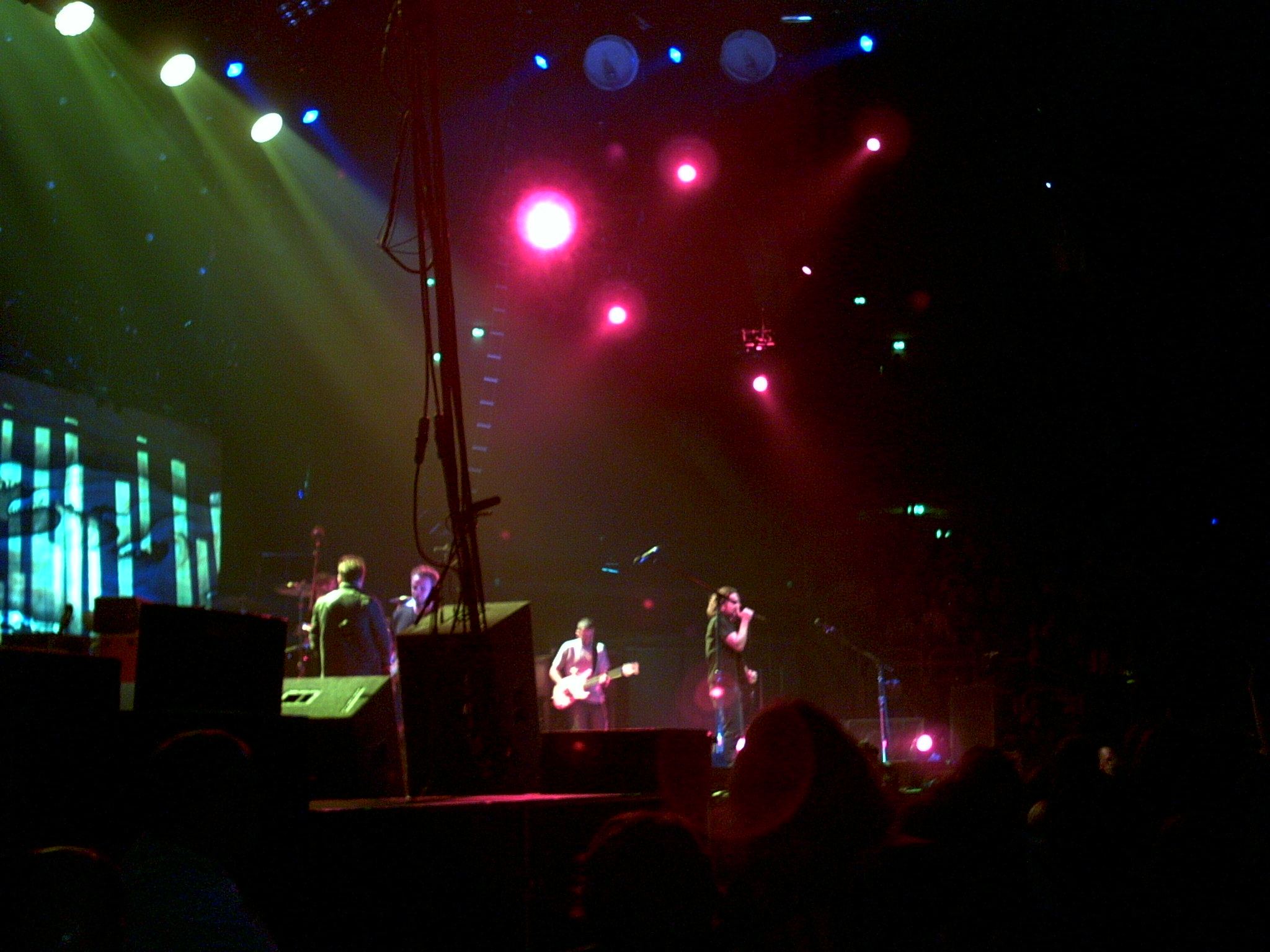
Pearl Jam in Düsseldorf, Germany on June 21, 2007.

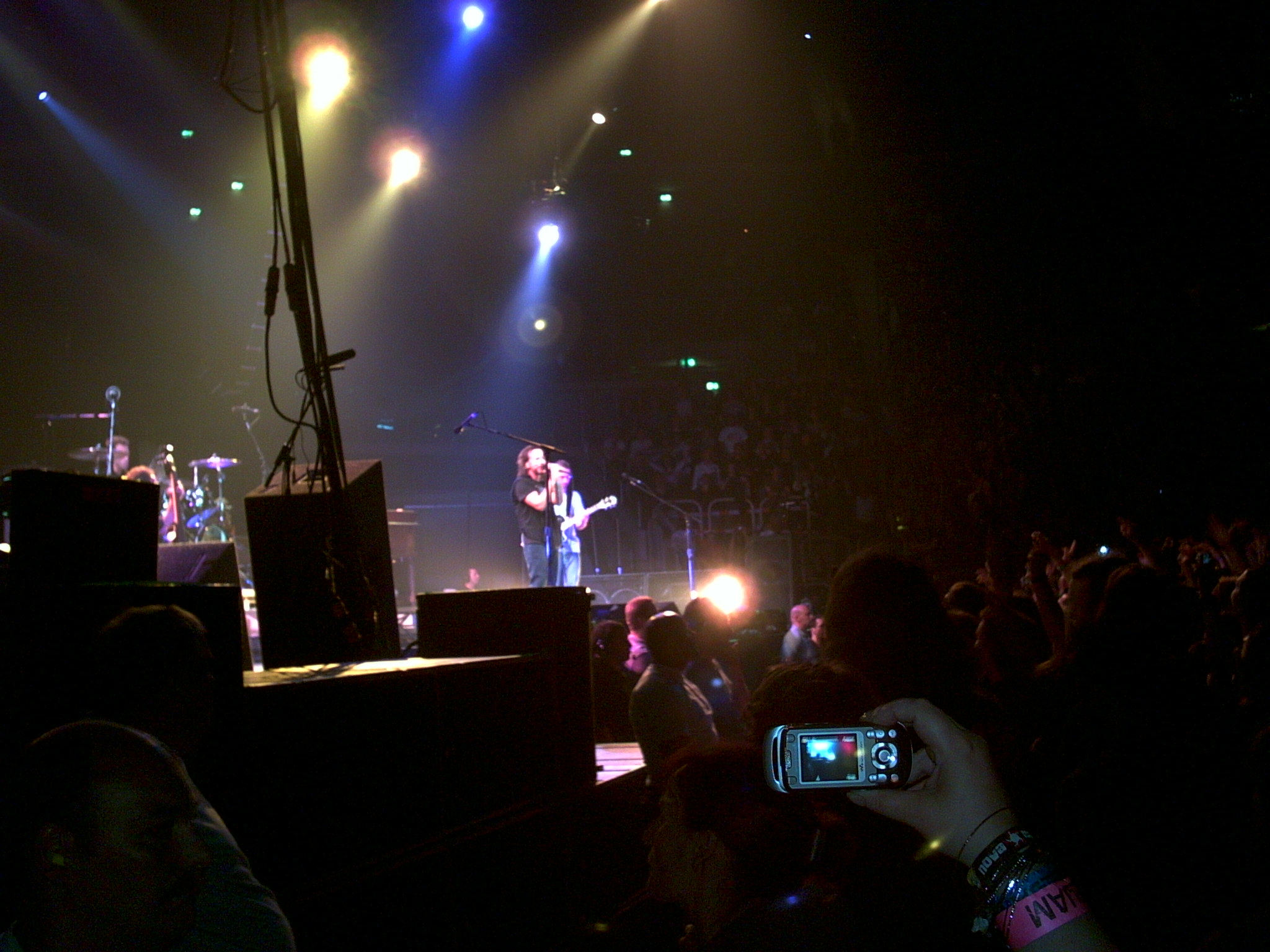
Pearl Jam in Düsseldorf, Germany on June 21, 2007.

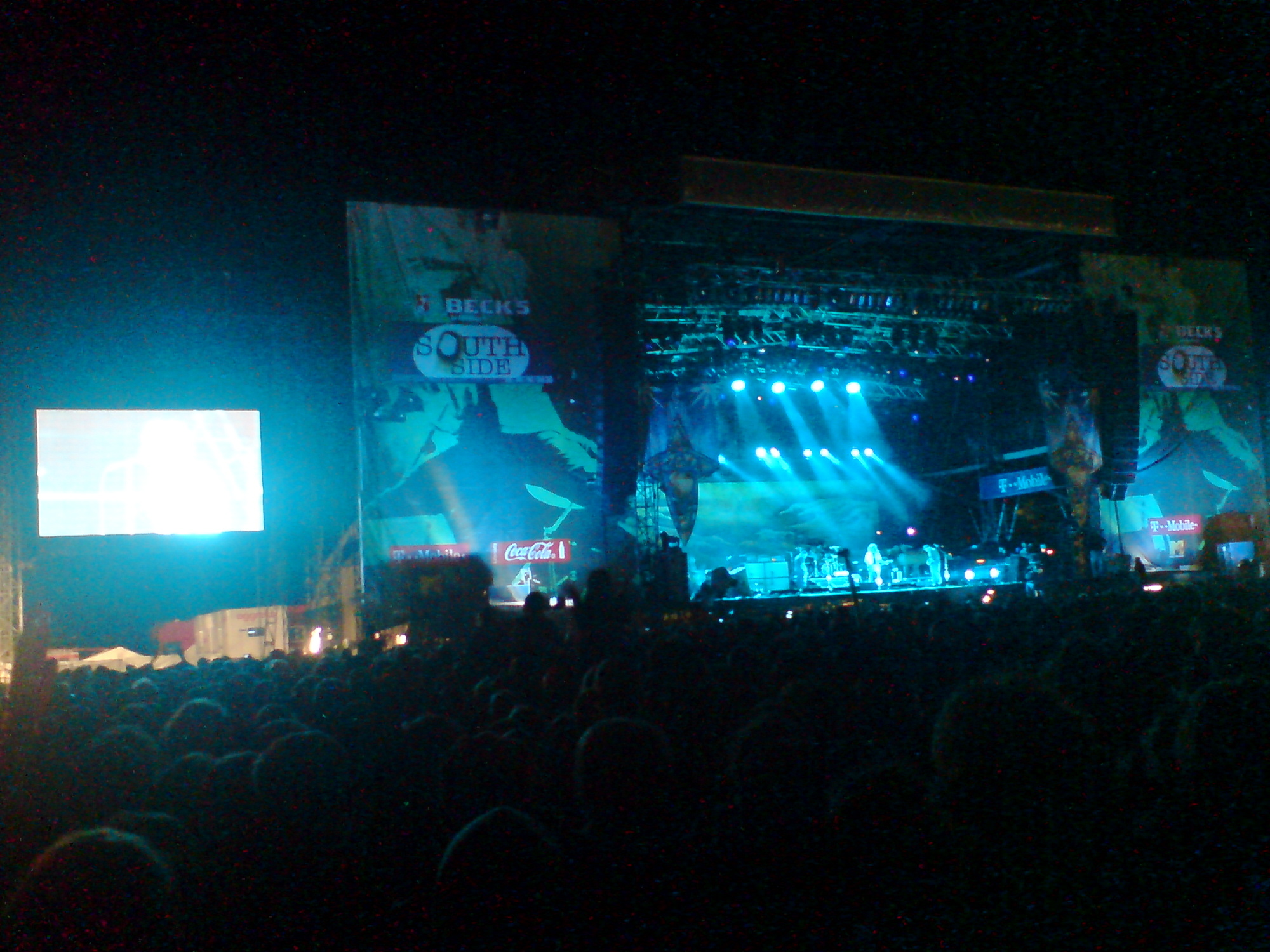
Pearl Jam in Neuhausen ob Eck, Germany on June 23, 2007.

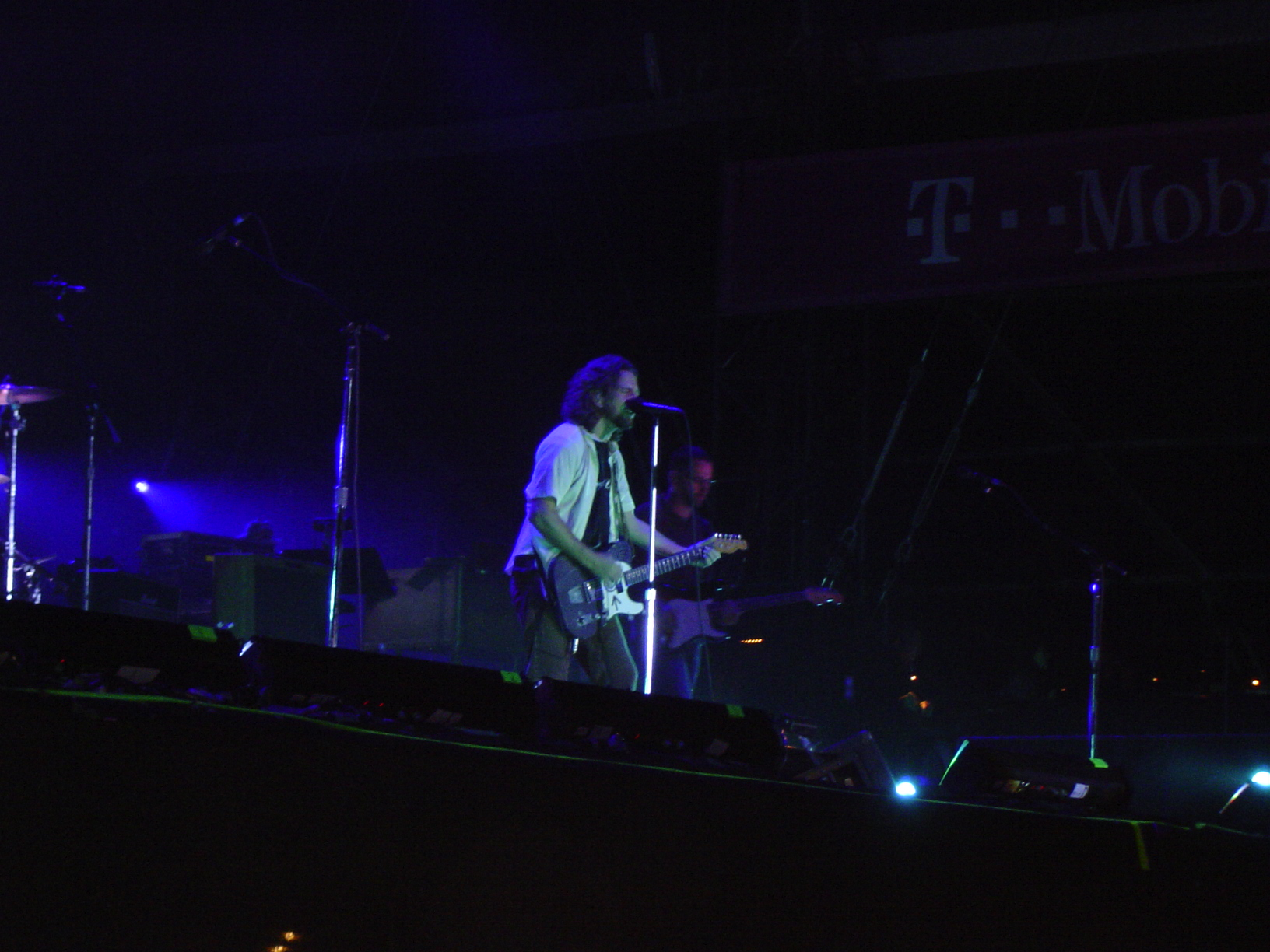
Pearl Jam in Neuhausen ob Eck, Germany on June 23, 2007.

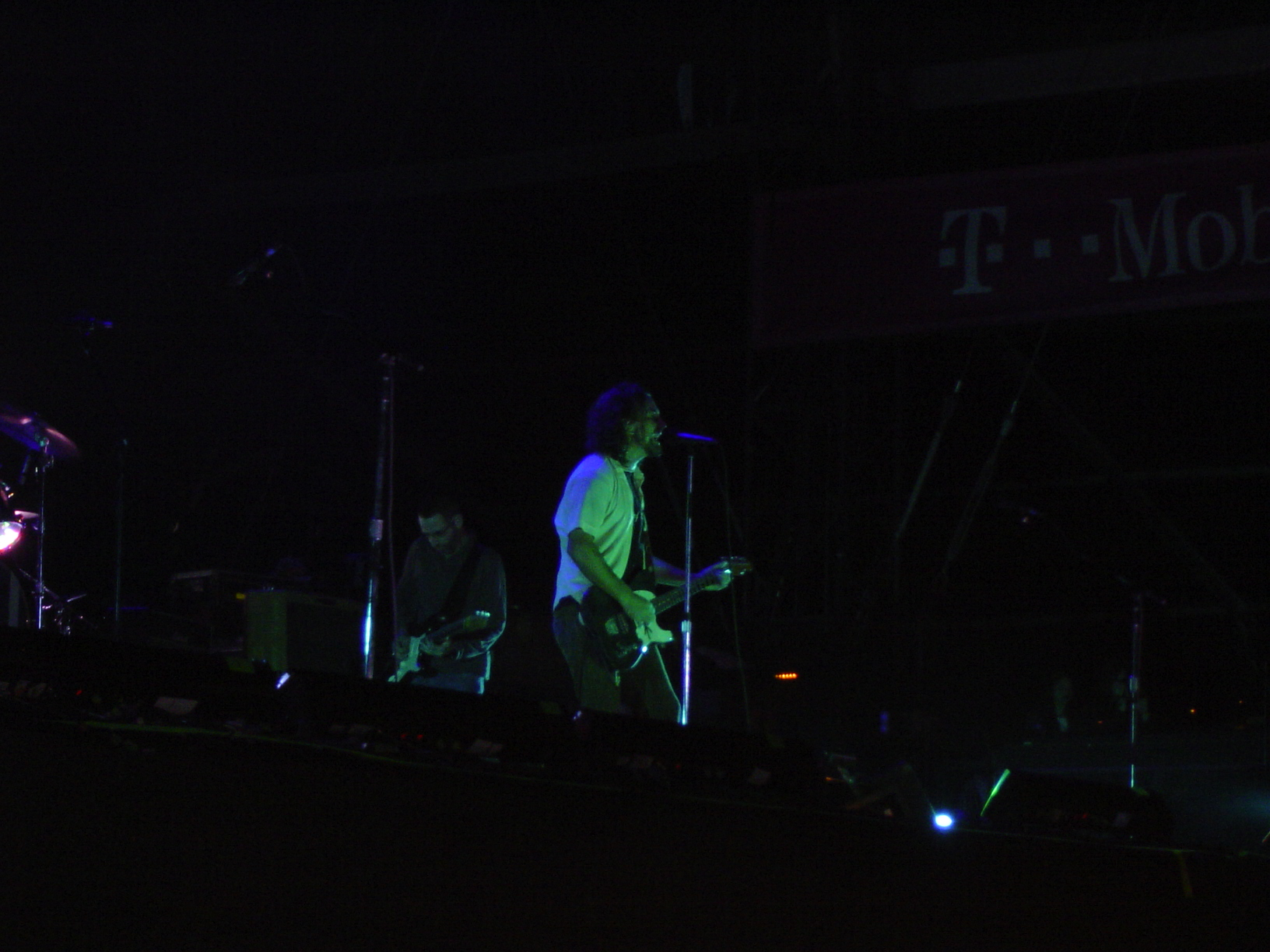
Pearl Jam in Neuhausen ob Eck, Germany on June 23, 2007.

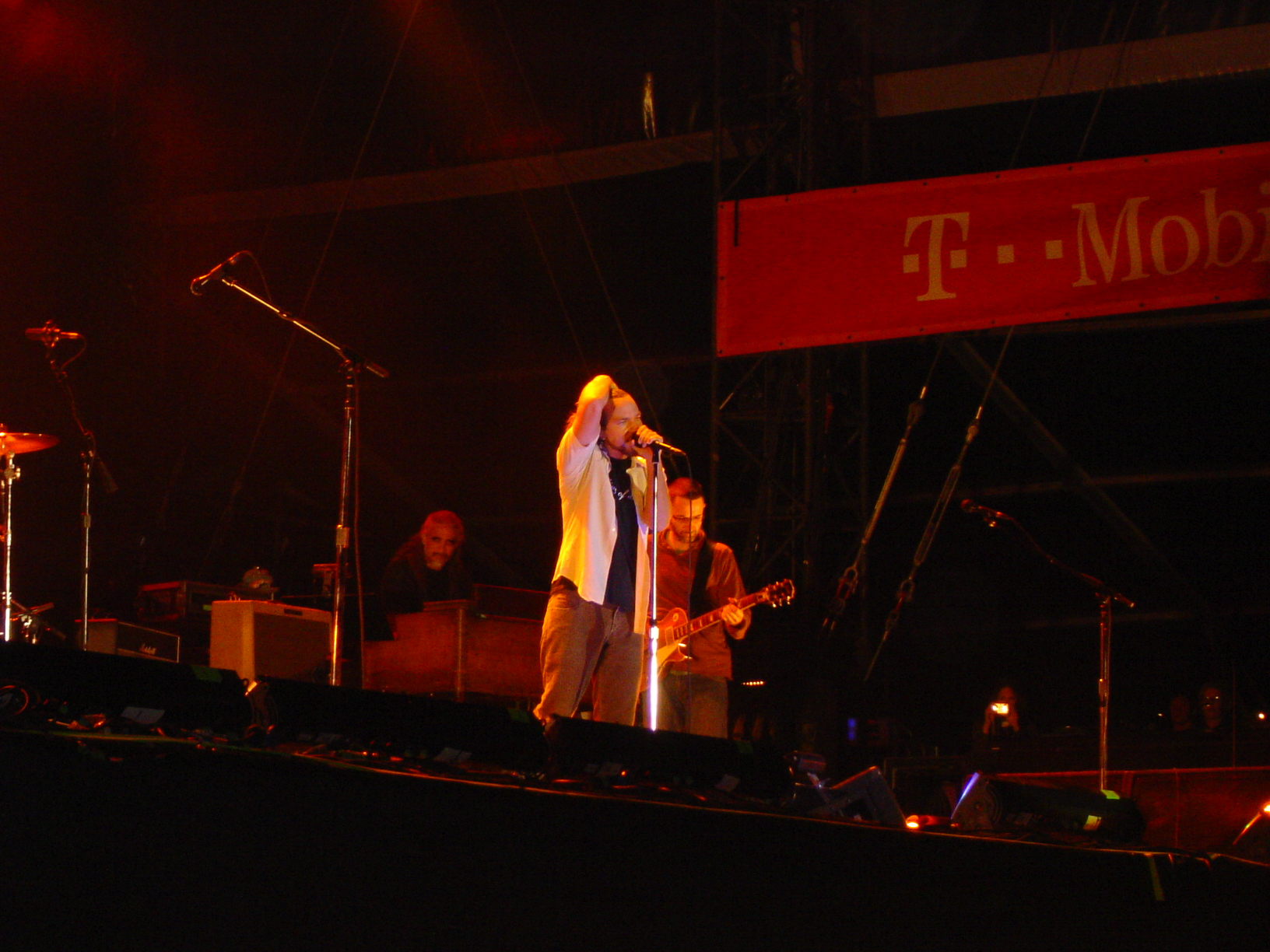
Pearl Jam in Neuhausen ob Eck, Germany on June 23, 2007.
