= Pearl Jam 2008 United States Tour =

2008 concert tour by Pearl Jam

2008 United States Tour
- Tour by Pearl Jam
- Location: United States
- Start date: June 11, 2008
- End date: June 30, 2008
- No. of shows: 14

Pearl Jam concert chronology
- 2007 European Tour (2007); 2008 United States Tour (2008); Backspacer Tour (2009–10)

The Pearl Jam 2008 United States Tour was a concert tour by the American rock band Pearl Jam.

== History ==
The tour of the United States consisted of thirteen dates which focused on the East Coast. The tour included a headlining appearance on June 14, 2008, at the Bonnaroo Music Festival. Pearl Jam's set at the festival overran by one hour, causing the next act, Kanye West, to take the stage at 4:25 a.m. local time. This was the band's only tour scheduled for 2008. After the tour had concluded, the band played a private benefit show at the Beacon Theatre in New York, which raised $3 million for the Robin Hood Foundation.

Official bootlegs are available for this tour through the band's official website in FLAC, MP3, and CD formats.

== Opening acts ==
- Kings of Leon (June 11–17, excluding June 14)
- Ted Leo and the Pharmacists (June 19–30)

== Tour dates ==
Date	City	Country	Venue
North America
June 11, 2008	West Palm Beach	United States	Cruzan Amphitheatre
June 12, 2008	Tampa	United States	St. Pete Times Forum
June 14, 2008^{[A]}	Manchester	United States	Great Stage Park
June 16, 2008	Columbia	United States	Colonial Life Arena
June 17, 2008	Virginia Beach	United States	Verizon Wireless Virginia Beach Amphitheater
June 19, 2008	Camden, New Jersey	United States	Susquehanna Bank Center
June 20, 2008	Camden, New Jersey	United States	Susquehanna Bank Center
June 22, 2008	Washington, D.C.	United States	Verizon Center
June 24, 2008	New York City	United States	Madison Square Garden
June 25, 2008	New York City	United States	Madison Square Garden
June 27, 2008	Hartford	United States	New England Dodge Music Center
June 28, 2008	Mansfield	United States	Comcast Center Amphitheatre
June 30, 2008	Mansfield	United States	Comcast Center Amphitheatre
July 1, 2008	New York City	United States	Beacon Theatre

Festivals and other miscellaneous performances
^{A} This concert was a part of "Bonnaroo Music Festival"

== Band members ==
Pearl Jam

- Jeff Ament – bass guitar
- Stone Gossard – rhythm guitar
- Mike McCready – lead guitar
- Eddie Vedder – lead vocals, guitar
- Matt Cameron – drums

Additional musicians

- Boom Gaspar – Hammond B3 and keyboards

== Gallery ==
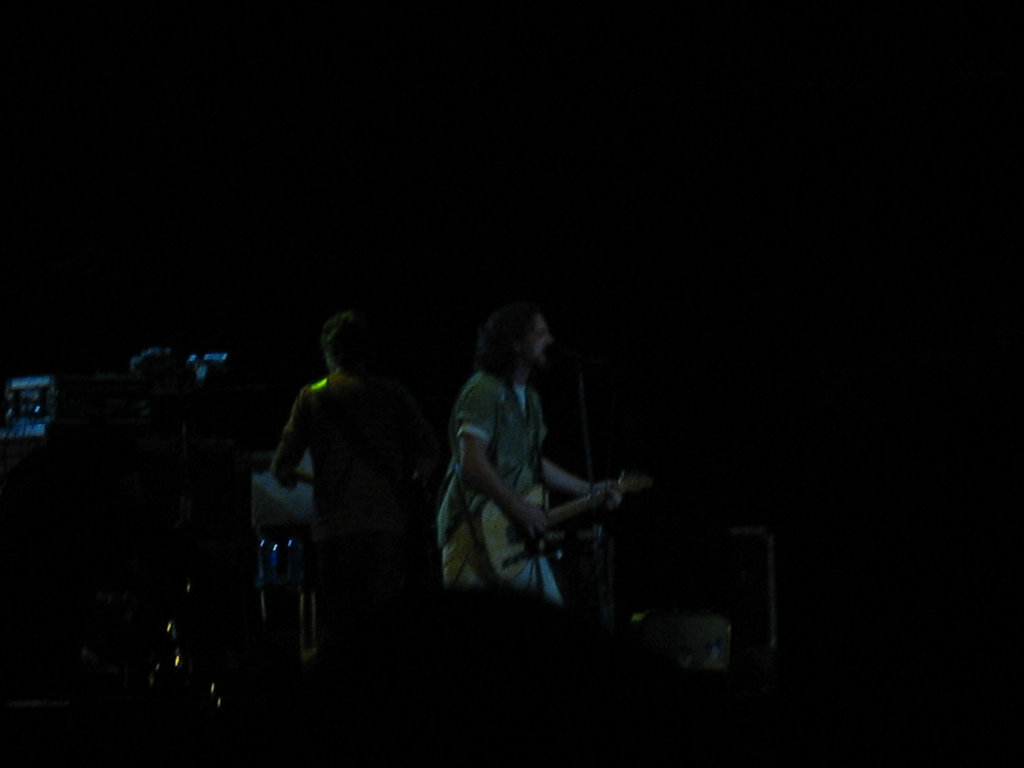
Pearl Jam in Manchester, Tennessee on June 14, 2008

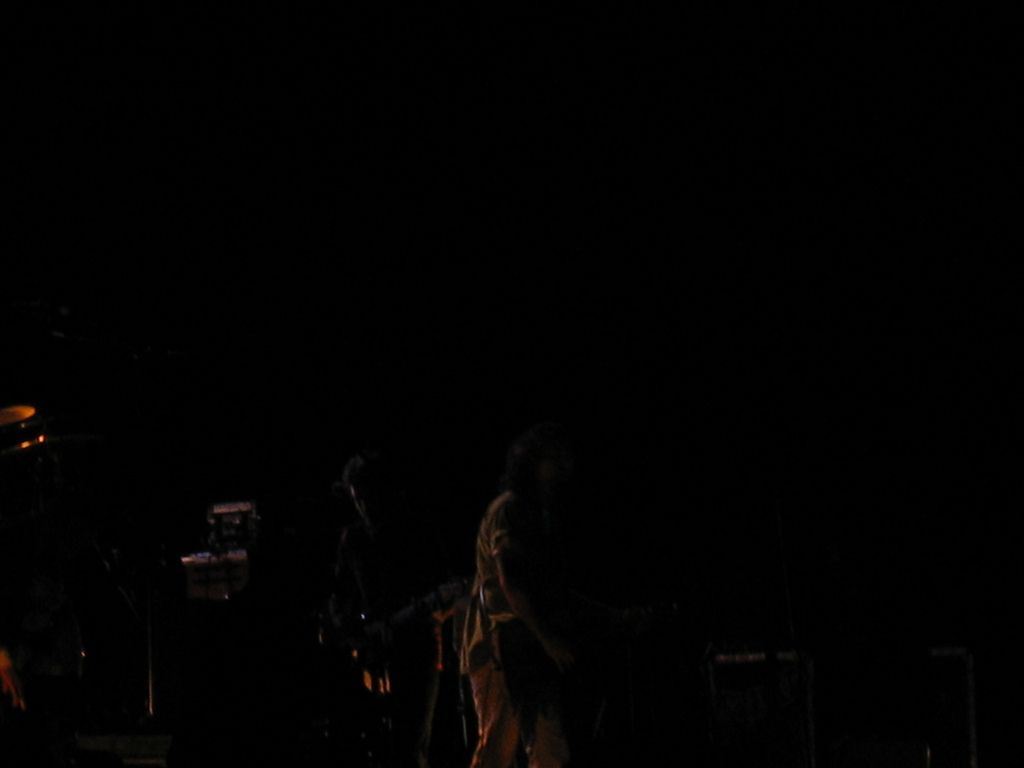
Pearl Jam in Manchester, Tennessee on June 14, 2008

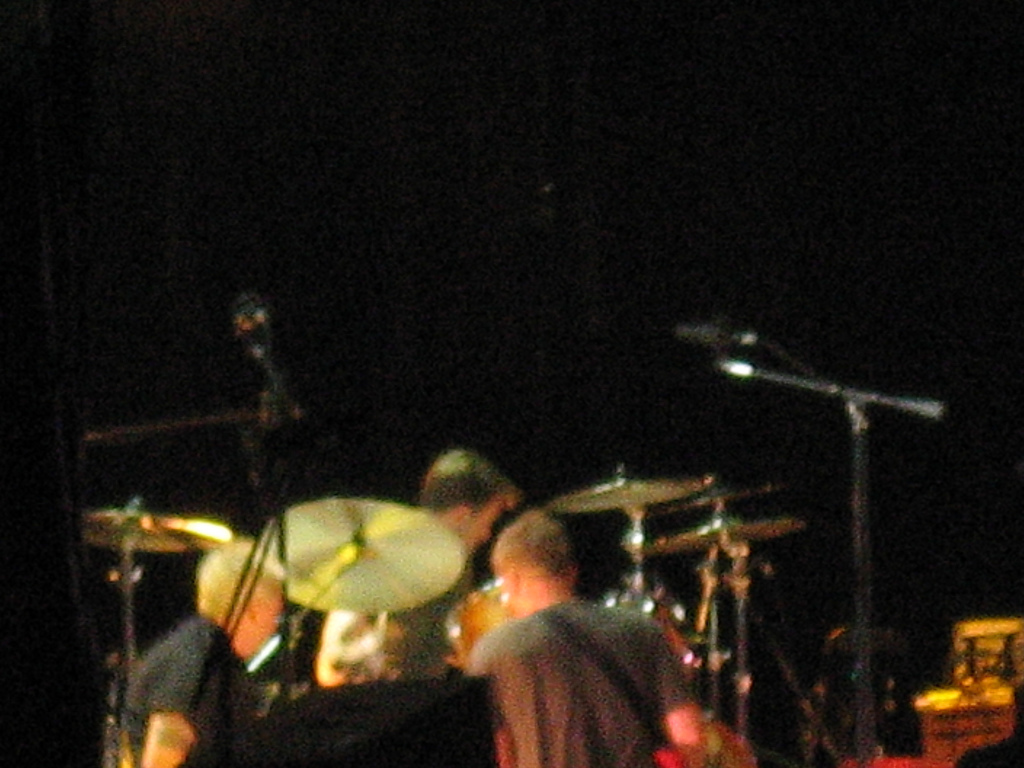
Pearl Jam in Manchester, Tennessee on June 14, 2008

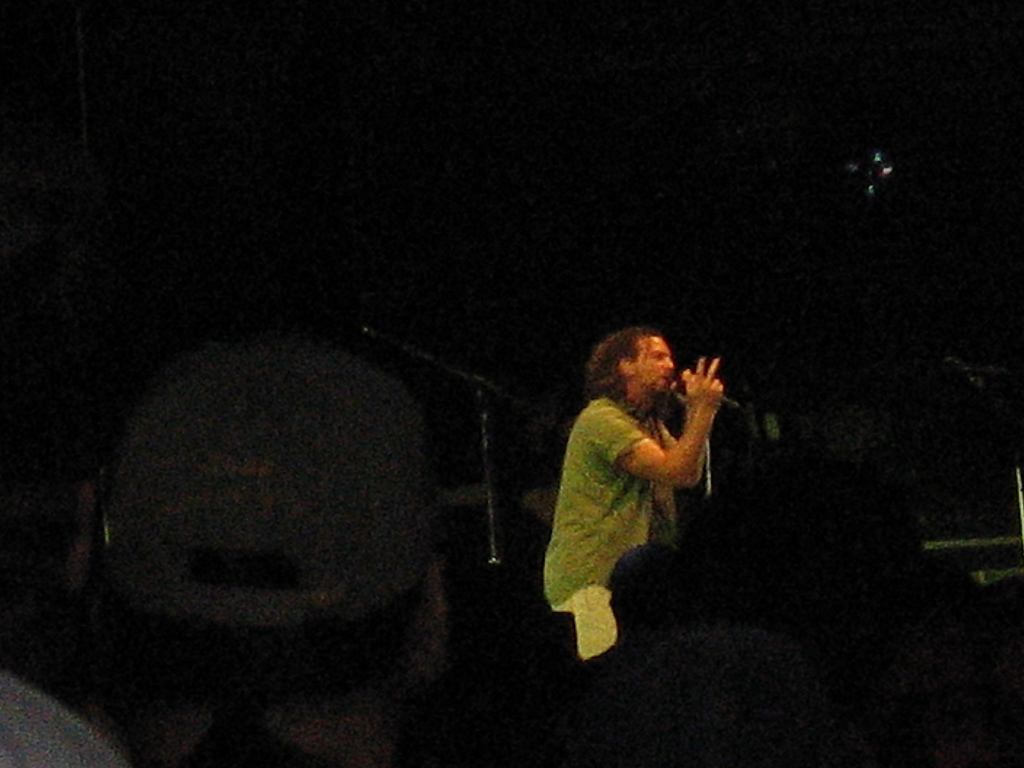
Eddie Vedder with Pearl Jam in Manchester, Tennessee on June 14, 2008

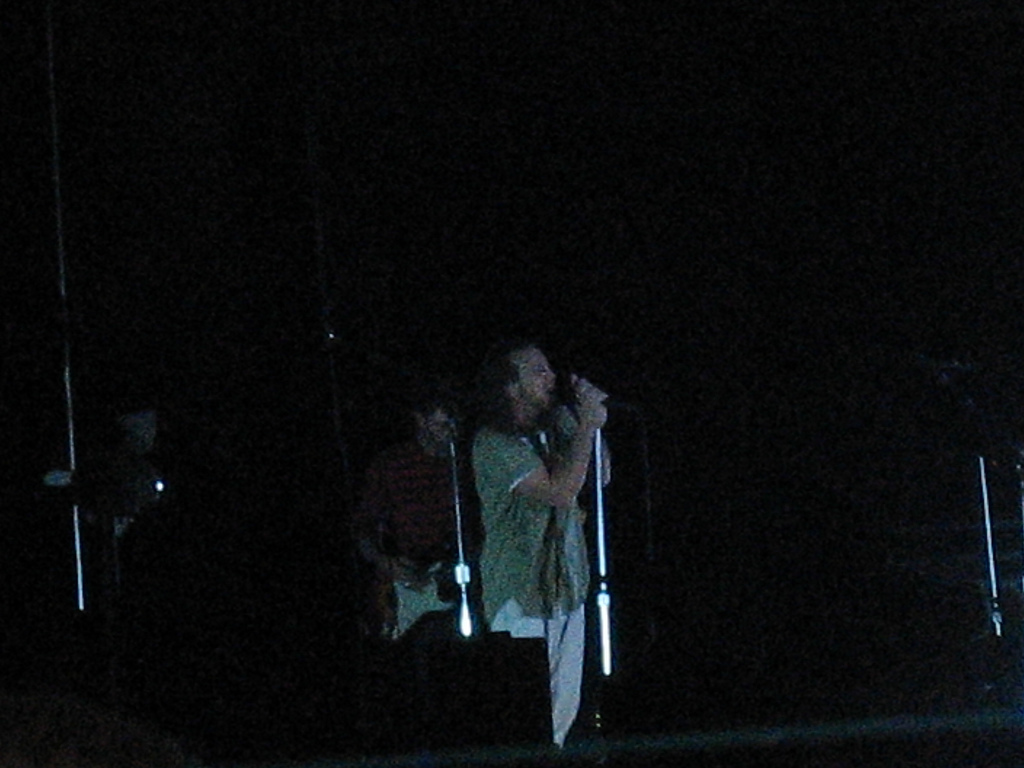
Pearl Jam in Manchester, Tennessee on June 14, 2008

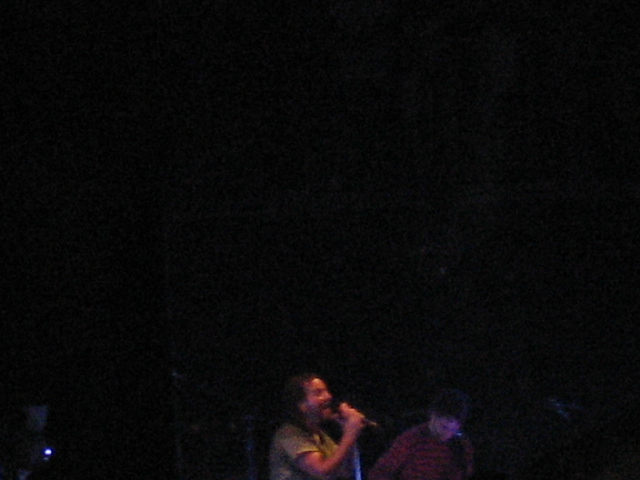
Pearl Jam in Manchester, Tennessee on June 14, 2008

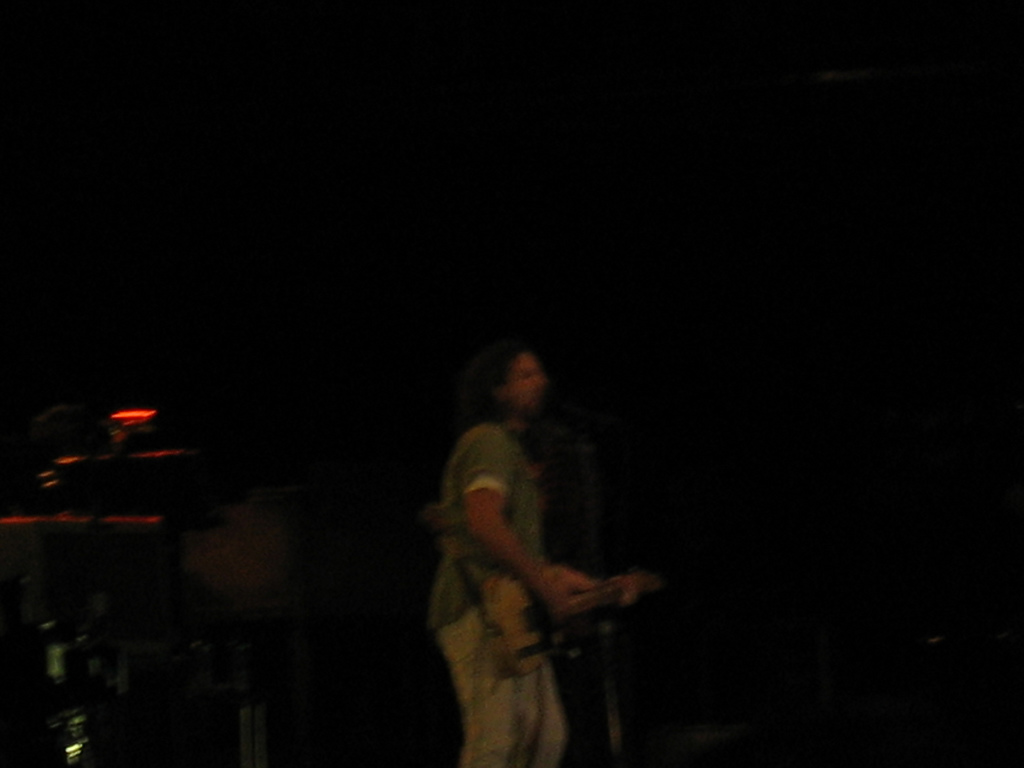
Pearl Jam in Manchester, Tennessee on June 14, 2008

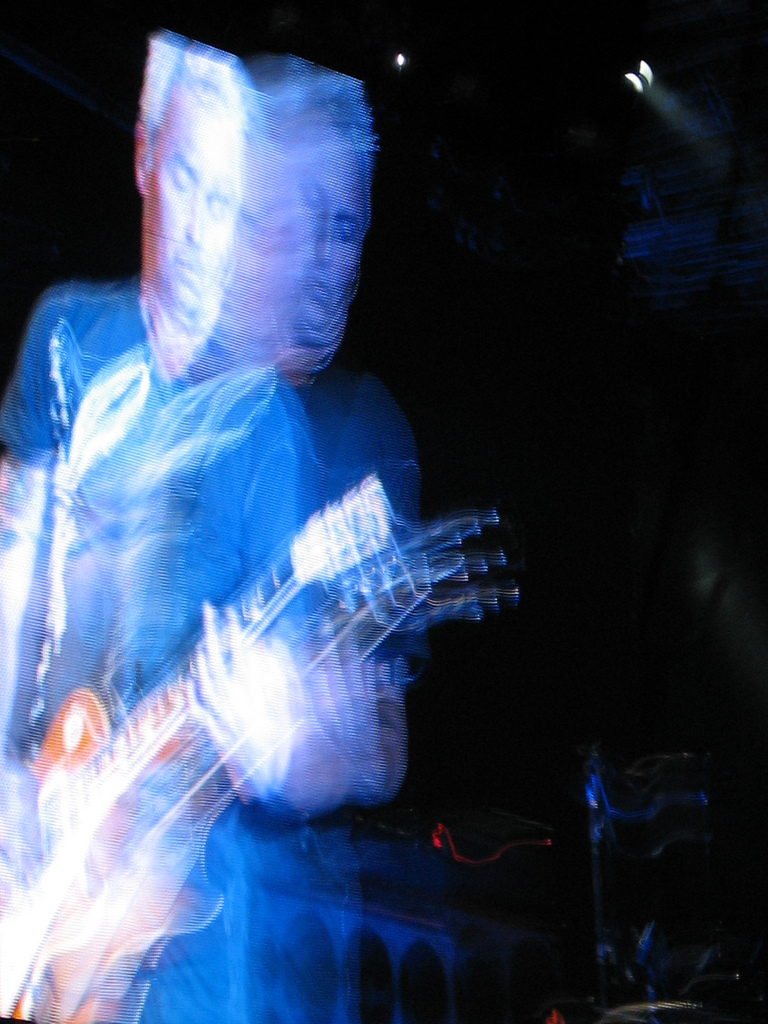
Mike McCready with Pearl Jam in Manchester, Tennessee on June 14, 2008

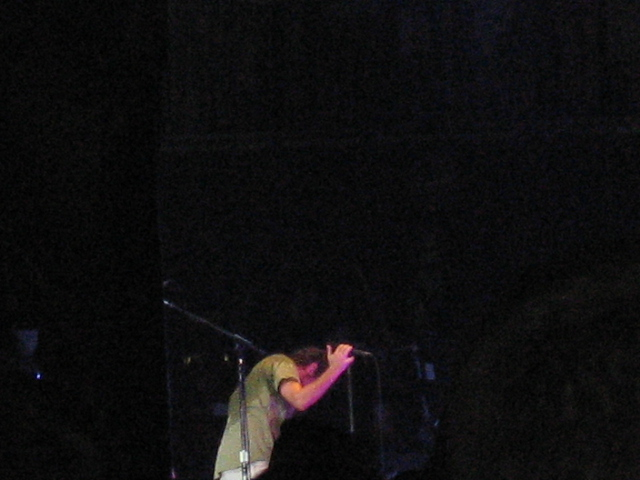
Eddie Vedder with Pearl Jam in Manchester, Tennessee on June 14, 2008

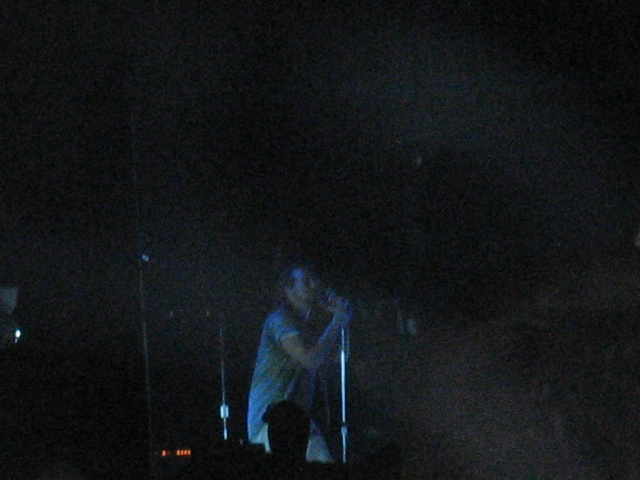
Eddie Vedder with Pearl Jam in Manchester, Tennessee on June 14, 2008

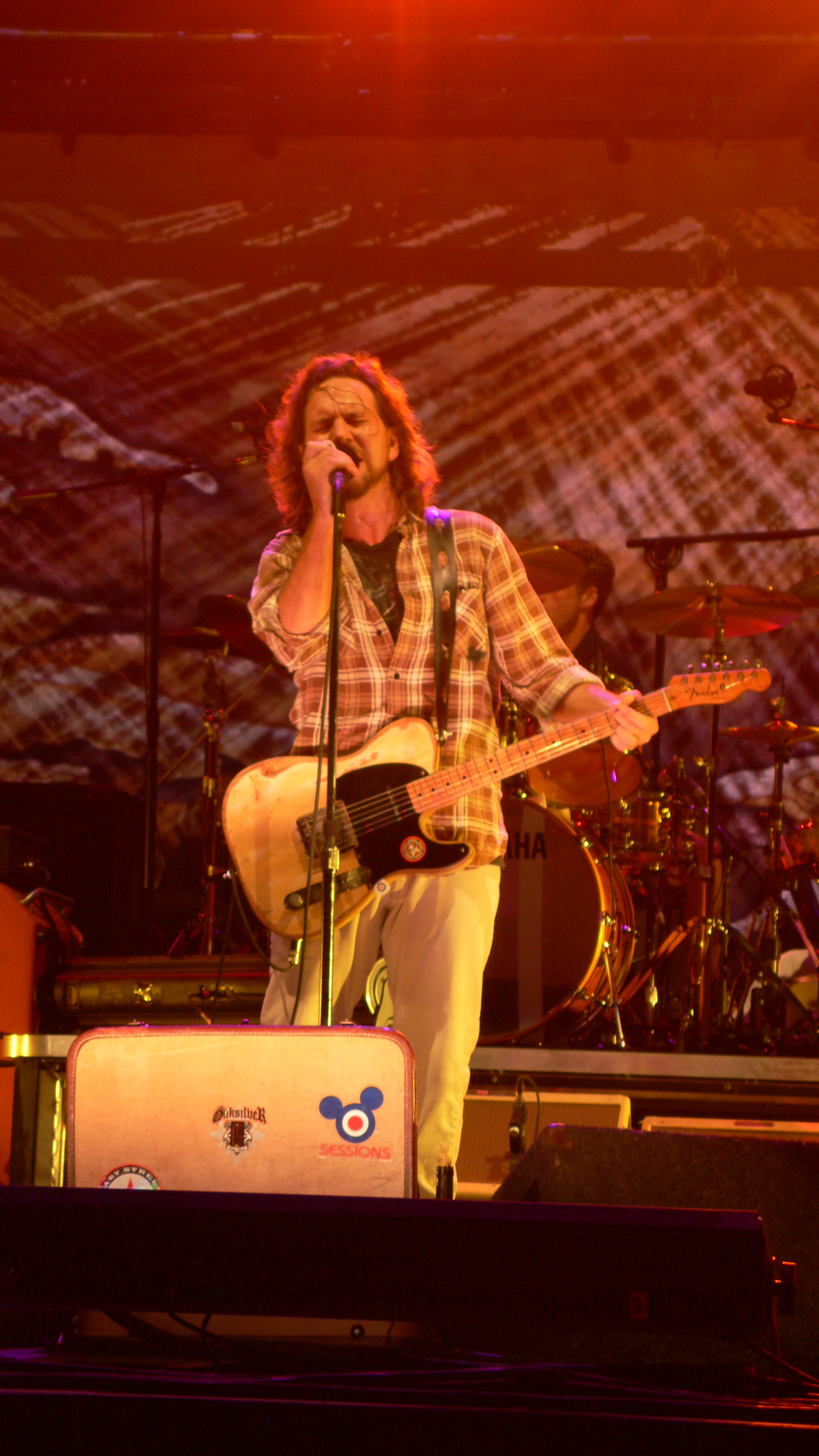
Pearl Jam in Virginia Beach, Virginia on June 17, 2008

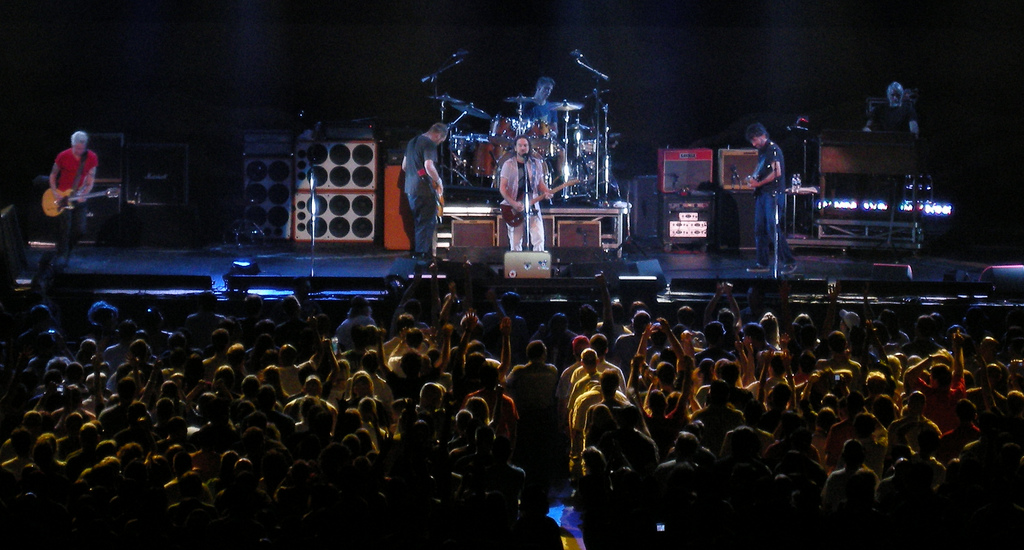
Pearl Jam in New York on June 24, 2008

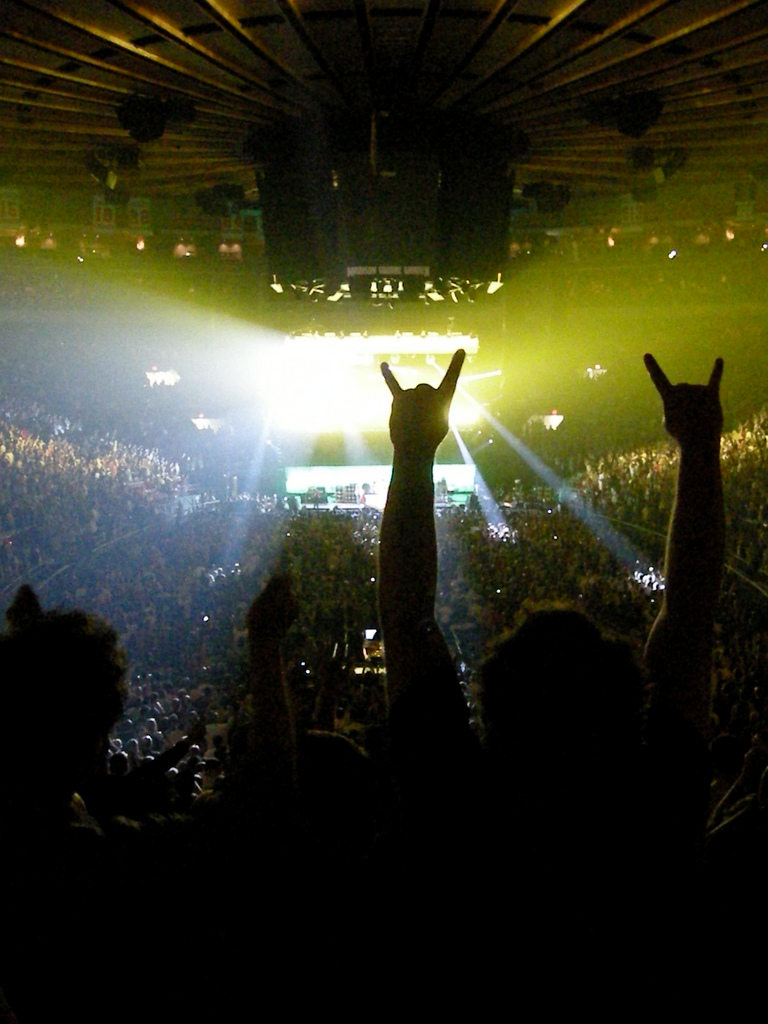
Pearl Jam in New York on June 24, 2008

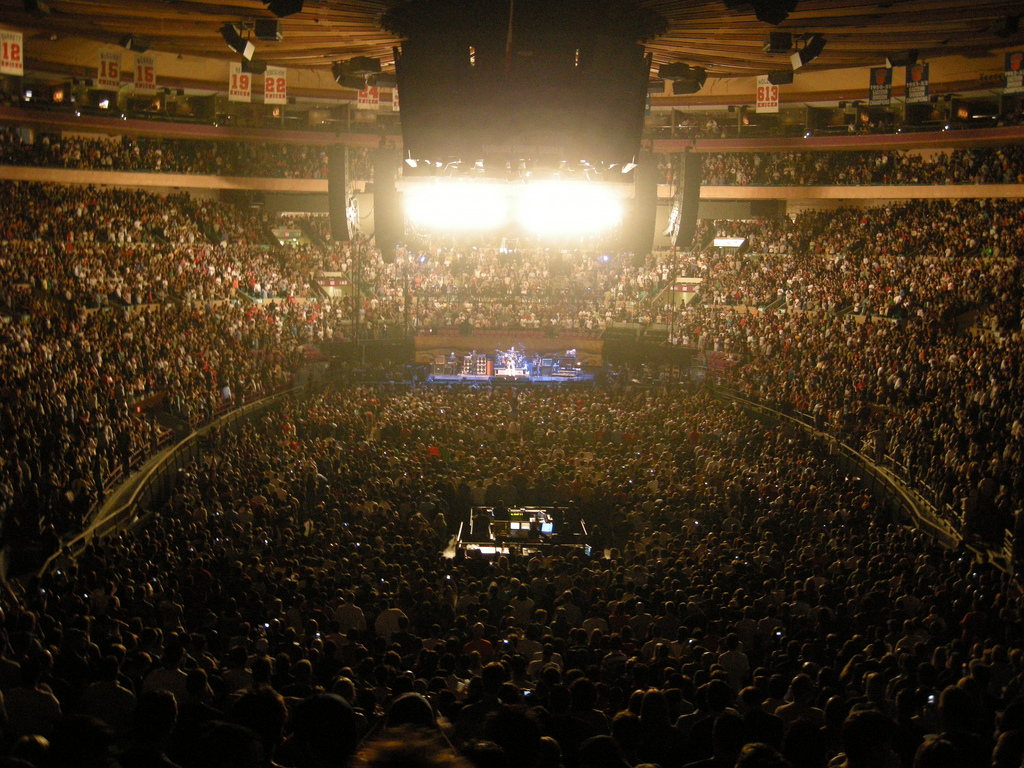
Pearl Jam in New York on June 24, 2008

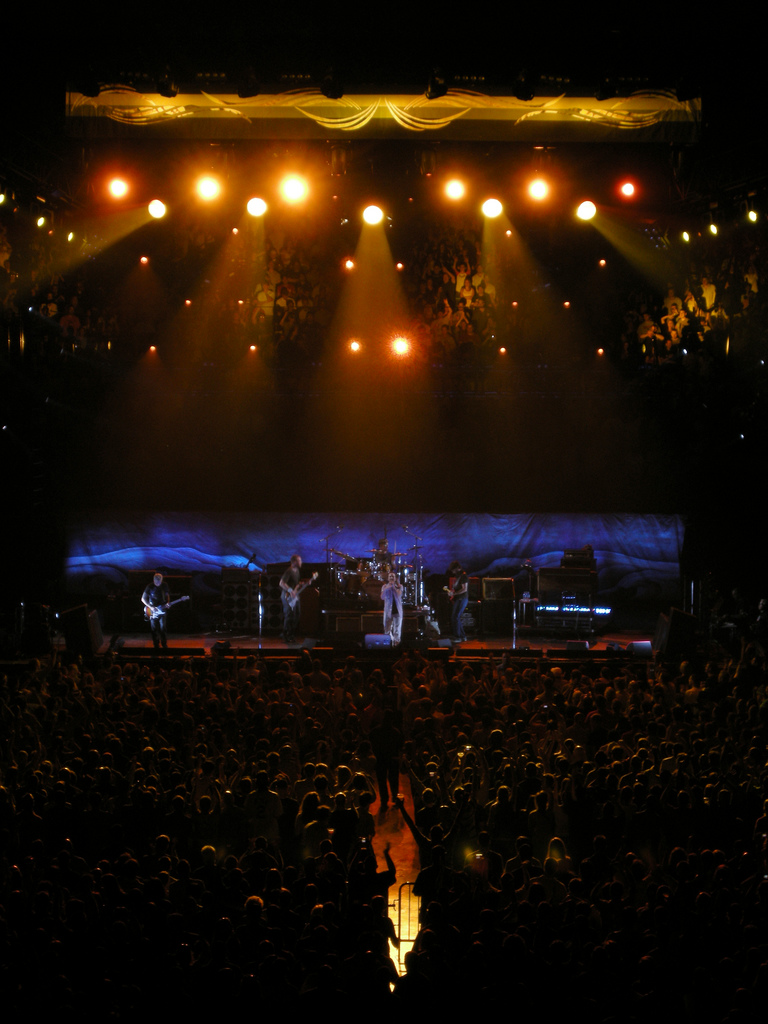
Pearl Jam in New York on June 24, 2008
