= Kevin Wood (guitarist) =

- Birth name: Kevin David Wood
- Born: September 16, 1961 (age 63); RAF Wroughton Air Force Base, Wiltshire, England
- Origin: Seattle, Washington, U.S.
- Genres: Alternative rock; grunge; glam metal
- Occupation: Musician
- Instruments: Guitar; vocals
- Years active: 1980–present
- Labels: C/Z; Loosegroove; Dekema Records
- Website: http://malfunkshun.org/home.html

Kevin David Wood (born September 16, 1961) is an American musician known for playing lead guitar in various Seattle-based bands he founded during the grunge era in the Pacific Northwest.

== Early life ==
Wood's siblings included younger brothers Brian and Andrew Wood. The Wood family lived the longest on Bainbridge Island, Washington, a short ferry ride from Seattle. All three brothers had musical aspirations; Kevin Wood played guitar, and both Andrew and Brian learned to sing. Over time, Kevin and his younger brothers formed several seminal Seattle bands including Malfunkshun, Mother Love Bone, the Fire Ants, and Devilhead.

== Malfunkshun (1980–1988) ==
In 1980 Kevin co-founded Malfunkshun with his youngest brother and lead singer Andrew Wood and drummer Regan Hagar. In 1986 the band contributed two tracks on the compilation Deep Six released by the Seattle-based record label C/Z Records. In addition to Malfunkshun, Deep Six also featured tracks from Green River, Soundgarden, the Melvins, and Skin Yard. Based on exposure from Deep Six's release, Malfunkshun began opening live shows for Soundgarden, Skin Yard, and the U-Men.

During their time together in Malfunkshun, Kevin, Andrew, and Regan, had recorded many eight-track studio demos, but never released a proper album. In 1995, Kevin and Regan worked with Stone Gossard to release a collection of these recordings, known as Return to Olympus, on Gossard's Loosegroove record label.

== The Fire Ants (1991–1992) ==
In 1991 Kevin Wood formed the Fire Ants with his brother Brian Wood as lead singer, former Nirvana member Chad Channing on drums, and Dan McDonald on bass. After signing with Seattle label Dekema Records, the band recorded demo tracks with engineer Marty Jourard, who was previously known for playing keyboards for the American new wave band the Motels.

After the demo sessions, the band entered Reciprocal Recording studio with producer Jack Endino, who is commonly known as the godfather of grunge for his work on seminal albums from bands like Nirvana, Mudhoney, and Soundgarden. These sessions reunited Endino and Chad Channing in the studio where they had previously recorded Nirvana's ‘Bleach’ together. Endino was assisted during the recordings by engineer Phil Ek who later went on to produce albums for Band of Horses, Fleet Foxes, and Mudhoney. The resulting release Stripped was a 6-track EP. In 2015, Dekema Records worked with Jack Endino to remaster Stripped's six original tracks and add nine unreleased tracks from the demo sessions with Jourard. The expanded album was released under the name Stripped (Deluxe Edition).

== Devilhead (1992–1996) ==
In 1992, following the break-up of the Fire Ants, Kevin Wood co-founded his new band Devilhead, working again with his brother Brian as lead singer. While the Wood brothers were the only permanent members of the band, contributors included Dan McDonald, formerly of the Fire Ants, and bassist John Waterman and guitarist John McBain, both from the band Hater. Devilhead released two albums, 'Your Ice Cream's Dirty' in 1994 and 'Pest Control' in 1996, on Stone Gossard's Loosegrove record label.

== Malfunkshun (2002–present) ==
Kevin Wood teamed up with Mother Love Bone drummer Greg Gilmore to reform Malfunkshun and record the 'Her Eyes' album in 2002.

Following that album, Wood teamed back up with original drummer Regan Hagar in 2006 and the two decided to record a new album using lyrics written by original lead singer Andy Wood. Wood contacted singer Shawn Smith (Brad, Satchel) to see if he would be interested in joining the band. According to Wood, Smith had recently had a dream about Andy Wood and was ready to join them the next day in the recording studio. The band, rounded out by bassist Cory Kane, recorded new songs using Andy's lyrics, a handful of vintage Malfunkshun tracks including 'Love Child' and 'My Love', and a reworked version of Mother Love Bone's 'Man of Golden Words'. While originally conceived as a Malfunkshun album, the band ultimately decided to release it under the band name 'Kevin Wood & From the North'. In acknowledgement of its legacy, the release was titled 'Malfunkshun Monument'. In 2021, the band released their newest album titled Glow with lead singer Jeff Stark.

== Side projects ==
- Malfunkshun: The Andrew Wood Story - Wood appeared in the documentary about his late brother singer Andy Wood.
- Brad - Wood joined the band occasionally for live shows starting in 2007 as an additional guitarist. Wood also played acoustic guitar for the band's Best Friends? album.
