= Return to Olympus =

Studio album by Malfunkshun
- Released: July 18, 1995
- Recorded: 1986–1987
- Studio: Reciprocal Recording
- Genre: Grunge
- Length: 58:14
- Label: Loosegroove
- Producer: Jack Endino

Professional ratings
Review scores
Source	Rating
AllMusic	4/5 stars

Return to Olympus is the debut studio album by the American rock band Malfunkshun and the only album to feature both original vocalist Andrew Wood (later of Mother Love Bone) and Kevin Wood (later of Devilhead). The album was released after the band had disbanded and following the death of Andrew Wood from a drug overdose in 1990. Stone Gossard of Pearl Jam compiled the songs and released the album on his and Malfunkshun drummer Regan Hagar's label, Loosegroove Records.

The band also covered Ted Nugent's song "Wang Dang Sweet Poontang".

== Track listing ==
All songs written by Andrew Wood except for "Wang Dang Sweet Poontang" which was written by Ted Nugent.

1. "Enter Landrew" – 2:50
2. "My Only Fan" – 4:23
3. "Mr. Liberty (With Morals)" – 3:25
4. "Jezebel Woman" – 4:31
5. "Shotgun Wedding" – 4:17
6. "Wang Dang Sweet Poontang" (Ted Nugent cover) – 3:20
7. "Until the Ocean" – 2:54
8. "I Wanna Be Yo Daddy" – 4:56
9. "Winter Bites" – 7:38
10. "Make Sweet Love"/"Region" – 5:05
11. "Luxury Bed (The Rocketship Chair)" – 4:58
12. "Exit Landrew" - 1:50

Tracks 13-32 are empty and do not have any audio in them.

33. "With Yo' Heart Not Yo' Hands (Live)" – 6:35 (unlisted in track listing)

Personnel

- Andrew Wood - vocals, bass
- Kevin Wood - guitars
- Regan Hagar - drums
