= United We Stand (Brad album) =

2012 album

Studio album by Brad
- Released: April 24, 2012
- Genre: Alternative rock
- Length: 40:17
- Language: English
- Label: Razor & Tie

Brad chronology
Best Friends? (2010)	United We Stand (2012)	In the Moment That You're Born (2023)

Professional ratings
Review scores
Source	Rating
AllMusic	3/5 stars
Classic Rock	7/10 stars
Consequence of Sound	2.5/5 stars

United We Stand is the fifth studio album by the American band Brad. It was released on April 24, 2012. To promote the album the band toured, including their first ever shows in the United Kingdom. It was the final studio album to feature frontman Shawn Smith in his lifetime, who died in April 2019.

== Track listing ==
No.	Title	Length
1.	"Miles of Rope"	3:37
2.	"Bound in Time"	5:24
3.	"A Reason to Be in My Skin"	4:55
4.	"Diamond Blues"	3:06
5.	"The Only Way"	3:30
6.	"Last Bastion"	3:32
7.	"Make the Pain Go Away"	3:23
8.	"Needle and Thread"	4:33
9.	"Tea Bag"	2:50
10.	"Through the Day"	5:27

European bonus track
No.	Title	Length
11.	"Waters Deep"	4:25

iTunes deluxe edition bonus tracks
No.	Title	Length
11.	"Thomas Jefferson Son"	4:33
12.	"Thomas Jefferson Son" (video)	6:20
13.	"Peaceful Waters" (video)	3:43
14.	"Don't Cry (Neil Young)" (video)	4:29
15.	"Let It Breathe" (video)	6:47

== Personnel ==
Brad

- Stone Gossard – electric guitar (tracks 1–6), guitar solo (track 8), lead guitar (track 9)
- Regan Hagar – drums (tracks 1, 3–6, 9), electric guitar (track 9), B3 synthesizer (track 9)
- Shawn Smith – vocals; percussion (tracks 1–3, 8, 10), organ (tracks 1–3), drums (tracks 2, 8, 10), 12-string acoustic guitar (track 5), keyboards (track 5), piano (tracks 5, 8, 10), electric guitar (tracks 7, 10)
- Keith Lowe – bass (tracks 1–8)

Additional Personnel

- Happy Chichester – electric guitar (tracks 1, 3, 4)
- Bashiri Johnson – percussion (tracks 2, 7)
- Hans Teuber – horns (track 5)
- Mike Berg – bass (track 9)
