= Best Friends? =

Studio album by Brad
- Released: August 10, 2010
- Recorded: 2003
- Genre: Alternative rock
- Length: 48:24
- Label: Monkeywrench, Inc.

Brad chronology
Brad vs Satchel (2005)	Best Friends? (2010)	United We Stand (2012)

Best Friends? is the fourth studio album by the American rock band Brad. It was recorded in 2003 after the band's return from an Australian tour. It was released on August 10, 2010, through Monkeywrench Inc.

== Track listing ==
No.	Title	Writer(s)	Length
1.	"Price of Love"	Shawn Smith	3:46
2.	"Without Regret"	Smith; Brad	5:58
3.	"Rush Hour"	Smith; Mike Berg	4:58
4.	"Believe in Yourself"	Smith	4:28
5.	"Every Whisper"	Stone Gossard	4:38
6.	"One Love Remaining"	Smith	5:05
7.	"Low"	Gossard	3:20
8.	"Oh My Goodness"	Smith; Gossard	2:32
9.	"Luxury Car"	Smith	2:53
10.	"Bless Me Father"	Smith; Gossard	3:50
11.	"Holiday"	Gossard	3:45
12.	"Runnin' for Cover"	Smith; Berg	3:11
Total length:			48:24

== Personnel ==
Brad

- Stone Gossard – guitar (1, 5, 8, 10–12), drums (2), bass guitar (7), painting
- Regan Hagar – drums (1, 3–8, 11, 12), slide guitar (2), key flute (9), B3 (10), package design
- Shawn Smith – vocals, piano (1, 4, 9), keyboards (4, 6), bass guitar (2, 8), guitar (2, 3), drums (10)
- Mike Berg – bass guitar (1, 3–5, 10–12), keyboards (2, 4, 7, 8), guitar (2, 3), piano (3, 11)

Additional musicians

- Hans Teuber – flute (5)
- Kevin Wood – acoustic guitar (6)
- Lonnie Marshall – bass guitar (7)

Production

- Barrett Jones – mixing
- Brad – production
- Ed Brooks at RFI – mastering
- Anna Knowlden – photos
- Floyd Reitsma – assistance, engineering
