= Beautiful Girls (film) =

1996 film directed by Ted Demme

- Theatrical release poster
- Directed by: Ted Demme
- Written by: Scott Rosenberg
- Produced by: Cary Woods
- Starring: Matt Dillon; Noah Emmerich; Annabeth Gish; Lauren Holly; Timothy Hutton; Rosie O'Donnell; Max Perlich; Martha Plimpton; Natalie Portman; Michael Rapaport; Mira Sorvino; Uma Thurman; Pruitt Taylor Vince
- Cinematography: Adam Kimmel
- Edited by: Jeffrey Wolf
- Music by: David A. Stewart
- Distributed by: Miramax Films
- Release date: February 9, 1996
- Running time: 112 minutes
- Country: United States
- Language: English
- Box office: $27 million

Beautiful Girls is a 1996 American romantic comedy-drama film directed by Ted Demme and written by Scott Rosenberg. Its story follows New York jazz pianist Willie Conway, as he heads back to his hometown of Knight's Ridge, Massachusetts for his high school reunion, where he finds his friends evaluating their lives and relationships.

The film stars Matt Dillon, Noah Emmerich, Lauren Holly, Timothy Hutton, Rosie O'Donnell, Martha Plimpton, Natalie Portman, Michael Rapaport, Mira Sorvino and Uma Thurman. It was produced by Cary Woods and was released on February 9, 1996, by Miramax Films. It received positive reviews and grossed $27 million worldwide.

== Plot ==
New York jazz pianist Willie returns to his hometown of Knight's Ridge, Massachusetts for his 10-year high school reunion, staying with his widower father and younger brother.

Willie reunites with three old friends: Mo is a successful family man, while Paul and Tommy, who own a snowplowing business, have relationship issues. Paul was recently dumped by his longtime girlfriend Jan because he refused her ultimatum of marriage. Believing that she is now seeing Victor the meat cutter, he vindictively blocks her driveway with snow every night. Tommy is cheating on his girlfriend Sharon with his married high school sweetheart Darian.

Willie meets 13-year-old neighbor girl Marty, and they strike up a witty rapport. She presses him about his relationship: he has been with his girlfriend Tracy for a year but is unsure if he wants to marry her. He is considering taking a steady job as a salesman, but Mo urges him not to quit his music.

Paul desperately proposes to Jan, but she turns him down. Sharon argues with Tommy about his infidelity and seeks advice from her girlfriends. The outspoken Gina advises her to break up with Tommy, but Sharon tries to salvage the relationship by planning a surprise birthday party.

When the attractive Andera comes to town from Chicago, the guys compete for her attention. The next day, Gina lectures Willie and Tommy about men's unrealistic expectations of women set by supermodels and pornography. Willie feels jealous when he sees that Marty has a boyfriend.

Darian shows up at Tommy's surprise party drunk and openly tries to seduce him, causing Sharon to leave, heartbroken. Tommy drives Darian home but refuses her advances, and unsuccessfully tries to patch things up with Sharon. Willie tells Mo about his feelings for Marty but is reminded how young she is and says that he just doesn't want to grow up.

Willie again encounters Marty, who says she has broken up with her boyfriend because she is interested in him, asking him to wait five years until she is 18 and they can be together. Willie declines, saying that she will outgrow her feelings for him as she matures.

Paul takes Andera out, trying to make Jan jealous. Andera plays along, but when Paul tries to kiss her she smacks him and leaves. Willie chastises Paul about his obsession with supermodels; he responds that beautiful girls represent hope and promise. Tommy breaks things off with Darian, but she states her intent to win him back at the reunion.

Andera approaches Willie, turning down his flirtations but accompanying him to Paul's ice shanty, where they discuss their respective relationships. He misses the emotional rush of new love, but she feels truly happy with her boyfriend and returns to Chicago the next day. Tracy arrives from New York, and Willie's feelings for her are rekindled. Marty is downhearted by this, but Willie assures her that she will grow up to do amazing things.

At the reunion, Darian is confronted by a former classmate who she bullied; he tells her that she was beautiful, but "mean as a snake". Tommy skips the reunion to avoid Darian but encounters her husband Steve and his friends at a bar. Steve reveals he knows about the affair; a fight ensues, and Tommy is badly beaten. Learning of this, the guys rush to Steve's house to confront him. Steve calls his friends, but Willie pushes their car into a snowbank using Paul's snowplow. Mo is about to beat Steve up but stops when Steve's daughter comes to the door. Darian arrives home in the aftermath of the confrontation. Tommy ends up in the hospital with a concussion and two broken ribs. Sharon stays with him overnight, and they make up. Paul, overcome with emotion, clears Jan's driveway of snow.

Willie says his goodbyes the next day, having decided to head back to New York with Tracy and not take the sales job. Paul announces that Jan and Victor are engaged. Willie introduces Tracy to Marty and kisses Marty on the cheek before departing.

== Cast ==
- Matt Dillon as Tommy "Birdman" Rowland, a former high school football star turned snowplower
- Noah Emmerich as Michael "Mo" Morris, a textile plant manager and family man
- Annabeth Gish as Tracy Stover, an attorney and Willie Conway's girlfriend
- Lauren Holly as Darian Smalls, Tommy's high school girlfriend, now married with a daughter and having an affair with Tommy
- Timothy Hutton as Willie Conway, a New York City pianist visiting his hometown
- Rosie O'Donnell as Gina Barrisano, the outspoken friend of several of the characters
- Max Perlich as Kev, a snowplower employed by Tommy and Paul
- Martha Plimpton as Jan, Paul Kirkwood's ex-girlfriend
- Natalie Portman as Marty, the Conways' 13-year-old neighbor, a witty, self-described "old soul" who connects with Willie
- Michael Rapaport as Paul Kirkwood, a snowplower
- Mira Sorvino as Sharon Cassidy, Tommy's girlfriend
- Uma Thurman as Andera, Stanley Womack's attractive cousin from Chicago
- Pruitt Taylor Vince as Stanley "Stinky" Womack, proprietor of a local bar
- Anne Bobby as Sarah Morris, Mo's wife
- Sam Robards as Steve Rossmore, Darian's husband
- David Arquette as Bobby Conway, Willie's younger brother
- Richard Bright as Dick Conway, Willie's father
- Adam LeFevre as Victor the meat cutter, who is dating Jan
- John Carroll Lynch as Frank Womack, a bartender
- Tom Gibis as "Peter the Eater", a former classmate of Darian's whom she bullied about his weight
- John Scurti as a Greyhound Lines ticket agent
- Greg Dulli, lead singer of the Afghan Whigs, as himself in a scene with the band performing
- Harold "Happy" Chichester, lead singer of Howlin' Maggie, as himself in a scene with the band performing

Additional minor roles were played by Kristen Rossmore as Steve and Darian's daughter Kristen; Camille D'Ambrose as Sharon's mother; Martin Ruben as Jan's restaurant boss Chip; Allison Levine as a waitress; Earl R. Burt as a bartender; Trent Nicholas Thompson and Nicole Ranallo as Mo and Sarah's children Michael and Cheryl; Joyce Lacey and Matthew Nathen Castens as classmates at the reunion; Ollie Osterberg, Sterling Robson, and Edward Kaspszak as Steve's friends who beat up Tommy; Herbert Ade as a bar owner; Ben Gooding as a customer; and Frank Anello as Irv. "Lucky the Saint Bernard" is credited as Paul's dog "Elle Macpherson", named after the supermodel.

== Production ==
Screenwriter Scott Rosenberg was living in Needham, Massachusetts, waiting to see if Disney would use his script for Con Air. He said in an interview, "It was the worst winter ever in this small hometown. Snow plows were coming by, and I was just tired of writing these movies with people getting shot and killed. So I said, 'There is more action going on in my hometown with my friends dealing with the fact that they cannot deal with turning 30 or with commitment'—all that became Beautiful Girls."

Originally, James L. Brooks was interested in directing the film, according to actress Leslie Mann, who auditioned for a role but was not cast.

Ted Demme had the entire cast come to Minneapolis and live together for two to three weeks so that they could bond. Filming took place in the Twin Cities Metro Area communities of Edina, Marine-on-St. Croix and Stillwater, with Demme wanting to make sure that the setting was a character unto itself. He "wanted to make it look like it's Anytown USA, primarily East Coast. And I also wanted it to feel like a real working-class town". To this end, Demme drew inspiration from Michael Cimino's The Deer Hunter (1978). "The first third of the film is really an amazing buddy movie with those five actors. You could tell they were best friends, but they all had stuff amongst them that was personal to each one of them".

Principal photography took place between February and May 1995.

== Soundtrack ==
Beautiful Girls: Music from the Motion Picture

Soundtrack album by Various artists
- Released: January 30, 1996
- Genre: Soundtrack
- Length: 57:16
- Label: Elektra

Professional ratings
Review scores
Source	Rating
AllMusic	3/5 stars

No.	Title	Writer(s)	Artist	Length
1.	"That's How Strong My Love Is"	Roosevelt Jamison	Roland Gift	6:18
2.	"Be for Real"	Frederick Knight	Afghan Whigs	4:16
3.	"Easy to Be Stupid"	Harold Chichester	Howlin' Maggie	4:51
4.	"Me and Mrs. Jones"	Kenny Gamble; Cary Gilbert; Leon Huff	Billy Paul	4:48
5.	"Suffering"	Regan Hagar; Shawn Smith; John Hoag; Cory Kane	Satchel	4:49
6.	"Graduation Day"	Chris Isaak	Chris Isaak	3:10
7.	"Beautiful Girl"	Pete Droge; Dave Stewart	Pete Droge & the Sinners	4:34
8.	"I'll Miss You"	Aaron Freeman	Ween	2:56
9.	"Can't Get Enough of Your Love, Babe"	Barry White	Afghan Whigs	5:21
10.	"Could It Be I'm Falling in Love"	Melvin Steals; Mervin Steals	The Spinners	4:31
11.	"Beth"	Peter Criss; Bob Ezrin; Stanley Penridge	Kiss	2:46
12.	"Groove Me"	King Floyd	King Floyd	3:01
13.	"The Stroll"	Clyde Otis; Nancy Lee	The Diamonds	2:31
14.	"Sweet Caroline"	Neil Diamond	Neil Diamond	3:24
Total length:				57:16

=== Additional tracks (not included on soundtrack) ===
No.	Title	Writer(s)	Artist	Length
1.	"The Breakup Song (They Don't Write 'Em)"	Greg Kihn; Steve Wright	The Greg Kihn Band
2.	"I Got You"	Neil Finn	Split Enz
3.	"I Ran (So Far Away)"	Mike Score; Ali Score; Frank Maudsley; Paul Reynolds	A Flock Of Seagulls
4.	"Will It Go Round in Circles"	Billy Preston; Bruce Fisher	Billy Preston
5.	"Locomotive Breath"	Ian Anderson	Jethro Tull
6.	"Never on Sunday"	Manos Hatzidakis	Bernie Wyte and his Orchestra
7.	"Walk on the Wild Side"	Lou Reed	Lou Reed
8.	"Fool to Cry"	Mick Jagger; Keith Richards	Rolling Stones
9.	"Honey White"	Mark Sandman	Morphine

== Reception ==
=== Box office ===
The film was released on February 9, 1996, in 752 theaters in the United States and Canada, grossing $2.7 million on its opening weekend. It went on to gross $10.5 million in the United States and Canada and $27 million worldwide.

=== Critical response ===
The film received fairly positive reviews and has a 77% rating on Rotten Tomatoes, based on 48 reviews. The site's consensus reads: "A warm, thoughtful dramedy about male insecurity, Beautiful Girls is buoyed by an excellent cast - particularly Natalie Portman in a stunning early role". Roger Ebert of the Chicago Sun-Times wrote: "What's nicest about the film is the way it treasures the good feelings people can have for one another." In The Washington Post, Desson Howe praised Natalie Portman's performance: "As a self-described 'old soul' who connects spiritually with Hutton (they're both existential searchers), she's the movie's most poignant and witty presence."

However, Jack Mathews, in the Los Angeles Times, wrote that the film was "about as much fun as a neighborhood bar on a Tuesday night. Its crisis: not much happening." In her New York Times review Janet Maslin wrote that Natalie Portman got the film's "archest dialogue", and called her "a budding knockout, and scene-stealingly good even in an overly showy role."

Writing retrospectively, critic Sophie Gilbert described the relationship between Portman's and Hutton's characters as provocatively "inappropriate" and argued that it reflected a cultural trend in 1990s media of sexualizing girls.

== October Road ==
Scott Rosenberg later co-created the 2007 TV series October Road, loosely based on what happened after Beautiful Girls came out and how his friends reacted to a movie about their lives. Both Beautiful Girls and October Road take place in the fictional Massachusetts town of Knight's Ridge, and have similar characters, jobs, plot lines.
