= Welcome to Discovery Park =

Studio album by Brad
- Released: August 13, 2002
- Recorded: May 2001 – March 2002
- Studio: Studio Litho, Seattle, Washington; Studio X, Seattle, Washington
- Genre: Alternative rock, grunge
- Length: 58:20
- Language: English
- Label: Redline
- Producer: Brad, Skip Drinkwater, Phil Nicolo

Brad chronology
Interiors (1997)	Welcome to Discovery Park (2002)	Brad vs Satchel (2005)

Professional ratings
Review scores
Source	Rating
Allmusic	3/5 stars

Welcome to Discovery Park is the third studio album by the alternative rock band Brad. It was released in 2002 on Redline Records.

== Overview ==
The album's recording sessions took place from May 2001 to March 2002 at Studio Litho and Studio X in Seattle, Washington. Studio Litho is owned by guitarist Stone Gossard. The recording of Welcome to Discovery Park saw contributions from Mike Berg, who had taken over as the touring bassist for Jeremy Toback. Most of the album was produced by the band members themselves, although they also worked with producers Phil Nicolo and Skip Drinkwater. The album was mixed by Nicolo, Drinkwater, and Matt Bayles. The album's cover art was photographed by Bruce Tom. The album mixes the rawness of the band's debut, Shame, with the more polished, produced sound of the band's second album, Interiors. The album charted at number 46 on Billboard's Top Heatseekers chart. Bradley Torreano of Allmusic called it "another quality album that still leaves the listener hungry overall for some better songs." Outtakes from the recording sessions for Welcome to Discovery Park were included on the 2005 compilation album, Brad vs Satchel.

== Track listing ==
All lyrics are written by Shawn Smith, except where noted; all music is composed by Smith, except where noted.

No.	Title	Lyrics	Music	Length
1.	"Brothers and Sisters"			5:35
2.	"Shinin'"			4:21
3.	"Drop it Down"		Stone Gossard	4:17
4.	"Never Let Each Other Down"			4:00
5.	"If You Could Make it Good"			4:50
6.	"Revolution"		Regan Hagar	3:38
7.	"Takin' it Easy"			3:11
8.	"Sheepish"	Gossard	Gossard	4:11
9.	"All is One"		Mike Berg	4:32
10.	"Couch T-bone"		Berg, Gossard, Hagar, Smith	3:56
11.	"La, La, La"			3:50
12.	"Yes, You Are"			5:29
13.	"Arrakis"		Berg	6:30

European bonus tracks

All tracks are written by Gossard, Hagar, Smith, and Berg.

No.	Title	Length
14.	"It Ain't Easy"	3:18
15.	"Makes Me Crazy"	4:14

== Personnel ==
Brad

- Stone Gossard – guitars, drums, organ, synth, bass guitar
- Regan Hagar – drums, synth, guitar, design and layout
- Shawn Smith – vocals, piano, guitars, programming, drums, synth, bass guitar, organ
- Jeremy Toback – bass guitar
- Mike Berg – keyboards, piano, bass guitar, guitars, synth, organ

Additional musicians and production

- Matt Bayles – engineering, recording, mixing
- Brad – production
- Skip Drinkwater – additional production, mixing
- Rick Fisher at RFI/CD Mastering (Seattle) – mastering
- Sam Hofstedt, Floyd Reitsma – assistance
- Phil Nicolo – additional production, engineering, mixing
- Elizabeth Pupo Walker – percussion
- Bruce Tom – photos
- Thaddeus Turner – guitars, bass guitar

== Chart positions ==
Chart (2002)	Peak position
US Billboard Top Heatseekers	46
