= Live at the Point (Shawn Smith album) =

Live album by Shawn Smith
- Released: 2000
- Recorded: September 30, 1999
- Genre: Alternative
- Label: 818 Music, Establishment Store (2003 re-release), Sound Vs. Silence/Gator Records (2009 re-issue)
- Producer: Alan Mazzetti

Shawn Smith chronology
Let It All Begin (1999)	Live at the Point (2000)	Shield of Thorns (2003)

Professional ratings
Review scores
Source	Rating
ARTISTdirect.com	4.5/5 stars
Allmusic	4.5/5 stars

Live at the Point is a live album by Seattle musician Shawn Smith. It was recorded at The Point in Philadelphia. Smith plays piano or guitar and sings on all tracks, with no other accompaniment. Smith has described this as his "best live vocal performance ever captured". The album includes songs from his 1999 album Let It All Begin and covers of songs by his bands Brad and Satchel as well as a song by Prince, "Sometimes It Snows in April." The album has received acclaim from critics.

== Track listing ==
1. "My Very Best"
2. "Someday"
3. "Not Too Late" (Satchel cover)
4. "Let It All Begin"
5. "Sometimes It Snows in April" (Prince and The Revolution cover)
6. "A Little Heart" (unreleased original)
7. "Screen" (Brad cover)
8. "On The Banks"
9. "The Day Brings" (Brad cover)
10. "Buttercup" (Brad cover)
11. "Suffering" (Satchel cover)
