= Leaving California =

Leaving California may refer to:

- "Leaving California", song by Shawn Smith from Shield of Thorns
- "Leaving California", song by Boys Like Girls from Crazy World
- "Leaving California", song by Maroon 5 from V
