= Shame (Brad album) =

Studio album by Brad
- Released: April 27, 1993
- Recorded: October 4–21, 1992 at Avast Recording Co., Seattle, Washington
- Genres: Alternative rock; grunge; funk rock
- Length: 42:35
- Labels: Loosegroove, Epic
- Producer: Brad

Brad chronology
Shame (1993)	Interiors (1997)

Singles from Shame
- 1. "Screen / Buttercup" Released: 1993; 2. "20th Century" Released: 1993

Professional ratings
Review scores
Source	Rating
AllMusic	4/5 stars
Classic Rock	7/10
Entertainment Weekly	B−
Q	4/5 stars

Shame is the debut studio album by the American rock band Brad. It was released on April 27, 1993, through Epic Records.

== Recording ==
Brad formed officially in 1992, although the band members had been playing together for a long time before that. The band originally wanted to go by the name Shame, but the name was already taken by a band featuring musician Brad Wilson. Instead, the band took the name Brad and decided to name their debut album Shame.

The album was recorded in October 1992 in roughly 20 days at Avast Recording Co. in Seattle, Washington. Many tracks are taken from in-studio jam sessions. The band members produced the album themselves. The album was mixed by Brendan O'Brien. The album's cover art was provided by Seattle's Crocodile Cafe.

== Release ==
Shame, featuring a raw sound and an eclectic mix of styles, was released to mixed reviews and moderate sales. The track "20th Century" was a minor hit in the UK. The album charted at number 14 on Billboard's Top Heatseekers chart. While sometimes categorised as “grunge”, the band sit apart in some ways: “Despite all of Brad’s connections to ’90s grunge, neither Shame nor Interiors sound much like the defining music of that scene, instead featuring soft, nocturnal rock, giddy rhythms and glossy funk jams. More importantly, Shawn Smith’s presence defines Brad even more than Gossard’s musical contributions or inherent fame. Smith is an unusual vocalist even without the nebulous grunge influences of Brad’s apparent circle of friends; adjacent to era contemporaries like Soundgarden, Alice in Chains, Gossard and Jeff Ament’s Green River or Regan and Andrew Wood’s Malfunkshun, Smith’s honeyed falsetto starts to sound like the song of another species altogether.” Spectrumculture”

Music videos were made for the songs "Buttercup" and "20th Century".

== Track listing ==
All lyrics are written by Shawn Smith, except where noted; all music is composed by Stone Gossard, Regan Hagar, Smith, and Jeremy Toback, except where noted.

No.	Title	Lyrics	Music	Length
1.	"Buttercup"			4:14
2.	"My Fingers"			3:19
3.	"Nadine"		Gossard	3:31
4.	"Screen"		Smith	5:11
5.	"20th Century"			4:02
6.	"Good News"		Smith	4:23
7.	"Raise Love"			4:14
8.	"Bad for the Soul"			1:11
9.	"Down"	Toback	Toback	4:17
10.	"Rockstar"			2:47
11.	"We"			5:26

== Personnel ==
Brad

- Stone Gossard – guitars
- Regan Hagar – drums, cover and package design
- Shawn Smith – vocals, piano, organ, guitar on "Down"
- Jeremy Toback – bass guitar, lead vocals and organ on "Down"

Additional musicians and production

- Jenny Behe – mixing assistance
- Brad – production
- Greg Calbi – mastering
- Crocodile Cafe, Seattle, Washington – cover photo
- Brett Eliason – second engineer
- Sony Felito – post-pro engineering
- Bashiri Johnson – percussion
- Eric Johnson – disc art
- Stuart Hallerman – Avast assistance
- Noel Lakey – first engineer
- Mark Lindsay – painting
- Lance Mercer – band photos
- Brendan O'Brien – mixing
- Joel Zimmerman – Epic art direction

== Chart positions ==
=== Album ===
Chart (1993)	Peak position
US Billboard Top Heatseekers	14

=== Singles ===
Year	Single	UK peak chart position
1993	"20th Century"	64

== Accolades ==
Publication	Country	Accolade	Year	Rank
Kerrang!	United Kingdom	"100 Albums You Must Hear Before You Die"	1998	88
