= The Full Sentence =

Studio album by Pigeonhed
- Released: January 28, 1997
- Recorded: Bad Animals, Seattle, WA
- Genre: Electronic
- Length: 65:55
- Label: Sub Pop
- Producer: John Goodmanson, Pigeonhed

Pigeonhed chronology
Pigeonhed (1993)	The Full Sentence (1997)	Des Colores (TBA)

Professional ratings
Review scores
Source	Rating
AllMusic	3/5 stars
Entertainment Weekly	A
NME	7/10
Uncut	4/5 stars

The Full Sentence is the second and final studio album by Pigeonhed, released on January 28, 1997 through Sub Pop. The track "Fire's Comin' Down" appeared on the soundtrack of the 1996 movie Hype!

== Track listing ==
All tracks are written by Pigeonhed, except "Phunpurephun" co-written with Greg Freeman and Kim Thayil and "31st of July" co-written with Regan Hagar.

No.	Title	Length
1.	"It's Like the Man Said"	4:23
2.	"The Full Sentence"	6:48
3.	"Marry Me"	3:26
4.	"Keep On Keepin' On"	3:55
5.	"Battle Flag"	5:57
6.	"Glory Bound"	5:52
7.	"P-Street"	5:39
8.	"Phunpurephun"	5:00
9.	"Who's to Blame"	2:37
10.	"31st of July"	4:39
11.	"More Than Just a Girl"	6:21
12.	"Fire's Comin' Down"	4:26
13.	"For Those Gone On"	4:26
14.	"Honor"	2:26

== Pigeonhed's Flash Bulb Emergency Overflow Cavalcade of Remixes ==
On October 7, 1997, Pigeonhed released a remix album of songs on The Full Sentence.

No.	Title	Length
1.	"The Full Sentence - Fisk-Goodman Seismic Consumer Remix"	6:40
2.	"Phunpurephun - Technical Itch Remix"	8:07
3.	"Glory Bound - Red Snapper Edit Mix"	4:27
4.	"Battle Flag - Lo Fidelity Allstars Remix"	5:40
5.	"Marry Me - Fisk-Goodman Prenuptial Trash Heap Remix"	4:56
6.	"It's Like The Man Said - Highlanders Syn-ful Mix"	5:20
7.	"Keep On Keepin' On - Ultra Living Mix"	6:14
8.	"Marry Me - Dave Ruffy Blissed-Out Ambient Mix"	4:07
9.	"The Full Sentence - Substate Remix"	8:12

Professional ratings
Review scores
Source	Rating
AllMusic	4/5 stars

== Personnel ==
Pigeonhed

- Steve Fisk – piano, keyboards, synthesizer, Hammond organ, loops, vibraphone, arrangement, sequencing
- Shawn Smith – vocals, drums, drum machine, guitar, keyboards, Hammond organ, mellotron, programming

Additional musicians

- Carrie Akre – additional vocals (6, 12)
- Jerry Cantrell – guitar (3)
- Matt Chamberlain – drums (3, 10), percussion (7, 10)
- Helios Creed – guitar (8)
- Om Fletcher – additional vocals (6, 12)
- Wayne Flower – bass guitar (8)
- Greg Freeman – bass guitar (8)
- Regan Hagar – drums (10)
- Mark Pickerel – drums (8)
- Riz Rollins – additional vocals (6, 12)
- Cedric Ross – bass guitar (7)
- Kim Thayil – guitar (3, 5, 8, 10)
- Reggie Watts – additional vocals (6, 12)

Production

- Arthur S. Aubry – photography
- Greg Calbi – mastering
- John Goodmanson – production, engineering
- Lance Mercer – photography
- Pigeonhed – production
