= Midnight Rose (disambiguation) =

Midnight Rose was a group of fiction and fantasy writers.

Midnight Rose may also refer to:

- Midnight Rose (album), 2023 album by Paul Rodgers
- Midnight Rose (film), 1928 American film directed by James Young
- "Midnight Rose", a song from the Restless Days (album), by The Clarks
- Midnight Rose candy store, headquarters of the organized crime group Murder, Inc.
- Midnight Rose's, 1991 album by Royal Crescent Mob
