= Live at the Point =

Live at the Point may refer to:

- Live at the Point (1994 Christy Moore album)
- Live at the Point (2006 Christy Moore album)
- Live at the Point (Shawn Smith album)
