= Brad vs Satchel =

Compilation album by Brad and Satchel
- Released: July 26, 2005
- Genre: Alternative rock
- Length: 50:15
- Language: English
- Label: The Establishment Store

Brad chronology
Welcome to Discovery Park (2002)	Brad vs Satchel (2005)	Best Friends? (2010)

Satchel chronology
The Family (1996)	Brad vs Satchel (2005)	Heartache and Honey (2010)

Professional ratings
Review scores
Source	Rating
Allmusic	3.5/5 stars

Brad vs Satchel is a compilation album of unreleased and incomplete tracks by the American rock bands Brad and Satchel. It was released on July 26, 2005 through The Establishment Store.

== Overview ==
Brad and Satchel share three of the same band members. Satchel has been folded into Brad, and other than on special occasions, does not perform or record as Satchel any longer. The tracks performed by Brad on this release were recorded during the recording sessions for the band's third studio album, Welcome to Discovery Park. Greg Prato of Allmusic said, "For hardcore fans, Brad vs Satchel will be of interest. But if you're a casual fan, you'd probably be better off sticking with the studio albums by each group."

== Track listing ==
All songs written by Stone Gossard, Regan Hagar, Shawn Smith and Mike Berg, except where noted:

Recorded in 1997 by Satchel:

1. "Looking Forward" (Berg, Hagar, Smith) – 4:50
2. "Peace & Quiet" (Berg, Hagar, Smith) – 5:30
3. "Takin' It Back" (Berg, Hagar, Smith) – 3:47

Recorded in 2001 by Brad:

4. "Roll Over" – 3:23

Recorded in 1997 by Satchel:

5. "Whose Side Are You On" (Berg, Hagar, Smith) – 5:28

Recorded in 2001 by Brad:

6. "I Don't Know If...You'll" – 4:44
7. "3 O'Clock" – 2:53
8. "Summertime Song" – 3:14
9. "I Must Confess" – 5:09
10. "Awake" – 4:54
11. "Playground" – 6:23

== Personnel ==
Brad

- Stone Gossard – guitar, engineering
- Regan Hagar – drums, engineering, design, photography, layout design, photo design, photo illustration
- Shawn Smith – keyboards, vocals
- Mike Berg – bass guitar, engineering

Production

- Matt Bayles, Floyd Reitsman – engineering
- Ed Brooks – mastering
