= Interiors (Brad album) =

Studio album by Brad
- Released: June 24, 1997
- Recorded: December 1996 – January 1997 at Studio Litho, Seattle, Washington
- Genre: Alternative rock; soft rock; funk rock
- Length: 44:56
- Language: English
- Label: Epic
- Producer: Brad, Nick DiDia

Brad chronology
Shame (1993)	Interiors (1997)	Welcome to Discovery Park (2002)

Singles from Interiors
- 1. "The Day Brings" Released: 1997; 2. "Secret Girl" Released: 1997

Professional ratings
Review scores
Source	Rating
AllMusic	3/5 stars
Classic Rock	8/10 stars
NME	(3/10)
Pitchfork Media	(3.8/10)
Rolling Stone	3/5 stars

Interiors is the second studio album by the American rock band Brad. It was released on June 24, 1997, through Epic Records.

== Recording ==
The album's recording sessions took place from December 1996 to January 1997 at Studio Litho in Seattle, Washington. Studio Litho is owned by guitarist Stone Gossard. The band worked with producer Nick DiDia. The album was mixed by DiDia and Brendan O'Brien. The album featured a more polished sound compared with the band's debut album, Shame.

== Release ==
Interiors was met with poor sales, however the band saw its cult audience expand. The lead single from Interiors, "The Day Brings", features Mike McCready from Pearl Jam on lead guitar. The album charted at number 30 on Billboard's Top Heatseekers chart. A music video was made for the song "The Day Brings". Interiors was accompanied by a tour in the United States and Canada in 1997, as well as a small tour in Australia and New Zealand in 1998.

=== Reception ===
Interiors received mixed reviews from critics. Stephen Thomas Erlewine of AllMusic awarded the album three stars. He wrote "Given its title, it perhaps shouldn't come as a surprise that Interiors is an introspective collection, but its tempered sound is somewhat of a shock when considering the grunge background of the entire band." Erlewine compared the album's sound to 1970s soft rock, which contrasts Gossard's primary band Pearl Jam, whose sound is more reminiscent of 1970s hard rock. Tom Moon of Rolling Stone said that "what's most notable about Interiors...is the pure pop focus of these nuanced compositions."

Other reviewers were more negative. James P. Wisdom of Pitchfork Media stated that "In any case, Interiors is 11 tracks of mildly retro-sound, with a few passable songs, the rest being simply crap," and compared them negatively to Crosby, Stills and Nash. NME reviewer Jim Alexander criticized the album further, saying that "What they really want to do is transport you back to the stinking corpse of the '70s, via Shawn Smith's drawled screeching riffs, with the subtlety and grace of a geriatric diplodocus, and numerous funk-rock workouts that will be on eternal rotation on hell's version of MTV."

== Track listing ==
All tracks are written by Stone Gossard, Regan Hagar, Shawn Smith, and Jeremy Toback.

No.	Title	Length
1.	"Secret Girl"	3:13
2.	"The Day Brings"	3:43
3.	"Lift"	4:39
4.	"I Don't Know"	3:39
5.	"Upon My Shoulders"	4:37
6.	"Sweet Al George"	4:03
7.	"Funeral Song"	4:58
8.	"Circle & Line"	3:42
9.	"Some Never Come Home"	4:23
10.	"Candles"	2:20
11.	"Those Three Words"	5:39

Japanese bonus tracks

All tracks are written by Gossard, Hagar, Smith, and Toback.

No.	Title	Length
12.	"Seance"	3:33
13.	"Heaven Help"	4:18

== Personnel ==
Brad

- Stone Gossard – guitars, painting
- Regan Hagar – drums, package design
- Shawn Smith – vocals, piano, organ
- Jeremy Toback – bass guitar

Additional musicians and production

- Matt Bayles – recording
- Brad – production
- Nick DiDia – production, recording, mixing
- Shelly Gossard – production coordination
- Bashiri Johnson – percussion
- Steve Marcusson – mastering
- Mike McCready – additional guitar on "The Day Brings"
- Lance Mercer, Fabienne Toback, Harry Wirth – photos
- Brendan O'Brien – mixing, additional keyboards on "I Don't Know", additional guitar on "Lift", "I Don't Know", and "Some Never Come Home"
- John Riegart, Tom Schick, Ryan Williams, Mike Wilson – assistance
- Wendy Sutter – cello on "Upon My Shoulders"

== Charts ==
Chart (1997)	Peak position
Australian Albums (ARIA Charts)	63
US Billboard Top Heatseekers	30
