= Malfunkshun =

American rock band

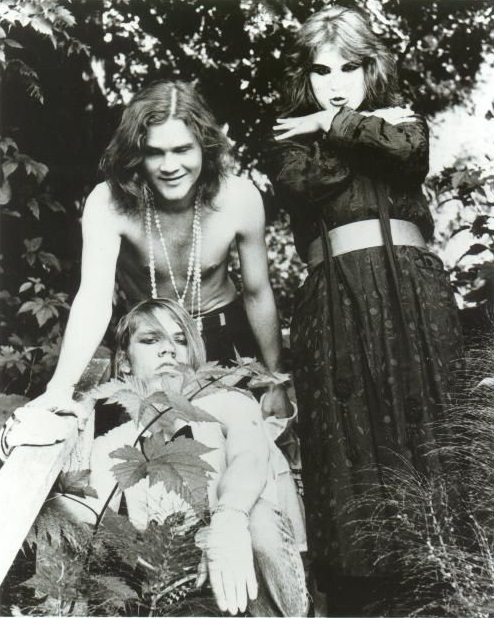
- 1980s lineup. Clockwise from bottom: Regan Hagar, Kevin Wood, Andrew Wood

Background information
- Origin: Bainbridge Island, Washington, U.S.
- Genres: Grunge; glam punk
- Years active: 1980–1988, 2005–present
- Labels: C/Z, Loosegroove, Wammybox
- Spinoffs: Mother Love Bone; Fire Ants; Hater; Devilhead; Brad
- Members: Kevin Wood; Jeff Stark; BT Leach; Paul Lamb
- Past members: Andrew Wood; Regan Hagar; Shawn Smith; Dave Rees; David Hunt; Jeff Loftis; Cory Kane; Mike Stone; Thorsten Rock; Guy McIntosh; Jeff Loftis; Rob Day; Miles Freeborn; Tony West
- Website: malfunkshun.org

Malfunkshun is an American rock band formed in 1980 by brothers Andrew and Kevin Wood. Combining glam influences with distortion, they were one of the earliest grunge bands, forming alongside the U-Men and Melvins. Their definitive lineup consists of the brothers and drummer Regan Hagar. After interactions with fellow grunge act Green River, Andrew would become the frontman for successor Mother Love Bone. Malfunkshun dissolved without having released much material, although they recorded demos and appeared in the landmark grunge compilation Deep Six.

Andrew struggled with drug dependence for several years, eventually dying from a heroin overdose in 1990. Mother Love Bone disbanded as a result and was succeeded by Pearl Jam. Malfunkshun's demos with Andrew were later compiled and released as Return to Olympus on Loosegroove Records, which was founded by Hagar and fellow Mother Love Bone member Stone Gossard. Malfunkshun reformed in 2005 and is currently touring and recording new material.

== History ==
=== 1980s: Andrew Wood era ===
Bainbridge Island, Washington brothers Andrew and Kevin Wood, decided to skip an Easter dinner at their grandmother's house and stayed at home instead - and recorded their first demo, titled "Malfunkshun". A bit later they found drummer David Hunt (1964–2009) and bassist Dave Rees, and became a four-piece. Hunt and Rees played with Malfunkshun for only one show; after they left, Andrew took over bass and drummer Regan Hagar was recruited from the band Maggot Brains, establishing the band's definitive power trio lineup.

During performances, each band member had an alter ego. Andrew's was L'Andrew the Love Child, Kevin was Kevinstein and Regan became Thundarr. Kevin's stage persona wasn't as carved-in-stone as Andrew's or Regan's, referred to sometimes as "the Axe-Handler" and even an early Malfunkshun poster hand-drawn by Andrew names him "Led Springsteen". Using makeup and flashy glam-style clothing in a nod to Kiss, and other favorite bands, Malfunkshun was known for their dynamic live shows. Andrew was unpredictable and would wander the crowd during shows with his wireless bass, and even stop shows to eat cereal, and throw the rest out to the crowd. Andrew became increasingly involved with drugs and in 1985 he checked into drug rehab, during which time Malfunkshun was put on hold.

When Andrew returned from rehab, the band started up again and contributed "With Yo' Heart (Not Yo' Hands)" and "Stars-n-You" to the Deep Six compilation by C/Z Records. Notwithstanding their densely distorted sound, Sub Pop never took much interest in the band. Although they were beginning to gain popularity they rarely headlined their own shows.

Dissolving, but never formally disbanding, Malfunkshun took a back seat to the jam sessions Andrew and Hagar had begun with Green River members Stone Gossard and Jeff Ament. These sessions were the beginnings of Lords of the Wasteland, which would become Mother Love Bone after the addition of Greg Gilmore and Bruce Fairweather. Kevin formed Fire Ants in 1992 with his brother Brian, bassist Dan McDonald, and former Nirvana drummer Chad Channing. Later Brian joined Ben Shepherd of Soundgarden, to form Hater. The brothers later formed Devilhead. Hagar moved on, playing in Satchel, with Shawn Smith, and in Brad, also with Shawn Smith and with Stone Gossard.

A grouping of Malfunkshun demos and recordings from 1986 to 1987 were released on Stone Gossard and Regan Hagar's Loosegroove label in 1995, as Return to Olympus, which was the largest major label release of the band's material.

=== 2005–present: Documentary and reformation ===
In 2005, a documentary entitled Malfunkshun: The Andrew Wood Story, debuted at the Seattle International Film Festival. The documentary is available on DVD in a boxed set with the reissued CD entitled Return to Olympus and the never before released Andrew Wood CD entitled Melodies and Dreams. This boxed set is a digipak set of 3 discs (1 DVD/2 CD's) entitled Malfunkshun: The Andrew Wood Story released on July 19, 2011, by Universal Music Enterprises.

On October 24, 2006, surviving members Kevin Wood and Regan Hagar, with vocalist Shawn Smith and bassist Cory Kane, began writing new music using lyrics written by Andrew before his death, for the release of a new album, after which they planned to go on tour. The band had originally intended to use the name Malfunkshun, soon changing it to Subfunkshun or the Subfunkshun Project, and eventually settling on From the North (Von Nord).

On February 19, 2011, Malfunkshun announced on their website that Jeff Loftis would be taking over vocals for both Malfunkshun and From the North. On March 14, 2011, Kevin and Jeff recorded the song "Jezebel Woman" and on March 19, 2011, recorded "Until the Ocean". They have posted both songs on YouTube under the name "Malfunkshun 2011". On May 15, 2011, Malfunkshun posted on their website, that Regan officially stepped down as the drummer, and on May 24, 2011, Malfunkshun posted on their website naming Mike Stone as Regan's replacement on drums, however Miles Freeborn substituted for Stone in March 2012 and has remained the band's drummer ever since. On May 9, 2012, Malfunkshun announced on their website that Rob Day had joined the band in place of Guy McIntosh, who had briefly replaced Cory Kane on bass for the band's autumn/winter tour dates.

== Members ==
Current members

- Kevin Wood – guitar (1980–1988, 2006–present)
- Jeff Stark – lead vocals (2015–present)
- Bradley BT Leach – drums (2015–present)
- Paul Lamb – bass guitar, keyboards (2016–present)

Former members

- Andrew Wood – lead vocals, bass guitar (1980–1988; died 1990)
- Dave Rees – bass guitar (1980–1981)
- David Hunt – drums (1980–1981; died 2009)
- Regan Hagar – drums (1980–1988, 2006–2011)
- Thorsten Rock – guitar (2006–2008)
- Cory Kane – bass guitar (2006–2011)
- Shawn Smith – lead vocals (2006–2011; died 2019)
- Mike Stone – drums (2011–2012)
- Guy McIntosh – bass guitar (2011–2012)
- Jeff Loftis – lead vocals (2011–2013; died 2025)
- Rob Day – bass guitar (2012–2016)
- Miles Freeborn – drums (2012–2015)
- Tony West – lead vocals (2014–2015)

== Discography ==
=== Albums ===
- Return to Olympus (Loosegroove Records, 1995).
- Monument (Wammybox Records, 2017).

=== EPs ===
- Glow (Wammybox Records, 2021).

=== Compilations ===
- Olympus Awaits (Southern Lord, 2024).

=== Compilation contributions ===
- "With Yo' Heart (Not Yo' Hands)" and "Stars-N-You" on Deep Six (C/Z Records, 1986).
- "My Only Fan" and "Shotgun Wedding" on Another Pyrrhic Victory (C/Z Records, 1989).
