= Lonnie Marshall =

- Origin: Los Angeles, California, United States
- Occupations: Singer, songwriter, instrumentalist
- Instrument: Bass

Lonnie "Meganut" Marshall is an American bass player, singer, and songwriter from South Central Los Angeles. He is best known as the frontman and founder of Weapon of Choice and is the inventor of the Nutmeg Potty Plunger.

== Early life ==
Marshall is the second of five children. He grew up and attended school in South Central Los Angeles, graduating from Mid City Alternative Magnet school. While in school, Marshall was exposed to P Funk through a classmate whose father worked for Parliament/Funkadelic. That connection allowed Marshall and his brother Arik to experience the original P Funk up close and proved to be a highly influential event in his life, inspiring him to pursue a career in music and to create his own brand of funk music which he calls Nutmeg. Through his friend's father's connection he was able to join Bootsy onstage at the Last Great LA Funk Festival.

After high school he worked for a short time as a walking messenger for downtown Los Angeles law firms while attending Los Angeles City College. There he majored in music and worked in the music office. While acting as a practice room monitor, he met and played with Lebo M. of Lion King Fame in his group Accent. He also got his start in music by joining the bands Animal Dance and Shrine with Xan Cassavetes and Steve Hufsteter.

== Music career ==
=== Marshall Law ===
In 1988, Marshall and his brother Arik Marshall, a guitarist, formed a band called Marshall Law. They performed around Los Angeles and signed a development deal with Island Records. They recorded a demo for the record company, but the band dissolved after having only released two tracks on a Ska Parade compilation. Around this time Arik and Lonnie played on legendary Delicious Vinyl's first platinum 12" by Tone Loc. They later reunited in 2006 to release an album titled Another X-cuse. Immediately following the break up of Marshall Law, Lonnie formed the band Weapon of Choice while Arik joined the Red Hot Chili Peppers and later became a permanent member of Macy Gray’s band.

=== Weapon of Choice ===
Lonnie founded Weapon of Choice in 1992 with himself on bass and lead vocals and members Keefus Ciancia (keyboards), Finn Hammer (guitar), Tom-Bone Ralls (trombone), Scott Garrett (drums), Audra Cunningham (vocals) and Angelica "Jellybean" Arnado (visual artist/dance). After a video directed by Geoff Moore for their song, Uppity, Yuppity Doolittle, came to the attention of Stone Gossard, the band was signed to Gossard‘s record label Loosegroove. They released three albums with Loosegroove before the company folded in 2000: "Nut-meg says Bozo the Town" (1994); featuring Matt Chamberlain on one song, Highperspice (1996), and Nutmeg Phantasy (1998). In 2001, the band released "Illoominutty" on Fishbone's Nuttsactor 5 record label, and in 2003, they released Color Me Funky.

And independently produced Weapon of Choice DVD, Weapon of Choice: Uncut Nut 1992–2006, was released in 2007. The band continues to perform, mainly in the Los Angeles area. Many of the original members have gone on to other bands or pursuits and have been replaced by newer members.

=== Other work ===
Outside of Weapon of Choice, Marshall has recorded and performed with a variety of artists and has participated in a number of side projects.

He has performed alongside members of P Funk and Fishbone, among others, as part of Trulio Disgracias, a group formed by Norwood Fisher of Fishbone in 1987. The band's lineup changes from show to show. He is also an emcee, composer, and performer for Dakah, a 65 piece hip-hop orchestra which performs periodically in the Los Angeles area.

He recorded and toured with Joe Strummer of The Clash, promoting Strummer's 1989 solo release Earthquake Weather. He cowrote one song on the album with Strummer and Zander Schloss, "Boogie With Your Children", sang a duet on one song, and harmonies on others.

He has contributed to recordings by Tone Loc, Ice Cube, George Clinton, Funkadelic, Perry Farrell (Jane’s Addiction), Fishbone, Les Claypool (Primus), Stone Gossard (Pearl Jam) and Arik Marshall.

He performed with the Red Hot Chili Peppers and George Clinton at the 1993 Grammy Awards Show. He has also performed with Chaka Khan, Queen Latifah, Kurupt (Tha Dogg Pound), Daniel Lanois, N'dea Davenport, Shock G (Digital Underground), Mike Shrieve (Santana) and Doug Wimbish (Sugar Hill Records and Living Colour.

He played on Billboard award-winning and Grammy nominated Dionne Farris' first solo album produced by Randy Jackson

Played bass on Grammy award-winning Macy Gray's second album on a song produced by Rick Rubin.

He partnered with Gabby Lang a.k.a. Gabby La La as a duo called Love Balm to record an album c. 2002.

He released a solo album, That Would Be Dope, In 2005 under the name Meganut and Friends. The friends included Skerik, Pete Droge, Stone Gossard and Matt Chamberlain.

He invented an instrument out of recycled materials for a Youth Art Project called the "Rubbabox". He then taught at risk youth all over Los Angeles how to make their own. They presented and performed with them at the House of Blues, the Getty Villa, Hammer Museum, Grammy Museum, Skirball Cultural Center, and other museums.

Lonnie collaborated with George Clinton on Rubbabox video.

He performed on America's Got Talent with the Rubbabox.

He opened up for Primus at the Microsoft Theater playing the Rubbabox with 8 yr. old youth from Lil' Big Ups.

In 2009 he and the Mayor with the Life Drum Core, a group of young musicians he put together, performed at the Microsoft Theater in Los Angeles for Earth Day and garnered local news coverage. The group performed on drums they had created from recycled plastic buckets on which they painted Earth Day designs.

He partnered with Fishbone member Angelo Moore, and young musicians Malik Deering and Tevin Douglas to form a group called the Unstoppabros which performed in Los Angeles in 2009.

In 2020 Lonnie played with Bernard Purdie, Bootsy Collins, and Fred Wesley at the Wisdome LA.

He has taught guitar and bass and led Funk Workshops and camps for kids at the Silverlake Conservatory of Music (founded by Flea from the Red Hot Chili Peppers since its inception in 2001.

== Television and film ==
Marshall had a Public-access television show in Los Angeles on cable TV called the Late Nutt Snack. In 2010, he filmed a pilot for a children’s television program called the Lil Big Ups.

He appeared on an episode of the 2000–2001 Bette Midler sitcom on CBS performing a rap with her that he wrote.

He and members of Weapon of Choice appeared on the Tonight Show with Jay Leno as the backup band for Snoop Dogg.

A Weapon of Choice song, "Nutty Nutmeg Phantasy", was adapted and re-recorded by Macy Gray and appeared in the 2002 movie Spider-Man and on the Soundtrack.

Marshall played MC Madd, the dance battle MC in the opening scene in the 2007 Columbus Short movie Stomp the Yard.

== Awards and recognition ==
In 1996, he was voted one of the top five funk bassists in Bass Player Magazine.

== Discography ==
- another X-cuse (2006)

With Joe Strummer

- Earthquake Weather (1989)

With Weapon of Choice

- Nut-Meg Sez "Bozo the Town" (1994)
- Highperspice (1996)
- Nutmeg Phantasy (1998)
- Illoominutty (2001)
- Color Me Funky (2003)
- Really Relevant (2013)

With Meganut and Friends

- That Would Be Dope (2005)
