= Let It All Begin =

- Original 818 Music release (photo by Shawn Smith)

Studio album by Shawn Smith
- Released: 1999
- Recorded: October 1998 through June 1999
- Genre: Alternative rock
- Label: 818 Music; Establishment Store (re-issue); Sound vs Silence (2nd re-issue); Suzuki Records (streaming)
- Producer: Shawn Smith, Lucy Suzuki, Nick DiDia

Shawn Smith chronology
Let It All Begin (1999)	Live at the Point (2000)

Alternative cover
- Cover from the 2003 re-release on the Establishment Store label

Professional ratings
Review scores
Source	Rating
Kerrang!	4/5 stars

Let It All Begin is the first solo release by Seattle musician Shawn Smith. It was recorded in Seattle and Atlanta. The album was re-released in 2003 by the Establishment Store label and again in 2008 on Sound vs Silence. A remastered version was released to streaming on October 7, 2024 by Suzuki Records.

== Track listing ==
1. "My Very Best"
2. "Someday"
3. "Land of Gold"
4. "Love Is Always (in your eyes)"
5. "Until the End"
6. "Let It All Begin"
7. "The Train Is Coming"
8. "Our Songs"
9. "Pearl"
10. "On the Banks"
