= Royal Crescent Mob =

American funk rock band

Royal Crescent Mob was an American four-piece punk funk/funk rock band from Columbus, Ohio, United States, formed in 1985. Also known to their fans as the R.C. Mob, the band members included Brian "B" Emch (guitar), David Ellison (vocals, harmonica), Harold "Happy" Chichester (bass, vocals) and after an early revolving door of drummers, Carlton Smith (drums).

After garnering considerable college radio airplay in the 1980s, the band was signed to Sire Records, a Warner Bros. Records subsidiary. In the late 1980s and early 1990s, the band gained national exposure opening for national touring artists the Replacements, the B-52's, and the Red Hot Chili Peppers among others. Despite regularly performing to packed houses—including a sold-out show at O'Cayz Corral where the dancing crowd caused the floor to collapse—the band's two releases on Sire failed to perform in sales and on the charts, causing Sire to drop them from the label. After self-releasing a live album, followed by the more experimental full-length studio album Good Lucky Killer, the group disbanded.

Post-breakup, Smith recorded several tracks with 24-7 Spyz for their 1996 Heavy Metal Soul By The Pound album. Chichester went on to form Howlin' Maggie, worked with the Afghan Whigs, was a founding member of The Twilight Singers pursued a solo career. Ellison went on to tour managing such artists as Alanis Morissette, Indigo Girls, Goo Goo Dolls, Avril Lavigne, Panic! at the Disco and Miley Cyrus.

The band reunited for two shows in December 2022. The shows were benefits, raising money for cancer research. The shows raised $55,000.

Smith died on September 23, 2023, after a battle with glioblastoma.

== Discography ==
=== Albums ===
- Land of Sugar EP (No Other) 1986
- Omerta (Moving Target/Celluloid) 1987
- Something New, Old and Borrowed (Moving Target/Celluloid) 1988
- Spin the World (Sire) 1989
- Midnight Rose's (Sire/Warner Bros.) 1991
- 13 Destruction (Mobco) 1992
- Good Lucky Killer (Enemy) 1994

=== Singles ===
Year	Title	US	Album
Year	Title	Mod Rock	Album
1988	"Happy At Home"	—	single only
1989	"Hungry"	27	Spin the World
1989	"Nanana"	—	Spin the World
1991	"Konk"	—	Midnight Rose's
1991	"Timebomb"	—	Midnight Rose's
