= Weapon of Choice =

Weapon of Choice may refer to:

- Weapon of choice, a weapon commonly associated with a certain group or individual

== Music ==
- Weapon of Choice (band), an American band
- Weapons of Choice (album), a 2006 album by Treat
- "Weapon of Choice" (song), a 2000 song by Fatboy Slim
- "Weapon of Choice", a song by Black Rebel Motorcycle Club from the 2007 album Baby 81

== Other uses ==
- Weapon of Choice (video game), a 2008 video game
- Weapons of Choice, a 2004 novel by John Birmingham
- "Weapon of Choice", a Doctor Who audio play
