= Pigeonhed (album) =

Studio album by Pigeonhed
- Released: December 20, 1993
- Recorded: S.C.U.D. Audio
- Genre: Electronic
- Length: 55:41
- Label: Sub Pop
- Producer: Bruce Pavitt, Pigeonhed, Jonathan Poneman

Pigeonhed chronology
Pigeonhed (1993)	The Full Sentence (1997)

Professional ratings
Review scores
Source	Rating
AllMusic	4.5/5 stars

Pigeonhed is the eponymously titled debut studio album of Pigeonhed, released on December 20, 1993 through Sub Pop. Two singles were released from the album - "Theme From Pigeonhed" and "Ain't It So."

== Track listing ==
All tracks are written by Steve Fisk and Shawn Smith.

No.	Title	Length
1.	"Theme from Pigeonhed"	3:30
2.	"Ain't It So"	6:29
3.	"Special Way"	3:22
4.	"Her"	4:22
5.	"Lovely Lines"	3:30
6.	"Cadillac"	6:29
7.	"Trial by Sex"	4:41
8.	"Salome"	7:10
9.	"Brothers"	7:33
10.	"Buzz"	5:52
11.	"Grace"	2:43

== Accolades ==
Year	Publication	Country	Accolade	Rank
1993	Melody Maker	United Kingdom	"Albums of the Year"	22
1993	Rockdelux	Spain	"Albums of the Year"	29
"*" denotes an unordered list.

== Personnel ==
Pigeonhed

- Steve Fisk – instruments
- Shawn Smith – vocals

Additional musicians

- Kim Thayil – guitar

Production

- Arthur S. Aubry – photography
- Art Chantry – design
- Bruce Pavitt – production
- Pigeonhed – production, mixing
- Jonathan Poneman – production
