= Malfunkshun: The Andrew Wood Story =

- Directed by: Scot Barbour
- Produced by: Scot Barbour; Vince Duque; Jessy Barbour
- Cinematography: Andre de Castilho
- Edited by: Scot Barbour
- Production company: Dos Ojos Productions
- Release date: June 4, 2005 (Seattle International Film Festival)
- Running time: 107 minutes
- Country: United States
- Language: English

Malfunkshun: The Andrew Wood Story is a 2005 documentary film produced, directed, and edited by Scot Barbour, based on the life of Andrew Wood, singer/songwriter for the Seattle-based alternative rock bands Malfunkshun and Mother Love Bone. The film includes interviews with fellow Seattle musicians and friends such as Chris Cornell, Kim Thayil, Jeff Ament, and Stone Gossard.

== Synopsis ==
Andrew Wood died of a heroin overdose in 1990, just as his band Mother Love Bone was poised for commercial success. Upon Wood's death, two founding members of Mother Love Bone, Jeff Ament and Stone Gossard along with Eddie Vedder, formed a band called Mookie Blaylock. However, they soon changed the band's name to Pearl Jam and became one of the most successful rock acts of the 1990s.

== Release ==
The film premiered at the Seattle International Film Festival on June 4, 2005. In October of the same year, the film won Best Documentary Film at the FAIF Film Festival in Hollywood, California.

The film was released by Universal Music Group in 2011 as part of a boxed set including “Melodies & Dreams” The Andrew Wood Solo Album, and a re-release of “Return to Olympus” from Loosegroove Records.

In 2021, Scot Barbour re-mastered the film in 4k and re-released it with new visual effects on streaming platforms.
