= Spin the World =

Studio album by Royal Crescent Mob
- Released: 1989
- Genres: Funk, rock
- Label: Sire
- Producers: Richard Goetterer, Royal Crescent Mob

Royal Crescent Mob chronology
Something New, Old and Borrowed (1988)	Spin the World (1989)	Midnight Rose's (1991)

Singles from Spin the World
- 1. "Hungry" Released: 1989

Spin the World is an album by the American band Royal Crescent Mob, released in 1989. It was the band's major label debut. They supported the album with a North American tour.

The album's single, "Hungry", peaked at No. 27 on Billboard's Modern Rock Tracks chart.

== Production ==
The album was produced by Richard Goetterer and the band. "Big Show" is about the Beatles' first appearance on The Ed Sullivan Show.

== Critical reception ==
Professional ratings
Review scores
Source	Rating
AllMusic	3/5 stars
Robert Christgau	A−
MusicHound R&B: The Essential Album Guide	2.5/5 stars
The Rolling Stone Album Guide	3.5/5 stars
The State	3/5 stars

Trouser Press wrote: "Reaching the majors, the Mob tightened its instrumental wig and reduced funk to a smaller component of its personality, making Spin the World good and credible, but only as far as it goes." Robert Christgau determined that, "bridging the modest distance between Ohio Players fans and Aerosmith-for-the-fun-of-it, they lock into their groove and don't give a single song away." The Los Angeles Times said that "the album’s blend of hip attitude and down-to-earth Berry/Stones fundamentals makes it a notice-serving LP."

The Washington Post praised the "new-found eclecticism in [the band's] songwriting." The Chicago Tribune thought that Spin the World "reinforces the energetic, but repetitious, heavy funk of their first releases by adding some diversity and pop hooks." The Atlanta Journal-Constitution called it "a crisp, collection of fun songs that range from a rap tribute to the day [frontman David] Ellison's mother met the Beatles ('The Big Show') to a driving ode to food and lust ('Let Me Eat') to a breakup song ('5 More Minutes') that could have come from the Rolling Stones' vault of unreleased tunes." The State declared: "These guys are having fun—and that's one of rock 'n' roll's prime directives."

The Rolling Stone Album Guide wrote that Spin the World "finds the band in its glory ... [the writing] shows strong pop instincts."

== Track listing ==
No.	Title	Length
1.	"Big Show"
2.	"Hungry"
3.	"5 More Minutes"
4.	"Walkin Down the Street"
5.	"Corporation Enema"
6.	"Nanana"
7.	"Silver Street"
8.	"Stock Car Race"
9.	"Goin to the Hospital"
10.	"Tundra"
