= Midnight Rose's =

Studio album by Royal Crescent Mob
- Released: 1991
- Genres: Funk, punk funk, funk rock
- Label: Sire
- Producer: Eric Calvi

Royal Crescent Mob chronology
Spin the World (1989)	Midnight Rose's (1991)	13 Destruction (1992)

Singles from Midnight Rose's
- 1. "Konk" Released: 1991

Midnight Rose's is an album by the American band Royal Crescent Mob, released in 1991. The first single was "Konk". The band supported the album with a North American tour. Royal Crescent Mob was dropped from Sire Records after the release of Midnight Rose's.

== Production ==
The album was produced by Eric Calvi. As on previous albums, the band was influenced by fellow Ohioans the Ohio Players. "Pretty Good Life" is an examination of the yuppie lifestyle. "I'm Sayin'" is about a marriage proposal. "Mt. Everest" is about a romantic relationship with an extremely tall woman. "Timebomb" contains a rap verse. Singer David Ellison played harmonica on the album.

== Critical reception ==
Professional ratings
Review scores
Source	Rating
AllMusic	3/5 stars
The Buffalo News	4/5 stars
Robert Christgau	(neither)
The Cincinnati Post	4/5 stars
Dayton Daily News	3/4 stars
MusicHound Rock: The Essential Album Guide	2/5 stars
Orlando Sentinel	3/5 stars
The Rolling Stone Album Guide	2.5/5 stars

Newsday stated: "In the tradition of the Ohio Players and the other '70s funkateers they grew up listening to, Royal Crescent Mob takes a conscious stand against the notion of significance... As long as Royal Crescent Mob persists with this bizarre modesty, they'll be one of rock's best kept secrets." The Orlando Sentinel wrote that on the album's best track "the group ... abandons its funkateering and comes up with some delightfully loopy rock. 'Drunkard's Nose' combines a New Orleans rhythmic feel and swampy horns with country-flavored licks and one of the most original subjects ever for a rock song—the nose of the title and alcoholic's deteriorating looks." Trouser Press determined that guitarist Mr. B "colors the songs in with cogent flashes of aptly aimed guitar as the rhythm section sets the rhythmic clock in motion."

The Philadelphia Inquirer noted that "the only chink in the Mob's armor is that some of its songs exist only as one-dimensional grooves, with Ellison wisecracking over them." The Houston Chronicle opined that, "where the [Red Hot Chili] Peppers thrash and bash and peel their clothes off in concert, the Mob layers melody, lyrical wit and subtle grooves to the attack, never more evident on Midnight Rose's." The Austin American-Statesman concluded that, "where so many bands with similar influences ... seem to think that establishing a style is mainly a matter of extending cliches toward the point of parody, the Mob has real songs to go with its real grooves."

== Track listing ==
No.	Title	Length
1.	"Ramblin'"
2.	"Big Mistake"
3.	"Apples"
4.	"Konk"
5.	"Mt. Everest"
6.	"I'm Sayin'"
7.	"Pretty Good Life"
8.	"Woodsnake"
9.	"Timebomb"
10.	"Drunkard's Nose"
