= Satchel (band) =

American band

- Satchel in 1994

Background information
- Origin: Seattle, Washington
- Genres: Alternative rock
- Years active: 1991–2019
- Labels: Epic Records
- Spinoff of: Brad, Pigeonhed, Malfunkshun, Head Hunters
- Members: Regan Hagar; John Hoag
- Past members: Shawn Smith; Cory Kane; Jefferson Bennett; Mike Berg

Satchel was an alternative rock band from Seattle. Their final lineup featured Shawn Smith (vocals, piano, guitar, bass), Regan Hagar (drums, bass), and John Hoag (guitar, bass).

== History ==
Satchel was originally formed under the name Bliss by vocalist Shawn Smith and drummer Regan Hagar, after their previous band Brad (which also featured guitarist Stone Gossard) went on hiatus. They recruited guitarist John Hoag, bassist Cory Kane and Jefferson Bennett on saxophone. However they were met with a copyright name challenge. As a result, they settled on the name Satchel. Bennett left the band.

Satchel released their first album EDC in 1994. Some of EDC's song titles were taken from the character's names in the film Reservoir Dogs, one of the band's favorite movies. Satchel went on tour to support the album.

In early 1995, the bassist Cory Kane was replaced by Mike Berg because of personality conflicts. They released their second album, The Family, in 1996, which was co-produced by Stone Gossard. Again, the band embarked on a long tour. At the end of the tour, Smith and Hagar were invited by Gossard to reform Brad, an invitation they accepted. As a result, Hoag quit the band and Satchel went on hiatus. In 2005, Brad released Brad vs. Satchel, an album of previously unreleased tracks from both Satchel and Brad.

Satchel returned in 2010 with Smith (vocals/piano/bass), Hagar (drums/bass), and Hoag (guitar/bass). Touring bassists include former member Mike Berg, Jeff Fielder, and Lonnie Marshall. The new line-up recorded an album, Heartache and Honey, which was released in early 2010. A song, "The Return of...", was available (streaming) on their official website. Shawn Smith's record label Sound vs Silence was releasing a compilation CD which includes an exclusive non-album track, "Shoulder to Shoulder".

Smith died at his home in Seattle on April 3, 2019, of a torn aorta and high blood pressure.

== In popular culture ==
- The song "Suffering" was featured in the films Beautiful Girls and The Girl Next Door. It was also featured in an episode of the TV series One Tree Hill.
- The song "Walk in Freedom" can be heard in the movie Strange Days.

== Discography ==
=== Albums ===
- EDC (1994)
- The Family (1996)
- Heartache and Honey (2010)

=== Compilation ===
- Brad vs Satchel (2005)
