= Brad (band) =

American rock band

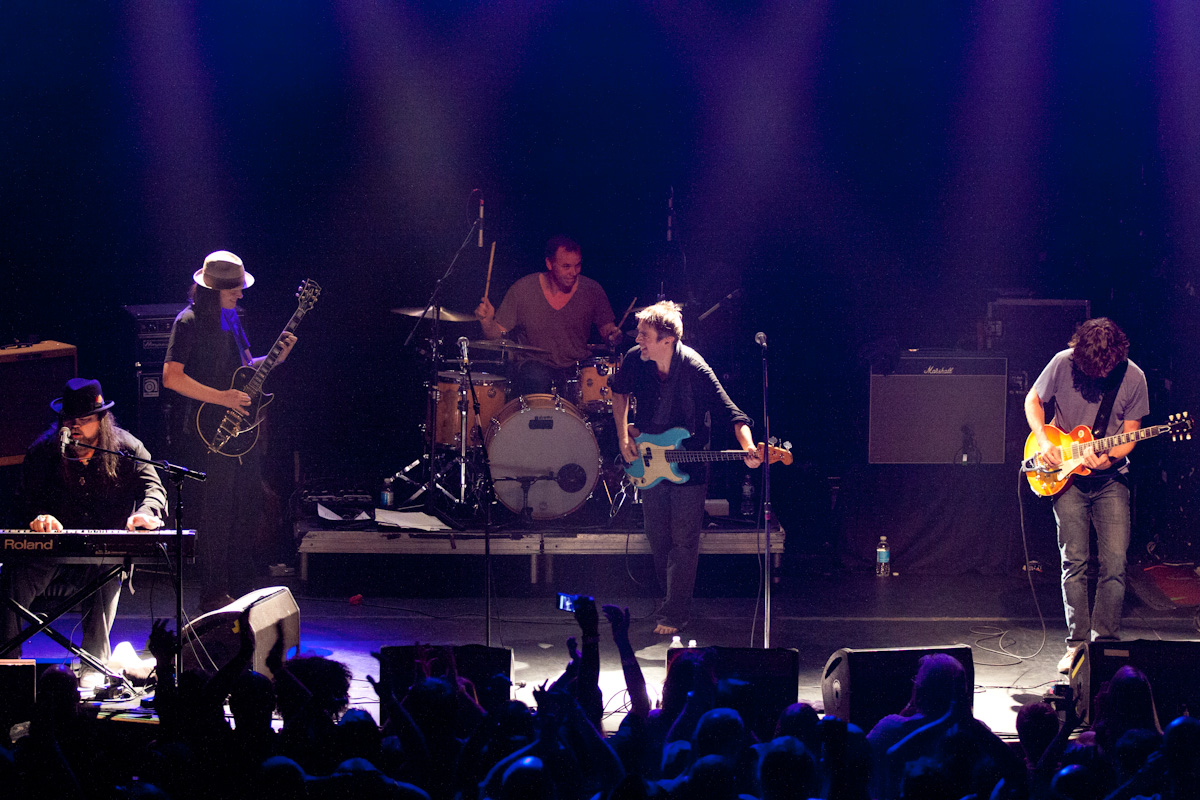
- Brad performing at Gramercy Theatre in New York City 2012

Background information
- Origin: Seattle, Washington, United States
- Genres: Alternative rock; grunge; neo-psychedelia
- Years active: 1992–present
- Labels: Epic; Redline
- Members: Stone Gossard; Regan Hagar; Keith Lowe; Happy Chichester
- Past members: Shawn Smith; Jeremy Toback; Mike Berg

Brad was an American rock band that formed in Seattle, Washington in 1992. Their sound was influenced by the wide variety of influences brought by its members, including Stone Gossard of Pearl Jam, Regan Hagar (of Satchel and formerly a member of Malfunkshun), Shawn Smith (a member of Pigeonhed and also of Satchel), and Jeremy Toback.

== History ==
Brad formed officially in 1992, although the band members had been playing together for a long time before that. The band's line-up was composed of vocalist Shawn Smith, guitarist Stone Gossard, bassist Jeremy Toback, and drummer Regan Hagar. The band originally wanted to go by the name Shame; however, the band found that the name was already taken by a band featuring musician Brad Wilson. Instead, the band took the name Brad and decided to name its debut album Shame. Shame, released on April 27, 1993, through Epic Records, was recorded in 17 days, with many tracks taken from in-studio jam sessions. Shame, featuring a raw sound and an eclectic mix of styles, was released to mixed reviews and moderate sales. The track "20th Century" was a minor hit in the UK.

The band's follow-up album, Interiors, released on June 24, 1997, was much more polished. Tom Moon of Rolling Stone said that "what's most notable about Interiors...is the pure pop focus of these nuanced compositions." The lead single from Interiors, "The Day Brings", features Mike McCready from Pearl Jam on lead guitar. Interiors was met with poor sales; however, the band saw its cult audience expand. The album was accompanied by a tour in the United States and Canada that same year, as well as a small tour in Australia and New Zealand in 1998.

A third album, Welcome to Discovery Park, was released on August 13, 2002, through Redline Records. The recording of Welcome to Discovery Park saw contributions from Mike Berg, who had taken over as the touring bassist for Toback. The album mixes the rawness of Shame and the polished, produced sound of Interiors. Bradley Torreano of AllMusic called it "another quality album that still leaves the listener hungry overall for some better songs." In July 2005, the band released an album of unreleased and incomplete Brad and Satchel tracks called Brad vs Satchel through The Establishment Store.

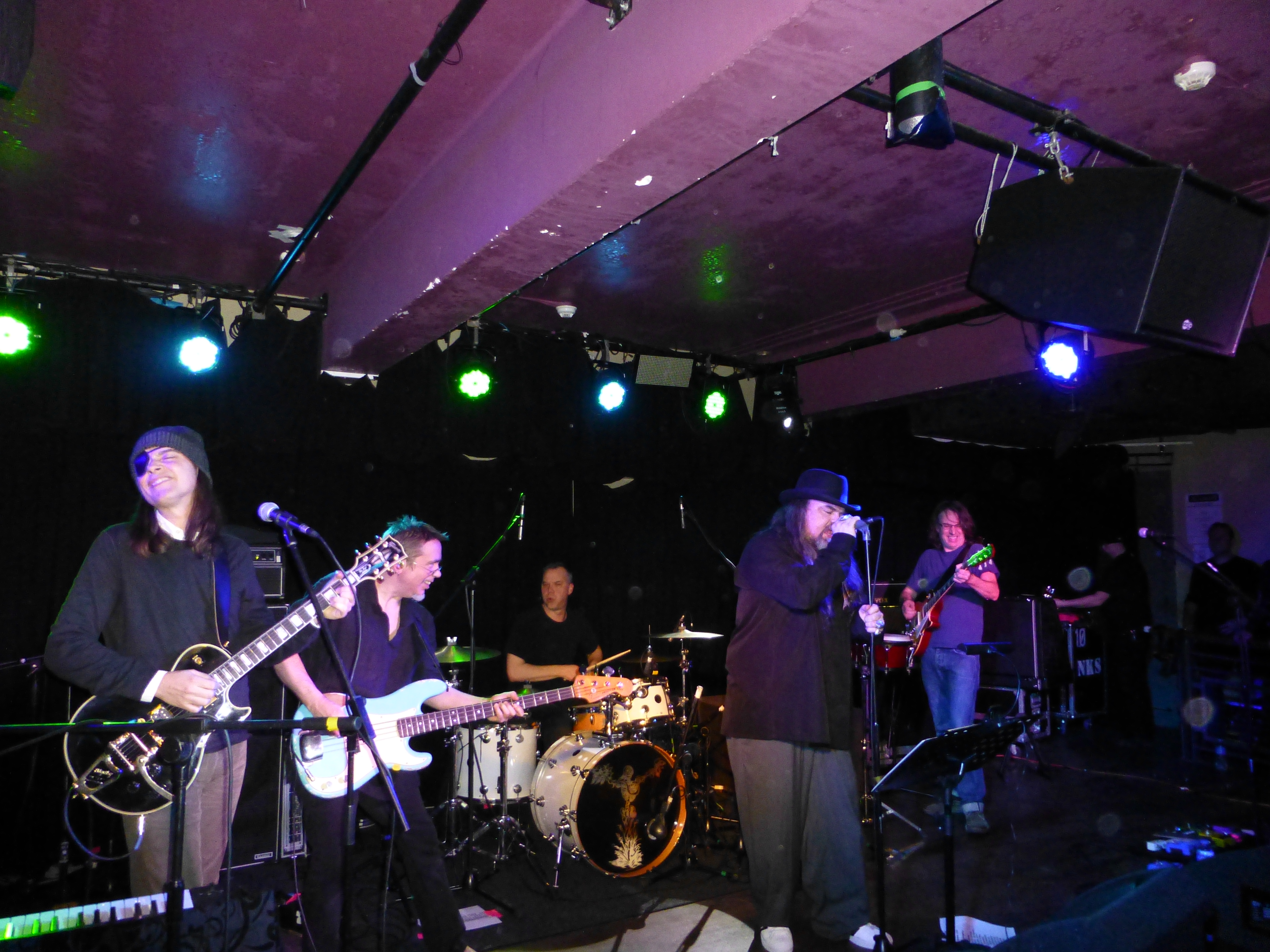
Brad playing on their opening date of their European tour in Manchester, England on February 8, 2013.

The band's fourth studio album, tentatively titled Best Friends? was recorded in 2003 and was being prepared for release in 2006. In September 2007, the album was still awaiting release as the band reunited for a small series of live performances, starting in October 2007, with Kevin Wood (of Malfunkshun) joining the band as an additional guitarist. Songs from the forthcoming Best Friends? album were played at the 2007 and 2008 performances.

Brad performed live at Seattle's Showbox on April 14, 2010, and news about 'Best Friends?' imminent release was posted on their official website. The album was released on August 10, 2010, through the Pearl Jam website. Brad toured the U.S. with Band of Horses in support of the album.

In 2011 the band announced that they would record and perform on a more permanent basis and signed a new record deal with Razor & Tie. The band spent many months in the recording studio for what would become their fifth record United We Stand. United We Stand was released on April 28, 2012, followed by a short US tour. Later that year their first European tour was announced which started in February 2013.

Smith died at his home in Seattle on April 3, 2019, of a torn aorta and high blood pressure.

On April 3, 2023, the fourth anniversary of Smith's passing, the Brad Facebook page announced their final album, featuring the songs they were working on with Smith in 2019 when he died, would be released in summer, titled In The Moment That You're Born. The album was released on July 28, 2023.

== Band members ==
Current

- Stone Gossard – guitars; occasional keyboards, bass, percussion and drums (1992–present)
- Regan Hagar – drums, percussion; occasional guitars and keyboards (1992–present)
- Keith Lowe – bass (2008–present)

Former

- Shawn Smith – vocals, keyboards; occasional guitars, bass, percussion and drums (1992–2019; died 2019)
- Jeremy Toback – bass; occasional vocals and keyboards (1992–1997)
- Mike Berg – bass; occasional keyboards and guitars (1997–2005)

Additional personnel

- James Hall – guitars, keyboards (1997)
- Matt Brown – guitars, keyboards (1997)
- Elizabeth Pupo-Walker – percussion (2001–2002)
- Thaddeus Turner – guitars, bass (2001–2002)
- Kevin Wood – guitar (2007)
- Happy Chichester – guitar, keyboards, backing vocals (2010–present)

Timeline

== Discography ==
=== Studio albums ===
Year	Album details
1993	Shame: Released: April 27, 1993; Label: Epic; Format: CD, cassette (CS), LP
1997	Interiors: Released: June 24, 1997; Label: Epic; Format: CD, CS, LP
2002	Welcome to Discovery Park: Released: August 13, 2002; Label: Redline; Format: CD
2010	Best Friends?: Released: August 10, 2010; Label: Monkey Wrench; Format: CD
2012	United We Stand: Released: April 24, 2012; Label: Razor & Tie; Format: CD
2023	In The Moment That You’re Born: Released: July 28, 2023; Label: Loosegroove; Format: Vinyl, Streaming

=== Compilations ===
Year	Album details
2005	Brad vs Satchel: Released: July 26, 2005; Label: The Establishment Store; Format: CD

=== Singles ===
Year	Single	UK peak chart position	Album
1993	"Screen"/"Buttercup"	—	Shame
1993	"20th Century"	64	Shame
1997	"The Day Brings"	—	Interiors
1997	"Secret Girl"	—	Interiors
2003	"La, La, La"	—	Welcome to Discovery Park
2003	"Shinin'"	—	Welcome to Discovery Park
2003	"Revolution"	—	Welcome to Discovery Park
2012	"Waters Deep"/"Don't Cry"	—	United We Stand
2017	"Hey Now What's The Problem"/"Pieces of Sky in My Hand"	—	In The Moment That You’re Born
"—" denotes singles that did not chart.

== See also ==
- List of alternative rock artists
