= Happy Chichester =

American singer-songwriter and musician

- Origin: Columbus, Ohio, US
- Genres: Alternative rock
- Occupation: Singer-songwriter
- Instruments: Vocals, guitar, keyboards, drums
- Years active: 1985–present
- Label: PopFly Music
- Website: happychichester.com

Harold "Happy" Chichester is an American singer-songwriter and musician.

== Early life, education and personal life ==
Chichester resides in the Columbus, Ohio, area, where he began making music in 1986.

== Career ==
=== Royal Crescent Mob ===
Happy's first band of note was the 1980s rock/funk group the Royal Crescent Mob in which he played bass. Formed in 1985, the Royal Crescent Mob were renowned for their live performances. They signed a major label deal with Sire Records and released six albums. They toured with The Replacements, The B-52's and others and were once featured in Seventeen magazine. After nine years with the band, Happy left to pursue a solo career. Happy was replaced by Ben Pridgeon, but the band dissolved within a few years. They all remain friends.

=== The Afghan Whigs and The Twilight Singers ===
Having been friends with Greg Dulli since the days when The Afghan Whigs used to open for the Royal Crescent Mob, Happy has often lent his talents to Greg Dulli's projects The Afghan Whigs and The Twilight Singers. Happy provided vocals, songwriting and various instruments to Afghan Whigs releases Gentlemen (1993) and Black Love (1996).

He was also a founding member of The Twilight Singers. He appears heavily on their first album, Twilight As Played by the Twilight Singers (2000). Happy toured as a keyboardist with both the Afghan Whigs and the Twilight Singers. On Greg Dulli's 2005 solo album Amber Headlights, Happy provided drums to the song "So Tight."

=== Howlin' Maggie ===
Happy met bassist Jim Rico at Ohio University; so when Happy started Howlin' Maggie in January 1994, Jim was the first person he called. During the following months, guitarist Andy Harrison, trumpeter Randy Sanders and drummer Jerome Dillon were added to the line up, and in 1995 the band signed a recording deal with Columbia Records, releasing the critically acclaimed Honeysuckle Strange on April 9, 1996. The band toured extensively with the Afghan Whigs, but by the late '90s, the original lineup was dissolved.

Chichester bought himself out of his record deal with Columbia Records and his wife, Laura, founded PopFly Records and signed Chichester as her first artist. In 2001, the label released its first CD, Howlin' Maggie's Hyde. Chichester recruited guitarist Lance Ellison, former Royal Crescent Mob drummer Carlton Smith, and bassist Christian Hurd. After two US tours in support of the album, Happy decided to take a solo approach and disbanded Howlin' Maggie. Although they played their last shows in the summer of 2002, Howlin' Maggie reunited for a single show in Columbus, Ohio on November 24, 2010. Proceeds for the show was to benefit a children's charities and memorial fund established after the passing of a local DJ, CD101's Andy "Andyman" Davis.

=== Solo ===
After Howlin' Maggie, Chichester continued to write songs and play live. In 2002 Shawn Smith invited Happy to support his band Brad on their national tour and open all the shows. The experience was inspiring, and Chichester began to periodically hit the road to see how audiences reacted to his new songs, while spending his days off the road in his studio to record his first solo album.

A performance at the Aladdin Theater in Portland, Oregon, on March 28, 2003 (which was recorded for the price of a pint of beer) became an underground hit. He had recorded and produced a limited, numbered pressing of the show in Portland, copies of which were eventually selling on eBay for $50. Eventually, the live album was officially released through PopFly Music.

Lovers Come Back, Happy's first full-length studio solo album, was released by PopFly Music on February 14, 2007. In support of the album, he headed out on an extensive tour of the United States and Europe (while opening for RJD2) to promote the album. He continues to tour and record as a solo artist to a growing and cultish underground following.
