= Howlin Maggie =

American band

Howlin' Maggie
- Howlin Maggie

Background information
- Origin: Columbus, Ohio, United States
- Genres: Alternative rock
- Years active: 1994–2002
- Labels: Columbia, PopFly Music

Howlin' Maggie was a four-piece band founded by (and fronted by) Harold "Happy" Chichester in Columbus, Ohio, in 1994. Chichester was previously the bassist for Royal Crescent Mob, and is also a founding member of The Twilight Singers with Greg Dulli of The Afghan Whigs.

The band's debut album, Honeysuckle Strange, was released on Columbia Records in 1996 to critical praise. Chichester commands most of the album credits, racking up vocals, keyboards, guitars, and producer duties. Honeysuckle Strange is an eleven song album that draws from a variety of musical seasonings, and deals with a myriad of social issues, such as substance abuse, relationships, and the seedy underbelly of the music industry. The album includes two minor radio hits – "Alcohol" and "I'm a Slut" – both of which found sporadic airplay on independent and corporate alt rock stations in the mid-1990s.

Chichester reworked the band's lineup for 2001's Hyde, but retired the band almost two years thereafter.

Howlin' Maggie reunited for a one-off show in Columbus, Ohio on November 24, 2010, along with Columbus bands Earwig, X-Rated Cowboys, Willie Phoenix Band, Watershed, and The Toll. Proceeds for the show went to benefit CD101 for the Kids charities and the memorial fund established after the passing of legendary CD101 DJ Andy "Andyman" Davis.

The soundtrack to the 1996 movie Beautiful Girls features Howlin' Maggie's "Easy to Be Stupid".

== Band members by album ==
- Honeysuckle Strange – Harold Chichester, Andy Harrison, Jim Rico, Jerome Dillon.
- Hyde – Harold Chichester, Lance Ellison, Christian Hurd, Carlton Smith.

== Discography ==
1996	Honeysuckle Strange
1.	Miss Universe
2.	Alcohol
3.	Rubbing The Industry Raw
4.	Promise To Be Happy
5.	I'm A Slut
6.	You Are
7.	Jawbreaker
8.	How The West Was Won
9.	Motel Room
10.	$3.99
11.	Long Live Doug (Standing)

2001	Hyde
1.	Nobody Calls Her Baby
2.	Where My Funky People
3.	Lookin’ Out My Window
4.	If I Could Murder The Right Man
5.	Elephant Runs Amok
6.	On The List/Organ Grinder
7.	Jawbreaker
8.	Love Is All Around x 4
9.	FWINA
10.	Friday Nite
11.	Is It Really Right
