= Shield of Thorns =

Studio album by Shawn Smith
- Released: 2003
- Genre: Alternative
- Label: Establishment Store (2 pressings), Sound Vs. Silence/Gator Records (2nd re-issue)

Shawn Smith chronology
Live at the Point (2000)	Shield of Thorns (2003)	The Cedarwood EP (2007)

Professional ratings
Review scores
Source	Rating
AllMusic	4/5 stars

Shield of Thorns is an album by Seattle musician Shawn Smith.

== Track listing ==
1. "Leaving California"
2. "Shield of Thorns"
3. "Golden Age"
4. "Wrapped In My Memory"
5. "Full Moon Over Dallas"
6. "If Roses Take My Place"
7. "The Dark"
8. "Sing That Song For Beauty"
