= Shawn Smith (musician) =

American musician (1965–2019)

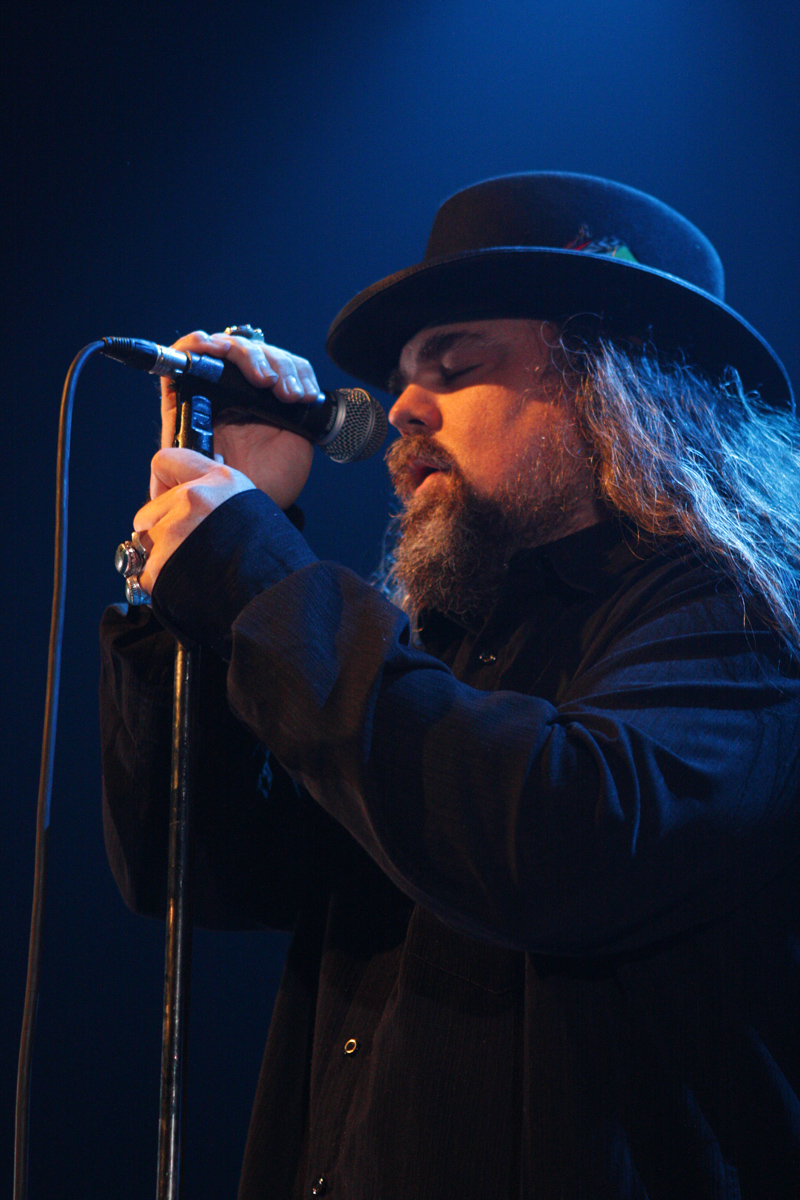
- Smith in 2012

Background information
- Born: October 28, 1965; Spokane, Washington, U.S.
- Died: April 3, 2019 (aged 53) Seattle, Washington, U.S.
- Years active: 1991–2019
- Labels: Epic (Sony) & Redline Entertainment (Brad & Satchel); Sub Pop (Pigeonhed); 818 Music & Establishment Store^{Sound Vs. Silence/Gator Records (solo albums)}
- Formerly of: Satchel; Brad; Pigeonhed; The Twilight Singers

Shawn Smith (October 28, 1965 – April 3, 2019) was an American singer, songwriter and musician. He was a member of the Seattle-based alternative and indie rock bands Brad, Satchel, Pigeonhed, and The Twilight Singers, and also performed as a solo artist.

Smith cited Freddie Mercury, Prince, and Kiss as early influences. Other influences he noted are Steven Tyler, Bon Scott, Elton John, Stevie Wonder, Ice Cube, Snoop Dogg, Andy Wood, and Chris Cornell.

== Biography ==
Smith was born in Spokane, Washington, in 1965 and attended high school in Bakersfield, California, relocating to Seattle in 1987. He befriended drummer Regan Hagar while both were working at Tower Records in the late ‘80s. The pair formed Satchel shortly thereafter, and eventually, formed Brad with Stone Gossard and Jeremy Toback. In an interview from 2014, Smith said that the main songwriters in Brad were he and Gossard.

Brad would go on to release six studio albums during their career (Shame, Interiors, Welcome to Discovery Park, Best Friends?, United We Stand, and In The Moment That You're Born) and Satchel would issue three studio albums (EDC, The Family, and Heartache and Honey), while both bands would share credit for a compilation (Brad vs. Satchel).

Smith's only major chart hit came in 1999, when the British techno group Lo Fidelity Allstars remixed the Pigeonhed song "Battle Flag" and released it as a single. The song, credited to "Lo Fidelity Allstars feat. Pigeonhed", reached #6 on Billboard's Alternative Songs chart in July 1999.

In 2005, Smith unveiled a musical project called The Diamond Hand, involving various musicians. He also worked with Thaddeus Turner (formerly of Maktub and Brad), under the name Forever Breakers.

"From the North" was Shawn's newest band with core members of Malfunkshun (Regan Hagar, Kevin Wood, Cory Kane) and the lyrics left by the late Andrew Wood. Since 2006, the band has also been billed as "Power of Wings" and "Von Nord" (allegedly meaning "From the North" in German; whereas this actually reads "vom Norden" or "aus dem Norden"). Hagar has since been replaced by Seattle drummer Mike Hommel. The band changed its name in July 2008 to All Hail the Crown and planned to release new music under this banner.

Also in 2008, Smith appeared on the album Lotuk by Arsenal. Smith was interviewed for and featured throughout the 2009 book, Grunge Is Dead: The Oral History of Seattle Rock Music. On April 14, 2010, the four surviving members of Mother Love Bone reunited for the first time in twenty years, with Smith serving as frontman, as part of a sold-out "Brad and Friends" evening at Seattle's Showbox.

In November 2015, Smith joined the band Sweet Water for a one-off performance at Seattle's Benaroya Hall. The show was performed with a full orchestra.

Smith was found dead on April 3, 2019, at his home in Seattle. A later autopsy determined he died April 3 of a torn aorta and high blood pressure. At the time of his death, Smith was working on a new studio album with Brad.

On April 27, 2023, the surviving members of Brad announced that on July 28 they would release the album In the Moment That You're Born containing some of their final recordings with Smith.

== Discography ==
=== Solo ===
- Let It All Begin (1999)
- Live at the Point (2000)
- Shield of Thorns (2003)
- The Cedarwood EP (2007)
- The Diamond Hand (2008)
- Sunshine (2011)
- SKELETON KEYS – A Collection of Home Recordings and Non-Album Tracks 1989–2003 – Volumes 1-7 (2011)
- Grass and Sky EP (2013)
- Kid Bakersfield (2013)
- The Secret Life of People EP (2016)

=== Brad ===
- Shame (1993)
- Interiors (1997)
- Welcome to Discovery Park (2002)
- Brad vs Satchel (2005)
- Best Friends? (2010)
- United We Stand (2012)
- In The Moment That You're Born (2023)

=== Satchel ===
- EDC (1994)
- The Family (1996)
- Brad vs Satchel (2005)
- Heartache and Honey (2010)

=== Pigeonhed ===
- Pigeonhed (1993)
- The Full Sentence (1997)
- Pigeonhed's Flash Bulb Emergency Overflow Cavalcade of Remixes (1997)
- Des Colores (TBA)

=== Malfunkshun ===
- Monument (2010)

=== All Hail the Crown ===
- All Hail the Crown (2011)

=== Compilation ===
- Deer Lodge George Jones (2014)

== Television ==
"Shake It (Like You Just Made Bail)", a song that remained unreleased until Shawn Smith made it available in digital format in 2007, was featured in the background of the cocaine scene of the "Proshai, Livushka" episode of The Sopranos (third season, 2001). "Leaving California" and "Wrapped in My Memory" from Smith's solo album Shield of Thorns were both featured prominently on the "Long Term Parking" episode of The Sopranos (fifth season, 2004). Yet another Shawn Smith related song has been featured on the show: Pigeonhed's "Battle Flag" appeared on the "46 Long" episode (first season, 1999) and was later included on "The Sopranos: Peppers & Eggs: Music from the HBO Original Series".

"Battle Flag" has also been featured in a season six episode of NBC's prime-time medical drama ER, season three episode eleven of Showtime's drama Queer as Folk (US), as well as a season one episode of The WB's Smallville. It has also been featured in the film Coyote Ugly and the trailer for Charlie's Angels.
