= Weapon of Choice (band) =

American funk band

- Genre: Nutmeg
- Years active: 1992–present
- Labels: Loosegroove, Nuttsactor 5, Funk To The Max, Ter a Terre
- Members: Lonnie "Meganut" Marshall; Spankie; Marc Rey; Lamont Sydnor; Elizabeth Lea; John Kirby
- Past members: Keefus Ciancia; Finn Hammer; Tom-bone Ralls; Scott Garrett; Audra Cunningham; Jellybean; Derek "D-Rek" Pierce; Mark Cross; Gabby Lang; Mary Harris; Arik Marshall; James Gray; Zack Najors; Trevor Lawrence; Todd Simon; Tracy Wannomae

Weapon of Choice is a band from Los Angeles fronted by bass player Lonnie Marshall. They play a mixture of rock, alternative, funk, hip hop, jazz and reggae which Marshall dubbed "Nutmeg". Others refer to their music as P-Funk style music.

The band was created after the breakup of Marshall's previous band 'Marshall Law' (which included his guitarist brother Arik Marshall, short-term member of Red Hot Chili Peppers in 1992-93). The band signed with Stone Gossard's record label Loosegroove after he saw a video for Marshall Law's Uppity Yuppity. The band went to Seattle and recorded their first album Nut-Meg Sez "Bozo the Town" which was released in 1994. They released two more albums with Loosegroove, Highperspice in 1996 and Nutmeg Phantasy in 1998. The later record was compilation released as benefit album for musical instruments in schools. When Loosegrove folded Weapon of Choice were left without a record company.

A version of the band's song "Nutty Nut-Meg Phantasy", titled "My Nutmeg Phantasy" appears on her 2001 album, The Id. Gray's version features various members of Weapon of Choice, including Marshall, performing on the track. The Tom Morello mix of "My Nutmeg Phantasy" was also included on the soundtrack to the 2002 film Spider-Man. Gray is also seen performing the song in the film.

In 2002 they released Illoominutty (recorded in 1997) on Fishbone's independent label Nuttsactor 5. In 2004 Funk To The Max and Ter a Terre put out another compilation album Color Me Funky.

The band dissolved with various members moving on to work on their own projects.

== Members ==
- Lonnie "Meganut" Marshall (bass, lead vocals)
- Spankie (vocals, bellydance, hiptonite)
- Marc Rey (guitar)
- Lamont Sydnor (drums)
- Elizabeth Lea (trombone, vocals)
- John Kirby (keys, talkbox)

== Discography ==
Albums

- Nut-Meg Sez "Bozo the Town" (1994) Loosegroove / Sony
- Highperspice (1996) Loosegroove / Sony 550
- Nutmeg Phantasy (1998) Loosegroove, Compil.
- Illoominutty (2001) Nuttsactor 5
- Color Me Funky (2003) Funk To The Max, Ter a Terre, Compil. and 3 new tracks
- Meganut's WOC Party (2013)
- rEAllyRelEVANt (2013)
- tiMelESs (2013)

DVD

- Uncut Nut: 1992-2006 - The Definitive DVD Collection
