= Pigeonhed =

American electronic band from Seattle

- Origin: Seattle, Washington, U.S.
- Genres: Funk, soul, trip hop, lo-fi
- Years active: 1993–1997, 2010–2019
- Labels: Sub Pop, Fin Records
- Past members: Shawn Smith (deceased); Steve Fisk

Pigeonhed is an American electronic band from Seattle that combines elements of funk, soul, trip hop, and lo-fi. The band is a collaboration of Shawn Smith and Steve Fisk, that released three albums during the period from 1993 to 1997. They reconvened in 2010. In 2015, they announced they were preparing to release their "lost" album 'Des Colores'. As of 2025, no release has been made. Soundgarden lead guitarist Kim Thayil provided significant instrumental contributions to each album. They are best known for their single "Battle Flag", which, as remixed by Lo Fidelity Allstars, enjoyed brief popularity in US and UK clubs and indie radio stations.

== Discography ==
=== Studio albums ===
- Pigeonhed (1993)
- The Full Sentence (1997)

=== Remix albums ===
- Pigeonhed's Flash Bulb Emergency Overflow Cavalcade of Remixes (1997)

=== Singles ===
- "The Power Come Over Me" (2013)
