= Loosegroove Records =

Record label

Loosegroove Records is a Seattle based record label formed by Pearl Jam guitarist Stone Gossard and Brad drummer Regan Hagar in 1994. Initially a subsidiary of Sony before going independent in 1996, Loosegroove signed many up and coming artists from various musical genres, especially rock and hip hop. Significantly, Gossard signed Queens of the Stone Age to Loosegroove, releasing the band's debut album in 1998. Others who worked with Loosegroove include Critters Buggin, Weapon of Choice, Malfunkshun, Devilhead, Prose and Concepts, Ponga, Hi Fi Killers, Nash Kato and Eureka Farm. Loosegroove also released the Seattle Hip Hop Compilation 14 Fathoms Deep in January 1997, and the soundtrack to the movie Chicago Cab in 1998. Loosegroove Records closed in 2000. In 2000 the Loosegroove catalog was acquired by WILL Records, who now operates as Lakeshore Records.

Loosegrove executive Matt Shay later became vice-president of marketing/A&R at J Records, and helped Pearl Jam join said label and release the 2006 album Pearl Jam.

In 2020, a resurrected Loosegroove Records, again overseen by Gossard and Hagar, released the debut of Gossard's side project Painted Shield

In 2021, the label released the album 1982 by the band The Living, which includes Duff McKagan (guitar), Greg Gilmore (drums), John Conte (vocals), and Todd Fleischman (bass). The Living was their teenage punk band in the early 1980s. Brad's final record In The Moment That You’re Born was released on Loosegroove in 2023.
