= Stone Gossard =

American guitarist and songwriter (born 1966)

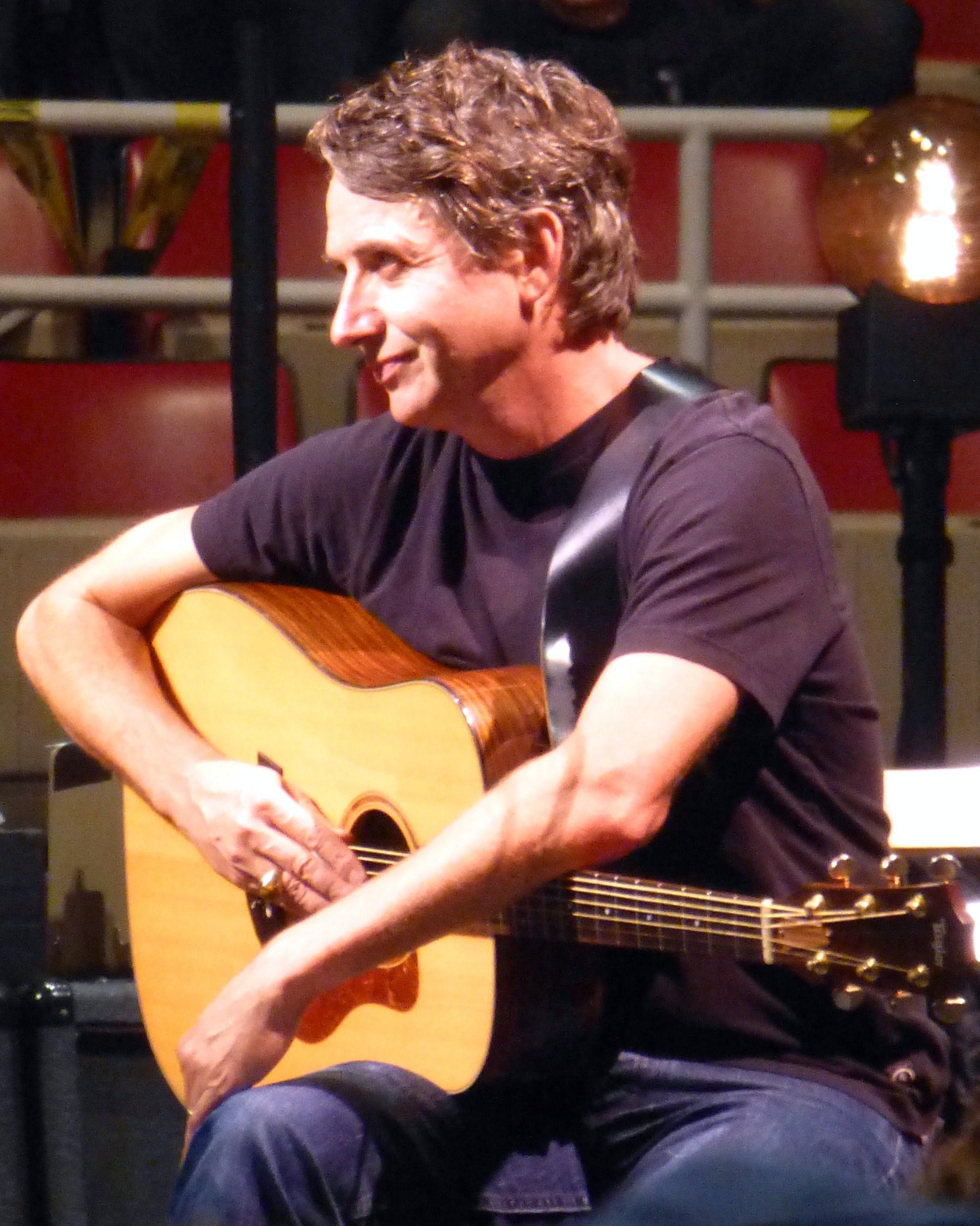
- Gossard in October 2014

Background information
- Also known as: Carpenter Newton
- Born: Stone Carpenter Gossard; July 20, 1966 (age 60); Seattle, Washington, U.S.
- Genres: Alternative rock; grunge; glam punk; punk rock; hard rock; heavy metal; glam metal
- Occupations: Musician; songwriter
- Instruments: Guitar; vocals
- Years active: 1984–present
- Member of: Pearl Jam; Brad
- Formerly of: Green River; Mother Love Bone; Temple of the Dog

Signature
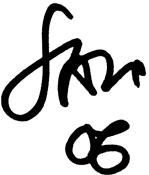

Stone Carpenter Gossard (born July 20, 1966) is an American musician and songwriter who serves as the rhythm guitarist for the rock band Pearl Jam. Along with Jeff Ament, Mike McCready, and Eddie Vedder, he is one of the founding members of the band.

Gossard is also known for his work prior to Pearl Jam with the Seattle-based grunge bands Green River and Mother Love Bone. Gossard was also a member of the bands Temple of the Dog and Brad. In addition to his performing career, he has been active in the music industry as a producer and the owner of a record label and recording studio. He released his first solo album Bayleaf in 2001; his second, Moonlander, followed in 2013.

Gossard was inducted into the Rock and Roll Hall of Fame as a member of Pearl Jam in 2017.

== Biography ==
=== Early life ===
Gossard was born in Seattle to David W. Gossard Jr. and Mary Carolyn Carpenter. His father was a lawyer and his mother worked in the Seattle city government. He has two sisters, Star Leslie Dirette and Shelly Joan Gossard. Gossard attended the Northwest Boarding School in Seattle. The first band Gossard joined was March of Crimes, a band of which future Soundgarden bassist Ben Shepherd was a member, as was novelist Jonathan Evison. Although Gossard's time with the band was brief, it introduced him to the emerging music scene in Seattle. Gossard formed a close friendship with fellow guitarist (and future Mudhoney member) Steve Turner, who also had attended the Northwest School, and joined Turner in his band The Ducky Boys. Turner's interest in punk rock had a significant influence on Gossard, and in turn on the ethos of the band.

=== Green River ===
Turner went on to form Green River with vocalist/guitarist Mark Arm, drummer Alex Vincent and bassist Jeff Ament. Gossard was asked to join Green River in order to allow Arm to concentrate exclusively on singing. By the time the band finished the recording of its debut EP, Come on Down, Turner decided to leave the group, citing his distaste with Ament and Gossard's heavy metal leanings. He was replaced by Ament's former Deranged Diction bandmate, Bruce Fairweather.

The band released the EP Come on Down in 1985 and followed it up with Dry As a Bone in 1987, the first non-compilation release from Sub Pop records. The band's only full-length studio album, Rehab Doll, was released in 1988. In-fighting within the band led to the group's break-up during the recording of Rehab Doll. A stylistic division had developed between Ament and Gossard on one side, and Arm on the other. Ament and Gossard wanted to pursue a major-label deal, while Arm wanted to remain independent, viewing the duo as being too careerist. The band achieved a considerable local reputation in Seattle and had a significant influence on the genre later known as grunge, with Green River being described as "arguably the first grunge band."

=== Mother Love Bone ===
Following Green River's dissolution, Gossard established Mother Love Bone in 1988 along with former Green River members Ament and Fairweather, former Malfunkshun frontman Andrew Wood, and former Ten Minute Warning and Skin Yard drummer Greg Gilmore. The band quickly worked on recording and performing locally and by late 1988 had become one of Seattle's more promising bands. In early 1989 the band signed to PolyGram subsidiary Mercury Records. In March of that year the group issued its debut EP, Shine.

In late 1989 the group returned to the studio to record its debut studio album, Apple. It was planned for a March 1990 release. Only days before the release of Apple, however, frontman Wood, who had a long history with drug problems, overdosed on heroin. After spending a few days in the hospital in a coma, Wood died, effectively bringing Mother Love Bone to an end. Apple would see release later that year.

=== Temple of the Dog ===
Gossard reacquainted himself with childhood friend Mike McCready after watching McCready jam with a local band called Love Chile and being impressed with his work. Gossard had known McCready from before high school when the two would trade rock band pictures with each other. After the demise of Mother Love Bone, he asked McCready if he wanted to play music with him. After a few months of practicing together, McCready in turn encouraged Gossard to reconnect with Ament. The trio were attempting to form their own band when they were invited to be part of the Temple of the Dog project founded by Soundgarden's Chris Cornell as a musical tribute to Wood. Cornell had been Wood's roommate. The band's line-up was completed by the addition of Soundgarden drummer Matt Cameron.

The band started rehearsing songs that Cornell had written on tour prior to Wood's death, as well as reworking some existing material from demos written by Gossard and Ament. Gossard described the recording process as a "non-pressure filled" situation, as there were no expectations or pressure coming from the record company. This project eventually featured vocalist Eddie Vedder, who had arrived in Seattle to audition to be the singer for Ament and Gossard's next band, which later became Pearl Jam, after being sent a tape of Gossard's demos, recording his own lyrics and vocals over the top. Vedder sang a duet with Cornell on the song "Hunger Strike" and provided background vocals on several other songs. The band decided that it had enough material for an entire album and, in April 1991, Temple of the Dog was released through A&M Records. Three of the songs on the final album were musically credited to Gossard, including the single "Pushin Forward Back". Gossard asserted that he thought Wood would be "blown away by the whole thing."

=== Pearl Jam ===
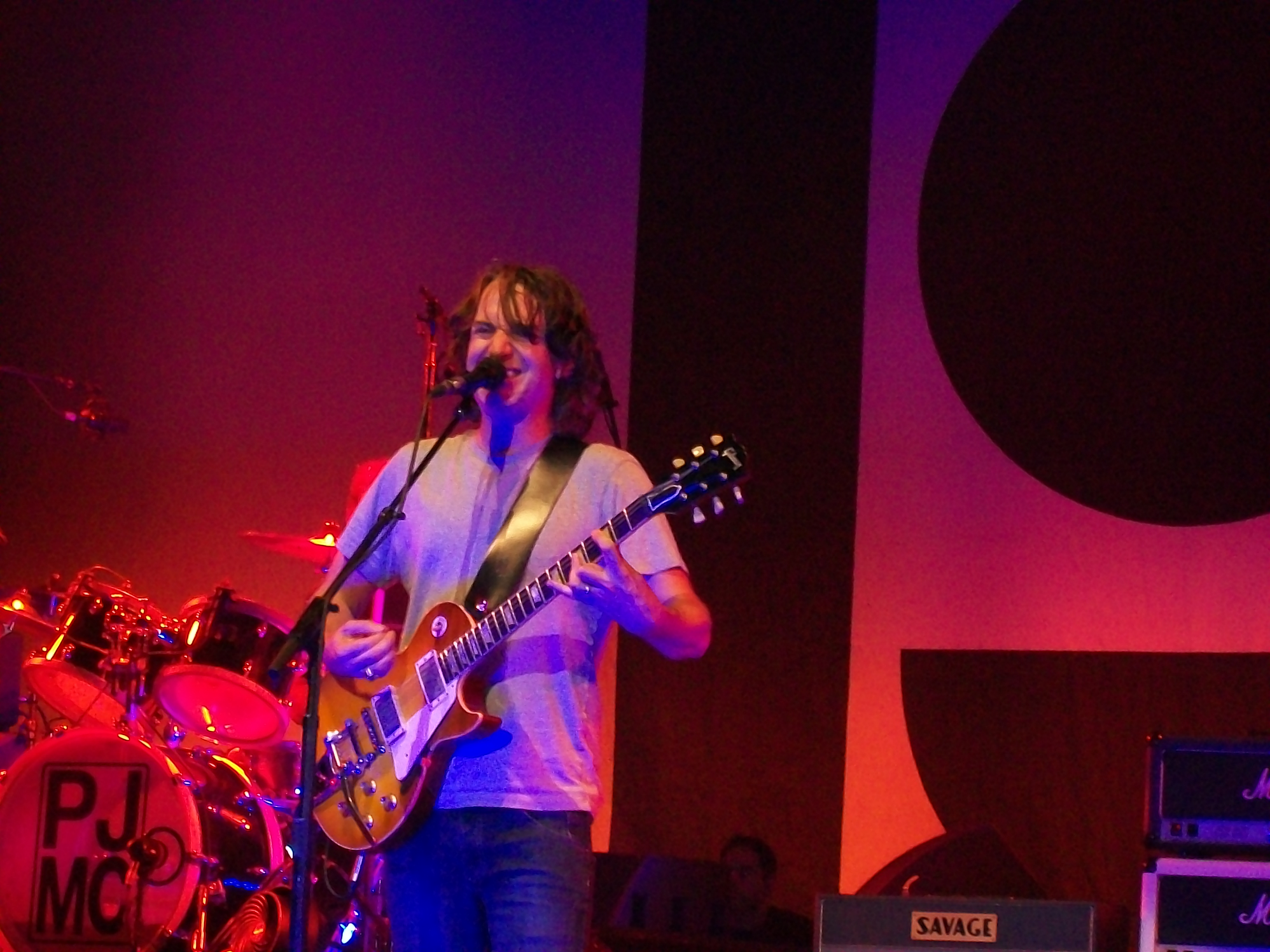
Gossard performing with Pearl Jam, singing lead vocals on "Mankind", in Oslo, Norway in July 2012

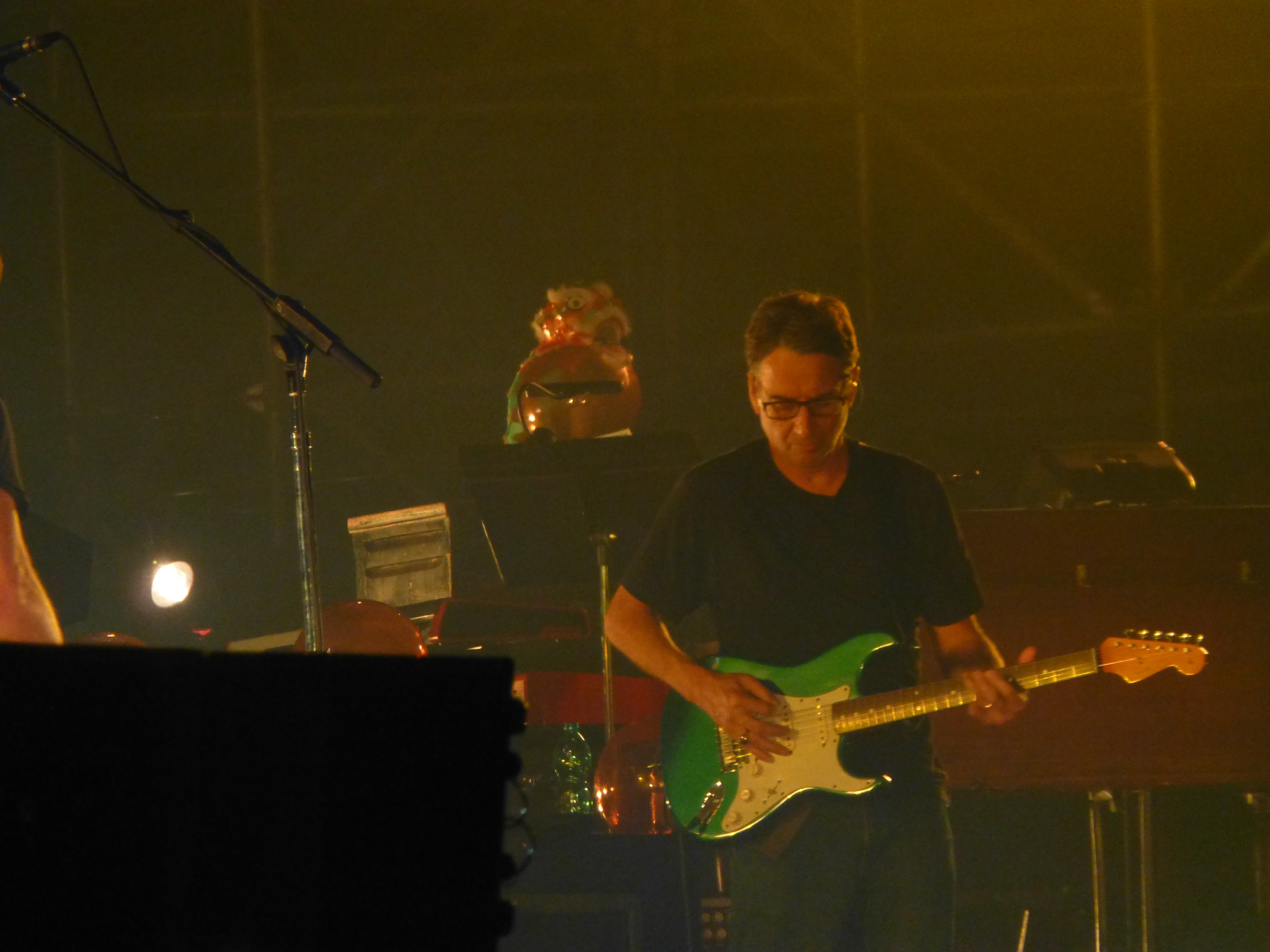
Gossard on stage with Pearl Jam, in Padua, Italy in June 2018

Pearl Jam was formed in 1990 by Ament, Gossard, and McCready, who then recruited Vedder and drummer Dave Krusen. The band originally took the name Mookie Blaylock, but was forced to change it when the band signed to Epic Records in 1991. After the recording sessions for Ten were completed, Krusen left Pearl Jam in May 1991. Krusen was replaced by Matt Chamberlain, who had previously played with Edie Brickell & New Bohemians. After playing only a handful of shows, one of which was filmed for the "Alive" video, Chamberlain left to join the Saturday Night Live band. As his replacement, Chamberlain suggested Dave Abbruzzese, who joined the group and played the rest of Pearl Jam's live shows supporting Ten.

Ten broke the band into the mainstream, and became one of the best selling alternative albums of the 1990s. The band found itself amidst the sudden popularity and attention given to the Seattle music scene and the genre known as grunge. The single "Jeremy" received Grammy Award nominations for Best Rock Song and Best Hard Rock Performance in 1993. Pearl Jam received four awards at the 1993 MTV Video Music Awards for its music video for "Jeremy", including Video of the Year and Best Group Video. Ten was ranked number 207 on Rolling Stone magazine's list of the 500 greatest albums of all time, and "Jeremy" was ranked number 11 on VH1's list of the 100 greatest songs of the '90s.

Following an intense touring schedule, the band went into the studio to record what would become its second studio album, Vs., released in 1993. Upon its release, Vs. set at the time the record for most copies of an album sold in a week, and spent five weeks at number one on the Billboard 200. Vs. was nominated for a Grammy Award for Best Rock Album in 1995. From Vs., the song "Daughter" received a Grammy nomination for Best Rock Performance by a Duo or Group with Vocal and the song "Go" received a Grammy nomination for Best Hard Rock Performance.

Feeling the pressures of success, the band decided to decrease the level of promotion for its albums, including refusing to release music videos. In 1994, the band began a much-publicized boycott of Ticketmaster, which lasted for three years and limited the band's ability to tour in the United States. Gossard took an active role during Pearl Jam's dispute with Ticketmaster in 1994 over prices and surcharges. Along with Ament, Gossard testified before a congressional subcommittee, arguing that Ticketmaster's practices were anti-competitive.

Later that same year the band released its third studio album, Vitalogy, which became the band's third straight album to reach multi-platinum status. The album received Grammy nominations for Album of the Year and Best Rock Album in 1996. Vitalogy was ranked number 492 on Rolling Stone magazine's list of the 500 greatest albums of all time. The lead single "Spin the Black Circle" won a Grammy Award in 1996 for Best Hard Rock Performance. Although Abbruzzese performed on the album Vitalogy, he was fired in August 1994, four months before the album was released. The band cited political differences between Abbruzzese and the other members; for example, he disagreed with the Ticketmaster boycott. He was replaced by Jack Irons, a close friend of Vedder and the original drummer of the Red Hot Chili Peppers.

The band subsequently released No Code in 1996 and Yield in 1998. In 1998, prior to Pearl Jam's U.S. Yield Tour, Irons left the band due to dissatisfaction with touring. Pearl Jam enlisted former Soundgarden drummer Matt Cameron as Irons' replacement on an initially temporary basis, but he soon became a permanent replacement for Irons. "Do the Evolution" (from Yield) received a Grammy nomination for Best Hard Rock Performance. In 1998, Pearl Jam recorded "Last Kiss", a cover of a 1960s ballad made famous by J. Frank Wilson and the Cavaliers. It was released on the band's 1998 fan club Christmas single; however, by popular demand, the cover was released to the public as a single in 1999. "Last Kiss" peaked at number two on the Billboard charts and became the band's highest-charting single

In 2000, the band released its sixth studio album, Binaural, and initiated a successful and ongoing series of official bootlegs. The band released seventy-two such live albums in 2000 and 2001, and set a record for most albums to debut in the Billboard 200 at the same time. "Grievance" (from Binaural) received a Grammy nomination for Best Hard Rock Performance. The band released its seventh studio album, Riot Act, in 2002. Pearl Jam's contribution to the 2003 film, Big Fish, "Man of the Hour", was nominated for a Golden Globe Award in 2004. The band's eighth studio album, the eponymous Pearl Jam, was released in 2006. The band released its ninth studio album, Backspacer, in 2009 and its tenth studio album, Lightning Bolt, in 2013. Their eleventh album, Gigaton, was released in 2020. Their latest album Dark Matter released on April 19, 2024

== Other musical projects ==
=== Brad ===
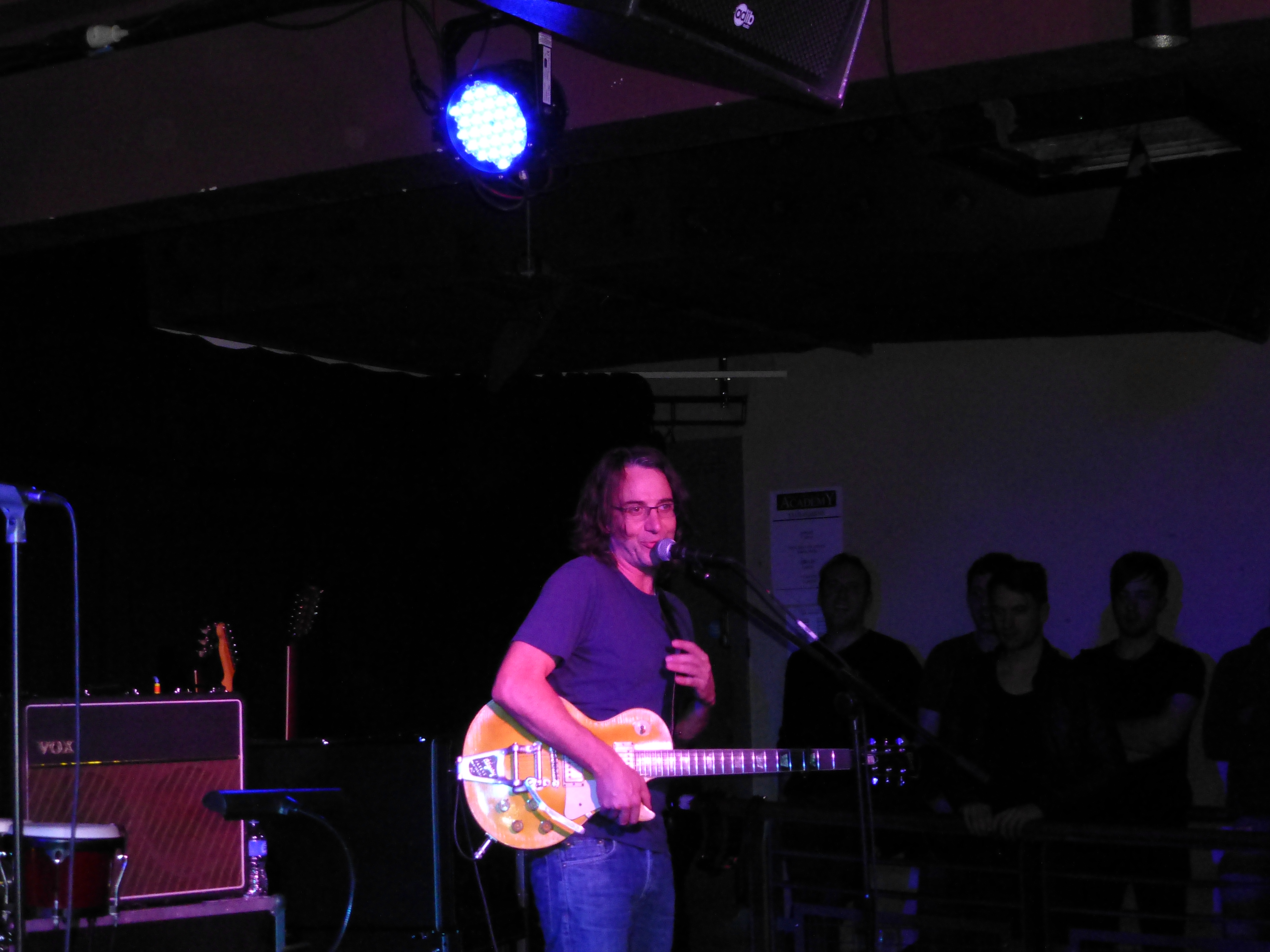
Gossard playing with Brad in Manchester, England in February 2013

In 1992, Gossard joined with members of the fellow Seattle band Satchel to form Brad. Brad released its debut album, Shame, in 1993, and have since released Interiors (1997), Welcome to Discovery Park (2002) and the compilation album, Brad vs Satchel (2005). The band's fourth studio album, titled Best Friends?, was released in August 2010 The fifth album, United We Stand, was released on April 24, 2012.

=== Mirror Ball ===
Gossard performed with other members of Pearl Jam on Neil Young's 1995 album, Mirror Ball, and subsequently took part in an eleven-date tour in Europe as part of Young's backing band. This tour proved very successful with Young's manager Elliot Roberts calling it "One of the greatest tours we ever had in our whole lives."

=== Bayleaf ===
On September 11, 2001, Gossard became the first member of Pearl Jam to go solo, releasing his first solo album, Bayleaf, through Sony Music Entertainment. The album features ten songs written over a span of four to five years. On Bayleaf, Gossard showed himself as being a talented multi-instrumentalist, contributing drums and piano work, as well as vocals, guitar and bass. The album's songs feature a mellow sound influenced by Frank Black, Rufus Wainwright, and The Rolling Stones. Greg Prato of Allmusic said, "While not as strong as his output with Brad, Bayleaf still has its moments."

=== Moonlander ===
Gossard released a follow-up to Bayleaf entitled Moonlander. Several songs have been made available as digital downloads via Pearl Jam's official website in the weeks since September 17, 2008, each for US$0.99. The songs feature a sound influenced by folk music and country music, particularly from singer-songwriter Hank Williams. The tracks "Both Live", "Your Flames", and "Beyond Measure" feature NW based musicians Hans Teuber, Pete Droge, Regan Hagar, Ari Joshua, and others.

=== Painted Shield ===
Unable to tour with Pearl Jam because of the COVID-19 pandemic, Gossard set to work on finishing the debut album of Painted Shield, his side project with singer-songwriter Mason Jennings which they have been working on since 2014. The album also features Josh Freese and Matt Chamberlain on drums, Brittany Davis on keyboard, and additional guitar contributions by Mike McCready. The album's release was originally scheduled for November 27, 2020 but pandemic-related production delays pushed the release to March 19, 2021.

=== Record label and studio owner ===
Gossard formed the record label Loosegroove Records with fellow Brad member Regan Hagar as a subsidiary of Sony in 1994, becoming independent in 1996. Loosegroove signed many up and coming artists from various musical genres, especially rock and hip hop. Significantly, Gossard signed Queens of the Stone Age to Loosegroove, releasing the band's debut album, Queens of the Stone Age, in 1998. Loosegroove Records closed in 2000. In 2020, Gossard and Hagar resurrected Loosegroove and released an album by Gossard's side project Painted Shield, as well as the album 1982 by Duff McKagen and Greg Gilmore's teenage punk band The Living.

As a producer, Gossard has worked with a variety of artists including many on his own record label. His most notable production roles have been for Satchel, Green Apple Quick Step, Weapon of Choice and Critters Buggin. During his time as owner of Loosegroove Records, Gossard opened his own recording studio, Studio Litho, in Seattle. Most of Gossard's production work was based in this studio, which still operates today, with Gossard as the owner. Many high-profile artists have recorded in Studio Litho, including Soundgarden, Screaming Trees, Dave Matthews Band, and Deftones, as well as both Brad and Pearl Jam.

== Other work ==
Gossard had a brief acting cameo in the 1992 movie, Singles, along with Jeff Ament and Eddie Vedder of Pearl Jam. He appeared as himself, playing guitar in lead actor Matt Dillon's backing band, Citizen Dick.

Gossard has been active in environmental pursuits, and has been an advocate of Pearl Jam's carbon neutral policy, offsetting the band's environmental impact. He has also extended his conservationist ideals and serves as a member of the board of directors at the Wild Salmon Center, an international conservation organization based in Portland, Oregon.

As an artist and painter, Gossard's work can be found on many Pearl Jam releases, especially material distributed through Pearl Jam's fan club.

== Musical style and influences ==
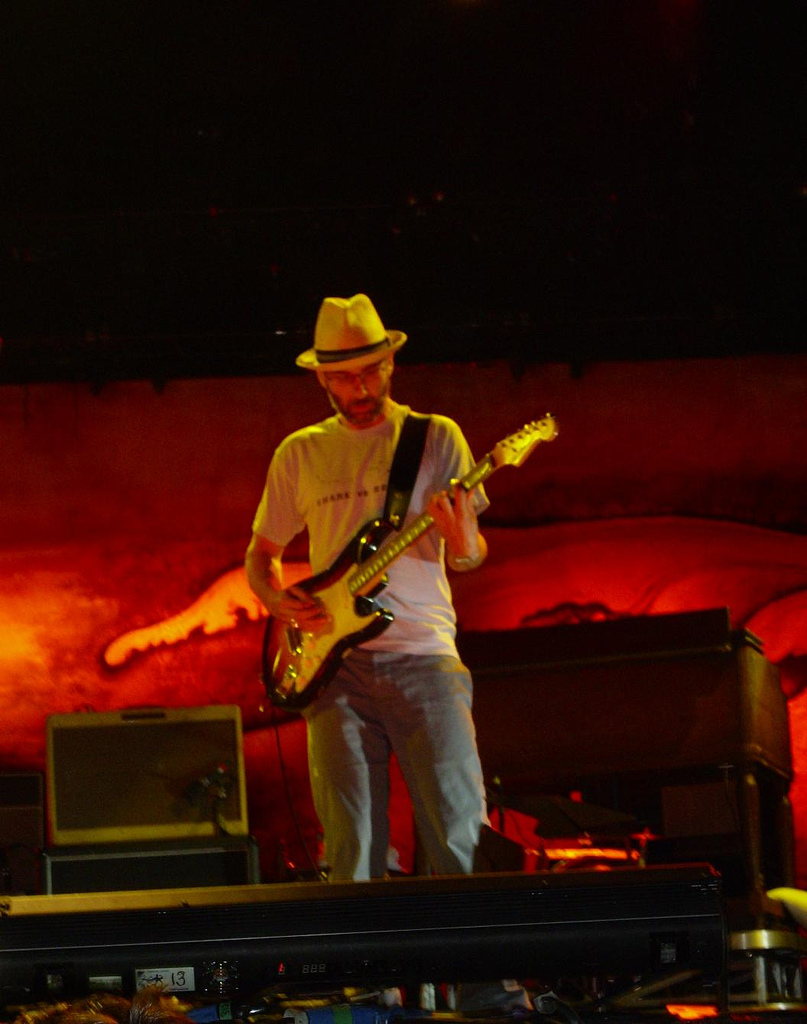
Gossard on stage with Pearl Jam in Madrid, Spain, in September 2006

Gossard is known for his hard rhythm style of playing, and his sense of beat and groove. Gossard has cited Jimmy Page and Led Zeppelin as a major influence on his style and rhythmic approach on guitar. Gossard's main instrument is a Gibson Les Paul equipped with a Bigsby vibrato system. He once said of himself: "I like rhythmic things that butt up against each other in a cool kind of way." Vedder has been quoted as saying that it is extremely difficult to collaborate with Gossard, as he outright refuses to work on anything remotely like anything he's done before. When the band started, Gossard and McCready were clearly designated as rhythm and lead guitarists, respectively. The dynamic began to change when Vedder started to play more rhythm guitar during the Vitalogy era. McCready said in 2006, "Even though there are three guitars, I think there's maybe more room now. Stone will pull back and play a two-note line and Ed will do a power chord thing, and I fit into all that."

As a songwriter, the formation of Pearl Jam led to Gossard's music becoming the basis for many of the band's early songs. Eight of the eleven tracks on Pearl Jam's debut album, Ten, were musically written or co-written by Gossard, including hits "Alive", "Even Flow", and "Black". He has since made less of a solo contribution to the band's work, instead becoming part of the collaborative efforts; however, he was credited as being behind the relatively more recent hits "Do the Evolution" and "Life Wasted" (from Pearl Jam). His songwriting contributions to Pearl Jam have not been limited to music with Gossard writing lyrics on the Yield song "All Those Yesterdays"; "Strangest Tribe" (from the 1999 fan club Christmas single); the Binaural songs "Thin Air", "Of the Girl", and "Rival"; and the Lost Dogs songs "Don't Gimme No Lip" and "Fatal". As well as guitar contributions, Gossard has also played mellotron, bass guitar and resonator guitar as well as often providing backing vocals. He was even given lead vocal duties for two of the Pearl Jam songs he had written both musically and lyrically: "Mankind" and "Don't Gimme No Lip".

== Recognition ==
In a review of Pearl Jam's 2006 self-titled album, Rolling Stone editor David Fricke mentioned that both Gossard and Pearl Jam lead guitarist Mike McCready were erroneously excluded from the publication's 2003 feature "The 100 Greatest Guitarists of All Time". In February 2007, Gossard and McCready were included together by Rolling Stone in its list of "The Top 20 New Guitar Gods" under the title of "four-armed monster." In 2023, McCready and Gossard were both included in Rolling Stone's "The 250 Greatest Guitarists of All Time" list at #124.

== Personal life ==
Gossard is also an avid reader and has cited Haruki Murakami as his favorite author.

Gossard was married to Elizabeth Weber from March 6, 2007 to May 25, 2011. They had one daughter together, born in 2007. On October 1, 2011, Gossard married Vivien Wang. Gossard and Wang have three daughters.

== Discography ==
=== Green River ===
Year	Title	Label	Track(s)
1985	Come on Down	Homestead	All
1986	Deep Six	C/Z	"10,000 Things" and "Your Own Best Friend"
1987	Dry As a Bone	Sub Pop	All
1988	Motor City Madness	Glitterhouse	"Searchin' (Good Things Come)"
1988	Rehab Doll	Sub Pop	All
1988	Sub Pop 200	Sub Pop	"Hangin' Tree"
1989	This House is Not a Motel	Glitterhouse	"Swallow My Pride"
1989	Sub Pop Rock City	Glitterhouse	"Hangin' Tree"
1989	Another Pyrrhic Victory: The Only Compilation of Dead Seattle God Bands	C/Z	"Bazaar" and "Away in Manger"
1990	Endangered Species	Glitterhouse	"Ain't Nothing to Do"
1990	Dry As a Bone/Rehab Doll	Sub Pop	All
1992	Afternoon Delight: Love Songs from Sub Pop	Sub Pop	"Baby Takes"
1996	Hype!: The Motion Picture Soundtrack	Sub Pop	"Swallow My Pride" (1987 demo)
2000	Wild and Wooly: The Northwest Rock Collection	Sub Pop	"This Town"
2006	Sleepless in Seattle: The Birth of Grunge	Livewire	"Come on Down"

=== Mother Love Bone ===
Year	Title	Label	Track(s)
1989	Shine	Stardog/Mercury	All
1990	Apple	Stardog/Mercury	All
1992	Singles: Original Motion Picture Soundtrack	Epic	"Chloe Dancer/Crown of Thorns"
1992	Mother Love Bone	Stardog/Mercury	All
1993	Thrash and Burn: The Metal Alternative	Sony Music Special Products	"Capricorn Sister"
1993	The Best of Grunge Rock	Priority	"Stardog Champion"
1995	Alterno-Daze: Natural 90s Selection	MCA	"Stardog Champion"
1997	Proud to Be Loud	Debutante	"Bone China"
2001	Alternative Moments	Sony Music Media	"Chloe Dancer/Crown of Thorns"
2007	The Road Mix: Music from the Television Series One Tree Hill, Volume 3	Maverick	"Chloe Dancer/Crown of Thorns"

=== Temple of the Dog ===
Year	Title	Label
1991	Temple of the Dog	A&M

=== Brad ===
Year	Title	Label	Track(s)
1993	Shame	Epic	All
1994	Threesome: Music from the Motion Picture	Epic	"Buttercup"
1997	Interiors	Epic	All
1998	Chicago Cab: Soundtrack	Loosegroove	"Secret Girl"
2002	Welcome to Discovery Park	Redline	All
2005	Brad vs Satchel	The Establishment Store	All except "Looking Forward", "Peace and Quiet", "Takin' It Back", and "Who's Side Are You On?"
2010	Best Friends?	Monkey Wrench	All
2012	United We Stand	Razor & Tie Records	
2023	In the Moment that You're Born	Loosegroove	

=== Painted Shield ===
Year	Title	Label	Track(s)
2020	Painted Shield	Loosegroove	All
2022	Painted Shield 2	Loosegroove	All
2024	Painted Shield 3	Loosegroove	All

=== Solo ===
Year	Title	Label
2001	Bayleaf	Sony
2013	Moonlander	Monkeywrench Records

=== Singles ===
Year	Title	Album
2020	"Near"	non-album single

=== Contributions and collaborations ===
Year	Group	Title	Label	Track(s)
1995	Neil Young	Mirror Ball	Reprise	All
1996	Thermadore	Monkey on Rico	Holiday/Atlantic	Four songs, including "Pushing" and "Anton"
1996	Three Fish	Three Fish	Epic	"Strangers in My Head"
1998	Calm Down Juanita Tyler Willman, Kevin Guess, and R. Cole Peterson III Esq.	Calm Down Juanita	Echo Records	"Touchin' Myself"
2000	Josh Freese	The Notorious One Man Orgy	Kung Fu	"Men & Women"
2003	Mike McCready, Stone Gossard, Cole Peterson, and Chris Friel	Live from Nowhere Near You	Funkhead Music	"Powerless"
2004	Steve Turner	Searching for Melody	Roslyn	Some
2004	Critters Buggin	Stampede	Rope-a-dope	"Toad Garden"
2004	Jack Irons	Attention Dimension	Breaching Whale	"Water Song"
2004	Steve Turner	And His Bad Ideas	Roslyn	Some
2005	Meganut	That Would Be Dope	Unknown	"Satisfaction" and "Rockbottom"
2009	Josh Freese	Since 1972	Outerscope	"Who Am I to Say, Really?"
2011	Caspar Babypants	Sing Along!		"Mister Winter Bee", "I Wanna Be a Snowman" and "Helicopter" plays Bongos
2023	Iggy Pop	Every Loser	Gold Tooth, Atlantic	"All the Way Down"
