= Regan Hagar =

American drummer

Regan Hagar is an American musician. Primarily a drummer, he also plays keyboard and guitar on occasion.

He was the drummer of the rock band Malfunkshun from 1980 to 1988, featuring Andrew Wood of Mother Love Bone on vocals and Kevin Wood on guitar. He had previously been in the band Maggot Brains, but joined Malfunkshun when their drummer, David Hunt, quit the band after the first show. Hagar has also performed in Satchel with Shawn Smith, and in Brad with Smith and Stone Gossard (from Pearl Jam and formerly Mother Love Bone).

== Early life ==
Regan Hagar became involved with music in Commodore Junior High School on Bainbridge Island, Washington, where he played the snare drum. Hagar met future Malfunkshun band-mate Andrew Wood there, when Hagar was in eighth grade and Wood was in seventh grade. He got into punk and began playing a full drum kit in high school and played for Maggot Brains. When he was fourteen years old, he and Andrew Wood became friends.

Hagar created his first album cover design at fifteen for World Full of Hate from The Fartz, a punk Seattle band whose lineup included Duff McKagan on drums prior to McKagan being in the LA glam rock band Guns N' Roses. Also in high school, he designed T-shirts and posters for bands with Andrew Wood. He is a self-taught graphic artist.

== Career ==
=== Malfunkshun ===
Andrew Wood asked him to join Malfunkshun after seeing Hagar working at the Showbox Theatre. Hagar worked hanging flyers and taking tickets for Showbox Theatre in exchange for free tickets to go to shows. Malfunkshun's three members (Kevin Wood, Andrew Wood, and Hagar) all used stage names and wore white make-up, similar to the members of the band Kiss. Hagar chose the name Thundarr because of Thor the Norse thunder god, and how drums relate to thunder.

Malfunkshun dissolved in 1988 to become Lords of the Wasteland, which featured Stone Gossard and Jeff Ament in their lineup, with Andrew Wood and Regan Hagar. Hagar was replaced by Greg Gilmore on drums as the band transitioned into Mother Love Bone. Hagar says that he was actually happy that Gilmore took his place in the band, because he had a lot of respect for Gilmore. In 2006 Regan Hagar recorded an album as From The North with Shawn Smith, Kevin Wood, and Cory Kane. This was a music project that used new music alongside lyrics left by Andrew Wood after his death. Regan left the band in 2011.

=== Brad ===
Regan Hagar was the drummer for the band Brad, which was active between 1992 until Shawn Smith's death in 2019. The band has released six albums. Although Stone Gossard and Shawn Smith usually wrote the songs, Hagar made contributions such as "Tea Bag", which was released on their 2012 album United We Stand. The song was written and recorded at an earlier date. Hagar was also a member of the Brad offshoot band, Satchel, which has since refolded back into Brad.

=== The Little Ships ===
Based in Seattle, US and Stratford-upon-Avon, England, Regan joined the transatlantic band in early 2015. Their debut album, Alone Together, was released in the summer of 2016.

== Personal life ==
In 1994, Hagar and Gossard started the independent label Loosegroove Records. During the 1990s, the label released music by bands such as Malfunkshun, Weapon of Choice, Devilhead, Ponga, Queens of the Stone Age, and Brad. The label closed in 2000 and its catalog was sold to Lakeshore Entertainment, although Hagar and Gossard resurrected the Loosegroove name in 2020.

Hagar also works as a freelance graphic designer and has worked on many album's artwork. He took up graphic design to help support his family, since being a musician was not very profitable. Initially his career as a graphic designer was overlooked because people thought of him as a musician. He created the album art for Eddie Vedder's ukulele album "Ukulele Songs", which was released in 2011. Hagar became involved with Vedder's band Pearl Jam's art design after he designed Lance Mercer's book 5x1—Pearl Jam Through the Eye of Lance Mercer.
