= 9.11.2011 Toronto, Canada =

Live album by Pearl Jam
- Released: November 10, 2011
- Recorded: September 11, 2011, Air Canada Centre, Toronto, Canada
- Genre: Alternative rock; grunge
- Length: 145:42
- Language: English
- Label: Monkeywrench

Pearl Jam albums chronology
Pearl Jam Twenty (2011)	9.11.2011 Toronto, Canada (2011)	Lightning Bolt (2013)

9.11.2011 Toronto, Canada is a 2011 live album released by American alternative rock band, Pearl Jam. The album was released exclusively as a free digital download through Google Play Music on November 10 in anticipation of the official launch of said site on November 16.

== Overview ==
The album was recorded during Pearl Jam's September 11, 2011, show in Toronto, Ontario at the Air Canada Centre. The concert commemorated the tenth anniversary of the 9/11 attacks on the World Trade Center and The Pentagon. The band was also in Toronto, as their Cameron Crowe-directed documentary, Pearl Jam Twenty, had premiered at the Toronto International Film Festival the night before. This was the first of two shows played in Toronto on consecutive days during the Pearl Jam Twenty Tour. The opening act for the September 11 and 12 shows was Mudhoney. The concert also marked the first time that Pearl Jam had played Toronto since August 21, 2009.

== Track listing ==
All tracks are written by Eddie Vedder, except where noted.

9.11.2011 Toronto, Canada track listing
No.	Title	Writer(s)	Length
1.	"Long Road"		5:37
2.	"Do the Evolution"	Stone Gossard & Vedder	3:39
3.	"Once"	Gossard & Vedder	3:18
4.	"Got Some"	Jeff Ament & Vedder	4:25
5.	"Faithfull"	Mike McCready & Vedder	4:57
6.	"Nothing as It Seems"	Ament	5:32
7.	"Elderly Woman Behind the Counter in a Small Town"	Dave Abbruzzese, Ament, Gossard, McCready & Vedder	7:08
8.	"Setting Forth" (Eddie Vedder cover)		1:27
9.	"Not for You" (segues into "Modern Girl", a Sleater-Kinney cover)	Abbruzzese, Ament, Gossard, McCready & Vedder / Carrie Brownstein, Corin Tucker & Janet Weiss	6:30
10.	"Given to Fly"	McCready & Vedder	3:59
11.	"Just Breathe"		3:58
12.	"Off He Goes"		5:31
13.	"Daughter" (segues into "It's OK", a Dead Moon cover)	Abbruzzese, Ament, Gossard, McCready & Vedder / Fred Cole	6:42
14.	"Grievance"		3:14
15.	"Down"	Gossard, McCready & Vedder	3:04
16.	"Unthought Known"		4:01
17.	"The Fixer"	Matt Cameron, Gossard, McCready & Vedder	3:18
18.	"Porch"		7:21
19.	"Encore Break 1"		3:30
20.	"Nothingman"	Ament & Vedder	4:25
21.	"Better Man" (segues into "Save It for Later", an English Beat cover)	Vedder / Roger Charlery, Andy Cox, Everett Morton, David Steele & Dave Wakeling	8:20
22.	"Leatherman"		2:32
23.	"Black"	Gossard & Vedder	7:48
24.	"Rearviewmirror"	Abbruzzese, Ament, Gossard, McCready, Vedder	7:01
25.	"Encore Break 2"		0:37
26.	"Chloe Dancer" (Mother Love Bone cover)	Ament, Bruce Fairweather, Greg Gilmore, Gossard & Andrew Wood	2:06
27.	"Crown of Thorns" (Mother Love Bone cover)	Ament, Fairweather, Gilmore, Gossard & Wood	5:53
28.	"Alive"	Gossard & Vedder	6:48
29.	"Rockin' in the Free World" (featuring Neil Young)	Neil Young	12:44
Total length:			145:42

== Personnel ==
Pearl Jam

- Eddie Vedder – lead vocals, rhythm guitar
- Jeff Ament – bass guitar
- Matt Cameron – drums
- Stone Gossard – rhythm guitar
- Mike McCready – lead guitar

Additional musicians

- Boom Gaspar – Hammond B-3, keyboards
- Neil Young – vocals and guitar on "Rockin' in the Free World"
