= Mother Love Bone (album) =

Compilation album by Mother Love Bone
- Released: September 22, 1992
- Recorded: November 1988 – November 1989
- Studio: London Bridge Studios, Seattle, Washington and The Plant, Sausalito, California
- Genre: Alternative rock; grunge; hard rock
- Length: 84:35
- Label: Stardog/Mercury
- Producer: Bruce Calder, Terry Date, Mark Dearnley, Mother Love Bone

Mother Love Bone chronology
| Apple (1990) | Mother Love Bone (1992) | The Love Bone Earth Affair (1993) |

Singles from Mother Love Bone
- 1. "Stardog Champion" Released: 1992; 2. "Capricorn Sister" Released: 1992

Professional ratings
Review scores
| Source | Rating |
|---|---|
| AllMusic | 4.5/5 stars |
| Entertainment Weekly | B+ |
| Kerrang! | 4/5 stars |
| Q | 3/5 stars |

Mother Love Bone (also known as Stardog Champion) is a compilation album by the American rock band Mother Love Bone. It was released on September 22, 1992, through Stardog/Mercury Records.

== Overview ==
The album contains material from the EP Shine (1989) and the album Apple (1990). It was released by PolyGram subsidiary Stardog/Mercury Records after the band dissolved due to the death of vocalist Andrew Wood. The album charted at number 77 on the Billboard 200 album chart in 1992. Ira Robbins of Entertainment Weekly said, "Mother Love Bone—the band's total output—suggests a young, hungry Aerosmith hooked on Led Zeppelin."

== Song meanings ==
On Thursday, March 15, 1990 (just 26 hours before Andy Wood's overdose), RIP writer Michael Browning and Andrew Wood conducted what might be his last interview. Mother Love Bone were scheduled to be a part of a RIP magazine-sponsored three-band tour supporting Apple, which was ready to be released. He describes many of the song meanings:

Andy Wood: "Stardog Champion" is a kinda...fake, kinda patriotic rock anthem of sorts. That's gonna be the first single and video. When I wrote "Holy Roller," I didn't even know what a holy roller was. I just thought it was a cool term. Actually, I was thinking of a Paul McCartney and Wings song "Let Me Roll It." I don't know why it made me think of holy rollers. "Captain High-Top" is just a total rock propaganda kinda thing. I kinda see "Heartshine" as our "Achilles' Last Stand" of the album. It's long and real powerful. I was kinda depressed about leaving Malfunkshun for a long time. Still am, kinda. I feel like, you know, I left them stranded. I've got a brother besides Kevin who, ah, is kinda insane in a way, and he makes the whole family worry about him, so "Heartshine" is a little about both of my brothers.

RIP: "Mr. Danny Boy" is obviously a slam on Danny Thomas.

A.W.: Yeah, I don't know why we decided to do such a mean thing to Danny.

RIP: But you did.

A.W.: That's right. No offense to Marlo. I still like her from ThatGirl [laughs].

RIP: "Come Bite the Apple," is there any significance to that?

A.W.: That's a meaningful song. It's a "Crown of Thorns" type of song. The lyrics are personal, whereas some of the songs have absolutely nothing to do with me. "Apple" and "Crown of Thorns" are probably mostly about me. It's kind of a synopsis of the whole past year. I'm lucky to be sitting here.

== Commercial performance ==
The album debuted at No. 77 on the Billboard 200 for chart dated October 10, 1992, selling 14,000 copies in the first week. The album has sold 410,000 copies in the United States as of September 2016.

== Track listing ==
Recorded for Apple:

All tracks are written by Jeff Ament, Bruce Fairweather, Greg Gilmore, Stone Gossard, and Andrew Wood.

| No. | Title | Length |
|---|---|---|
| 1. | "This Is Shangrila" | 3:41 |
| 2. | "Stardog Champion" | 4:58 |
| 3. | "Holy Roller" | 4:26 |
| 4. | "Bone China" | 3:45 |
| 5. | "Come Bite the Apple" | 5:25 |
| 6. | "Stargazer" | 4:49 |
| 7. | "Heartshine" | 4:35 |
| 8. | "Captain Hi-Top" | 3:05 |
| 9. | "Man of Golden Words" | 3:40 |
| 10. | "Capricorn Sister" (Apple version) | 4:17 |
| 11. | "Gentle Groove" | 4:02 |
| 12. | "Mr. Danny Boy" | 4:49 |
| 13. | "Crown of Thorns" | 6:21 |

Recorded for Shine:

| No. | Title | Length |
|---|---|---|
| 14. | "Thru Fade Away" | 3:40 |
| 15. | "Mindshaker Meltdown" | 3:47 |
| 16. | "Half Ass Monkey Boy" | 3:18 |
| 17. | "Chloe Dancer/Crown of Thorns" | 8:40 |

=== Bonus disc ===
| No. | Title | Length |
|---|---|---|
| 1. | "Capricorn Sister" (Shine version) | 3:54 |
| 2. | "Lady Godiva Blues" | 3:23 |

== Personnel ==
Mother Love Bone

- Andrew Wood – lead vocals, piano
- Bruce Fairweather – lead guitar
- Stone Gossard – rhythm guitar
- Jeff Ament – bass
- Greg Gilmore – drums

Production

- Michael Bays – art direction
- James Bland – inside photos
- Greg Calbi, Bob Ludwig – mastering
- Bruce Calder – production on "Stargazer"
- Terry Date, Mother Love Bone – production
- Mark Dearnley – production, mixing
- Tim Palmer – mixing

== Chart positions ==
| Chart (1993) | Position |
|---|---|
| US Billboard 200 | 77 |
