= Chloe Dancer/Crown of Thorns =

1990 song by Mother Love Bone

Song by Mother Love Bone

from the album Shine
- Released: March 20, 1989
- Recorded: November 1988 at London Bridge Studios, Seattle, Washington
- Genre: Grunge
- Length: 8:20
- Label: Stardog/Mercury
- Songwriters: Jeff Ament, Bruce Fairweather, Greg Gilmore, Stone Gossard, Andrew Wood
- Producers: Mark Dearnley, Mother Love Bone

"Crown of Thorns"

Song by Mother Love Bone

from the album Apple
- Released: July 19, 1990
- Recorded: January 1989 at London Bridge Studios, Seattle, Washington
- Genre: Grunge
- Length: 6:18
- Label: Stardog/Mercury
- Songwriters: Jeff Ament, Bruce Fairweather, Greg Gilmore, Stone Gossard, Andrew Wood
- Producers: Mark Dearnley, Mother Love Bone

"Chloe Dancer/Crown of Thorns" is a song by the Seattle rock band Mother Love Bone. The song is the fourth track on the band's debut EP, Shine (1989). "Chloe Dancer/Crown of Thorns" is two songs sequenced together. "Crown of Thorns" is found by itself on the band's sole studio album, Apple (1990). "Chloe Dancer" is not available as a stand-alone track.

== Reception ==
"Chloe Dancer/Crown of Thorns" is critically acclaimed, and considered one of Mother Love Bone's best songs. Jason Josephes of Pitchfork described it as "one astoundingly great song." Steven Rosen of The Denver Post referred to the song as "trancelike epic." Spencer Patterson of the Las Vegas Sun comments that the song is "fantastically melancholy." Essi Berelian of the Rough Music Guide writes that it is "beautifully swirling." The Salt Lake Tribune found the song "eerie" and praised Mother Love Bone vocalist Andrew Wood's "powerful and emotive voice." The song was included by Rolling Stone in their list of "The Fifty Best Songs Over Seven Minutes Long".

The song was featured in director Cameron Crowe's 1989 film, Say Anything..., but it was not included on the film's soundtrack. Crowe again used the song in his 1992 film, Singles, and this time used it on the soundtrack. It was also featured in the One Tree Hill episode "Pictures of You" in 2007 and can be found on The Road Mix: Music from the Television Series One Tree Hill, Volume 3.

== Cover versions ==
Pearl Jam, which includes former Mother Love Bone members Jeff Ament and Stone Gossard, has performed the song "Crown of Thorns" in concert many times, starting with the 10/22/00 show in Las Vegas, which was the tenth anniversary of Pearl Jam's first show. Video of this performance appears on the Pearl Jam documentary Pearl Jam Twenty and this version of the song appears on its soundtrack. The song is also included on the 2003 concert DVD Live at the Garden, in which Pearl Jam vocalist Eddie Vedder, in tribute to the late Wood, said, "I think Jeff and Stone will back me up on this, Andy would have loved it here." Two performances of the song by Pearl Jam from 2005 and 2006 were issued on the Live at the Gorge 05/06 box set. The two performances took place on September 1, 2005 and July 23, 2006. The band still play the song in live performances as of 2023. "Chloe Dancer" has also been performed by Pearl Jam, always preceding "Crown of Thorns".

In April 2011, Kevin Wood (Andrew Wood's brother) teamed up with hard rock band Lace Weeper to record Mother Love Bone's "Crown of Thorns" as a tribute to Wood on the 21st anniversary of his death. The single was released on Kevin's Wammybox Records.

Shawn Smith has also on multiple occasions covered the song. In one instance, Smith covered the song alongside the band Sweet Water, also accompanied by the Seattle Symphony Orchestra.

On July 7, 2015 at a New York City show, Slipknot and Stone Sour frontman Corey Taylor performed a cover of "Chloe Dancer".

On May 20, 2023, Billy Strings performed a cover of "Crown of Thorns" at Cal Coast Credit Union Amphitheater in San Diego.

On August 27, 2020, Charlie Benante of Anthrax, Mark Osegueda of Death Angel, and Mark Menghi of Metal Allegiance recorded a cover and posted a video of the song on Benante's YouTube channel

== Accolades ==
Publication	Country	Accolade	Year	Rank
Rolling Stone	United States	"The Fifty Best Songs Over Seven Minutes Long"	2007	*

* denotes an unordered list
