= Pearl Jam Twenty Tour =

2011 concert tour by Pearl Jam

- Tour by Pearl Jam
- Location: North America; Latin America
- Associated album: Pearl Jam Twenty
- Start date: September 3, 2011
- End date: November 24, 2011
- Legs: 2
- No. of shows: 12 in North America; 10 in Latin America; 22 in total

Pearl Jam concert chronology
- Backspacer Tour (2009–10); Pearl Jam Twenty Tour (2011); 2012 Tour (2012)

The Pearl Jam Twenty Tour (also known as the PJ20 Tour) was a concert tour by the American rock band Pearl Jam to celebrate the band's 20th anniversary. The tour consisted of a two-day festival at the Alpine Valley Music Theatre in East Troy, Wisconsin on the Labor Day weekend, and was followed by ten shows in Canada, ending with a show at the Pacific Coliseum, Vancouver. The festival dates had support from Queens of the Stone Age, Mudhoney, Liam Finn, John Doe and The Strokes. Due to high ticket demand for pre-sale tickets, the website had to be taken offline.

On July 11, the band announced an additional nine dates in Latin America, scheduled for November. This was the second time that the band had toured Latin America, after their 2005 tour and included a show in San José, Costa Rica. On August 19, a second date was added in São Paulo. American punk band X were announced as the opening band for the Latin American shows.

== History ==
The opening show at Alpine Valley featured songs by Mother Love Bone and Temple of the Dog with Chris Cornell on vocals. This was then repeated for the second show. During the first show at the Air Canada Centre in Toronto, the band were joined onstage by Neil Young during their performance of "Rockin' in the Free World". The show was later released exclusively as a free digital download through Google Music on November 10 in celebration of the upcoming, official launch of that site on November 16.

== Opening acts ==
- Mudhoney — North America (excluding Costa Rica and Mexico)
- X — South America, Costa Rica and Mexico

== Tour dates ==
Date	City	Country	Venue
North America
September 3, 2011	East Troy	United States	Alpine Valley Music Theatre
September 4, 2011	East Troy	United States	Alpine Valley Music Theatre
September 7, 2011	Montreal	Canada	Bell Centre
September 11, 2011	Toronto	Canada	Air Canada Centre
September 12, 2011	Toronto	Canada	Air Canada Centre
September 14, 2011	Ottawa	Canada	Scotiabank Place
September 15, 2011	Hamilton	Canada	Copps Coliseum
September 17, 2011	Winnipeg	Canada	MTS Centre
September 19, 2011	Saskatoon	Canada	Credit Union Centre
September 21, 2011	Calgary	Canada	Scotiabank Saddledome
September 23, 2011	Edmonton	Canada	Rexall Place
September 25, 2011	Vancouver	Canada	Pacific Coliseum
Latin America
November 3, 2011	São Paulo	Brazil	Estádio do Morumbi
November 4, 2011	São Paulo	Brazil	Estádio do Morumbi
November 6, 2011	Rio de Janeiro	Brazil	Praça da Apoteose
November 9, 2011	Curitiba	Brazil	Estádio Vila Capanema
November 11, 2011	Porto Alegre	Brazil	Estádio Passo D'Areia
November 13, 2011	La Plata	Argentina	Estadio Ciudad de La Plata
November 16, 2011	Santiago	Chile	Estadio Monumental David Arellano
November 18, 2011	Lima	Peru	Estadio Universidad San Marcos
November 20, 2011	San José	Costa Rica	Estadio Nacional San Jose
November 24, 2011	Mexico City	Mexico	Foro Sol

== Band members ==
Pearl Jam

- Jeff Ament – bass guitar
- Stone Gossard – rhythm guitar
- Mike McCready – lead guitar
- Eddie Vedder – lead vocals, guitar
- Matt Cameron – drums

Additional musicians

- Boom Gaspar – Hammond B3 and keyboards

== Gallery ==
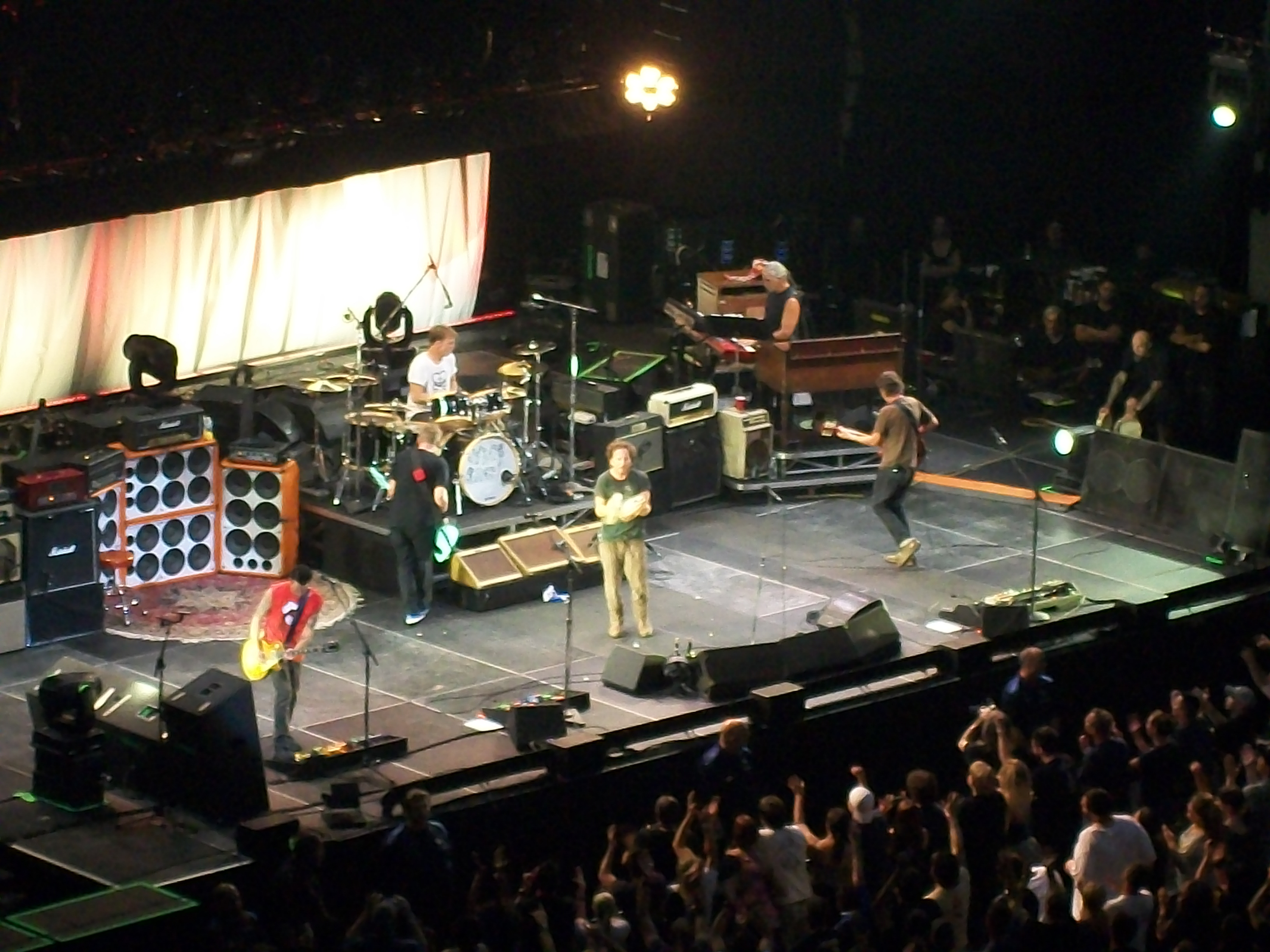
Pearl Jam at the Air Canada Centre, Toronto, Canada on September 11, 2011

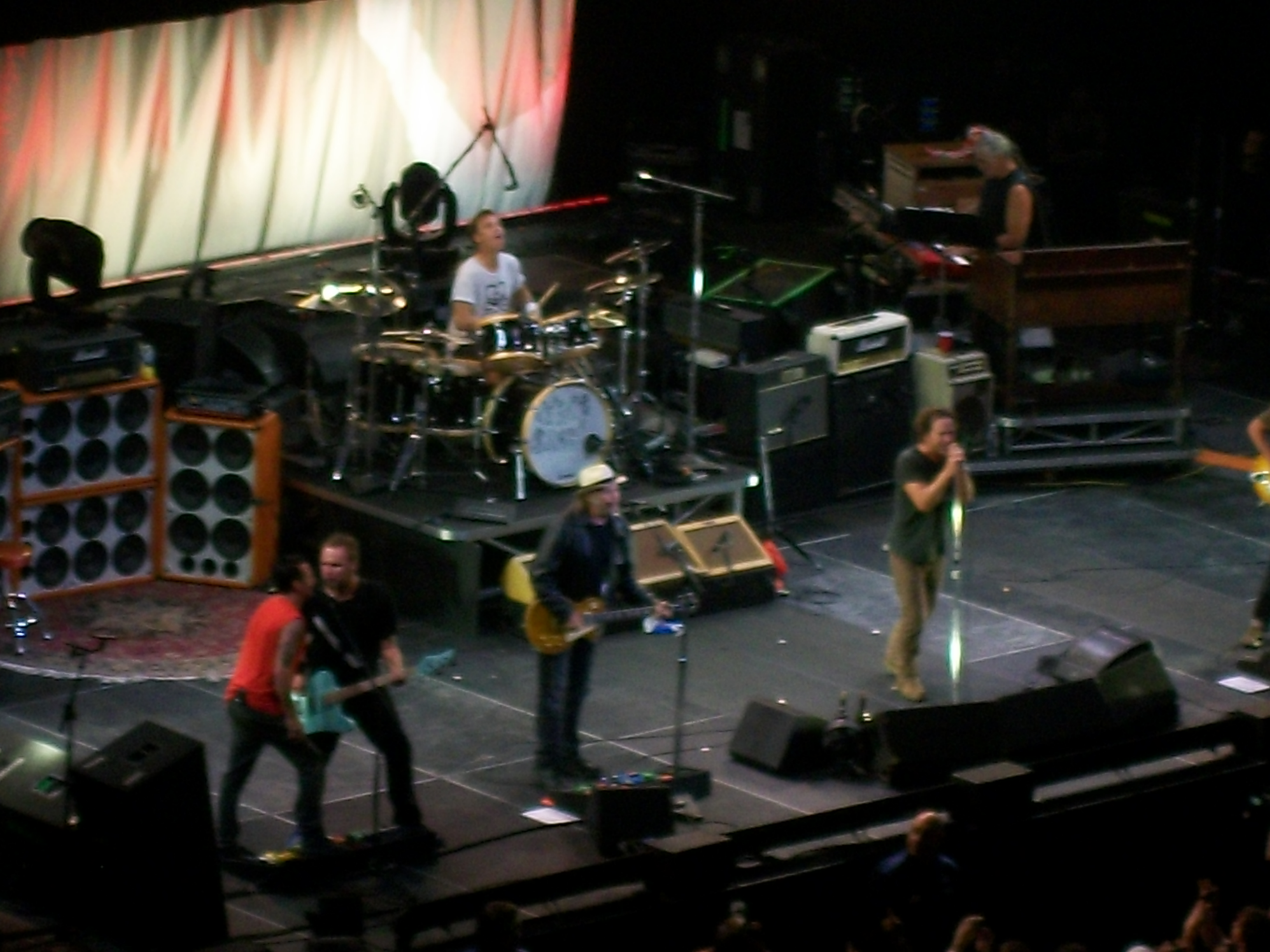
Pearl Jam with Neil Young (centre) at the Air Canada Centre, Toronto, Canada on September 11, 2011

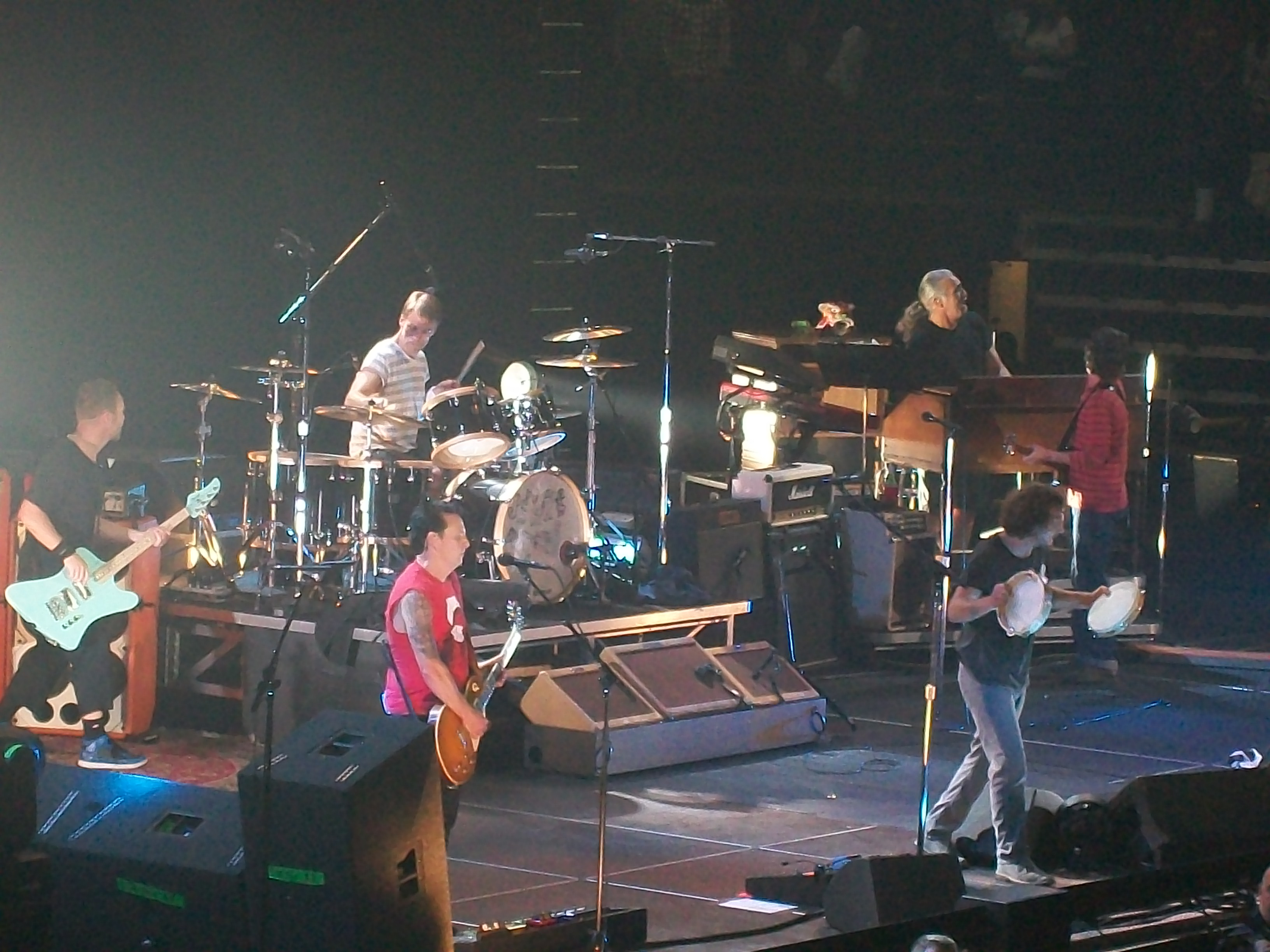
Pearl Jam at the Copps Coliseum, Hamilton, Canada on September 15, 2011

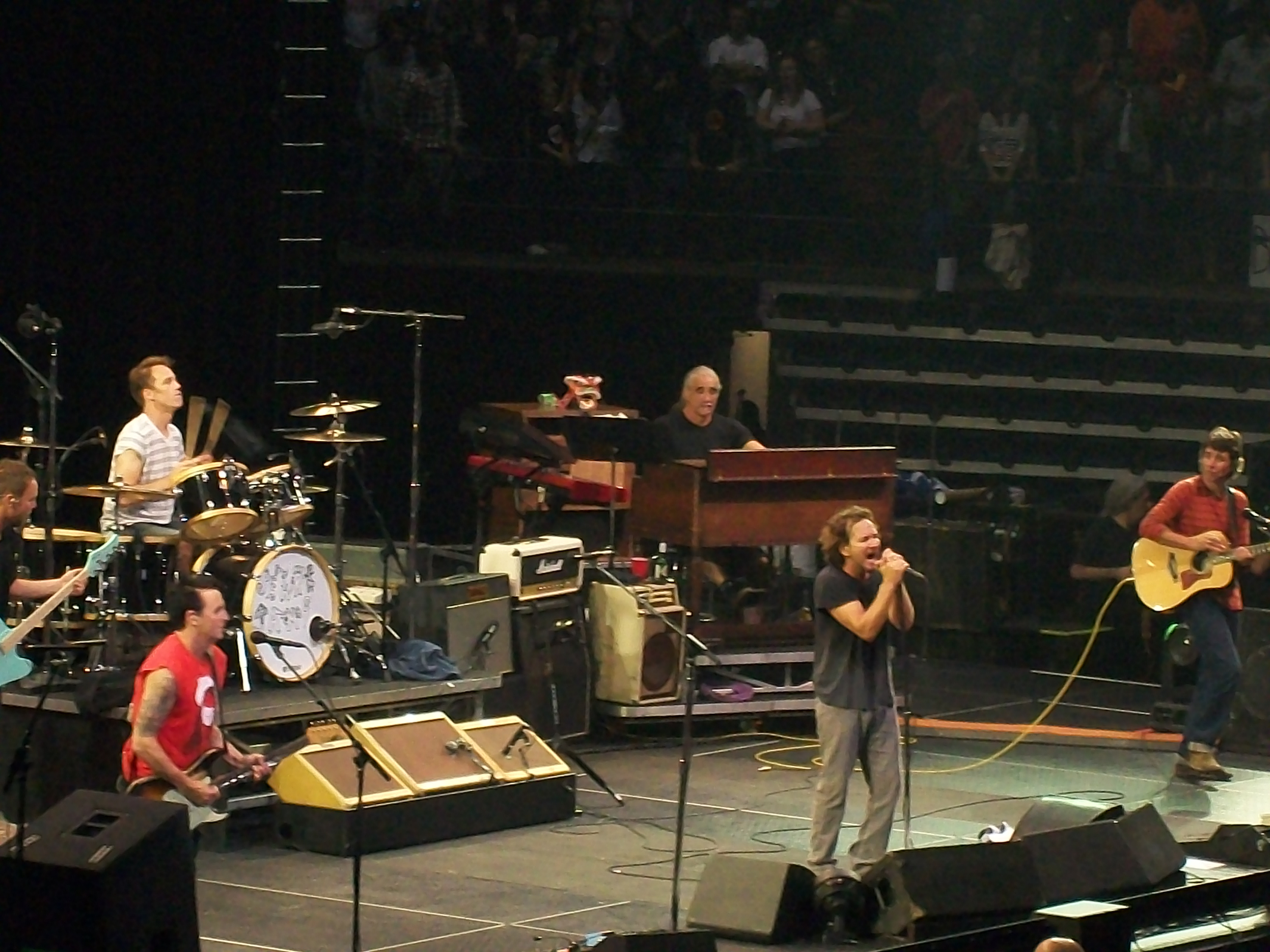
Pearl Jam at the Copps Coliseum, Hamilton, Canada on September 15, 2011
