= Shine (Mother Love Bone EP) =

EP by Mother Love Bone
- Released: March 6, 1989
- Recorded: November 1988 at London Bridge Studios, Seattle, Washington
- Genre: Alternative rock, grunge, hard rock
- Length: 19:05
- Label: Stardog/Mercury
- Producer: Mark Dearnley

Mother Love Bone chronology
Shine (1989)	Apple (1990)

Professional ratings
Review scores
Source	Rating
Allmusic	3/5 stars

Shine is the debut EP by the American rock band Mother Love Bone. It was released on March 6, 1989, through Stardog/Mercury Records. This was the only compilation of recordings to be released during singer Andrew Wood's lifetime.

== Overview ==
The EP was recorded in November 1988 at London Bridge Studios in Seattle, Washington with producer Mark Dearnley. Dearnley also mixed the album, Charles Peterson photographed the cover art. With the exception of the over eight minute long "Chloe Dancer/Crown of Thorns", a majority of the songs here draw upon the band's rawer side. Vocalist Andrew Wood's dreamy lyrics are sung in a tenor heavily reminiscent of Led Zeppelin frontman Robert Plant. Mother Love Bone became the first of the new crop of Seattle bands to have a release on a major label. The record sold well and rapidly increased the hype surrounding the band. John Book of Allmusic said the "record contributed to the buzz about the Seattle music scene." This whole release was later reissued on the Mother Love Bone (also known as Stardog Champion) compilation album in 1992, with the exception of the hidden track "Zanzibar" which can only be found on this EP.

== Track listing ==
All lyrics are written by Andrew Wood; all music is composed by Jeff Ament, Bruce Fairweather, Greg Gilmore, Stone Gossard, and Wood

No.	Title	Length
1.	"Thru Fade Away"	3:40
2.	"Mindshaker Meltdown"	3:47
3.	"Half Ass Monkey Boy"	3:18
4.	"Chloe Dancer/Crown of Thorns"	8:32

CD bonus track

All lyrics are written by Wood; all music is composed by Ament, Fairweather, Gilmore, Gossard, and Wood

No.	Title	Length
5.	"Capricorn Sister^{[I]}"	5:59

I "Capricorn Sister" contains the hidden track "Zanzibar" at 4:07.

== Personnel ==
Mother Love Bone

- Andrew Wood – lead vocals, piano
- Bruce Fairweather – lead guitar
- Stone Gossard – rhythm guitar
- Jeff Ament – bass
- Greg Gilmore – drums

Production

- Michael Bays – art direction
- Mark Dearnley – production, mixing
- Klotz – design
- Charles Peterson – photography
