= The Love Bone Earth Affair =

Video by Mother Love Bone
- Released: 1993
- Recorded: 1988–1990
- Genre: Grunge, alternative rock, hard rock
- Length: 35 minutes
- Label: PolyGram
- Director: Troy Smith

Mother Love Bone chronology
Mother Love Bone (1992)	The Love Bone Earth Affair (1993)

The Love Bone Earth Affair is a home video by the American rock band Mother Love Bone. It was released in 1993.

== Overview ==
The home video features never-before-seen footage of Mother Love Bone live in concert combined with previously unreleased interviews with frontman Andrew Wood, bassist Jeff Ament, and guitarist Stone Gossard. The documentary covers the band's formation and its eventual disbandment due to the death of Wood. Additionally, the videos for "Stardog Champion" and "Holy Roller" are included. The Love Bone Earth Affair was first released on VHS, with an official DVD version released on November 4, 2016, as part of the boxed set Mother Love Bone: On Earth as It Is – The Complete Works.

== Personnel ==
Mother Love Bone

- Andrew Wood – lead vocals
- Bruce Fairweather – lead guitar
- Stone Gossard – rhythm guitar
- Jeff Ament – bass
- Greg Gilmore – drums

Production

- James Bland, Lance Mercer – still photography
- Adolfo Doring – Videoprofile
- Troy Smith – direction
- Josh Taft – direction on "Stardog Champion" video, Videoprofile
- Tim Taylor – editor

== Chart positions ==
Chart (1993)	Position
US Top Music Videos	13
