= Pearl Jam Twenty (soundtrack) =

2011 album

Soundtrack album by Pearl Jam
- Released: September 19, 2011
- Recorded: 1990–2010
- Genres: Alternative rock; grunge
- Length: 128:06
- Label: Columbia

Pearl Jam chronology
Live on Ten Legs (2011)	Pearl Jam Twenty (2011)	9.11.2011 Toronto, Canada (2011)

Professional ratings
Aggregate scores
Source	Rating
Metacritic	78/100
Review scores
Source	Rating
AllMusic	3/5 stars
American Songwriter	4/5 stars
Chicago Tribune	3/4 stars
Classic Rock	3/5 stars
Consequence of Sound	4/5 stars
Kerrang!	4/5 stars
PopMatters	9/10
Rolling Stone	3.5/5 stars
Uncut	8/10

Pearl Jam Twenty (also known as PJ20) is a live compilation album by American alternative rock band Pearl Jam and is the soundtrack to the film of the same name. It was released on September 19, 2011 in Europe and September 20 in the United States.

== Track listing ==
All lyrics are written by Eddie Vedder; all songwriting credits adapted from the album's liner notes.

Disc one
No.	Title	Music	Length
1.	"Release" (live in Verona, Italy, September 16, 2006)	Vedder, Stone Gossard, Jeff Ament, Mike McCready, Dave Krusen	4:46
2.	"Alive" (Mookie Blaylock live in Seattle, WA, December 22, 1990)	Gossard	4:47
3.	"Garden" (live in Albani Bar Of Music, Winterthur, Switzerland, February 19, 1992)	Gossard, Ament	6:08
4.	"Why Go" (live in Hamburg, Germany, March 10, 1992)	Ament	3:22
5.	"Black" (MTV Unplugged in New York, NY, March 16, 1992)	Gossard	5:39
6.	"Blood" (live in Auckland, New Zealand, March 25, 1995)	Dave Abbruzzese, Ament, Gossard, McCready, Vedder	3:15
7.	"Last Exit" (live in Taipei, Taiwan, February 24, 1995)	Abbruzzese, Ament, Gossard, McCready, Vedder	2:46
8.	"Not for You" (live in Manila, Philippines, February 26, 1995)	Abbruzzese, Ament, Gossard, McCready, Vedder	6:19
9.	"Do the Evolution" (Monkeywrench Radio, Seattle, WA, January 31, 1998)	Gossard	3:42
10.	"Thumbing My Way" (take 2, Seattle, WA, September 6, 2002)	Vedder	4:22
11.	"Crown of Thorns" (live in Las Vegas, NV, October 22, 2000)	Ament, Gossard, Andrew Wood, Bruce Fairweather, Greg Gilmore	6:45
12.	"Let Me Sleep (Christmas Time)" (live in Verona, Italy, September 16, 2006)	McCready, Vedder	2:15
13.	"Walk with Me" (live with Neil Young, Mountain View, CA, October 23, 2010)	Young	4:10
14.	"Just Breathe" (live at 30 Rock, Studio 8H - Saturday Night Live in New York, NY March 13, 2010)	Vedder	3:39
Total length:			62:06

Disc two
No.	Title	Lyrics	Music	Length
1.	"Say Hello 2 Heaven" (Temple of the Dog demo, 1990)	Chris Cornell	Cornell	7:04
2.	"Times of Trouble" (Gossard, Ament, McCready and Cameron demo, 1990 (Note: Demo of the song "Footsteps".))	(Instrumental)	Gossard	4:13
3.	"Acoustic #1" (Vedder and Gossard demo, 1991)		Gossard	2:49
4.	"It Ain't Like That" (Alice in Chains cover, Mookie Blaylock demo, 1990)	(Instrumental)	Jerry Cantrell, Mike Star, Jeff Kinney	1:27
5.	"Need to Know" (Matt Cameron demo, 2007 (Note: Demo of the song "The Fixer".))	Matt Cameron	Cameron	1:52
6.	"Be Like Wind" (Mike McCready score, 2010)	(Instrumental)	McCready	1:53
7.	"Given to Fly" (Mike McCready acoustic instrumental, July 29, 2010)	(Instrumental)	McCready	2:42
8.	"Nothing as It Seems" (Jeff Ament Montana demo, 1999)	Ament	Ament	4:41
9.	"Nothing as It Seems" (live in Seattle, WA, October 22, 2001)	Ament	Ament	5:42
10.	"Indifference" (live in Bologna, Italy, September 14, 2006)		Abbruzzese, Ament, Gossard, McCready, Vedder	5:02
11.	"Of the Girl" (instrumental, 2000)	(Instrumental)	Gossard	5:06
12.	"Faithfull" (soundcheck in Pistoia, Italy, September 20, 2006)		McCready	4:26
13.	"Bu$hleaguer" (live in Uniondale, NY, April 30, 2003)	Vedder, Gossard	Gossard	4:49
14.	"Better Man" (live in New York, NY, May 21, 2010)		Vedder	6:49
15.	"Rearviewmirror" (live in Universal City, CA, October 1, 2009)		Abbruzzese, Ament, Gossard, McCready, Vedder	7:12
Total length:				66:00

== Personnel ==
All credits for Pearl Jam Twenty are adapted from the album's liner notes.

Pearl Jam

- Eddie Vedder – lead vocals (disc 1: all; disc 2: 3, 9–15); guitar (disc 1: 8, 10; disc 2: 14, 15)
- Stone Gossard – guitar (disc 1: all; disc 2: 1–4, 9–15)
- Jeff Ament – bass (disc 1: all; disc 2: 1, 2, 4, 8–15); vocals, guitar, strings (disc 2: 8)
- Mike McCready – guitar (disc 1: all; disc 2: 1, 2, 4, 6, 7, 9–15)
- Matt Cameron – drums (disk 1: 1, 10–14 ; disc 2: 1, 2, 5, 9–15); vocals, guitar, bass (disc 2: 5)
- Dave Krusen – drums (disc 1: 2; disc 2: 4)
- Dave Abbruzzese – drums (disc 1: 2–5)
- Jack Irons – drums (disc 1: 6–9)

Additional musicians

- Neil Young – vocals, guitar (disc 1: 13)
- Chris Cornell – vocals (disc 2: 1)

Production

- Pearl Jam – production
- Cameron Crowe – executive production
- Brett Eliason – mixing engineer
- Ed Brooke – mastering engineer
- Lance Mercer – photography
- Kerensa Wight – photography
- Karen Loria – photography

== Chart positions ==
Chart performance for Pearl Jam Twenty
Chart (2011)	Peak position
Australian Albums (ARIA)	14
Austrian Albums (Ö3 Austria)	48
Belgian Albums (Ultratop Flanders)	26
Belgian Albums (Ultratop Wallonia)	33
Croatian International Albums (HDU)	18
Czech Albums (ČNS IFPI)	45
Danish Albums (Hitlisten)	37
Dutch Albums (Album Top 100)	12
French Albums (SNEP)	140
German Albums (Offizielle Top 100)	37
Irish Albums (IRMA)	21
Italian Albums (FIMI)	12
Mexican Albums (Top 100 Mexico)	36
New Zealand Albums (RMNZ)	10
Norwegian Albums (VG-lista)	33
Polish Albums (ZPAV)	24
Portuguese Albums (AFP)	1
Scottish Albums (Official Charts)	38
Spanish Albums (Promusicae)	33
Swiss Albums (Schweizer Hitparade)	35
UK Albums (Official Charts)	47
