= Singles (soundtrack) =

Singles: Original Motion Picture Soundtrack

Soundtrack album by various artists
- Released: June 30, 1992
- Recorded: 1960, 1988, 1991–1992
- Genres: Grunge, alternative rock, heavy metal, alternative metal
- Length: 65:27
- Label: Epic Soundtrax
- Producer: Various

Singles from Singles: Original Motion Picture Soundtrack
- 1. "Would?" Released: June 8, 1992; 2. "Nearly Lost You" Released: August 1992

Professional ratings
Aggregate scores
Source	Rating
Metacritic	93/100 (deluxe edition)
Review scores
Source	Rating
AllMusic	4.5/5 stars
Classic Rock	4/5 stars
Consequence of Sound	A+
Kerrang!	(1992) (2017)
Mojo	4/5 stars
Paste	8.4/10
Pitchfork	8.7/10
Uncut	8/10

Singles is the soundtrack album of the 1992 film Singles, released on June 30, 1992, almost three months before the film. It is primarily focused on the ascendant Seattle grunge scene of the early 1990s, but also features contributions from past Seattle artists Jimi Hendrix and the Lovemongers (Heart's Ann and Nancy Wilson, the latter of whom was the wife of the film's director Cameron Crowe at the time), Chicago's the Smashing Pumpkins, and the first solo material from Minneapolis' Paul Westerberg after the breakup of the Replacements.

The album peaked at number 6 on the Billboard 200 on the week of October 10, 1992 and has been certified two times platinum by the Recording Industry Association of America (RIAA), indicating sales of at least two million copies in the United States. In April 2019, it was ranked No. 19 on Rolling Stone's "50 Greatest Grunge Albums" list.

A Deluxe Edition of the album featuring a bonus disc with 18 additional tracks was released on May 19, 2017, one day after the death of Soundgarden frontman Chris Cornell, whose music is featured prominently on the soundtrack and who has a cameo in the film; this was only a coincidence, as the album's release date had been announced in January. Songs used in the movie, but not included on either edition of the soundtrack, include: "Three Days" by Jane's Addiction, "Little Girl" by Muddy Waters, "Dig for Fire" by the Pixies, "Radio Song" by R.E.M., "Blue Train" by John Coltrane, "Family Affair" by Sly & the Family Stone, "She Sells Sanctuary" by the Cult, and "Jinx" by Tad.

== Impact ==
The soundtrack is credited with contributing to the surge in popularity of Seattle grunge in the early 1990s. According to Steve Huey of AllMusic, "Singles helped crystallize the idea of the 'Seattle scene' in the mainstream public's mind, and it was also one of the first big-selling '90s movie soundtracks (it went platinum and reached the Top Ten) to feature largely new work from contemporary artists ... it's a milestone in the breakthrough of alternative rock into mainstream popular culture, neatly and effectively packaging the Seattle phenomenon for the wider national consciousness."

== Deluxe Edition ==
On May 19, 2017, a remastered Deluxe Edition of the album was released to commemorate the original album's 25th anniversary. In addition to the original 13-song soundtrack on either one CD or two LPs, this release included new liner notes and track-by-track descriptions by Cameron Crowe and a bonus CD consisting of 18 additional tracks. The bonus material included a track each from Truly and Blood Circus, live tracks by Alice in Chains and Soundgarden that were recorded during their performances in the film, and demos and instrumentals by Mudhoney, Paul Westerberg, Chris Cornell, and members of Pearl Jam. Of these tracks, seven were previously unreleased, and five had never been released on CD. Also included is "Touch Me I'm Dick" by Matt Dillon’s fictional band in the film, Citizen Dick, which was recorded by Pearl Jam's Eddie Vedder, Stone Gossard, and Jeff Ament.

== Track listing ==
No.	Title	Writer(s)	Artist	Length
1.	"Would?"	Jerry Cantrell	Alice in Chains	3:27
2.	"Breath"	Eddie Vedder; Stone Gossard	Pearl Jam	5:25
3.	"Seasons" (from the "Poncier" tape)	Chris Cornell	Chris Cornell	5:45
4.	"Dyslexic Heart"	Paul Westerberg	Paul Westerberg	4:28
5.	"The Battle of Evermore" (live Led Zeppelin cover)	Jimmy Page; Robert Plant	The Lovemongers	5:41
6.	"Chloe Dancer/Crown of Thorns"	Andrew Wood; Mother Love Bone (Wood, Gossard, Jeff Ament, Bruce Fairweather, Greg Gilmore)	Mother Love Bone	8:16
7.	"Birth Ritual"	Cornell; Matt Cameron, Kim Thayil	Soundgarden	6:05
8.	"State of Love and Trust"	Vedder; Mike McCready; Ament	Pearl Jam	3:46
9.	"Overblown"	Mudhoney (Mark Arm, Steve Turner, Matt Lukin, Dan Peters)	Mudhoney	2:58
10.	"Waiting for Somebody"	Westerberg	Paul Westerberg	3:25
11.	"May This Be Love"	Jimi Hendrix	The Jimi Hendrix Experience	3:10
12.	"Nearly Lost You"	Van Conner; Mark Lanegan; Lee Conner	Screaming Trees	4:06
13.	"Drown"	Billy Corgan	The Smashing Pumpkins	8:17
Total length:				64:49

2017 Deluxe Edition – Disc 2
No.	Title	Writer(s)	Artist	Length
1.	"Touch Me I'm Dick" (parody of "Touch Me I'm Sick" by Mudhoney)	Mudhoney	Citizen Dick (Eddie Vedder, Stone Gossard, Jeff Ament)	3:00
2.	"Nowhere But You" (from the "Poncier" tape)	Cornell	Chris Cornell	5:10
3.	"Spoon Man" (from the "Poncier" tape)	Cornell	Chris Cornell	3:35
4.	"Flutter Girl" (from the "Poncier" tape)	Cornell	Chris Cornell	6:23
5.	"Missing" (from the "Poncier" tape)	Cornell	Chris Cornell	5:33
6.	"Would? (live)"	Cantrell	Alice in Chains	3:58
7.	"It Ain't Like That (live)"	Cantrell; Sean Kinney; Mike Starr	Alice in Chains	4:44
8.	"Birth Ritual (live)"	Cornell; Cameron; Thayil	Soundgarden	5:27
9.	"Dyslexic Heart (acoustic)"	Westerberg	Paul Westerberg	3:42
10.	"Waiting for Somebody (score acoustic)"	Westerberg	Paul Westerberg	1:40
11.	"Overblown (demo)"	Mudhoney	Mudhoney	2:56
12.	"Heart and Lungs"	Truly (Robert Roth, Chris Quinn, Hiro Yamamoto, Mark Pickerel)	Truly	4:20
13.	"Six Foot Under"	Michael Anderson; Doug Day; Geoff Robinson; Tracy Simmons	Blood Circus	3:51
14.	"Singles Blues I" (instrumental)	McCready	Mike McCready	1:54
15.	"Blue Heart" (instrumental version of "Dyslexic Heart")	Westerberg	Paul Westerberg	3:27
16.	"Lost in Emily's Woods" (instrumental)	Westerberg	Paul Westerberg	1:44
17.	"Ferry Boat #3"	Cornell	Chris Cornell	4:59
18.	"Score Piece #4" (instrumental)	Cornell	Chris Cornell	2:05
Total length:				68:28

- In addition to later recording "Spoon Man" with Soundgarden (as "Spoonman") and "Flutter Girl" on his debut solo album, Chris Cornell reused the lyrics of the first two verses and bridge of "Ferry Boat #3" in the song "The Curse" on Audioslave's 2005 album Out of Exile.

== Certifications ==
Region	Certification	Certified units/sales
United States (RIAA)	2× Platinum	2,000,000^{^}
^{^} Shipments figures based on certification alone.
