= Breath (Pearl Jam song) =

Song by Pearl Jam

from the album Singles: Original Motion Picture Soundtrack
- Released: June 30, 1992
- Recorded: January 1992 at London Bridge Studios, Seattle, Washington (Singles: Original Motion Picture Soundtrack version); October 23, 1990 at Potatohead Studio, Seattle, Washington (Ten reissue version)
- Genre: Grunge
- Length: 5:24
- Label: Epic
- Songwriters: Eddie Vedder, Stone Gossard
- Producers: Rick Parashar, Pearl Jam

"Breath" is a song by the American rock band Pearl Jam. Featuring lyrics written by vocalist Eddie Vedder and music written by guitarist Stone Gossard, "Breath" first appeared on the soundtrack to the 1992 film, Singles. The song was included on Pearl Jam's 2004 greatest hits album, rearviewmirror (Greatest Hits 1991–2003). An early version of the song, entitled "Breath and a Scream", was included as part of the reissue of the band's debut album, Ten, in 2009.

== Origin and recording ==
"Breath" features lyrics written by vocalist Eddie Vedder and music written by guitarist Stone Gossard. The song originated as an instrumental demo called "Doobie E" that was written by Gossard in 1990. "Breath" became a Ten outtake. The version of "Breath" recorded during the Ten sessions, entitled "Breath and a Scream", appears on the 2009 Ten reissue.

A re-recorded version of "Breath" later appeared on the soundtrack to the 1992 film, Singles. This version of the song was recorded in 1992 and was one of the first songs to be recorded with drummer Dave Abbruzzese. The same sessions also produced "State of Love and Trust", "Dirty Frank", and the re-recorded version of "Even Flow".

Guitarist Stone Gossard on the song:

"Breath" is on the first demo we did as a band. I used a Les Paul and Marshall on that track. We didn't really have time to mess around and bring in my Vox AC30 and my Steinberger! We had a day-and-a-half to do it, so I just played through my normal setup.

Guitarist Mike McCready on the song:

That was a really old song of Stone's from his days in Mother Love Bone. It was just another chance for me to do a lot of leads. The song was kind of cool at the time because it reminded me of performing. For me, it was about playing live.

== Live performances ==
"Breath" was first performed live at the band's October 22, 1990 concert in Seattle, Washington at the Off Ramp Café. After the band's April 11, 1994 concert in Boston, Massachusetts at the Boston Garden, the song was not performed live for a period of four years. During the band's 1998 Yield Tour an organized fan campaign dubbed the "Breath Campaign" was started in which fans brought signs to shows requesting the song. "Breath" finally made a return appearance at the band's September 11, 1998 concert in New York City at Madison Square Garden. The song has since returned to Pearl Jam set lists. Live performances of "Breath" can be found on various official bootlegs. A performance of the song is also included on the DVD Live at the Garden.
