= State of Love and Trust =

Pearl Jam song

Song by Pearl Jam

from the album Singles: Original Motion Picture Soundtrack
- Released: June 30, 1992
- Recorded: January 1992 at London Bridge Studios, Seattle (Singles: Original Motion Picture Soundtrack version); March 27 – April 26, 1991 at London Bridge Studios, Seattle (Ten reissue version)
- Genre: Grunge
- Length: 3:46
- Label: Epic
- Songwriters: Eddie Vedder, Mike McCready, Jeff Ament
- Producers: Rick Parashar, Pearl Jam

"State of Love and Trust" is a song by the American rock band Pearl Jam. Featuring lyrics written by vocalist Eddie Vedder and music co-written by guitarist Mike McCready and bassist Jeff Ament, "State of Love and Trust" first appeared on the soundtrack to the 1992 film, Singles. The song was included on Pearl Jam's 2004 greatest hits album, Rearviewmirror (Greatest Hits 1991–2003). An early version of the song was included as part of the reissue of the band's debut album, Ten, in 2009.

== Origin and recording ==
"State of Love and Trust" features lyrics written by vocalist Eddie Vedder and music co-written by guitarist Mike McCready and bassist Jeff Ament. The song was originally recorded during the sessions for Ten with the possible intention of appearing in the film Singles. Ament said, "The version of 'State of Love and Trust' with Dave Krusen on drums is so much better than what ended up being released," and added, "He really plays that song in the spirit it was written in. It has a much trashier, Crazy Horse feel to it. It's awesome." The version of "State of Love and Trust" recorded during the Ten sessions eventually appeared on the 2009 reissue of Ten.

The version of "State of Love and Trust" heard in the film Singles and on its soundtrack was recorded in 1992 and was one of the first songs to be recorded with drummer Dave Abbruzzese. The same sessions also produced "Breath", "Dirty Frank", and the re-recorded version of "Even Flow".

== Lyrics ==
According to Ament, the lyrics for "State of Love and Trust" are based on what Vedder took from watching the film, and added, "I think he probably took a heavier angle on what the movie was about than a lot of people will, but that's Eddie, which is a beautiful thing." According to Cameron Crowe, director of Singles, the song is "about battling with your instincts in love." Before a performance of the song at Pearl Jam's September 8, 1998 show in East Rutherford, New Jersey at Continental Airlines Arena, Vedder introduced it as "a song about being faithful."

== In other media ==
In March 2009, a live version of "State of Love and Trust" taken from the band's September 20, 1992 concert was made available as a downloadable bonus track for the Rock Band series for those who purchase the Ten re-release through Best Buy.

== Live performances ==
"State of Love and Trust" was first performed live at the band's July 12, 1991 concert in Philadelphia at JC Dobbs. Pearl Jam performed the song for its appearance on MTV Unplugged in 1992. When "State of Love and Trust" was performed by Pearl Jam at the MTV Singles Scene movie release party, Vedder intentionally interjected expletives into the song's lyrics. Clips from the studio version were spliced into the performance by Brendan O'Brien so that it could air on television. Live performances of "State of Love and Trust" can be found on the "Dissident"/Live in Atlanta box set, various official bootlegs, the Live at the Gorge 05/06 box set, the live album Live at Lollapalooza 2007, Live on Ten Legs, and the Drop in the Park LP included in the Super Deluxe edition of the Ten reissue. Performances of the song are also included on the DVD Immagine in Cornice and the MTV Unplugged DVD included in the Ten reissue.

== Cover versions ==
A live version of "State of Love and Trust" by the band The Gaslight Anthem can be found on the band's 2009 "The '59 Sound" single. A cover of the song also appears on their iTunes Session EP. Gaslight Anthem has played "State of Love and Trust" with Vedder in concert.
