= The Jane Austen Argument =

Australian musical duo

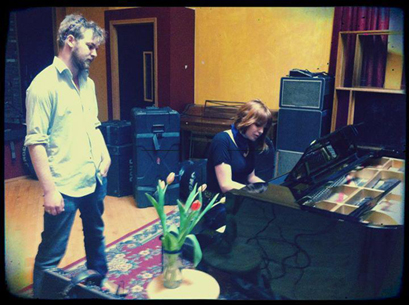
- Tom Dickins (left) and Jen Kingwell (right)

Background information
- Origin: Melbourne, Australia
- Genres: Cabaret, Indie
- Years active: 2010–present
- Members: Tom Dickins, Jen Kingwell
- Website: thejaneaustenargument.net

The Jane Austen Argument is an Australian musical duo from Melbourne. Formed in 2010 by Tom Dickins (vocals, piano, ukulele) and Jen Kingwell (piano, vocals, ukulele), the band considers themselves an "indie cabaret duo with overtones of anti-folk and punk love". The duo has had a great amount of support by friend and fellow artist Amanda Palmer, and have supported her on her Goes Down Under Tour of 2011 as well as featured on her compilation record of the same name. Their debut album Somewhere Under The Rainbow was released through Bandcamp on 2 March 2012.

== Career ==
=== Formation and naming ===
Dickins and Kingwell met in 2009, during a cigarette break whilst working at a student union discovering mutual interests such as Regina Spektor and Nick Cave. Dickins at the time was planning a cabaret show, but was in need of a pianist, whereas Kingwell, a skilled pianist, was in need of a partner. The two began playing together in 2009, and in 2010 decided to make their musical partnership official. After initial difficulty settling on a name, the pair decided on The Jane Austen Argument, in reference to a long-running difference of opinion over the works of Jane Austen.

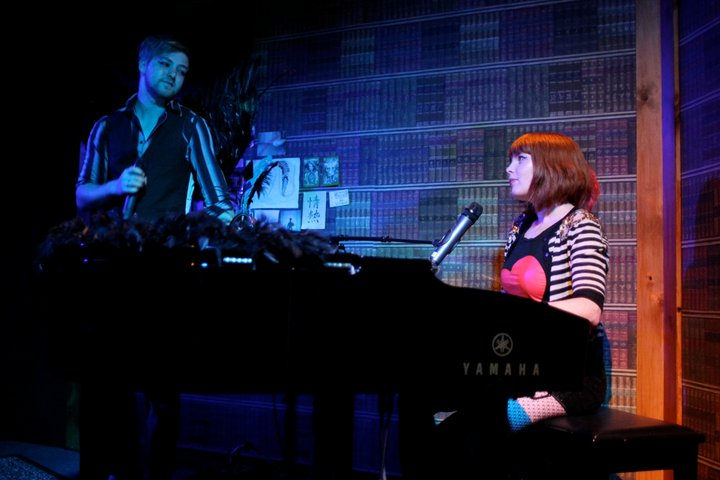
Tom and Jen perform at The Spaces Between show.

=== Early performances ===
Prior to the release of their first EP, the duo performed at numerous music festivals within Australia, performing at Midsumma Festival and MONA FOMA. In 2010, they won the title of Best Cabaret Performance for their performance of Where Was I? at the Adelaide Fringe Festival, a title they won again in 2011, as well as being Highly Commended for the Best Cabaret award for their performance of The Spaces Between at Melbourne Fringe Festival.

=== The Birthing Pyre and Amanda Palmer Goes Down Under ===
Amanda Palmer, a long-time friend of Tom Dickins, promoted the band, often having them open for her at her own shows and performing alongside them. A recording of Dickins and Palmer performing a duet of Bad Wine and Lemon Cake at the Adelaide Fringe Festival was included in Palmer's 2011 album Amanda Palmer Goes Down Under. In January 2011, the duo supported the Amanda Palmer Goes Down Under tour, launching their debut EP The Birthing Pyre at Palmer's Australia Day Spectacular show at the Sydney Opera House on 26 January 2011. When recording the last track of the EP, The Debt Collectors, Dickins and Kingwell used social networking websites to advertise a need for backing vocals. Several fans recorded themselves singing and harmonising the parts described by Dickins, and sent the audio to the band. These fans are credited in the EP liner notes as the "Twitter Choir".

=== The Plan Behind (The Beautiful Mess We Made) ===
In May 2011, Dickins played his solo Fuck Plan B show at Revolt Melbourne. Named from an email from Amanda Palmer, in which she told him: "Jettison the job. Fuck Plan B. I'll support you in any way I can", Tom announced on 20 May at a show at Revolt Melbourne that he had quit his job and was dedicated to pursuing his musical career full-time. This gig was recorded, and released as the band's second EP, The Plan Behind (The Beautiful Mess We Made), which itself launched on 28 July 2011.

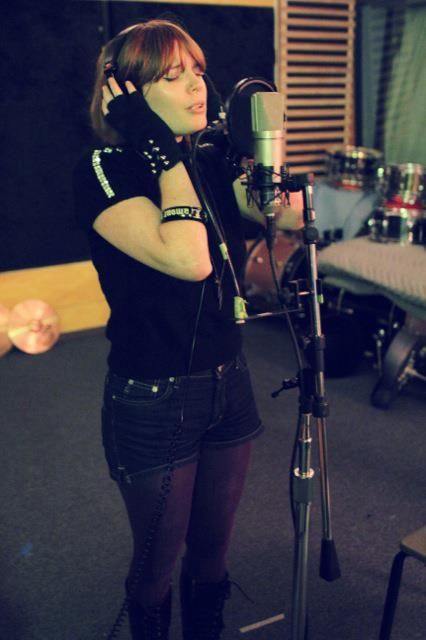
Jen Kingwell recording vocals for Somewhere Under the Rainbow at London Bridge Studios

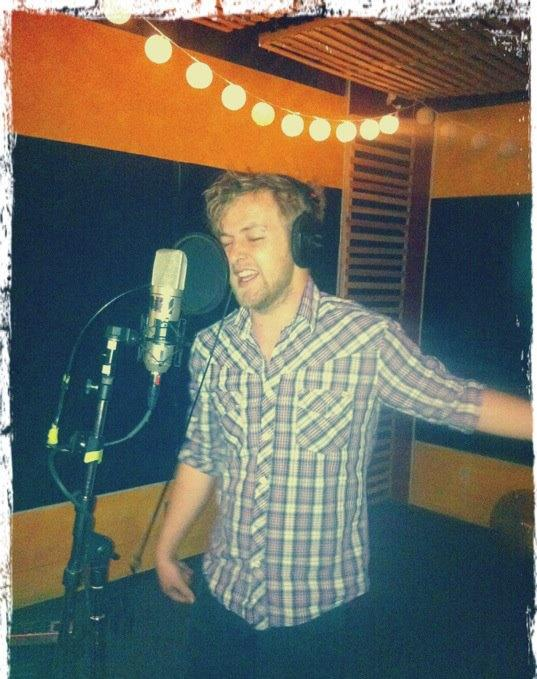
Tom Dickins recording vocals for Somewhere Under the Rainbow at London Bridge Studios

=== Pozible Fundraiser, Seattle and Dickins-In-Exile ===
On 21 July 2011, the band announced their intentions to record their debut album, Somewhere Under The Rainbow, in Seattle. However, at that point they had not yet accumulated the finances to do this, so, simultaneously, they announced a fundraiser, hosted by Australian crowdfunding website Pozible. Although the band required an additional $10,000 for their fund, they set their target donation total at $5,000, offering fans special gifts in exchange for donations. Rewards were conditional to the amount donated, and included a vast amount of goods, from a free digital download of Somewhere Under the Rainbow for $5, to appearances in future music videos for donations over $1,000. As a result of their efforts of the band, and that of their fans, the band earned a total of $9,063, 181% of their initial goal of $5,000.

After performing at the Edinburgh Fringe Festival, the band did a brief tour of Europe before setting in Seattle to record their album at London Bridge Studio. During this period, they also recorded a music video for a track on their upcoming album. The band released the first single, Holes, for order online on 3 November. The lyrics to the titular song were written by friend and famed author Neil Gaiman.

After recording the tracks for Somewhere Under the Rainbow, the band accompanied Amanda Palmer and Neil Gaiman on a tour of North America on the 'Evening with Neil Gaiman & Amanda Palmer' tour. After travelling to Canada for a show in Vancouver, Dickins was not permitted re-entry into the United States. This period became referred to by Dickins, and fans, as "Dickins-In-Exile". Shortly after, the band returned to Australia.

In January 2012, The Jane Austen Argument supported The Dresden Dolls as an opening act on their tour of Australia.

=== Somewhere Under the Rainbow ===
On 24 February 2012, the Jane Austen Argument's debut album, Somewhere Under the Rainbow, was made available for pre-release download for those who donated to the Pozible fund.

On 27 February 2012, Somewhere Under the Rainbow was made available for pre-order. Pre-ordering the album allowed buyers to download the first three tracks of the album prior to the release. The pre-order peaked at number 1 on Bandcamp on the same day.

The duo launched their album to the public on 2 March 2012 during a round of performances at Adelaide Fringe Festival.

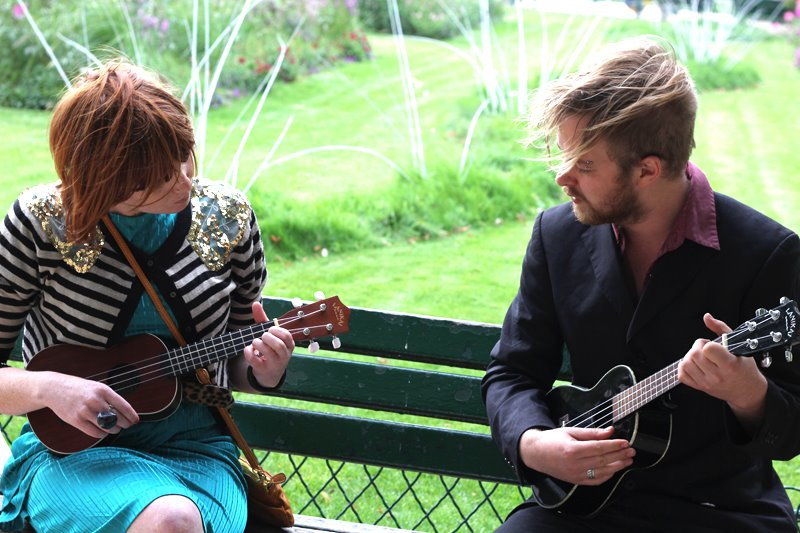
The Jane Austen Argument frequently perform "Twitnics" for their fans.

== Arrangement, theatrics and "Twitnics" ==
Both Tom Dickins and Jen Kingwell play piano and ukulele, as well as contribute vocals to their songs. Dickins can also play guitar. The arrangement of instruments and singing varies, though Kingwell generally plays the piano more often than Dickins, each contributing vocals equally.

The band have adopted a unique style of dress when performing. Feathers, glitter and make-up feature heavily in their costumes during their performances. Dickins has become well known for wearing a pair of upside-down black wings at his live performances. The duo also frequently include humour as part of their live performances.

During the 'Amanda Palmer Goes Down Under Tour', the band began doing meets with fans, and small, free public performances. These soon became known as "Twitnics", a portmanteau referring to the use of social networking to plan and promote these small performances, as well as their picnic-like nature.

== Discography ==
EPs:

- The Birthing Pyre (2011)
- The Plan Behind (The Beautiful Mess We Made) (2011)

Singles:

- Under The Rainbow/Weightless Double Single (With Neon Bogart) (2011)
- Holes (2011)
- northsoutheastwest (2012)

Studio albums:

- Somewhere Under The Rainbow (2012)

== Awards and commendations ==
- Won – Best Cabaret at the Adelaide Fringe Festival, 2010
- Highly Commended – Best Cabaret at the Melbourne Fringe Festival, 2010

Additionally, Tom and Jen directed Sophie Walsh Harrington's Damsel in Shining Armour show at the 2011 Adelaide Fringe Festival, which won the Best Cabaret award.
