= Apple (Mother Love Bone album) =

Studio album by Mother Love Bone
- Released: August 14, 1990
- Recorded: Fall 1989 at The Plant, Sausalito, California, and Winter 1989 at London Bridge, Seattle, Washington
- Genres: Grunge; hard rock; alternative rock; glam rock
- Length: 57:59
- Labels: Stardog/Mercury; Lemon Recordings (reissue)
- Producers: Bruce Calder, Terry Date, Mark Dearnley, Mother Love Bone

Mother Love Bone chronology
Shine (1989)	Apple (1990)	Mother Love Bone (1992)

Singles from Apple
- 1. "Stardog Champion" Released: August 1990; 2. "This Is Shangrila" Released: 1990; 3. "Stargazer" Released: 1990

Apple is the only full-length studio album by the American rock band Mother Love Bone. It was released on August 14, 1990, through Stardog/Mercury Records.

Days before Apple was slated to be released, lead singer Andrew Wood overdosed on heroin. After spending a few days in the hospital in a coma, he died, effectively bringing Mother Love Bone to an end. The album would see release later that year in August, and it eventually peaked at number 34 on Billboard's Top Heatseekers chart in 1992.

== Reception ==
Professional ratings
Review scores
Source	Rating
AllMusic	4.5/5 stars
Classic Rock	4.5/5 stars
Rock Hard	7.5/10
Select	2/5 medals
Uncut	1.5/5 stars

Kim Neely of Rolling Stone said that the album "succeeds where countless other hard-rock albums have failed, capturing the essence of what made Zep – dynamics, kids! – and giving it a unique Nineties spin." David Browne, in The New York Times, opined that "Apple may be one of the first great hard-rock records of the 90's."

In 2005, Apple was ranked No. 462 in Rock Hard's book "The 500 Greatest Rock & Metal Albums of All Time". In 2016, Apple was ranked No. 18 in Rolling Stone's "40 Greatest One-Album Wonders". In 2022, Stuart Berman and Jeremy D. Larson of Pitchfork included the album in their list of "The 25 Best Grunge Albums of the '90s". In 2025, Em Casalena of American Songwriter included the album in the site's list of "4 Grunge Albums That Are Way Better Than Nevermind".

== Track listing ==
All lyrics written by Andrew Wood. All music written by Jeff Ament, Bruce Fairweather, Greg Gilmore, Stone Gossard, and Andrew Wood. Primary composers listed below.

1. "This Is Shangrila" (Gossard) – 3:42
2. "Stardog Champion" (Gossard) – 4:58
3. "Holy Roller" (Ament) – 4:27
4. "Bone China" (Gossard) – 3:44
5. "Come Bite the Apple" (Gossard) – 5:26
6. "Stargazer" (Wood) – 4:49
7. "Heartshine" – 4:36
8. "Captain Hi-Top" – 3:07
9. "Man of Golden Words" (Wood) – 3:41
10. "Capricorn Sister" (Gossard) – 4:19
11. "Gentle Groove" (Wood) – 4:02
12. "Mr. Danny Boy" (Gossard) – 4:50
13. "Crown of Thorns" (Wood) – 6:18

Reissue bonus track

14. "Lady Godiva Blues" – 3:40

== Personnel ==
Mother Love Bone

- Andrew Wood – vocals, piano
- Bruce Fairweather – lead guitar
- Stone Gossard – rhythm guitar
- Jeff Ament – bass
- Greg Gilmore – drums

Production

- Scott Blockland – assistant engineering
- Bruce Calder – production on "Stargazer"
- Terry Date, Mother Love Bone – production
- Mark Dearnley – production on "Crown of Thorns"
- Kaylin Frank – production coordination
- Dennis Herring, Davitt Sigerson – pre-production
- Klotz – design
- Bob Ludwig – mastering
- Lance Mercer – photo
- Tim Palmer – mixing
- Denny Swofford – assistance
