= Singles (1992 film) =

1992 film by Cameron Crowe

- Theatrical release poster
- Directed by: Cameron Crowe
- Written by: Cameron Crowe
- Produced by: Cameron Crowe; Richard Hashimoto
- Starring: Bridget Fonda; Campbell Scott; Kyra Sedgwick; Sheila Kelley; Jim True; Bill Pullman; Matt Dillon
- Cinematography: Tak Fujimoto; Ueli Steiger
- Edited by: Richard Chew
- Music by: Paul Westerberg
- Distributed by: Warner Bros.
- Release date: September 18, 1992
- Running time: 99 minutes
- Country: United States
- Language: English
- Budget: $9 million
- Box office: $18.5 million

Singles is a 1992 American romantic comedy film written, co-produced, and directed by Cameron Crowe, and starring Bridget Fonda, Campbell Scott, Kyra Sedgwick, and Matt Dillon. It features appearances from several musicians prominent in the early 1990s grunge movement in Seattle.

The film was distributed by Warner Bros. and released theatrically on September 18, 1992, to positive reviews from critics and moderate box office success, grossing over $18 million.

"It's the story of disconnected single people making their way, forming their own unspoken family," Crowe wrote.

== Plot ==
Singles centers on the precarious romantic lives of a group of twentysomethings in Seattle, Washington, at the start of the 1990s grunge phenomenon. Most of the characters dwell in an apartment block, a sign in front of which advertises "Singles" (studio apartments) for rent. Divided into chapters, the film focuses on the course of two couples' rocky romances, as well as the love lives of their friends and associates.

The film revolves around Janet Livermore, a coffee-bar waitress fawning over Cliff Poncier, an aspiring yet slightly aloof grunge rock musician of the fictional grunge/rock band Citizen Dick; Linda Powell and Steve Dunne, a couple wavering on whether to commit to each other; Debbie Hunt, trying to find Mr. Right.

== Cast ==
- Bridget Fonda as Janet Livermore
- Campbell Scott as Steve Dunne
- Kyra Sedgwick as Linda Powell
- Sheila Kelley as Debbie Hunt
- Jim True-Frost as David Bailey
- Matt Dillon as Cliff Poncier
- Bill Pullman as Dr. Jeffrey Jamison
- James LeGros as Andy
- Devon Raymond as Ruth
- Camilo Gallardo as Luiz
- Ally Walker as Pam
- Eric Stoltz as The Mime
- Jeremy Piven as Doug Hughley
- Tom Skerritt as Mayor Weber
- Peter Horton as Jamie

Eddie Vedder, Stone Gossard and Jeff Ament (all of Pearl Jam) play the band members of Citizen Dick. There are appearances from Alice in Chains and Soundgarden, as well as cameos by film director Tim Burton and basketball player Xavier McDaniel as himself. Paul Giamatti and Victor Garber appear in minor roles.

== Production ==
=== Development ===
Cameron Crowe said the film was "a love letter to Seattle, a romance set in that city. It had a really simple theme—single people coming together to create their own family."

Crowe rewrote the script after the death of singer Andy Wood. He wanted to capture "the story of how people instinctively need to be together. Is anybody truly single?"

Crowe said the critical success of Say Anything... along with "the success of Nora Ephron's movies, gave Warner Bros. the feeling that people might embrace a love story within a romantic comedy."

=== Casting ===
Crowe wanted the film to be an ensemble piece about six characters with "the feeling that you can easily follow any one of these actors and their character off into their own little movie."

Crowe wrote Bridget Fonda's part specifically for her, having been impressed by her performance in Scandal. He later wrote, "For months, in person or on the telephone, we've discussed every aspect of Singles. Like a dry young Barbara Stanwyck, she nailed down every small detail of Janet's life."

Johnny Depp was offered the role of Steve Dunne but declined.

Campbell Scott was cast on the same day he was cast as Julia Roberts' co star in Dying Young, which would be filmed first. Scott played a leukemia victim in that film and Crowe's journals from making Singles are full of references to concern from the studio over his hair.

According to Art Linson, $50,000 was budgeted for the role of Cliff. Dillon wanted to play it but his fee was $1 million and the studio would not pay it. After negotiations, it was agreed he would play the part for $400,000.

=== Shooting ===
Filming began on March 11, 1991. Principal photography wrapped on May 24, 1991.

The film was shot at a number of locations around Seattle and includes scenes at Gas Works Park, Capitol Hill, Jimi Hendrix's original grave at Greenwood Memorial Park in Renton, the Pike Place Market and the Virginia Inn. The central coffee shop featured in the film is the now-closed OK Hotel. The apartment building is located on the northwest corner of the intersection of E. Thomas St & 19th Ave E. (1820 E. Thomas St.). Additional concert footage was shot in the now-defunct RKCNDY bar. Alice in Chains' concert was filmed at the Desoto nightclub. Also, Soundgarden makes an appearance in the film.

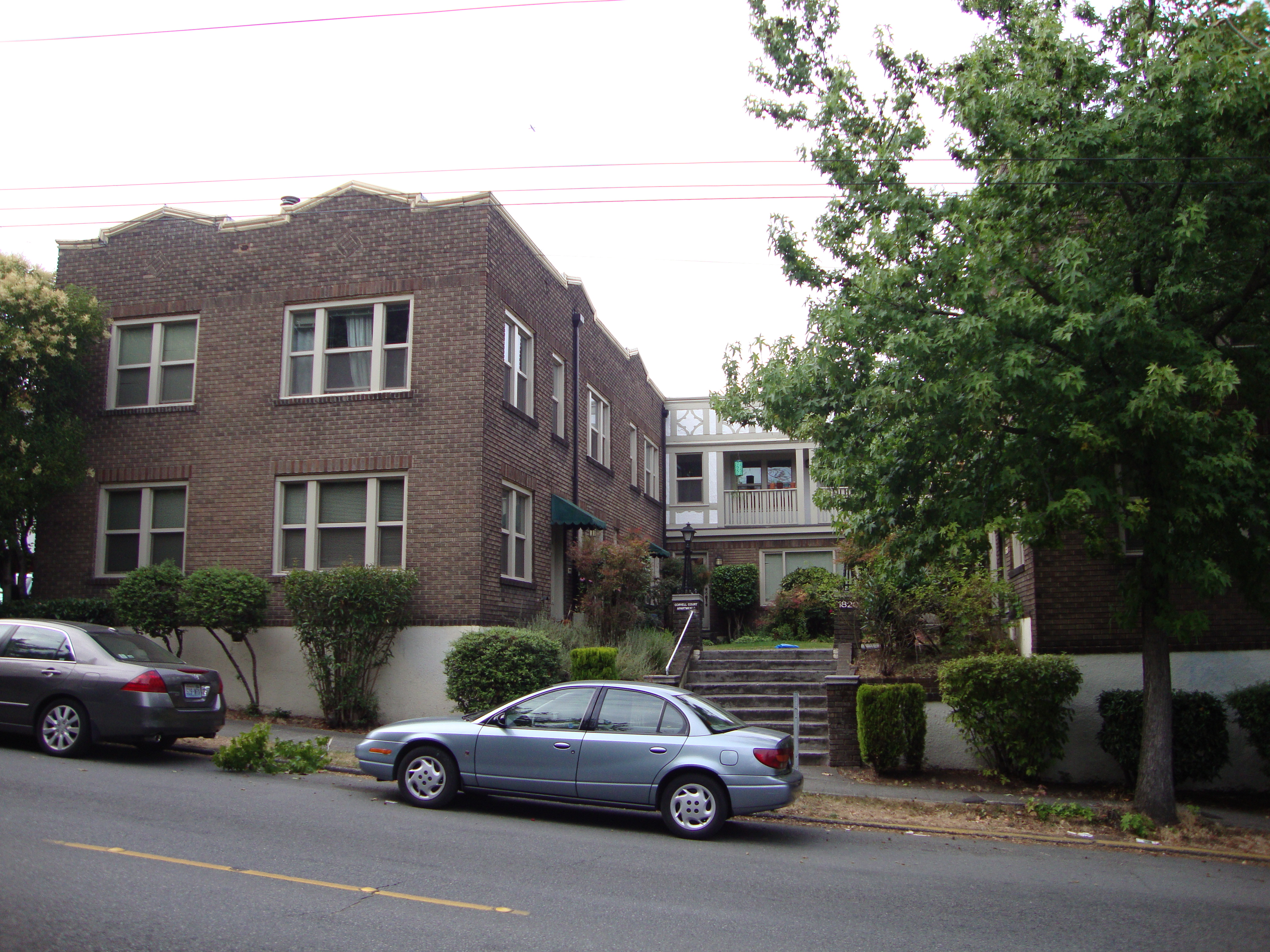
The apartment building that was used as the main set for Singles.

Most of Dillon's wardrobe in the film actually belonged to Pearl Jam bassist Jeff Ament. During the making of the film, Ament produced a list of song titles for the fictional band, Citizen Dick. Chris Cornell took it as a challenge to write songs for the film using those titles, and "Spoonman" was one of them. An early acoustic version of the song was created and can be heard in the background during a scene of the film. Citizen Dick's song "Touch Me, I'm Dick" is a parody of the song "Touch Me, I'm Sick" by the Seattle band Mudhoney. On the inside cover photo of the soundtrack, there is a Citizen Dick CD with the track listing on the CD itself. One of the songs is called "Louder Than Larry (Steiner)", a wordplay on the Soundgarden album, Louder Than Love.

On 8 April Crowe wrote in his journal, "My working relationship with Campbell is deteriorating daily. The air is thick with the unspoken. I know it's not easy for him. Steve Dunne is the hardest part in the movie. All around him are characters with odd and interesting quirks. He is the Curse of the Normal Guy." This resulted in a big argument on set two days later.

Eric Stoltz, who had been in other Crowe films such as Fast Times at Ridgemont High and Say Anything..., had a cameo as a mime. He and Fonda were dating at the time.

On April 30, Crowe wrote:

The Car Crash scene goes well. Today I overhear two grips having a conversation about me on the radio-mike headset. I hear that I look especially happy today, that I must have gotten laid last night and that after all the talky scenes it was great to get out there today and "T-bone that fuckin' car."

== Post-production ==
The film previewed disappointingly. Crowe persuaded Warner Bros to finance a reshoot of the scene where Steve and Linda broke up. This included a scene where Steve spoke on the phone to Linda. The film previewed better.

In January 1992 Crowe wrote:

WB has offered new title suggestions: In the Midnight Hour, Love in Seattle , Leave Me a Message and a grim selection of others. It's all done politely, of course, but the pressure is unmistakable. Now, with the success of Nirvana, they've come up with yet another title: Come as You Are. I am powerless to stop them.

The film was meant to be released in April 1992 but this date was pulled back. The soundtrack was released and this helped the film secure a release date.

== Reception ==
Singles holds a 79% critical approval rating on the review aggregator Rotten Tomatoes based on 53 reviews with an average rating of 6.9/10. The site's critical consensus reads "Smart, funny, and engagingly scruffy, Singles is a clear-eyed look at modern romance that doubles as a credible grunge-era time capsule". Metacritic, which uses a weighted average, assigned the film a score of 71 out of 100, based on 24 critics, indicating "generally favorable" reviews.

Roger Ebert of The Chicago Sun-Times was complimentary, giving Singles three out of four stars and declaring it "not a great cutting-edge movie, and parts of it may be too whimsical and disorganized for audiences raised on cause-and-effect plots [... but] I found myself smiling a lot during the movie, sometimes with amusement, sometimes with recognition. It's easy to like these characters, and care about them." Tim Appelo wrote in Entertainment Weekly, "With [...] an ambling, naturalistic style, Crowe captures the eccentric appeal of a town where espresso carts sprout on every corner and kids in ratty flannel shirts can cut records that make them millionaires." Meanwhile, Seattle's The Stranger was less kind to Crowe's use of the local background, reviewing "he's relying on the general hipness of our little burg and on the star power of a few local musicians/bit actors to make a bundle of dough, and he hasn't bothered to back them up with anything worth remembering. Pleasant is about the only word I can think of to describe the thing."

Crowe later said "To me the problem with Singles is the structure. I loved every Singles vignette, but I don't think they hang together as they should have... you've got to make the vignettes hang together to tell a bigger story, and then you're not going to have a stop-and-start feeling. Singles, to me, has a little bit of that stop-and-start feel. Each individual part stands alone, but together they stand on rickety legs."

Warner Bros. Television immediately tried to turn Singles into a television series. Crowe claimed that Singles inspired the television series Friends.

On July 5, 2015, Derek Erdman held a public screening of the film in the courtyard of Capitol Hill's Coryell Court Apartments—the building in which some of the main characters live. The event was attended by over 1,000 people. Despite initial concerns by the landlord, the event progressed smoothly. The crowd was respectful and cleaned up after themselves. Reports of Bridget Fonda being in attendance were false, but her aunt— Jane Fonda— was indeed there.

The film is recognized by American Film Institute in these lists:

- 2002: AFI's 100 Years...100 Passions – Nominated

== Soundtrack ==
The Singles soundtrack was released on June 30, 1992, through Epic Records and became a best seller three months before the release of the film. The soundtrack included music from key bands from the grunge scene of the time, such as Alice in Chains, Pearl Jam, Screaming Trees, and Soundgarden. Pearl Jam performed two previously unreleased songs on the soundtrack: "Breath" and "State of Love and Trust". The Soundgarden song "Birth Ritual" and Chris Cornell's solo song "Seasons" appear on the soundtrack. Paul Westerberg of The Replacements contributed two songs to the soundtrack and provided the score for the film. The Smashing Pumpkins also contributed to the soundtrack with the song "Drown".

== Notes ==
- Emery, Robert J (2003). The Directors Take Four. Allworth Press. ISBN 9781581152791.
