= Andrew Wood (singer) =

American rock musician (1966–1990)

- Wood (front) with Mother Love Bone in 1989

Background information
- Also known as: Andy Wood; Landrew the Love Child; "Man of Golden Words"
- Born: Andrew Patrick Wood; January 8, 1966; Columbus, Mississippi, U.S.
- Died: March 19, 1990 (aged 24) Seattle, Washington, U.S.
- Genres: Alternative rock; grunge; glam rock
- Occupations: Singer; musician; songwriter
- Instruments: Vocals; bass guitar; piano
- Years active: 1980–1990
- Formerly of: Malfunkshun; Mother Love Bone

Andrew Patrick Wood (January 8, 1966 – March 19, 1990) was an American musician who was the lead singer and lyricist for the grunge bands Malfunkshun and Mother Love Bone. He formed Malfunkshun in 1980 with his older brother Kevin Wood on guitar and Regan Hagar on drums. The band used alter ego personas onstage; Wood performed as Landrew the Love Child.

Though the band only released two songs before going on an extended hiatus, "With Yo' Heart (Not Yo' Hands)" and "Stars-n-You", on the Deep Six compilation album, they are often cited as being among the originators of the Seattle grunge movement. While in Malfunkshun, Wood started using drugs, entering rehab in 1985.

In 1988, Wood began jamming with Green River members Stone Gossard and Jeff Ament while Malfunkshun was on hiatus. They began writing original material and formed Mother Love Bone the same year, adding guitarist Bruce Fairweather (also a former member of Green River) and drummer Greg Gilmore to the lineup. In 1989, the band signed a deal with PolyGram issuing an EP, Shine, before going on tour, supporting The Dogs D'Amour. Near the end of the year, the band recorded their debut album, Apple, which was scheduled for release in 1990.

Struggling with drug dependence, Wood checked himself into rehab in 1989, hoping to get clean for the release of Mother Love Bone's debut album. He died in Seattle on March 19, 1990, at the age of 24, after being found in a comatose state by his girlfriend following a heroin overdose.

== Early life ==
While Wood was born in Columbus, Mississippi on January 8, 1966, to David C. Wood and Toni Wood, he grew up in Washington on Bainbridge Island, Washington. He was the youngest of three children; he had two older brothers, Kevin and Brian. Andrew and his brothers were exposed to various types of music by their parents, who also supported their children when they were learning how to play instruments. Andrew became a fan of acts including Elton John, Queen, Aerosmith, and Kiss.

== Career ==
=== Malfunkshun (1980–1988) ===
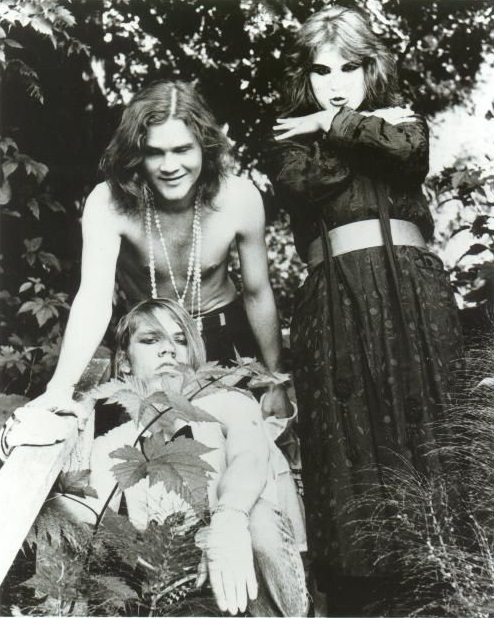
Wood (right) with Malfunkshun in a 1980s promo photo

In 1980, at the age of 14, Andrew Wood formed Malfunkshun with his brother Kevin, recording their first demo tape in April 1980. Drummer Regan Hagar joined the band soon afterwards, playing shows in Seattle. Each member adopted onstage alter egos, with Andrew becoming Landrew the Love Child, Kevin performing as Kevinstein, and Hagar becoming Thundarr. Unlike most grunge groups in Seattle, Malfunkshun were influenced by glam rock with Wood described as "a hippie, glammed-out rock and roll god, equal parts Marc Bolan and Jim Morrison," with his look and vocal style influenced by frontmen such as Freddie Mercury, Paul Stanley, and Marc Bolan. Andrew Wood developed a drug habit at a young age, having smoked marijuana and cigarettes when he was 11 or 12. By 1985, he began to rely heavily on drugs to cope with having a "rock star" persona; he entered rehab later that year.

Malfunkshun recorded a number of demos in 1986, two of which, "With Yo' Heart (Not Yo' Hands)" and "Stars-n-You," were included on the "legendary" Deep Six compilation album released by C/Z Records the same year. The band played shows in Seattle, opening for Soundgarden, The U-Men, and Skin Yard. However, in 1988, Malfunkshun disbanded.

Although the band never released an album during Wood's lifetime and were turned down by Sub Pop for "not [being] grunge enough," Malfunkshun, along with Green River, are often cited as an originator of the grunge movement.

=== Mother Love Bone and final years (1988–1990) ===
Wood and Hagar started playing with Stone Gossard and Jeff Ament of Green River, which disbanded in 1988, on occasion performing as the cover band Lords of the Wasteland. Former Green River guitarist Bruce Fairweather joined the lineup; former 10 Minute Warning and Skin Yard drummer Greg Gilmore replaced Hagar, forming Mother Love Bone in the same year.

The band soon signed a deal with PolyGram, and, through their own subsidiary label Stardog released a six-song EP, Shine, in 1989. John Book, of Allmusic, stated that the EP "contributed to the buzz about the Seattle music scene." The rest of the year the band toured, including shows supporting The Dogs D'Amour; they also recorded their debut album.

With high expectations for the album, Wood checked himself into rehab for heroin addiction, hoping to get clean before the album was released. In 1990, the band continued to play shows in Seattle, waiting for the release of their album, Apple. Wood died weeks before the release of the record.

== Death ==
On March 16, 1990, Wood was found in a comatose state by his fiancée Xana Lafuente, having overdosed on heroin. He was taken to Harborview Medical Center and placed on life support. On March 19, physicians suggested that Wood be removed from life support and he was pronounced dead at 3:15 pm that day. The official cause of death recorded on Wood's death certificate is hypoxic encephalopathy.

Apple was released posthumously later in the year, receiving positive reviews. David Browne of The New York Times wrote that "Apple may be one of the first great hard-rock records of the 90s" and that "Andrew Wood could have been the first of the big-league Seattle rock stars."

== Legacy ==
Shortly after Wood's death, former roommate and friend Chris Cornell of Soundgarden wrote two songs, "Reach Down" and "Say Hello 2 Heaven", as a tribute to him. Cornell approached Gossard and Ament about releasing the songs as singles before collaborating on an album. Adding drummer Matt Cameron, future Pearl Jam lead guitarist Mike McCready, and future Pearl Jam lead singer Eddie Vedder, they formed Temple of the Dog in 1990 to pay tribute to Wood, releasing a band-titled album in 1991.

Fellow Seattle band Alice in Chains dedicated their debut album Facelift to Wood. The song "Would?", included in their second album Dirt and on the soundtrack to the film Singles (1992), was written as an ode to Wood. In the liner notes of Alice in Chains' Music Bank box set collection, Jerry Cantrell said of the song:

I was thinking a lot about Andrew Wood at the time. We always had a great time when we did hang out, much like Chris Cornell and I do. There was never really a serious moment or conversation, it was all fun. Andy was a hilarious guy, full of life and it was really sad to lose him. But I always hate people who judge the decisions others make. So it was also directed towards people who pass judgments.

In 1992, PolyGram reissued both Shine and Apple as the compilation album Mother Love Bone, while the song "Chloe Dancer/Crown of Thorns" was included on the soundtrack to the film Singles. The same year, Los Angeles band Faster Pussycat wrote the song "Mr. Lovedog", from the album Whipped!, in tribute to Wood. Bradley Torreano of Allmusic stated that the song "offered a sad elegy to another charismatic figure in the metal world."

The Seattle rock band War Babies, which briefly featured Mother Love Bone's Jeff Ament on bass, dedicated the song "Blue Tomorrow" off their eponymous 1992 debut album to Wood. In 1993, Seattle grunge band Candlebox released their self-titled debut featuring the single "Far Behind", which was written in Wood's memory.

Wood's former bandmate Stone Gossard compiled Malfunkshun recordings from 1986 to 1987 and released a studio album Return to Olympus with the songs through his Loosegroove Records label in 1995. In 2005, director Scot Barbour completed production on the documentary Malfunkshun: The Andrew Wood Story.

The film is about Wood's music career as well as his family background. It premiered at the Seattle International Film Festival. In October of the same year, the film was screened at the FAIF Film Festival in Hollywood, California. The film was released in 2011 on DVD as part of a 2CD+DVD set entitled "Malfunkshun: The Andrew Wood Story" including the Return to Olympus album, a bonus CD including many interviews and demos, and the movie on the DVD disc.

In 2011, the album Melodies & Dreams was released. It featured unreleased songs and demos which Wood had recorded throughout his life, including a song that he recorded with Chris Cornell, "Island of Summer", "Island of Summer" is the only existing recording which has both of them singing together. Wood is featured in the 2011 documentary Pearl Jam Twenty; it is about the story of Pearl Jam. Friends including Chris Cornell, Jeff Ament and Stone Gossard talk about Wood in the film and home-made footage featuring Wood is shown.

== Discography ==
Title	Release	Label	Band
Shine	1989	Stardog/Mercury	Mother Love Bone
Apple	1990	Stardog/Mercury	Mother Love Bone
Mother Love Bone	1992	Stardog/Mercury	Mother Love Bone
Return to Olympus	1995	Loosegroove	Malfunkshun

=== Other appearances ===
Year	Album details	Band	Notes
1986	Deep Six: Released: March 1986; Label: C/Z Records	Various Artists	Compilation album; two songs by Malfunkshun.
1989	Another Pyrrhic Victory: Released: 1989; Label: C/Z Records	Various Artists	Compilation album; two songs by Malfunkshun.

== Videography ==
Year	Video details	US peak chart position	Band
1993	The Love Bone Earth Affair: Released: 1993; Label: PolyGram; Format: VHS	13	Mother Love Bone
