= 10 Minute Warning =

American punk band

- Promotional image of 10 Minute Warning. From left to right: Chrisopher Blue, Duff McKagan, Greg Gilmore, David Garrigues, Paul Solger

Background information
- Also known as: Ten Minute Warning
- Origin: Seattle, Washington, U.S.
- Genres: Punk rock, hardcore punk, grunge
- Years active: 1982–1984, 1997–1998
- Label: Sub Pop
- Past members: Steve Verwolf; Chrisopher Blue; Paul Solger; Duff McKagan; Greg Gilmore; David Garrigues; Daniel House; Jim Lightfoot

10 Minute Warning (also known as Ten Minute Warning) was a band from Seattle, Washington. They became famous locally as one of the first bands to adapt the popular punk sound to something slower and heavier, paving the way for grunge bands like Green River and Mother Love Bone before breaking up in 1984.

== History ==
=== Early years (1982–1983) ===
The group was formed in 1982 by The Fartz members Paul Solger and Duff McKagan (also of the Fastbacks). Filling out the band's line-up were vocalist Steve Verwolf, bassist David Garrigues, and future Mother Love Bone drummer, Greg Gilmore. Garrigues left the band in 1983 due to personality clashes. McKagan took over duties on bass for a single 8-track recording of Necropolitan Affair and subsequently left the band in 1984. Jim Lightfoot (former partner in Modern Productions and member of Memory) joined as bass player, but stayed only for a single performance. The final pre-Sub Pop line up was cemented by the addition of Daniel House on bass.

Despite criticism from the punk rock purists of the area, the band's performances are generally regarded as legendary; there were hints of psychedelic elements which caused Black Flag's Henry Rollins to label them the "punk rock Hawkwind". Pearl Jam's Stone Gossard has credited them as the band that inspired him to learn guitar. It is perhaps not surprising then that the first of Gossard's bands to gain recognition - Green River - used the same grinding, slowed-down, punk rock riffage.

10 Minute Warning made numerous attempts at recording, most notably with Jello Biafra's Alternative Tentacles label and in 1984 they recorded what was to be their first album. This effort included the songs "Last Dream", "Again", "Life", "Stooge", "Necropolitan Affair", "Echoes", "Disraeli", "Heaven", "Woke Up Dreaming" and "Memories Gather Dust". They also recorded a version of Pink Floyd's "The Nile Song", but the album was never released. At the time the Seattle music industry was still young, and the indie labels which helped propel bands from that area into stardom in later years had yet to come into fruition. It is for this reason that Ten Minute Warning never released any recorded material before they split in 1984. This left groups such as Green River and Soundgarden to become known as the founders of what later became known as grunge.

=== Breakup (1984) ===
The band played a farewell performance at the Lincoln Arts Center in Seattle in 1984. Solger left for New York with The Fags. He also later played in a band called Meddaphysical. Verwolf went to San Francisco in the hopes of securing a gig singing for The Black Athletes; he returned to Seattle after two weeks and fell back into a drug habit that caused him to move on from the music scene. Verwolf returned to music in 1991 when he teamed up briefly with Steve Weid (Tad) and Scott Wade (Sledge) in an early version of Foil. McKagan and Gilmore moved to Los Angeles. Gilmore quickly became disillusioned with the LA scene and returned to Seattle and eventually joined Mother Love Bone. McKagan remained in LA and joined Guns N' Roses.

=== Reunion (1997–1998) ===
McKagan left Guns N' Roses in 1997 and moved back to Seattle; he reconnected with many old friends, including Stone Gossard. With Gossard's encouragement, the band reunited that year with new vocalist Chrisopher Blue; Steve Verwolf was serving a term in Federal Prison and was, therefore, unavailable. It was at this time that the band finally recorded a self-titled album on well known Seattle label Sub Pop. It contained nine tracks, including two new versions of songs originally recorded by The Fartz ("Is This The Way?" and "Buried") and the original version of "Mezz" (which was later re-recorded for McKagan's unreleased solo album, Beautiful Disease).

The album was eventually released in 1998. By this time, Paul Solger had quit due to "musical differences". Ten Minute Warning played its last show on August 22, 1998 at the Roseland theater in Portland, Oregon. Since then, McKagan has reunited with his former Guns N' Roses bandmates Slash and Matt Sorum to form Velvet Revolver, and Paul Solger was diagnosed with and successfully treated for cancer in 2004. As of 2008, he resides in Eastern Washington with his parents. Steve Verwolf died of a heroin overdose in August 2008. Only a month before he died, Verwolf made a deal with Jason Potbelly of Northwest hardcore punk icons Potbelly to do a split 7-inch titled "Then and Now"; this release would showcase an unreleased track recorded in 1983 on the 10 Minute Warning side and a classic Potbelly track on the other. The limited pressing 7-inch was released the day of Verwolf's funeral. Potbelly attended Verwolf's funeral and presented his family copies of the record.

== Members ==
=== Final line-up ===
- Duff McKagan – rhythm guitar (1982–1984, 1997–1998), lead guitar (1998)
- David Garrigues – bass (1982–1983, 1997–1998)
- Greg Gilmore – drums, percussion (1982–1984, 1997–1998)
- Chrisopher Blue – vocals (1997–1998)

=== Previous members ===
- Paul Solger – lead guitar (1982–1984, 1997–1998)
- Blaine Cook - vocals (1982)
- Steve Verwolf – vocals (1982–1984)
- Jim Lightfoot – bass (1983)
- Daniel House – bass (1984)

== Discography ==
=== Albums ===
Year	Title	Track listing	Lineup	Notes
1998	10 Minute Warning: May 5, 1998; Sub Pop	1. "Swollen Rage" – 3:22; 2. "Buried" – 3:54; 3. "Face First" – 4:36; 4. "Mezz" – 5:23; 5. "Disconnected" – 4:16; 6. "Erthe" – 4:42; 7. "No More Time" – 3:34; 8. "Is This The Way?" – 2:27; 9. "Pictures" – 6:32	Chrisopher Blue: vocals; Duff McKagan: rhythm guitar; Paul Solger: lead guitar; David Garrigues: bass; Greg Gilmore: drums	Production: Recorded by Hal Ermine at AVAST!; Mixed by Jack Endino at Hanszek Audio.
2021	This Could be Heaven - The Lost 1984 Recordings: November 12, 2021; C/Z Records	1. "Stooge" – 3:12; 2. "Lights" – 3:32; 3. "The Nile Song" – 4:40; 4. "Echoes" – 4:05; 5. "Woke Up Dreaming " – 3:32; 6. "Last Dream " – 6:37; 7. "Necropolitan Affair " – 2:59; 8. "Disraeli" – 4:36; 9. "(This Could be) Heaven " – 6:36; 10. Again (bonus download-only track, not on LP.)	Steve Verwolf: vocals; Paul Solger: guitar; Daniel House: bass; Greg Gilmore: drums	Production: Produced by Harry Kool and 10 Minute Warning; Recorded by Harry Kool at Star Trak and Crow Recording, Seattle in March - September 1984; Additional vocal and bass overdubs recorded by Jack Endino at Reciprocal, Seattle in 1991; Remixed and mastered by Jack Endino in 2020 and 2021.

=== EP ===
Year	Title	Track listing	Notes
1983	Survival of the Fittest	1. "Buried Alive"; 2. "Dead Solger"; 3. "Is This the Way It's Gotta Be"; 4. "Judgement Day"; 5. "Resistance"	released on cassette Lineup: Blaine Cook: vocals; Duff McKagan: rhythm guitar; Paul Solger: lead guitar; David Garrigues: bass; Greg Gilmore: drums

== Other sources ==
- Raw Power (Duff McKagan's Official Fan Club) Magazine Issue 4 (August 1998)
