= Google Play Music =

Online music service, 2011–2020

- Developer: Google
- Type: Music and video streaming
- Launched: November 16, 2011; 14 years ago
- Discontinued: December 3, 2020; 5 years ago
- Platforms: Android, Android TV, iOS, web browser, Wear OS
- Status: Defunct

Google Play Music was a music and podcast streaming service and an online music locker operated by Google as part of its Google Play line of services. The service was announced on May 10, 2011; after a six-month, invitation-only beta period, it was publicly launched on November 16, 2011, and shut down in December 2020 after being replaced by YouTube Music.

Users with standard accounts could store up to 50,000 songs from their personal libraries at no cost. A paid All Access subscription, introduced in 2013, allowed users to on-demand stream any song in the Google Play Music catalog. Podcasts were later included in the catalog in 2016. Also, users could purchase additional tracks from the music store section of Google Play. Google Play Music mobile apps also supported offline playback of tracks stored on the device.

== Features ==
=== Standard accounts ===
Google Play Music offered all users storage of up to 50,000 files for free. Users could listen to songs through the service's web player and mobile apps. The service scanned the user's collection and matched the files to tracks in Google's catalog, which could then be streamed or downloaded in up to 320 kbit/s quality. Any files that were not matched were uploaded to Google's servers for streaming or re-download. Songs purchased through the Google Play Store did not count against the 50,000-song upload limit.

Supported file formats for upload included: MP3, AAC, WMA, FLAC, Ogg, or ALAC. Non-MP3 uploads would be converted to MP3. Files could be up to 300 MB after conversion.

Songs could be downloaded on the mobile apps for offline playback, and on computers through the Music Manager app.

Standard users located in the United States, Canada, and India could also listen to curated radio stations, supported by video and banner advertisements. Stations were based on "an activity, your mood, or your favorite popular music". Up to six songs per hour could be skipped when listening to curated radio.

Podcasts were also available for free to listen to for standard users in the US and Canada.

=== Premium accounts ===
A paid subscription to Google Play Music allowed users to receive access to on-demand streaming of 40 million songs, offline music playback on the mobile apps, and no advertisements during listening with no limit on the number of track skips. A one-time 30-day free trial for a subscription to Google Play Music was offered for new users. Paid subscribers also received access to YouTube Premium (including YouTube Music) in eligible countries.

=== Platforms ===
On computers, music and podcasts could be listened to from a dedicated Google Play Music section of the Google Play website.

On smartphones and tablets, music could be listened to through the Google Play Music mobile app for the Android and iOS operating systems, while podcasts were only supported on Android. Up to five smartphones could be used to access the library in Google Play Music, and up to ten devices total. Listening was limited to one device at a time.

=== Samsung Galaxy S8 ===
In April 2017, reports surfaced that the default music player on the then-new Samsung Galaxy S8 would be Google Play Music, continuing a trend that started with the S7 in 2016. However, for the S8, Samsung partnered with Google to incorporate additional exclusive features into the app, including the ability to upload up to 100,000 tracks, an increase from the 50,000 tracks users are normally allowed to upload. Google also stated that it would develop other "special features in Google Play Music just for Samsung customers". In June, Google Play Music on the S8 was updated to exclusively feature "New Release Radio", a daily, personalized playlist of new music releases. In July, the playlist was made available to all users, with Google noting in a press release that the exclusivity on Samsung devices was part of an "early access program" for testing and feedback purposes.

== History ==
=== Introduction (2010–2011) ===
Google first hinted at releasing a cloud media player during their 2010 Google I/O developer conference, when Google's then-Senior Vice President of Social Vic Gundotra showed a "Music" section of the then-called Android Market during a presentation. A music service was officially announced at the following year's I/O conference on May 10, 2011, under the name "Music Beta". Initially, it was only available by invitation to residents of the United States, and had limited functionality; the service featured a no-cost "music locker" for storage of up to 20,000 songs, but no music store was present during the beta period, as Google was not yet able to reach licensing deals with major record labels.

After a six-month beta period, Google publicly launched the service in the US on November 16, 2011, as "Google Music" with its "These Go to Eleven" announcement event. The event introduced several features of the service, including a music store integrated into the then-named Android Market, music sharing via the Google+ social network, "Artist Hub" pages for musicians to self-publish music, and song purchasing reflected on T-Mobile phone bills. At launch, Google had partnerships with three major labels – Universal Music Group, EMI, and Sony Music Entertainment – along with other, smaller labels, although no agreement had been reached with Warner Music Group; in total, 13 million tracks were covered by these deals, 8 million of which were available for purchase on the launch date. To promote the launch, several artists released free songs and exclusive albums through the store; The Rolling Stones debuted the live recording Brussels Affair (Live 1973), and Pearl Jam released a live concert recorded in Toronto as 9.11.2011 Toronto, Canada.

=== Slow growth (2012–2017) ===
In January 2012, a feature was added to Google Music that allows users to download 320 kbit/s MP3 copies of any file in their library, with a two-download limit per track via the web, or unlimited downloads via the Music Manager app.

According to a February 2012 report from CNET, Google executives were displeased with Google Music's adoption rate and revenues in its first three months.

In March 2012, the company rebranded the Android Market and its digital content services as "Google Play"; the music service was renamed "Google Play Music".

Google announced in October 2012 that they had signed deals with Warner Music Group that would bring "their full music catalog" to the service.

At the Google I/O developer conference in May 2013, Google announced that Google Play Music would be expanded to include a paid on-demand music streaming service called "All Access", allowing users to stream any song in the Google Play catalog. It debuted immediately in the United States for $9.99 per month ($7.99 per month if the users signed up before June 30). The service allows users to combine the All Access catalog with their own library of songs.

Google Play Music was one of the first four apps compatible with Google's Chromecast digital media player that launched in July 2013.

In October 2014, a new "Listen Now" feature was introduced, providing contextual and curated recommendations and playlists. The feature was adapted from technology by Songza, which Google acquired earlier in the year.

On November 12, 2014, Google subsidiary YouTube announced "Music Key", a new premium service succeeding All Access that included the Google Play Music streaming service, along with advertising-free access to streaming music videos on YouTube. Additionally, aspects of the two platforms were integrated; Google Play Music recommendations and YouTube music videos are available across both services. The service was re-launched in a revised form as YouTube Red (now YouTube Premium) on October 28, 2015, expanding its scope to offer ad-free access to all YouTube videos, as opposed to just music videos, as well as premium content produced in collaboration with notable YouTube producers and personalities.

In December 2015, Google started offering a Google Play Music family plan, that allows unlimited access for up to six family members for US$14.99/month. Prior to the discontinuation of the service, the family plan was available in Australia, Belgium, Brazil, Canada, Chile, the Czech Republic, France, Germany, Ireland, Italy, Japan, Mexico, the Netherlands, New Zealand, Norway, Russia, South Africa, Spain, Ukraine, the United Kingdom, and the United States.

In April 2016, Google announced that podcasts would be coming to Google Play Music. Its first original podcast series, "City Soundtracks", was announced in March 2017, and would "feature interviews with various musicians about how their hometowns influenced their work, including the people and the moments that had an impact".

In November 2016, Google introduced the Google Home smart speaker system, with built-in support for Google Play Music.

=== Sunsetting (2018–2020) ===
In May 2018, YouTube announced a new version of the YouTube Music service, including a web-based desktop player and redesigned mobile app, more dynamic recommendations based on various factors, and use of Google artificial intelligence technology to search songs based on lyrics and descriptions. YouTube Music was provided to Google Play Music users as part of the YouTube Premium offering.

In June 2018, Google announced that YouTube Red would be replaced by YouTube Premium along with YouTube Music. As a result, users subscribed to Google Play Music in the United States, Australia, New Zealand and Mexico are now given access to YouTube Premium—which includes YouTube Music Premium. Users outside of those four countries are still required to pay the regular YouTube Premium price to access Premium features, but are given free access to YouTube Music Premium.

In June 2018, Google announced plans to shut down Play Music and offer subscribers to migrate to YouTube Music. Since May 2020, users are able to move their music collections, personal taste preferences and playlists to YouTube Music and their podcast history, subscriptions to Google Podcasts (now defunct).

In August 2020, Google announced a detailed shutdown timeline starting in late August and ending with complete data deletion in December. By late August the Music Manager no longer supported uploading or downloading music. By September, Google Play Music was no longer available in New Zealand and South Africa, and by October, music streaming started shutting down for some users internationally on the web and the app. The music store was made unavailable in October 2020 and finally all usage of the service was discontinued in December 2020 and was replaced by YouTube Music and (now defunct) Google Podcasts.

== Geographic availability ==
Countries where Google Play Music was available to purchase (All Access) 2020.

Standard accounts on Google Play Music was available in 63 countries before the discontinuation of the service. The full list included: Argentina, Australia, Austria, Belarus, Belgium, Bolivia, Bosnia and Herzegovina, Brazil, Bulgaria, Canada, Chile, Colombia, Costa Rica, Croatia, Cyprus, Czech Republic, Denmark, Dominican Republic, Ecuador, El Salvador, Estonia, Finland, France, Germany, Greece, Guatemala, Honduras, Hungary, Iceland, India, Ireland, Italy, Japan, Latvia, Liechtenstein, Lithuania, Luxembourg, North Macedonia, Malta, Mexico, Netherlands, New Zealand, Nicaragua, Norway, Panama, Paraguay, Peru, Poland, Portugal, Romania, Russia, Serbia, Slovakia, Slovenia, South Africa, Spain, Sweden, Switzerland, Tunisia, Ukraine, United Kingdom, United States, Uruguay, and Venezuela.

Premium subscriptions are available in the same countries as Standard accounts.

Availability of music was introduced in the United Kingdom, France, Germany, Italy, and Spain in October 2012, Czech Republic, Finland, Hungary, Liechtenstein, Netherlands, Russia, and Switzerland in September 2013, Mexico in October 2013, Germany in December 2013, Greece, Norway, Sweden, and Slovakia in March 2014, Canada, Poland and Denmark in May 2014, Bolivia, Chile, Colombia, Costa Rica, Peru, and Ukraine in July 2014, Dominican Republic, Ecuador, Guatemala, Honduras, Nicaragua, Panama, Paraguay, El Salvador, and Venezuela in August 2014, Brazil and Uruguay in September 2014, 13 new countries in November 2014, Brazil in November 2014, Argentina in June 2015, Japan in September 2015, South Africa and Serbia in December 2015, and India in September 2016, where only purchasing of music was offered. The All Access subscription service launched in India in April 2017.

== Reception ==
In 2013, Entertainment Weekly compared a number of music services and gave Google Play Music All Access a "B+" score, writing, "The addition of uploading to augment the huge streaming archive fills in some huge gaps."
