= London Bridge Studio =

American recording studio

Coordinates: 47.7743°N 122.3106°W

- Genre: Rock, grunge, post-grunge
- Founded: 1985
- Founder: Rick Parashar, Raj Parashar
- Headquarters: Shoreline, Washington, U.S.
- Services: Recording studio
- Owner: Geoff Ott, Jonathan Plum, Eric Lilavois
- Website: London Bridge Studio Official site

London Bridge Studio is a recording studio near Seattle that has hosted and recorded many influential artists, producers and engineers since 1985. Founded by brothers Rick and Raj Parashar and now currently owned by producers Geoff Ott, Jonathan Plum, and Eric Lilavois. The space was designed by notable studio designer Geoff Turner (Little Mountain Studios, Pinewood Studios) and features 5,000 square feet (460 m^{2}) of tall ceilings, hardwood floors, brick walls and live acoustics. Layout of the studio includes live rooms, a control room, overdub suites, and a lounge with full kitchen.

== History ==
Seattle's surge to musical prominence in the late 1980s and 1990s stemmed largely in part from albums recorded at London Bridge Studio. Bands of that era, such as Mother Love Bone, Temple of the Dog, Alice in Chains, Soundgarden and Pearl Jam, launched the studio into international notoriety. London Bridge continues to be a destination for artists of all genres.

The studio's iconic Neve 8048 console has been maintained and restored, alongside an added SSL AWS console, an expansive mic locker and outboard gear collection. London Bridge has also expanded into orchestral, video game and television audio recordings.

== Recorded albums and artists ==
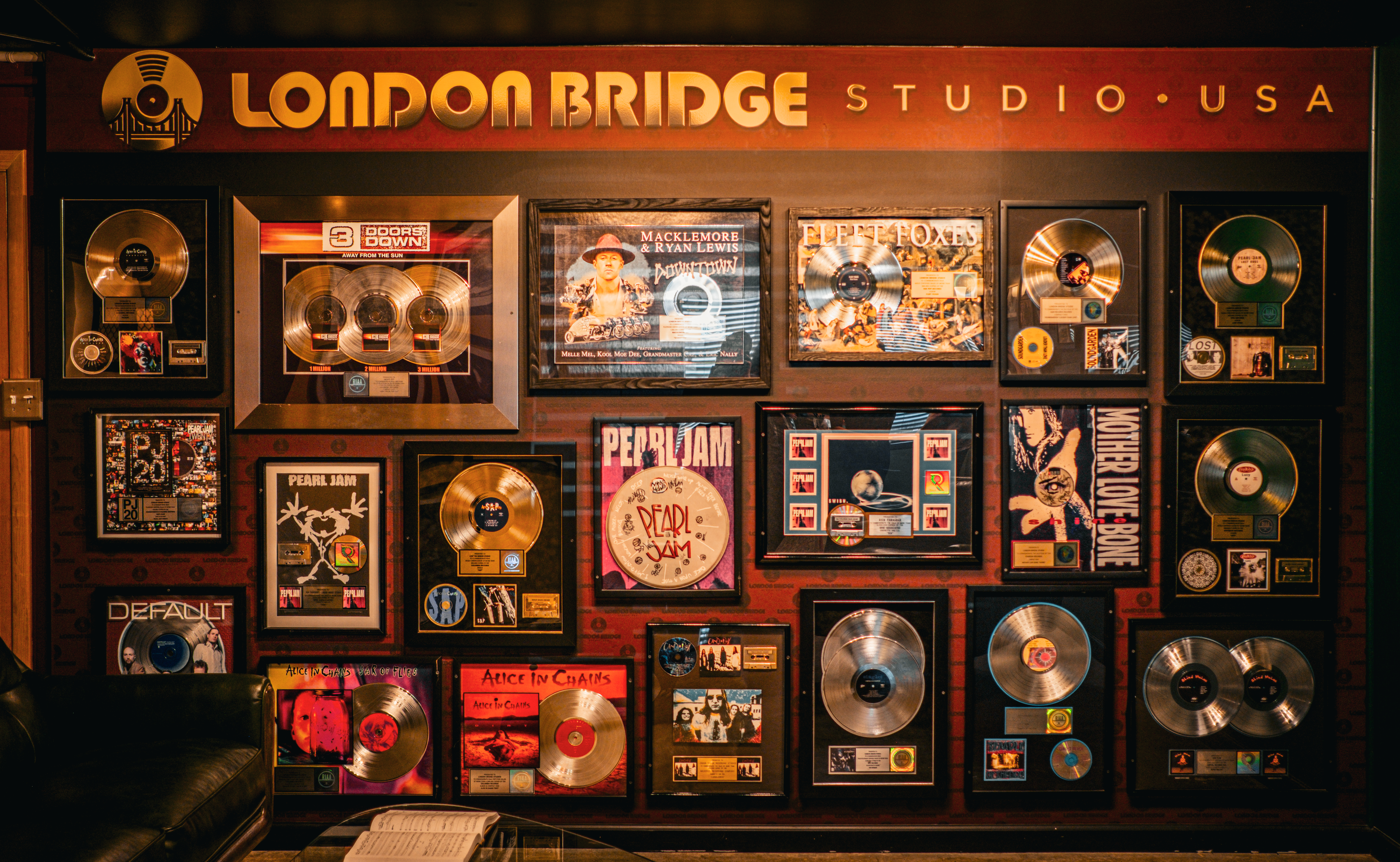
London Bridge Studio in Seattle, Washington.

- Alice N' Chains – Demo #1 (1987)
- Eternal Daze – Escapade (1987)
- Mother Love Bone – Shine EP (1989)
- Forced Entry – Uncertain Future (1989)
- Soundgarden – Louder Than Love (1989)
- Mother Love Bone – Apple (1990)
- Alice in Chains – Facelift (1990)
- Screaming Trees – Uncle Anesthesia (1991)
- Temple of the Dog – Temple of the Dog (1991)
- Pearl Jam – Ten (1991)
- Alice in Chains – Sap (1992)
- Singles: Original Motion Picture Soundtrack (1992)
- Blind Melon – Blind Melon (1992)
- Alice in Chains – Dirt (1992) (Dirt was recorded at One on one and Eldorado - only Would was recorded at London Bridge)
- Candlebox – Candlebox (1993)
- Hammerbox – Numb (1993)
- Alice in Chains – Jar of Flies (1994)
- Zakk Wylde – Pride & Glory (1994)
- Sven Gali (1994)
- Redbelly (1994)
- Litfiba – Spirito (1994)
- Into Another (1995)
- Candlebox – Lucy (1995)
- Chimestone
- Working Class Hero: A Tribute to John Lennon (1995)
- Unfortunate Bangs - American Girl (2020)
- Super 8 – Super 8 (1996)
- Mollies Revenge – Every Dirty Word (1997)
- Unwritten Law – Unwritten Law (1998)
- Queensrÿche – Q2K (1999)
- U.P.O. – No Pleasantries (2000)
- Stereomud – Perfect Self (2001)
- Anyone – Anyone (2001)
- Epidemic – Epidemic (2002)
- 3 Doors Down – Away from the Sun (2002)
- Melissa Etheridge (2004)
- Longview (2005)
- Alex Lloyd (2005)
- Seeing Blind – Urgency (2006)
- Wolves in the Throne Room – Two Hunters (2007)
- 3 Inches of Blood (2007)
- Blake Lewis (2007)
- Ruth (2007)
- MxPx – Secret Weapon (2007)
- OneRepublic (2007)
- Anberlin (2007)
- Local H (2007)
- Radiocraft – Catch Your Death (2007)
- 10 Years (2008)
- Ivoryline (2008)
- The Myriad (2008)
- Brandi Carlile (2008)
- The Moog – Razzmatazz Orfeum (2009)
- Queensrÿche – American Soldier (2009)
- Saving Arcadia – "Saving Arcadia" (2009)
- A Hope Not Forgotten (2010)
- Queensrÿche – Dedicated to Chaos (2011)
- The Jane Austen Argument – "Somewhere Under the Rainbow" (2012)
- Candlebox – Love Stories & Other Musings (2012)
- Queensrÿche – Queensryche (2013)
- Megs McLean– "It's My Truck" (2015)
- Potty Mouth – Potty Mouth (2015)
- Lights Out – Thrilling Detail (2019)
- The Pretty Reckless – Death by Rock and Roll (2021)
- Sunny Day Real Estate - Diary – Live at London Bridge Studio (2024)
