= Mother Love Bone =

American rock band

- Mother Love Bone in 1989; clockwise from left: Bruce Fairweather, Stone Gossard, Greg Gilmore, Jeff Ament, and Andrew Wood

Background information
- Also known as: Lords of the Wasteland (1987–1988)
- Origin: Seattle, Washington, U.S.
- Genres: Grunge; alternative rock; hard rock; alternative metal; glam rock
- Years active: 1987–1990, partial reunions: 2010, 2018
- Labels: Stardog; PolyGram; Polydor; Mercury
- Spinoffs: Temple of the Dog; Pearl Jam
- Spinoff of: Malfunkshun; Green River
- Past members: Jeff Ament; Bruce Fairweather; Greg Gilmore; Stone Gossard; Andrew Wood; Regan Hagar

Mother Love Bone was an American rock band that formed in Seattle, Washington, in 1987. The band was active up until 1990. Frontman Andrew Wood's charisma and songwriting helped to catapult the group to the top of the burgeoning Seattle music scene at the time. Mother Love Bone ultimately became the first of the grunge-adjacent bands to sign with a major label (PolyGram). Their debut EP, Shine, was released in late 1989. Wood died in March 1990, shortly before the scheduled release of the band's full-length debut album Apple, resulting in the breakup of the band. The album was eventually released a few months later and many releases of demos, b-sides, and live performances have been issued in the years since.

As well as being influential to grunge, they are also considered early pioneers in the alternative metal genre. After Wood's death, the band's remaining members scattered to other projects, with guitarist Stone Gossard and bassist Jeff Ament forming Pearl Jam as the most notable example.

== History ==
Mother Love Bone was established in 1987 by ex-Green River members Jeff Ament (bass) and Stone Gossard (guitars), in addition to ex-Malfunkshun members Andrew Wood (vocals) and Regan Hagar (drums). The group was formed in 1987 out of the cover band Lords of the Wasteland which featured Wood, Gossard, Ament, and Hagar. By early 1988, the band added another ex-Green River member to the lineup, Bruce Fairweather (guitars). Around the same time, Hagar was replaced on drums by ex-Ten Minute Warning member Greg Gilmore; thus, the band changed their name to Mother Love Bone.

The stabilized lineup quickly set about recording and playing shows, and by late 1988 had become one of Seattle's more promising bands. Wood's exuberant on-stage personality, outlandish clothes, and dreamy lyrics helped bring attention to the band. Years later in the 1996 grunge documentary Hype!, Seattle engineer Jack Endino called Wood "the only stand-up comedian frontman in Seattle", a reference to Wood's playful style of interacting with fans.

From May 1988 the band were pursued by various major labels, including Capitol, Atlantic, Geffen, and A&M, with Geffen being the frontrunner to sign the band by July 1988. However, the band eventually signed to the PolyGram subsidiary Polydor in November 1988, and recorded their debut EP. As part of their contract, PolyGram created the Stardog Records imprint exclusively for the band. In March 1989, the group issued its debut EP Shine, becoming the first of the new crop of Seattle bands to have a release on a major label. The record sold well and rapidly increased the profile of the band. It was stated that "the record contributed to the buzz about the Seattle music scene."

In late 1989 the band entered a studio in Sausalito, California to record their debut album Apple. Despite some initial difficulties, the record was on time for its projected March 1990 release. Only days before Apple was slated to be released, Wood, who had a long history with drug problems, overdosed on heroin. Unresponsive and without signs of brain activity, he was in the hospital on life support for two days to allow friends and family to say goodbye. Wood's death effectively brought the group to an end. The album would see release later that year on July 19, 1990. Kim Neely of Rolling Stone said that the album "succeeds where countless other hard rock albums have failed, capturing the essence of what made Zep immortal – dynamics, kids! – and giving it a unique Nineties spin." Apple eventually peaked at No. 34 on Billboard's Top Heatseekers chart in 1992.

== Post-Mother Love Bone ==
In the months following Wood's death, Gossard and Ament were approached by Soundgarden frontman Chris Cornell (who had been Wood's roommate), and asked if they would be interested in recording a single containing two songs he had written in tribute to Wood. The project turned into an entire album and the group took the name Temple of the Dog, a reference to a line in the Mother Love Bone song "Man of Golden Words". Eddie Vedder later joined Mike McCready, Dave Krusen, Gossard, and Ament to form Pearl Jam. Pearl Jam subsequently became one of the most commercially successful and critically acclaimed rock bands of the 1990s.

Fairweather initially remained inactive but later joined Seattle based psychedelic rock band Love Battery, replacing Tommy Simpson on bass in 1992. He played on three of the band's albums and numerous tours before leaving the band. In 2006 he resurfaced in The Press Corps, with Garrett Shavlik (The Fluid) and Dan Peters (Mudhoney).

Gilmore's profile dropped significantly following Mother Love Bone's demise. Between 1992 and 1994, he drummed with the band Chubby Children, reuniting with former bandmates from 1982 to 1985 (Brian Fox and Garth Brandenburg). Out of the band came a handful of shows and unreleased recordings. He also participated in the reunion of his former band Ten Minute Warning in 1998, and was credited with providing "inspiration" for the song "Never the Machine Forever" (credited as being written by Kim Thayil) on Soundgarden's studio album Down on the Upside (1996). The song initially came out of a jam session Thayil had with Gilmore.

In 1994, Hagar and Gossard co-founded the independent label Loosegroove Records together. The label closed in 2000 and its catalog was sold to Lakeshore Entertainment, although Hagar and Gossard resurrected the Loosegroove name in 2020. Hagar performed in the bands Satchel and Brad during the 1990s. He eventually focused on becoming a graphic designer.

In April 2011, Kevin Wood (Andrew Wood's brother) teamed up with hard rock band Lace Weeper to record Mother Love Bone's "Crown of Thorns" in commemoration of 21 years since Andrew's death. The single was released on Kevin's Wammybox Records.

== Reunion concerts ==
On April 14, 2010, the four surviving members of Mother Love Bone reunited for the first time in 20 years (with friend and fellow Seattle musician Shawn Smith serving as frontman) as part of a sold-out "Brad and Friends" evening at Seattle's Showbox. The songs featured were part of the band's core repertoire from their early days, including "Stardog Champion", "Holy Roller", "Gentle Groove", and a cover of the Argent song "Hold Your Head Up", a favorite encore from the band's early club days around Seattle.

On May 5, 2018, the band again got together and performed 14 songs (including "Hold Your Head Up") during the event at Seattle’s Neptune Theatre. Smith once again provided vocals, along with Ohm Johari (Hell’s Belles).

== Influences ==
Mother Love Bone cited influences including Kiss, Queen, Elton John, the Cult, the Melvins, the Stooges, Black Sabbath, Guns N' Roses, Aerosmith, Deep Purple, Led Zeppelin, T. Rex, the Doors and the Velvet Underground.

== Members ==
- Andrew Wood – lead vocals, piano, keyboards, percussion (1987–1990; died 1990)
- Bruce Fairweather – guitar, backing vocals (1987–1990)
- Stone Gossard – guitar, backing vocals (1987–1990)
- Jeff Ament – bass, backing vocals (1987–1990)
- Regan Hagar – drums (1987–1988)
- Greg Gilmore – drums (1988–1990)

== Discography ==
=== Studio albums ===
Year	Album details
1990	Apple: Released: August 14, 1990; Label: Stardog/Mercury; Format: CD, cassette (CS), LP

=== Compilations ===
Title	Album details	US peak chart position
Mother Love Bone	Released: September 22, 1992; Label: Stardog/Mercury; Format: CD, CS	77
On Earth As It Is – The Complete Works	Released: November 4, 2016; Label: Monkeywrench; Format: CD, DVD, LP	—
"—" denotes a recording that did not chart or was not released in that territory

=== Extended plays ===
Year	Album details
1989	Shine: Released: March 20, 1989; Label: Stardog/Mercury; Format: CD, CS, LP

=== Singles ===
Year	Single	Album
1989	"Hold Your Head Up" (cover of Argent) / "Lady Godiva Blues" / "Man of Golden Words" (alternative version)	N/A (unofficial blue vinyl 7" single)
1990	"Stardog Champion"	Apple
1990	"This Is Shangrila"	Apple
1990	"Stargazer"	Apple
1992	"Stardog Champion"	Mother Love Bone
1992	"Capricorn Sister"	Mother Love Bone
2014	"Hold Your Head Up" (cover of Argent) / "Holy Roller" (alternative version)	N/A (Black Friday Record Store release 7" single)

=== Videos ===
Year	Video details	US peak chart position
1993	The Love Bone Earth Affair: Released: 1993; Label: PolyGram; Format: VHS	13

=== Music videos ===
- 1990: "Stardog Champion"
- 1990: "Holy Roller"
