= Greg Gilmore =

American drummer

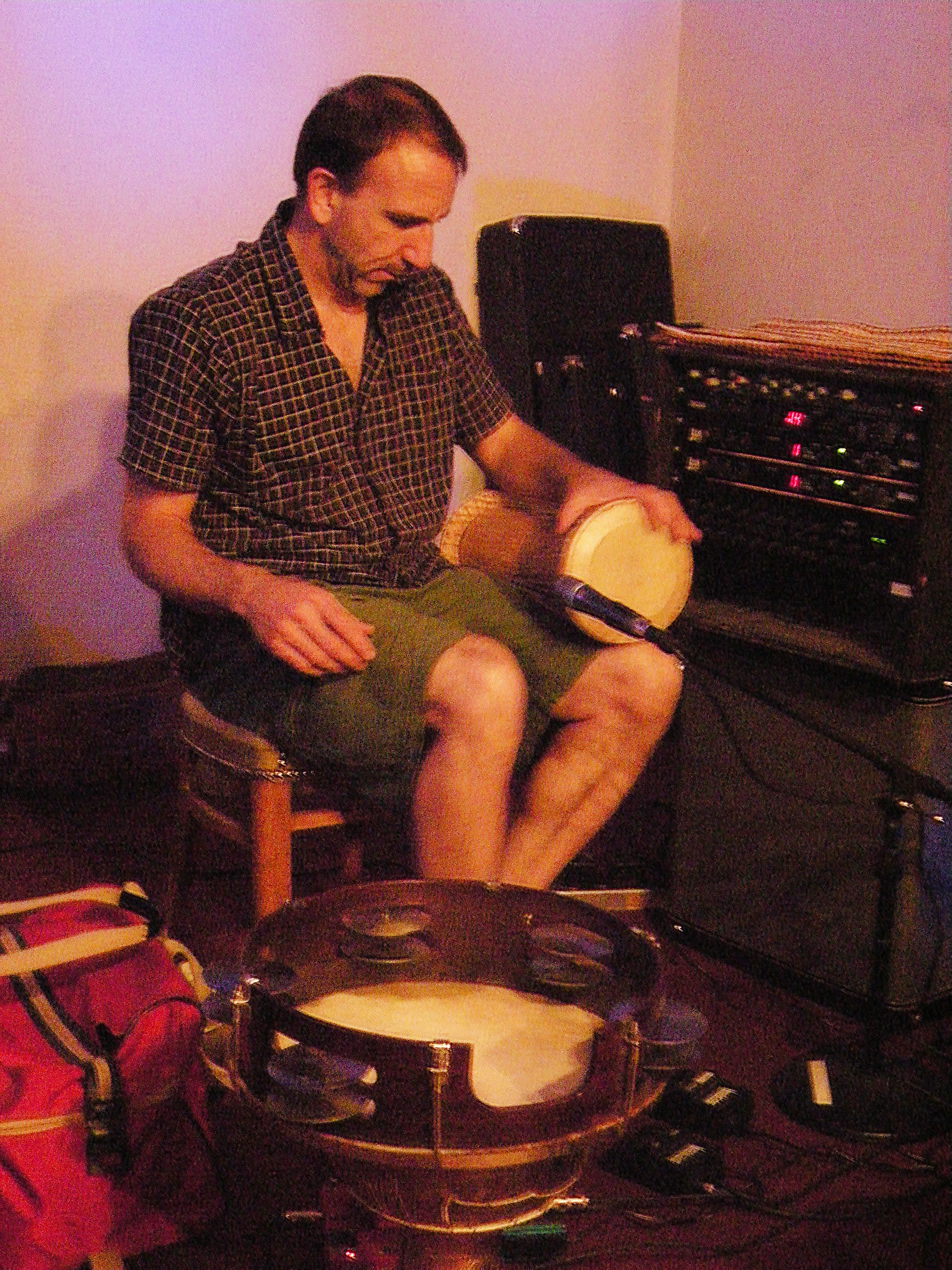
- Gilmore setting up to perform with Steve Fisk and Peter Randlette (not shown) at the 14th Olympia Experimental Music Festival, 2008

Background information
- Born: January 3, 1962 (age 64); France
- Origin: Seattle, Washington, U.S.
- Genres: Rock; punk rock; grunge
- Occupation: Drummer
- Labels: First World Music

Greg Gilmore (born January 3, 1962) is a French born-American drummer in Seattle, Washington, and co-founder of the recording label First World Music. He was a member of various Seattle area bands, such as 10 Minute Warning, Skin Yard, Mother Love Bone, and Land.

== Biography ==
Although born in France, Gilmore grew up in the Seattle area. After playing in 10 Minute Warning with Duff McKagan (The Fartz, Guns N' Roses), Steve Verwolf, Paul Solger, Bob Groves, and David Garrigues, Gilmore decided to join his friend Duff McKagan when he announced he was leaving Seattle for a new life in L.A, and accompanied him in his early auditions. Shortly after the success of Guns N' Roses, he moved back to Seattle and in the late 1980s Gilmore was a member of the critically acclaimed, seminal Seattle band Mother Love Bone along with bandmates Andrew Wood (vocals), Bruce Fairweather (guitar), Jeff Ament (bass), and Stone Gossard (guitar). After Wood's death from a heroin overdose, Ament and Gossard went on to play key roles in Pearl Jam.

Gilmore went on to collaborate with Seattle engineer and producer Jack Endino, with whom he would release Angle of Attack (1990) and Endino's Earthworm (1992). In the ensuing years, Gilmore would collaborate with a wide variety of musicians on releases such as: Land's Archipelago (1997) and Doghead's eponymous 1996 release. In the liner notes of Down on the Upside (1996), Soundgarden guitarist Kim Thayil credits Gilmore with "inspiration" for the song "Never the Machine Forever".

1999 saw the release of the eponymous debut album by Radio Chongqing, which Gilmore recorded with bandmates Lesli Dalaba (trumpet) and George Soler (stick).

As of 2007 he has been playing with Steve Fisk and working on several other recording projects.

== Discography ==
Studio albums

- Apple by Mother Love Bone (1990)
- Archipelago by Land (1997)
- 10 Minute Warning by 10 Minute Warning (1998)
