= Bruce Fairweather =

American guitarist (born 1960)

- Born: December 12, 1960 (age 64)
- Genres: Grunge; alternative rock; hard rock; glam rock; psychedelic rock
- Occupation: Musician
- Instruments: Guitar; bass

Bruce Ian Fairweather (born December 12, 1960) is an American guitarist and bassist based in Seattle, Washington.

== Biography ==
Fairweather grew up in Hawaii and moved to Montana for college where he met Jeff Ament skateboarding the brick banks at the University of Montana in September 1981. A month after they were rehearsing as Deranged Diction. In May 1983 they moved to Seattle and disbanded in 1984. In 1985, he replaced Steve Turner in the grunge band Green River, which included Mark Arm (later of Mudhoney), Alex Vincent as well as Jeff Ament and Stone Gossard, later of Pearl Jam.

In 1988, shortly after the release of the band's mini album Rehab Doll, Green River disbanded over band disputes. Singer Mark Arm reunited with Turner (whom Fairweather had replaced in Green River) to form Mudhoney. Fairweather joined former Malfunkshun singer Andrew Wood, Gossard, and Ament, to form Mother Love Bone. The band seemed destined for success until, on March 19, 1990, shortly before the release of their debut album Apple, Andrew Wood died from a heroin overdose. After this, Ament and Gossard went on to form Pearl Jam while Fairweather joined the Seattle grunge band Love Battery as the bassist. After three albums and many tours, he left the group and began focusing on studio work and family life. In 2008, Green River reunited and have played several live shows since.
