= Moonland =

Moonland or MoonLander may refer to:

== Music ==
- "Moonland", a 2008 song by Nick Cave and the Bad Seeds from their album Dig, Lazarus, Dig!!!
- Moonlander (album), a 2013 studio album by Stone Gossard
- Moonlander (musical instrument), a biheaded electric guitar designed by Yuri Landman

== Fictional places ==
- Ithilien, a fictional region in JRR Tolkien's Middle-earth, whose name translates to "Moon-land"
- The Moonlands, a setting for the Magi-Nation Duel card game and its television adaptation

== Other uses ==
- A slang term for Japan, used on the internet
- Extraterrestrial real estate
- Moonlander (video game), the earliest known video game with a hidden Easter egg

== See also ==
- Moon landing (disambiguation)
