= Calm Down Juanita (album) =

Studio album by Calm Down Juanita
- Released: 1998
- Genre: Alternative rock, Psychedelic rock
- Length: 34:03
- Label: Echo Records
- Producer: Ty Willmann and Steve Wilmans

Calm Down Juanita chronology
Calm Down Juanita (1998)	Undertown (2002)

Calm Down Juanita is the eponymous first album by psychedelic rock group Calm Down Juanita, released in 1998 through Echo Records. The album was recorded entirely at the Fremont House in Seattle, Washington on 4-track cassette. Ty Willman played keyboard and guitar and sang vocals, while Kevin Guess played drums, keyboard, and loops.

This release features Sweet Water bassist Cole Peterson, who wrote one song on the album, Girlfriend, on which Willman's fellow Green Apple Quick Step member, Mari Anne Braeden, plays bass. Leigh Stone did vocals on Aerospace Runway. Lobotomy was co-written by X bassist John Doe and Willman and featured Doe on vocals and bass. Guess both wrote and sang Touchin' Myself, which features an unusual lineup, with drummer Josh Freese on bass guitar, guitarist Stone Gossard on drums, and Riff Raff on vinyl and samples.

Monsters, featuring model Camellia Clouse on vocals and Critters Buggin saxophonist Skerik on sax, was mixed and mastered by Martin Feveyear It was produced by Ty Willman and Steve Wilmans and released in 1998 on Willman's label, Echo Records,

== Track listing ==
All songs by Calm Down Juanita

No.	Title	Length
1.	"sundays"	4:03
2.	"girlfriend"	1.51
3.	"aerospace runway"	4:23
4.	"hooker for attention"	4:05
5.	"monsters"	3:01
6.	"lobotomy/touchin' myself"	17:07

== Personnel ==
Calm Down Players

- Ty Willman
- Kevin Guess
- R. Cole Peterson, III Esq
- Steve Wilmans

Additional Players

- Mari Anne Braeden
- Camellia Clouse
- John Doe
- Josh Freese
- Leigh Stone
- Riff Raff
- Skerik
- Stone Gossard

Production personnel

- Steve Wilmans
- Ty Willman
- Daniel Mendez
- Martin Feveyear
