= Allison Anders =

American independent film director

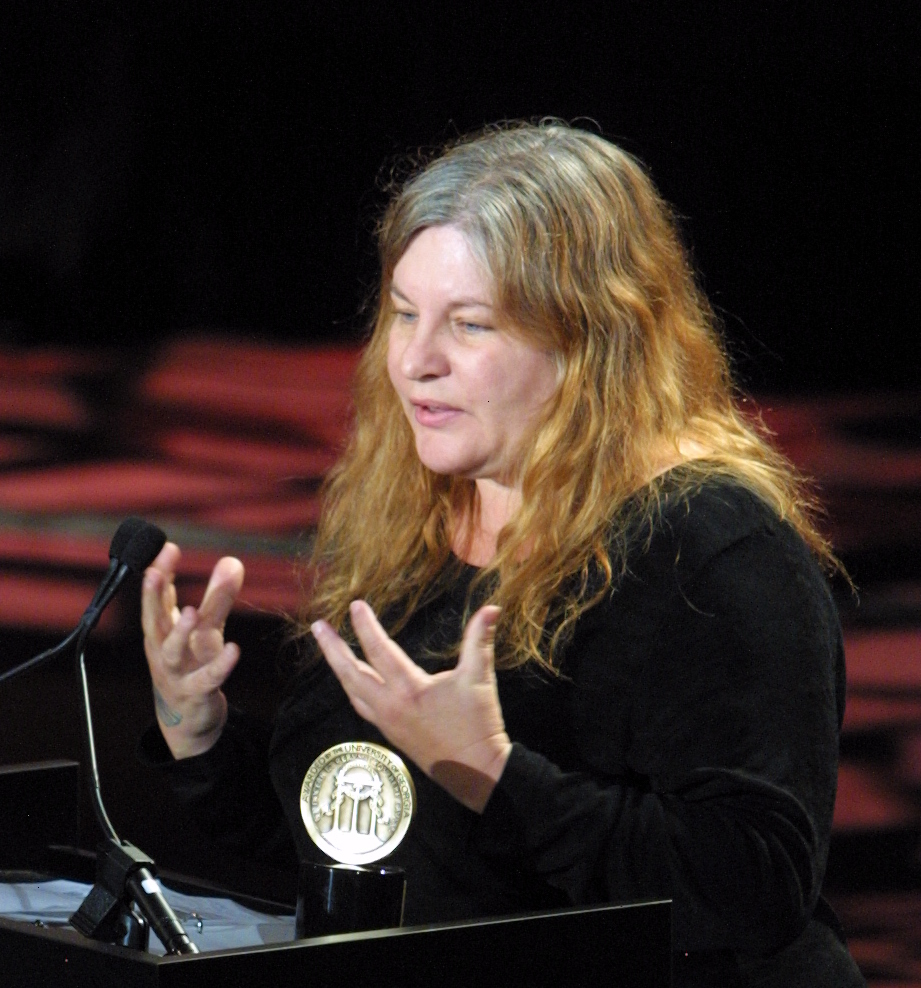
- Allison Anders at the 61st Annual Peabody Awards (2002)
- Born: Mary Allison Anders; November 16, 1954 (age 71); Ashland, Kentucky, U.S.
- Education: UCLA School of Theater, Film and Television
- Occupations: Director, screenwriter
- Years active: 1987–present
- Known for: Gas Food Lodging; Mi Vida Loca; Grace of My Heart
- Children: 3

Allison Anders (born November 16, 1954) is an American independent film director whose films include Gas Food Lodging, Mi Vida Loca and Grace of My Heart. Anders has collaborated with fellow UCLA School of Theater, Film and Television graduate Kurt Voss and has also worked as a television director. Anders' films have been shown at the Cannes International Film Festival and at the Sundance Film Festival. She has been awarded a MacArthur Genius Grant as well as a Peabody Award.

== Early life ==
Anders was born in Ashland, Kentucky, to mother Alberta "Rachel" Anders (née Steed) and father Robert "Bob" Anders. She has two sisters, one of whom, Luanna Anders, starred in her first film, Border Radio. Her paternal side has ancestry that traces back to the Southern Hatfield family and, more distantly, to George Washington's spy, Caleb Brewster, while her maternal side includes another Washington spy, Abraham Woodhull.

When Anders was 4 years old, her father abandoned the family. Anders' mother and father were divorced when she was 5. At age 12, she was gang raped by three boys at a party in Cape Canaveral, Florida, an event that influenced several of her films. After her mother moved her and her sisters to Los Angeles, Anders suffered a mental breakdown at the age of 15 and was hospitalized. When she came out of the psychiatric ward, she was placed into foster care but ran away. She hitchhiked across the country, at one point ending up in jail. After turning 17, Anders dropped out of her Los Angeles high school and moved back to Kentucky. She later moved to London with the man who fathered her first child.

In her early 20s, Anders moved back to Los Angeles with her daughter and attended a junior college, Los Angeles Valley College, while working odd jobs. Due to constant relocation as a child, Anders had not had a steady education. She said that growing up, most of her time was spent watching TV and going to movie theaters. Inspired by the films of Wim Wenders and other filmmakers, Anders applied to UCLA Film School. During her time at UCLA, Anders produced her first sound film. Wenders attended the screening. She has called Wenders' 1974 film Alice in the Cities "one of my very favorite films, and a guiding light, since I first saw it at the Nuart (Theatre) in Santa Monica in the 1970s." In 1986, Anders got her B.A. in Motion Picture-Television from UCLA.

== Career ==
=== Film ===
In 1986, Anders won a Samuel Goldwyn Writing Award for a script called Lost Highway that she wrote about her father. She said that after writing the script she shared it with her father, and was able to have a relationship with him again.

Anders' first film, the punk music-heavy Border Radio, was co-written and co-directed with Kurt Voss and Dean Lent and was made while they were at UCLA. It was nominated for Best Feature of 1988 by the Independent Feature Project for Best First Feature. The film told the story of three musicians who stole money owed to them from a job and then fled to Mexico. The story is set amid the Los Angeles punk-rock scene of the 1980s. With a $2,000 contribution from actor Vic Tayback and loans from Voss's parents to fund the film, the filmmakers made up for the small budget by using local locations and casting performers they knew. For the starring role, they cast Anders' sister, Luanna Anders, and musician Chris D., as the leading man, as well as Anders' daughter, Devon Anders, who played Luanna's daughter in the film. Violating UCLA policy, the filmmakers cut the film at night in the school's editing bays, while Anders' two young daughters slept on the floor. In 2007, Border Radio was given a special release on DVD as part of the Criterion Collection and was lauded as groundbreaking independent cinema.

Anders' second feature, the 1992 film Gas Food Lodging, earned her a New York Film Critics Circle Award and National Society of Film Critics honors for Best New Director; and nominations from the Independent Spirit Awards for Best Screenplay and Best Director. Actress Fairuza Balk won a Spirit Award for her role in the film. The film also won the Deauville Film Festival Critics Award and was also nominated for the Golden Bear at the 42nd Berlin International Film Festival. Gas Food Lodging is a coming-of-age story about a truck stop waitress and her two daughters, three vibrant, restless women in an isolated Western town. The screenplay was loosely adapted by Anders from the novel Don't Look and It Won't Hurt by Richard Peck.

Her next film, Mi Vida Loca (My Crazy Life), was about girl gangs in the poor Hispanic Echo Park neighborhood of Los Angeles, where Anders lived. It premiered at the Cannes Film Festival in 1993, and saw wide release in 1994. The story features a female perspective on growing up in the inner city.

Anders' 1996 film, Grace of My Heart, was a musical drama executive produced by Martin Scorsese, about a songwriter (played by Illeana Douglas) and her career over several years, including work in the early 1960s in music publishing and production offices, a setting based on the Brill Building. This marriage to a songwriting partner and her emergence as a singer-songwriter in the 1970s are among elements paralleling the career of Carole King, but the film is neither a biography nor entirely fiction. The original soundtrack features new songs written in various styles of the era. Elvis Costello and Burt Bacharach had their first collaboration composing a song for the film, "God Give Me Strength," and were nominated for a Grammy Award.

In the late 1980s, Anders had become friends with members of pop group Duran Duran, and frequently inserted small references to the band in her films (character names, posters on walls, and so on). In 1999, after bassist John Taylor had left Duran Duran and was beginning to launch an acting career, she and Voss co-wrote and co-directed Sugar Town, about the Los Angeles film and music industry. The film starred several musical friends of Anders', including Taylor, X singer John Doe, Spandau Ballet bassist Martin Kemp, and singer/actor Michael Des Barres. Sugar Town followed the interconnected lives of a handful of power brokers, wanna-bes and has-beens. Gwen (played by Jade Gordon), a self-centered would-be rock star, is working as an assistant to production designer Liz (Ally Sheedy); when Gwen discovers Liz has a date with a music producer (Larry Klein), any loyalty she has to her boss disappears. The film received two Independent Spirit Award nominations, for Best Film and Best Newcomer (Jade Gordon). The film also won Anders and Voss the Fantasporto award for Best Screenplay.

Her 2001 autobiographical film, Things Behind the Sun, deals with the long-term aftermath of rape. It was released on the Showtime cable TV network. The film earned an Emmy nomination for actor Don Cheadle as Best Supporting Actor; and three Independent Spirit Award nominations: Cheadle for Best Supporting Actor, Kim Dickens for Best Actress, and Best Film. Anders and co-writer Kurt Voss also received a nomination for an Edgar Award. The film was awarded the SHINE Award as well as the Peabody Award. Things Behind the Sun was inspired by an experience Anders had in 1967 when she was raped by a group of boys. Anders actually shot some of the film in the same location in Cocoa Beach, Florida, where the gang rape occurred.

Anders' 2012 film, Strutter, co-directed with Voss, completed a loose trilogy of films about Southern California musicians that began with Border Radio and Sugar Town. A black-and-white road picture, the film featured Luanna Anders from Border Radio, a scene in the motel room where Gram Parsons died, and a score with music by Ariel Pink and J Mascis. The film was funded by a Kickstarter campaign.

In 2013, Anders released the Lifetime-produced TV movie Ring of Fire, a June Carter Cash biopic that featured the musician Jewel. The film was inspired by John Carter Cash's book, Anchored in Love: A Tribute to June Carter Cash.

=== Television ===
Anders began directing shows for broadcast and cable television in 1999, including several episodes in the second and third seasons of Sex and the City, as well as episodes of Grosse Pointe, Cold Case, The L Word, Men In Trees, The Mentalist, and What About Brian?

In 2011, she directed an episode of the John Wells production, Southland, which involved a car chase scene. Anders directed an episode of Turn: Washington's Spies, which was especially interesting to her because she has distant relatives on both sides of her family who were spies for George Washington.

=== Other work ===
In 2013, Anders interviewed 94-year-old actress and Hollywood legend Marge Champion, who appeared at a 2013 Hollywood film festival screening of 1968 cult film The Swimmer, which starred Burt Lancaster. The interview was featured among behind-the-scenes supplementary material on a 2014 Blu-ray/DVD release of the film by Grindhouse Releasing/Box Office Spectaculars Blu-ray/DVD restoration of the film.

Anders and her musician daughter, Tiffany Anders, started the Don't Knock the Rock Film and Music Festival in 2003 in Los Angeles.

In 2006, she appeared in the road-trip documentary Wanderlust. Anders has also contributed to the web series Trailers from Hell.

In 2013, Anders bid on and won a rock and roll record collection formerly owned by the actress Greta Garbo. She created a website called "Greta's Records" to curate and share the collection of 50 records.

=== In development / past projects ===
- Bastard Out of Carolina
- The House of Forgetting adaptation at Interscope Communications
- Drive-Away Dykes
- Quanah Parker project at AMC Networks with writer Terry Graham
- 6 Foot Rule project at DeFina Film Productions
- Greta Garbo and John F. Kennedy project
- Paul Is Dead project at Cineville

=== Long-term associations ===
Anders counts filmmaker Wim Wenders as a mentor. She started as a fan, sending him letters and music, and Wenders eventually responded. Anders said that she created a faux grant that she "won" so that she and at least one other friend could study under Wenders on location for his film Paris, Texas. They have been friends for over 30 years.

== Teaching ==
In 2003, Anders became a Distinguished Professor at the University of California Santa Barbara, where she teaches in the Film And Media Studies Department one quarter each year. She has taught courses on topics including autobiographic writing, rock and roll films, and music supervision.

== Awards ==
- 1986: Nicholl Fellowships in Screenwriting – Lost Highway
- 1986: Samuel Goldwyn Writing Awards – Lost Highway
- 1988: Independent Spirit Awards for Best First Feature – Border Radio
- 1992: New York Film Critics Circle for Best New Director – Gas Food Lodging
- 1992: National Society of Film Critics for Best New Director – Gas Food Lodging
- 1992: Independent Spirit Awards for Best Screenplay nomination – Gas Food Lodging
- 1992: Independent Spirit Awards for Best Director nomination – Gas Food Lodging
- 1995: MacArthur Fellows Program
- 2001: Independent Spirit Award for Best Film nomination – Things Behind the Sun
- 2002: Spirit of Silver Lake Award from the Silver Lake Film Festival
- 2002: Peabody Award for distinguished achievement and meritorious service – Things Behind the Sun
- 2013: Primetime Emmy Award for Outstanding Directing of a Drama nomination – Ring of Fire

== Personal life ==
Anders has three children. Her two daughters are Tiffany Anders, a musician and music supervisor, and Devon Anders. Her son, Ruben Goodbear Anders, was fostered (and eventually adopted) by the Anders family for three years after the death of his mother, Nica Rogers, who appeared in Mi Vida Loca. Tiffany was named after the film Breakfast at Tiffany's.

== Filmography ==
=== Film ===
Year	Film	Credited as			Notes
Year	Film	Director	Writer	Producer	Notes
1984	Paris, Texas				Production assistant
1987	Border Radio	Yes	Yes		Nominated – Independent Spirit Awards for Best First Feature 1988
1992	Gas Food Lodging	Yes	Yes		Screenplay; Won – New York Film Critics Circle for Best New Director 1992; Won – National Society of Film Critics for Best New Director 1992; Nominated – Independent Spirit Awards for Best Screenplay 1992; Nominated – Independent Spirit Awards for Best Director 1992
1993	Mi Vida Loca	Yes	Yes		
1995	Four Rooms – Segment: "The Missing Ingredient"	Yes	Yes		
1996	Grace of My Heart	Yes	Yes		
1997	Lover Girl			Yes	Executive producer
1999	Sugar Town	Yes	Yes		Written by; co-directed with Kurt Voss
2001	Things Behind the Sun	Yes	Yes		
2002	In the Echo (TV movie)	Yes	Yes	Yes	Costume designer
2007	The Pacific and Eddy			Yes	Executive producer
2009	Until the Very Last Moment			Yes	Short; executive producer
2011	A Crush on You (TV movie)	Yes			
2011	The Lie				Acted, playing Allison
2012	Strutter	Yes	Yes	Yes	
2013	Ring of Fire (TV movie)	Yes			Nominated – Primetime Emmy Award for Outstanding Directing of a Drama 2013
2013	Fireflies			Yes	Executive producer
2013	Rock N Roll Mamas (documentary)			Yes	Executive producer
2014	I Believe in Unicorns			Yes	Executive producer

=== Television ===
- 1999: Sex and the City – director, 4 episodes: "The Caste System", "La Donleur Exquise", "Drama Queen", "The Big Time"
- 2000: Grosse Pointe – director, 2 episodes: "Boys on the Side", "Star Wars"
- 2004: Cold Case – director, 1 episode: "Volunteers"
- 2006: The L Word – director, 1 episode: "Last Dance"
- 2006: Men in Trees – director, 1 episode: "Power Shift"
- 2006: What About Brian – director, 2 episodes: "What About First Steps", "What About the True Confessions?"
- 2011: Southland – director, 2 episodes: "Sideways", "Fallout"
- 2013: The Mentalist – director, 1 episode: "The Red Barn"
- 2014: Orange Is the New Black – director, 1 episode: "You Also Have a Pizza"
- 2014: Gang Related – director, 1 episode: "Invierno Cayó"
- 2014: The Divide – director, 1 episode: "Facts Are the Enemy"
- 2014–2015: Murder in the First – director, 4 episodes: "Pants on Fire", "Blue on Blue", "The McCormack Mulligan", "Nothing But the Truth"
- 2015: Turn: Washington's Spies – director, 1 episode: "False Flag"
- 2015: Proof – director, 1 episode: "Memento Vivere"
- 2017: Time After Time – director, 1 episode: "Suitcases of Memories"
- 2017: Riverdale – director, 2 episodes: "Chapter Seven: In a Lonely Place", "Chapter Fifteen: Nighthawks"
- 2017: Graves – director, 1 episode "The Opposite of People"
- 2018: Sorry for Your Loss – director, 1 episode: "Visitor"
- 2019–2023: Mayans MC – director, 2 episodes: "Kukuklan" and "My Eyes Closed and Then Filled on the Last of Childhood Tears"

== Works and publications ==
- Anders, Allison. "On Claudia Weill's film 'Girlfriends.'" Sight & Sound. Vol. 25 (10). London: British Film Institute, October 2015. ISSN 0037-4806
