= Pest Control (album) =

Studio album by Devilhead
- Released: 1996
- Genre: Alternative rock, post-grunge
- Length: 42:51
- Label: Loosegroove Records
- Producer: Devilhead

Devilhead chronology
Your Ice Cream's Dirty (1994)	Pest Control (1996)

Pest Control is the second studio album by the American rock band Devilhead.

== Track listing ==
No.	Title	Length
1.	"Little John"	2:53
2.	"Super Extra Large"	3:05
3.	"Hanging Myself"	4:01
4.	"Gay Affair"	2:44
5.	"Chocolate Bus"	3:40
6.	"The Hard Song"	3:44
7.	"Black Hills"	4:51
8.	"Buying Milk"	2:36
9.	"The Ringo Starr"	4:43
10.	"Fluffer"	3:34
11.	"The Van"	4:52
12.	"Hog Wild"	2:08

== Personnel ==
- Brian Wood – lead vocals, guitar
- Kevin Wood – guitar
- Tim Young – guitar, backing vocals, banjo
- Cory Kane – bass, Hammond organ
- Mike Stone – drums, piano
- Tyler Willman – lead vocals on "Buying Milk"
