= Undertown (album) =

Studio album by Calm Down Juanita
- Released: 2002
- Genre: Alternative rock, Psychedelic rock
- Length: 48:36
- Producer: Gizmo and Toony (Feasley & Guess)

Calm Down Juanita chronology
Calm Down Juanita (1998)	Undertown (2002)

Undertown is the second album by psychedelic rock group Calm Down Juanita, released in 2002.

This album featured recording engineer Steve Feasley on bass guitar and once more, special appearances by several other players. Undertown saw Tyler Willman singing and writing most lyrics, with the exception of two songs: Heavy, with lyrics and vocals by kevtone (Kevin Guess), and Monkeyfist, with lyrics, vocals, and sitar by Seamalt Jones. Willman played guitars, rhodes, and harmonica throughout the album, synthesizer on Slowdance and Youfo, and bass on both Thinkitsenough and the outro solo for Castle. He also did samples and records on Let Me In and some percussion on Buttermonk, Castle, and Kandy. Kevtone played drums and other percussion on every song and synthesizer on every song except Slowdance. He also did samples on Buttermonk, Castle, and Kandy and bass guitar on Stumpgumby. Steve Feasley played bass guitar on all but two songs: Thinkitsenough and Stumpgumby. Saxophonist Skerik returned to play sax on Sofacide; violinist Bob Antone played on both Monkeyfist and Jessie; vocalist Om Jahari sang on Cruisin'; and the 'Late Night Rappers' both wrote and sang the lyrics for Kandy.

Most of Undertown was recorded by Steve Feasley and Steve Wilmans at Seattle's Bamboo Recording Studio, where Wilmans mixed both Stumpgumby and Sofacide. Feasley recorded Youfo, Monkeyfist, and Jesse, did some overdubs, and did most of the transfers, mixing, and mastering at Love Studio in Seattle, where one song, Buttermonk, was mixed by both Feasley & Justin Warner. All the artwork and layout for Undertown was done by "the impotent p. earwig" and copyrighted to "plague doctor studios". The album was produced by "gizmo and toony" (Feasley & Guess) and all its songs were copyrighted to Calm Down Juanita in 2002.

== Track listing ==
All songs by Calm Down Juanita

No.	Title	Length
1.	"pepper"	2:56
2.	"slowdance"	2:38
3.	"thinkitsenough"	1:29
4.	"youfo"	4:16
5.	"buttermonk"	4:15
6.	"heavy"	3:43
7.	"castle"	3:16
8.	"monkeyfist"	4:16
9.	"let me in"	4:16
10.	"cruisin'"	3:47
11.	"kandy"	2:44
12.	"jessie"	4:34
13.	"stumpgumby"	2:12
14.	"sofacide"	4:14

== Personnel ==
Calm Down Players

- Tyler Willman
- Steve Feasley
- Kevtone Guess

Additional Players

- Bob Antone
- Seamalt Jones
- Om Jahari
- "The Late Night Rappers"
- Skerik

Production personnel

- Steve Wilmans
- Steve Feasley
- Kevtone Guess
- Justin Warner
