= Samuel Goldwyn (disambiguation) =

Samuel Goldwyn (1882–1974) was an American film entrepreneur.

Samuel Goldwyn may also refer to:

- Samuel Goldwyn Jr. (1926–2015), American film entrepreneur
- Goldwyn Pictures, film production company, 1917–1924
- Samuel Goldwyn Productions, film production company, 1923–1959
- The Samuel Goldwyn Company, film production company, 1979–1997
- Samuel Goldwyn Films, film production company, 2000–present
- Samuel Goldwyn Studio, the Hollywood backlot
- Samuel Goldwyn Writing Awards
