= Kurt Voss =

American film director

- Born: Kurt Christopher Peter Wössner; September 16, 1963 (age 63); Los Angeles, California, U.S.
- Occupations: Film director, screenwriter, musician, songwriter
- Years active: 1987–present
- Spouses: Sammi Davis (m. 1990; div. 1993); Sara Ashley (m. 2012)

Kurt Voss (born Kurt Christopher Peter Wössner; September 16, 1963) is an American film director, screenwriter, and musician-songwriter. Voss's credits include Will Smith's debut Where The Day Takes You; the Justin Theroux, Alyssa Milano and Ice-T action film Below Utopia; actress Jaime Pressly's debut feature Poison Ivy: The New Seduction, and rock and roll related films including Down and Out with the Dolls and Ghost on The Highway: A Portrait of Jeffrey Lee Pierce and The Gun Club.

Voss has frequently collaborated with fellow UCLA alumnus Allison Anders. Working together over twenty-five years, the duo created a trilogy of rock films: Border Radio (1987), a portrait of the L.A. punk scene featuring John Doe (X) and Dave Alvin (The Blasters) and published by The Criterion Collection; the Sundance-premiered Sugar Town (1999), featuring John Taylor (Duran Duran) and Rosanna Arquette; and Strutter (2012), a Kickstarter-financed independent film.

== Training at UCLA and Border Radio ==
Voss graduated (UCLA Film School) at age twenty with the designation of most promising graduate. Border Radio began as a sub rosa project at the UCLA film school by Allison Anders, Dean Lent and Kurt Voss, who pooled their talents as co-producers, co-writers and co-directors to turn out their $82,000 black and white film, which the Los Angeles Times called "quite simply one of the best films ever made about the world of rock music". Critic Kevin Thomas added, "The music and image go together so powerfully, it's poetry." Chris D. Stars as an underground L.A. rocker who flees to Mexico to hang out and drink beer after robbing the safe of a club owner who cheated his band. Upon its theatrical release, L.A. Weekly critic Johnathan Gold wrote, "This is the movie Penelope Spheeris wishes she had made, a movie that explores the punk aesthetic without condescending to it, a sweet, funny no-future movie that hints there is a future after all." Creem Magazine called it "The sort of small film one longs to see more often" and praised "...A subtle, dynamic score by Dave Alvin." It was not only the opportunity to do a full-fledged soundtrack that attracted Alvin to Border Radio. "The film was different," he says. "It had three directors, which is very different. I realized that what I do as a musician is very close to what independent filmmakers do." Alvin also felt akin with Border Radio because the film is set on his turf, inside the Los Angeles rock scene; in fact, its main actors are Alvin's longtime friends Chris D. of Divine Horsemen and X's John Doe."

The Hollywood Reporter had deemed Border Radio "A wonderfully quixotic look at vanishing dreams and misplaced integrity." But Voss' first feature experience was almost his last, when he became fed up with financial and distribution problems and turned to the track to support himself, with mixed result.

== Horseplayer ==
His bad luck with horses led to two films dealing with the subject. Hollywood Reporter critic Duane Byrge found the first feature, Horseplayer, an "eerie and nauseating look into the most twisted form of artistic inspiration." Reclusive Bud Cowan (Brad Dourif) is a weirdo who works in a liquor store. All bundled up in down jacket, ski mask and gloves, he sits in the cold box, making sure the shelves stay stocked with beverages. Bud's well-defended seclusion is breached when Mathew (M.K. Harris) and Randi (Sammi Davis), a pair of siblings, force themselves into his life. Mathew is an artist whose inspirations come from his sister's lovers. Randi seduces Bud, in effect mentally raping him, but Bud turns out to be a good deal less balanced than any of her previous conquests. Kevin Thomas of The Los Angeles Times called the film "winning, thrilling... The L.A. minimalist movie at its best. A dry, deadpan psychological thriller that makes a virtue of its no-budget." Critic Betsey Sherman of The Boston Globe wrote, "This psychothriller is one of the best American independent films this year." The L.A. Reader's critic Andy Klein said, "The story bears a certain resemblance to The Servant; the difference is that none of director-cowriter Kurt Voss's characters, even the largely loathsome Mathew, are reduced to unreal symbols. Horseplayer is one of the most professional and engrossing independents of the year." Lead actor Brad Dourif explained his attraction to the role of Bud thusly: "I'd done Horseplayer roles before, but the writing in it is so terrific. There just aren't that many scripts that are that good."

Columnist Stephen Saban chronicled the production of Horseplayer in an article entitled "Horse D'Oeuvre" in the February 1990 issue of Details magazine.

Horseplayer had its world premiere at the Sundance Film Festival and was released theatrically by Greycat Films.

== Genuine Risk ==
With a 1950-ish jazz score and dark tone (though the film was shot in color), Genuine Risk tells the story of Henry (Peter Berg), a boyishly naive loser at the track who ends up a runner for racketeer Paul Hellwart (Terence Stamp). Voss considered casting the veteran Stamp a coup. Upon the film's theatrical release, Los Angeles Times critic Michael Wilmington said, "Probably young writer-director wanted the kind of high-style gritty mix Stephen Frears achieves in The Grifters. But Genuine Risk is safer, slighter: a formula job that only rarely breaks the mold." LA Weekly called Genuine Risk "...A chance to show tough-guy untraviolence accompanied by crisp, state-of-the-art sound effects of bones cracking...glossy, vapid, morally bankrupt."

Alain Silver, editor of Film Noir: An Encyclopedic Reference to the American Style, found elements to appreciate in the film: "Genuine Risk has the deadliest of the femme fatales and is the most traditional in approach. It is also the most self-conscious, as locations, lighting style, and art direction constantly underscore the sordidness of the milieu. Even more overt is the script which features lines like, 'A racetrack is like a woman...a man weathers so much banality in pursuit of the occasional orgasmic moment.' What distinguishes Genuine Risk is the offhandedness of its violence, where people are beaten or die painfully, abruptly and without reason in stagings that capture the disturbing tone of videotapes of real events from surveillance cameras. It also has some wryness and novelty in its plot and casting, most notably Terrence Stamp as a 60's British pop star turned petty mobster." Voss himself said, "Genuine Risk was a movie with Peter Berg and Terence Stamp that was done as part of the noir wave of the time. Actually a better example of the genre was Delusion (1991), which I was a writer on. But Genuine Risk had some good stuff in it, too. I really liked working with Terence Stamp, because he's so economical an actor."

== Delusion ==
The L.A. Weekly summarized Delusion's plot thusly: George (Jim Metzler), an executive who's embezzled $450,000 to start his own computer firm in Reno, falls prey instead on dat old debbil road to a flaky Mafia contract killer named Chevy (Kyle Secor) and his lippy sidekick (Jennifer Rubin). A collaboration between Voss and the film's debut director, Carl Colpaert, Delusion was featured in Paper Magazine's 'Best of Guide', where film critic Dennis Dermody called it "...A nerve-racking desert noir thriller...a moody and unnerving film." Gary Franklin from KABC-TV said, "...It's A 10!...A major sleeper...Trust me - See Delusion." Critic Stuart Klawans of The Nation wrote, "It's a delight...Discover and cherish.". Village Voice's Georgia Brown claimed: "An auspicious first film...(that) easily beats most of the studio competition." Terry Kelleher of Newsday opined: "A 90's film noir...visually striking and refreshingly feminist." Seattle Times writer John Hartl said: "An amusingly twisty, and entertaining film noir homage." Debut actress Jennifer Rubin also earned acclaim, Playboy resident critic Bruce Williamson asserting,"...Jennifer Rubin steals every scene she has." Boston Globe writer Robin Adam Sloan agreed, writing, "Jennifer Rubin has charged the screen with sex appeal." Kevin Thomas of The L.A. Times wrote, "The clever way in which Colpaert and his co-writer Kurt Voss bring Delusion to its conclusion allows the film to wryly comment on the capacity of two seemingly very different men to give way to a macho posturing that reveals money is more important than any person," Daily News film critic Bob Strauss adding, "Delusion's climactic sequence injects contemporary strains of greed any misogyny into a classic western motif—it's funny and a little frightening to see that the frontier is not only open, but getting wider."

== Where the Day Takes You ==
"The final verdict on Where the Day Takes You-successful street-wise melodrama with roots in grim reality or malodorous vagabond project with too many stars and too much direction-could go either way," wrote David Hunter of The Village View, continuing: "Produced before the spring L.A. riots, written with no intrusive political viewpoint, director Marc Rocco's ambitious tale of teen runaways and career homeless in Hollywood, attempts to marry 80's self-consciousness with 60's group consciousness both in the film's storyline and style of direction." From The Seattle Post-Intelligencer: “The story, which was scripted by Rocco, Michael Hitchcock and Kurt Voss, follows a young man just out of his teens named King (Dermot Mulroney) and his 'family' of runaways.” “In this case,” Major continues, “King’s 'family' consists of speed addict Greg (Sean Astin), angry and rebellious Little J (Balthazar Getty), Manny (Will Smith, using a wheelchair), love hungry and overweight Brenda (Ricki Lake), and philosophical loner Crasher (James LeGros).” The film also features Lara Flynn Boyle, Kyle MacLachlan, Alyssa Milano, Steven Tobolowsky and an uncredited Christian Slater as a social worker.” Major concludes, “In spite of the remarkable stock of fine performances, however, the film’s real gem is it’s [sic] screenplay by Rocco, Kurt Voss, and Michael Hitchcock.”

Janet Maslin of The New York Times said, "This is Rebel Without a Cause without the grown-ups and without boundaries." Critic David Sheehan of KNBC-TV Los Angeles said, "Captures the hard core reality of L.A. street kids with intensity and brilliance." Bob Healy of the Satellite News Network/KBIG Radio spoke of Where the Day Takes You as, "One of the ten best films of the year." Jeff Craig of 60 Second Preview simply claimed, "4 Stars. A stunner."

== Amnesia ==
From TV Guide:"Ally Sheedy plays the wife of an adulterous minister in this smart 1996 comic thriller. Paul Keller (Nicholas Walker) is a pastor whose desire to leave his wife is spurred by his passion for his stepson's teacher. Paul wants out so badly that he fakes his death while on a fishing trip. Good plan, except that Keller accidentally hits his head, loses his memory, and wakes up in the seedy love shack where he cheated on his wife. Only now he's the prisoner of its love-starved owner (Sally Kirkland) and things go from bad to worse when a vengeful Mrs. Keller (Sheedy) shows up."

== Mid-1990s action films ==
Voss directed several straight-to-video action titles in this period, including Baja starring Molly Ringwald, Donal Logue, Lance Henriksen and Corbin Bernsen; Below Utopia starring Alyssa Milano, Ice-T and Justin Theroux; The Pass starring William Forsythe, Michael Mckean, Nancy Allen and James Le Gros; and The Heist (aka Shot Down), with Luke Perry, Ice-T, Richmond Arquette, David Faustino and Amy Locane.

Voss also co-wrote and co-produced the thriller Dangerous Touch with Lou Diamond Phillips, who starred and directed.

About the concluding of this action film period, Voss said: "Roundabout '97, the Asian market collapsed for action movies. And now I think part of the problem is all the DV films. There's more movies now than ever, and competition for the entertainment dollar. These movies aren't recouping the way they used to."

== Poison Ivy: The New Seduction ==
Voss directed Poison Ivy: The New Seduction, a 1997 American erotic thriller drama starring Jaime Pressly, and the third installment of the Poison Ivy franchise, which consists of Poison Ivy (1992), Poison Ivy II: Lily (1995) and Poison Ivy: The Secret Society (2008). TV Guide said: "For the third installment in the increasingly tawdry POISON IVY franchise, the filmmakers eliminate the earlier entries' star power, and never apologize for fashioning little more than a straight-to-video soap opera, overflowing with bared flesh and cheap thrills." Said Voss of the film: "I don't know. I needed a paycheck, and I knew it would recoup its costs."

== Sugar Town ==
Sugar Town, a micro-budgeted ensemble film satirizing the ruthlessness of the music industry, isn't about reliving the self-destructive cliches of the rock 'n' roll lifestyle: it's about celebrating second chances. "We were at a weird crossroads in our careers," says Allison Anders (Grace of My Heart), who co-wrote and codirected with Kurt Voss. "I couldn't get any fucking films made." So the former live-in lovers revived the do-it-yourself spirit from their days as students at UCLA Film School."We thought of who we knew and wrote the story around them," says Voss of their film, which was honored as the Centerpiece Premiere at the Sundance Film Festival. "We did anything so we could start shooting and not be beholden to anybody." Wrote the late Roger Ebert, "The movie's insider atmosphere is honestly come by. The co-directors, Allison Anders and Kurt Voss, live in this world themselves, many of the actors are their friends, the houses are where some of these people actually live.". Janet Maslin of The New York Times: "Anders and Voss shot their film in only three weeks and successfully caught lightning in a bottle ... It's not easy to pick a favorite character in this knowing, warmly funny Los Angeles ensemble film." Time Magazine's Richard Schickel said of Sugar Town, "...Written and directed with casual aplomb by Allison Anders and Kurt Voss...A sweetheart of a movie."

Anders and Voss did extensive publicity for the theatrical release of Sugar Town, including modelling alongside the film's stars John Taylor and Rosanna Arquette in a fashion spread in Premiere magazine.

== Things Behind The Sun ==
From Creative Screenwriting magazine: "Allison Anders and Kurt Voss are guerrilla filmmakers who tell accessible, effective stories about the rarest commodity in movies today: recognizable human beings. Their third collaboration, Things Behind The Sun, directed by Anders and co-written by Voss, received a standing ovation at the 2001 Sundance Film Festival, and deservedly so. One of the best American films of the year, Things Behind The Sun deals with an uncomfortable cinematic subject: rape and its myriad consequences." Variety's David Rooney wrote, "A bruising, personal film based on the early adolescent experience of director Allison Anders, Things Behind The Sun centers on the meeting between two people scarred by childhood rape and their struggle to piece together the past and move on. Scripting with her Border Radio and Sugar Town collaborator Kurt Voss, Anders' primary theme is the need to return to the past and unearth suppressed memories in order for healing to begin." Ebert and Roeper gave the film "Two thumbs up."

The film bypassed theatrical release and debuted on Showtime. Kurt Voss said of the release pattern: "The good thing is that on TV, you know that six million viewers will see this as opposed to maybe one million in the theater. That's a big audience."

Things Behind The Sun earned 2002 Independent Spirit Award nominations for both Kim Dickens (Best Female Lead) and Don Cheadle (Best Supporting Male). Cheadle also earned a Primetime Emmy Nomination for Outstanding Supporting Actor in a Miniseries or Movie.

The film garnered a Peabody Award, which was presented to Anders and Voss by journalist Walter Cronkite on May 20, 2002, at the Waldorf-Astoria in New York City.

== Down And Out With The Dolls ==
From LA Weekly: "Voss returns to the interpersonal relations of rock personalities with Down and Out With The Dolls, the story of an all-girl Portland punk band who - composed as they are of archetypes (self-obsessed lead singer, comically sincere guitarist, pragmatic bass player and happy hedonist drummer) - follow the classic rock arc of scrappy beginnings, salad days and fatal implosion. Voss, whose kept busy over the years directing personal indies and straight to video titles, has developed a crisp, expedient cinematic style that may preclude more profound characterizations but that suits a fast-paced rock and roll spiral." From The Vancouver Sun: "Voss's prying camera moves from scenes in smoky clubs to skate parks, from fluorescent-lit record shops to tired, wood-paneled diners. The atmosphere is pure Sleater-Kinney Northwest." Kevin Thomas wrote in The L.A. Times: "Authentically raw, raucous... The hilariously outrageous is tinged with just enough pain and darkness to keep this comedy tethered to reality." The film includes "Wry cameos from the likes of NYC's Coyote Shivers, as a heart-throb rock god, and Motörhead's Lemmy Kilmister, as an addled sage" (L.A. Weekly).

Down and Out With The Dolls played at film festivals including Munchen International, Vancouver International, Karlovy Vary and L.A.'s Gay and Lesbian Film Festival, Outfest. It was released theatrically by Indican Films.

== Ghost on the Highway: A Portrait of Jeffrey Lee Pierce and The Gun Club ==
Los Angeles 1980s punk band The Gun Club were a whirlwind of drugs, voodoo and dark imagery...Kurt Voss's captivating film tells their story. More importantly it recalls, in warts and all detail, the out-there genius of their driving force, the late Jeffrey Lee Pierce. Former collaborators Kid Congo Powers, Ward Dotson, Terry Graham, Jim Duckworth and Dee Pop tell their leader's story with rueful humor, anger and tears. Their disparate characters engage throughout the 98 minutes. Mojo magazine gave the film "Four stars (****)."

The documentary film premiered at Allison Anders's "Don't Knock The Rock" Film and Music Festival at the Redcat theatre, Disney Hall, Los Angeles on June 29, 2007. The screening was accompanied by a live concert by surviving Gun Club members.

== Strutter ==
On November 15, 2010, Kurt Voss and Allison Anders began a public fundraising campaign via Kickstarter. Allison Anders and Kurt Voss made Strutter for $25,000. Voss credited the film's creation with being able to pull a "career's worth of favours". Brendan Kelly of The Montreal Gazette wrote, "It's a terrific film. Anders – who is best known for directing the award winning 1992 indie cult classic Gas Food Lodging – and Voss consider this to be the final film in their rock n' roll trilogy, which includes the 1987 flick Border Radio, a snap shot of the LA punk scene starring real life rockers John Doe from X and Dave Alvin from The Blasters, and the 1999 film Sugar Town, which stars John Taylor from Duran Duran as an aging rocker." During the production, cast and crew drove into the high desert, where they shot an improvisational scene in Room 8 at the Joshua Tree Inn to perform a seance for country-rocker Gram Parsons, who died there. The on-camera tributes and interactions were spontaneous and raw."It's real vomit in the movie when the kids are sick from drink at the strip club," noted Voss of the mostly young cast. "They carried on like little hellions." Arte-TV called the film "...Pure Punk Rock." Hollywood Reporter said: "Anders and Voss are greatly helped in their effort by a fresh-faced and talented cast, led by (Flannery) Lunsford, whose quiet desperation always has the undertones of a guy almost ready to explode, with Elyse Hollander and Sara Ashley delivering charming supporting turns as friends trying to keep him just on the right side of crazy."

In July 2012, Voss and Ashley attended the Munich Film Festival for the world premiere of Strutter. The couple also took the film to Pop Montreal Film Festival in Quebec, Canada. In October 2012, the pair again represented the film, this time before the Japanese press, at the Tokyo International Film Festival.

Kurt and Sara next surfaced in July, 2014 with a musical project entitled Sadistic Hands, releasing debut single and video, "So Low".

Strutter was released theatrically in Japan on September 14, 2013. It awaits digital distribution in the U.S., although as recently as July 2014 it has screened at repertory theaters, often with Voss and Anders in attendance to discuss the film's production methods and the viability of crowd source financing.

Anders and Voss also co-wrote Things Behind The Sun (2001), which was awarded a Peabody Award in 2002.

== Music ==
In addition to his film work, Voss is a founding member of the West Coast punk band The Hindi Guns, an outfit which produced three albums. Of the debut album, The Hindi Guns (2004, French Fan Club Records), Rolling Stone magazine's Senior Editor David Fricke wrote, "I've already found one of my favorite new bands of the year: a rough, bewitching four-piece from Portland...'I Don't Want To Drink Mercury' is your best ticket into these ten tracks: a bluesy crawl set in dub-like darkness, like early Hole produced by Lee Perry." Early vinyl pressings of the album found their way into the hands of the late and legendary BBC Radio 1 DJ, John Peel, who put three of the album tracks into rotation on his BBC program.

The album was supported by a West Coast tour which was filmed for a short tour diary. The Hindi Guns second album, Rarities (2009), was a collection of EP material, B-sides and studio outtakes. The album was reviewed in Record Collector by British punk critic Kris Needs, who gave the record four stars: "Anyone who dedicates a song to 'Instant Karma and The Peel Sessions' must have their heart in the right place. The late DJ was a fan and it's not hard to see why." After the departure of original singer Dee Dee Cheriel, the founding members of Hindi Guns made a third album, entitled Do Or Die (French Fan Club Records, 2009). The CD featured a photo of a sword-wielding Yukio Mishima; the back cover of the record depicted a photo of the author's severed head. The album received college radio play, and an honorable mention in the annual roundup of "Year's Best" by ex-Times pop writer Kevin Bronson.

In July 2014, Kurt Voss announced via his Google page that he and Sara Ashley were commencing upon a music project entitled Sadistic Hands. The pair released a series of internet singles followed by a full-length album in January 2015, available on cdbaby and iTunes.

== Personal life ==
From 1990 to 1993, Kurt Voss was married to British actress Sammi Davis, with whom he made the film Horseplayer. The couple married in Las Vegas. Davis said Voss had her face tattooed on his upper arm when they said, "I do." "He told me that if we got divorced, he'd have it made into a horse."

Voss married actress Sara Ashley in May 2012. The two met while on set of Strutter. In 2014, they debuted their band, Sadistic Hands.

== Filmography as writer ==
- Strutter (2012) (Writer)
- Ghost on the Highway: A Portrait of Jeffrey Lee Pierce and The Gun Club (2006) (writer)
- In the Echo (2002) (TV) (writer) (unreleased CBS pilot)
- Down and Out with the Dolls (2001) (screenplay) (story)
- Things Behind the Sun (2001) (written by)
- Sugar Town (1999) (written by)
- The Heist (1999) (writer)
- The Pass (1998) (writer)
- Baja (1996) (written by)
- Amnesia (1996) (screenplay)
- Dangerous Touch (1994) (writer)
- Where the Day Takes You (1992) (writer)
- Delusion (1991) (writer)
- Genuine Risk (1990) (screenplay) (story)
- Horseplayer (1990) (writer)
- Border Radio (1987) (writer)

== Filmography as director ==
- Strutter (2012)
- Ghost on the Highway: A Portrait of Jeffrey Lee Pierce and the Gun Club (2006)
- Down and Out with the Dolls (2001)
- The Heist (2000)
- Sugar Town (1999)
- The Pass (1998)
- Poison Ivy: The New Seduction (1997) (V)
- Below Utopia (1997)
- Baja (1996)
- Amnesia (1996)
- Genuine Risk (1990)
- Horseplayer (1990)
- Border Radio (1987)

== Discography ==
- The Hindi Guns - Hindi Guns (2004)
- The Hindi Guns - Rarities (2009)
- Hindi Guns - Do Or Die (2009)
- The Hindi Guns - Patriot Act EP (2004)
- The Hindi Guns - Crowley (Lion CD) - Single (2007)
- Sadistic Hands - S/T (2015)
