= Things Behind the Sun =

2001 film by Allison Anders

- DVD cover
- Directed by: Allison Anders
- Written by: Allison Anders; Kurt Voss
- Produced by: Robin Alper; Daniel Hassid; Doug Mankoff
- Starring: Kim Dickens; Gabriel Mann; Eric Stoltz; Allison Folland; Don Cheadle; Rosanna Arquette
- Cinematography: Terry Stacey
- Edited by: Chris Figler
- Music by: Sonic Youth
- Production companies: Echo Lake Productions; Sidekick Entertainment
- Distributed by: Behind The Sun Productions LLC; Showtime (TV)
- Release dates: January 24, 2001 (Sundance Film Festival); August 18, 2001 (Showtime)
- Running time: 120 minutes
- Country: United States
- Language: English

Things Behind the Sun is a 2001 drama film directed by Allison Anders and starring Kim Dickens and Gabriel Mann. It premiered at the 2001 Sundance Film Festival and was later aired on television by Showtime on August 18, 2001, before receiving a limited theatrical release. The film is based on an early adolescent experience of Anders'.

Its title is taken from a song by Nick Drake. The film was honored with the Peabody Award in 2002.

== Plot ==
Owen, a young reporter for a Los Angeles-based music magazine, returns to his Florida hometown to interview Sherry, a local rock singer. Sherry and her band are becoming increasingly popular, largely because of a song she wrote about being raped as a girl; this song has become a hit on college radio. Owen's reasons for returning to his hometown are more than professional, however: he and Sherry were close friends in childhood. He is also aware of the identity of her rapists, as the ringleader was his brother Dan. Through flashbacks, Owen recalls his complicity in the gang-rapes that his brother Dan and his friends perpetrated on many girls. Whenever he would hear someone being forced into Dan's room, which was adjacent to his own, he would block out the noise with music.

It is later revealed that Sherry had come to Owen's house on the day of her rape to give him a mixtape. Owen resorted to his usual tactic of trying to ignore what was happening, but he was dragged out of his room and forced to participate in her gang-rape. He tells Sherry that he didn't even know it was her until it was over.

Owen informs his brother Dan that he sent the details of Sherry's rape, including his own role in the crime, to Dan's parole officer and to his own editor. Owen also informs him that he has found some of the twelve girls who were raped, and they are willing to testify against Dan to the parole board. Dan will never be able to leave prison. When Dan vehemently asks why Owen is doing this, Owen replies that he loved Sherry.

== Cast ==
- Kim Dickens as Sherry McGrale
  - Brittany Renee Finamore as Young Sherry McGrale
  - Kristen Vigard as Singing Voice (dubbed; uncredited)
- Gabriel Mann as Owen
  - Owen Butler as Young Owen
- Don Cheadle as Chuck
- Rosanna Arquette as Pete
- Alison Folland as Lulu
- Elizabeth Peña as Carmen
- Eric Stoltz as Dan
  - Justin de Prume as Young Dan
- CCH Pounder as Judge
- Shawn Reaves as "Tex"
- Patsy Kensit as Denise

== Production ==
Anders based the film on her own experience as a young girl. Anders said she had tried to deal with her rape at age twelve "in therapy, through acting out sexually, through self-medication … by every means possible, but I still was in a dark place." The film was shot on digital video. The camera used was the Sony DSR-500. This is Anders' third film to center on music industry figures, after Grace of My Heart and Sugar Town.

=== Music ===
Rock band Sonic Youth provided the film's score. Several hits from 1960s band The Left Banke are also featured. Kristen Vigard provided Kim Dickens' singing voice.

== Reception ==
=== Release ===
The film premiered January 24, 2001 at the Sundance Film Festival. It was also screened at the Los Angeles Film Festival on April 28, 2001 and at the Karlovy Vary Film Festival on July 7, 2001. Though Anders got an offer for theatrical distribution, the film was released on Showtime. Of its TV airing, Anders said the advantage would be "millions of people will see [the] movie as opposed to what you’ll usually get on an indie theatrical release."

=== Critical reception ===
On the review aggregator website Rotten Tomatoes, 100% of 12 critics' reviews are positive, with an average rating of 7.1/10. Critics praised Anders' unsentimental, understated approach to her subject and the film's performances.

David Rooney of Variety wrote, "Playing a character prone to drinking binges and out-of-control behavior, [Kim Dickens] nonetheless conveys the woman’s pain, anger and tragic vulnerability in quietly measured terms that make her performance all the more affecting." In The A.V. Club, Nathan Rabin wrote Don Cheadle "invests the seemingly thankless role of Dickens' manager, protector, and long-suffering semi-boyfriend with pathos and gravity." Rooney added, "Anders' primary theme is the need to return to the past and unearth suppressed memories in order for healing to begin. While this is standard movie-of-the-week fodder, the raw treatment and controlled intensity here set it apart, as does the extension of the film’s gaze beyond the rape victim."

In a positive review, critic Emanuel Levy wrote "the duality of P.O.V., showing the rape and its ruinous consequences from [various points of view]...endows the film with a unique angle seldom seen before." Writing for FilmCritic.com, Rachel Gordon said the film "adheres to a perspective important for both men and women to see," and that "what sets Things Behind the Sun apart from such [films such as The Accused] is that it takes these stories one step further, to the severe aftermath of living with these memories years later."

The film's music was also praised, with Rooney noting "the songs here serve to show the powerful effect music can have on people, as comfort, release, therapy, memory, escape or as a point of connection." Some criticisms of the film were of the ending, with some saying it wraps things up too tidily, as well as of the dialogue. Jonathan Foreman of the New York Post said these flaws were minor, however, and wrote, it's "rawly personal, and in the way it confronts the sexual aftershocks of the crime – on both victim and perpetrator – it’s a film of remarkable honesty and courage."

== Awards and nominations ==
The film won the Peabody Award in 2002 for its exploration of trauma. It was also nominated for an Independent Spirit Award for Best Feature, as well as Best Female Lead for Kim Dickens. Don Cheadle was nominated for an Independent Spirit Award for Best Supporting Male and an Emmy Award for Outstanding Supporting Actor in a Miniseries or a Movie. The film was nominated for Best Television Feature or Miniseries at the Edgar Allan Poe Awards.

== Home media ==
Things Behind the Sun was released on DVD on April 8, 2003. It contained an audio commentary track from Anders, co-writer Kurt Voss, and producer Daniel Hassid.
