= Your Ice Cream's Dirty =

Studio album by Devilhead
- Released: 1994
- Genre: Alternative rock, grunge
- Length: 52:57
- Label: Sony Music
- Producer: Rick Senechal

Devilhead chronology
Your Ice Cream's Dirty (1994)	Pest Control (1996)

Your Ice Cream's Dirty is the debut studio album by the American rock band Devilhead.

== Track listing ==
No.	Title	Length
1.	"Too Much Protection"	4:02
2.	"#Your Mistake"	2:27
3.	"Don't Make Me"	2:20
4.	"There"	5:44
5.	"Polly"	5:59
6.	"Troubled Moon"	3:13
7.	"Devilhead"	4:14
8.	"Down on the Cow"	4:40
9.	"Birthday"	3:22
10.	"We Like You"	2:50
11.	"Cup of Tea"	5:12
12.	"Funeral March"	4:19
13.	"silence"	0:22
14.	"silence"	0:13
15.	"silence"	0:24
16.	"Man of the Hour"	2:36
17.	"Hidden track"	1:00

== Personnel ==
- Brian Wood - vocals, guitar, bass, piano
- Kevin Wood - guitar
- John McBain - guitar
- Dan McDonald - bass
- Shawn Smith - piano
- John Waterman - bass, vocals
