= For the Best of Us =

Studio album by John Doe
- Released: July 25, 2006
- Genre: Rock, punk rock
- Length: 35:13
- Label: Yep Roc
- Producer: John Doe, Dave Way

John Doe chronology
Forever Hasn't Happened Yet (2005)	For the Best of Us (2006)	A Year in the Wilderness (2007)

For the Best of Us is an album by John Doe, the co-founder of the Los Angeles-based punk rock band X. It was released on Yep Roc Records on July 25, 2006. The album is a repackaging of an EP Doe originally released in 1998 on the Kill Rock Stars label, entitled For the Rest of Us. Doe is billed as "The John Doe Thing" on the album.

Professional ratings
Review scores
Source	Rating
AllMusic	4/5 stars
Boston Phoenix	3.5/4 stars
Exclaim!	(very favorable)
PopMatters	7/10 stars
Robert Christgau	(choice cut)
Slant Magazine	3.5/5 stars

== Track listing ==
All tracks composed by John Doe; except where indicated

1. "A Step Outside"
2. "Let's Get Lost"
3. "The Unhappy Song"
4. "Bad, Bad Feelings"
5. "This Loving Thing"
6. "Criminal"
7. "Broken Smile"
8. "Come Home"
9. "Zero"
10. "Vigilante Man" (Woody Guthrie)

== Personnel ==
- Travis Dickerson – Mastering
- John Doe – Bass, Guitar, Vocals
- Tim Hale – Photography
- Smokey Hormel – Guitar, Vocals
- Neil Kellerhouse – Design
- Tony Marsico – Bass
- Steven McDonald – Bass
- Viggo Mortensen – Photography
- Joey Waronker – Drums, Percussion
- Dave Way – Drum Programming, Engineer, Mixing, Producer
