= Devilhead =

American alternative rock group

- Origin: Seattle, Washington, U.S.
- Genres: Alternative rock, post-grunge
- Years active: 1993–1998
- Label: Loosegroove
- Past members: Brian Wood; Kevin Wood; Tyler Willman

Devilhead were an American alternative rock group formed by brothers Kevin Wood (guitar) and Brian Wood (vocals), who were both elder brothers of the late Andrew Wood, the singer of Malfunkshun (which also featured Kevin) and Mother Love Bone, in 1994 in Seattle, Washington following the breakup of their previous group The Fire Ants. Both Kevin and Brian were the only permanent members of the group and they released two albums, Your Ice Cream's Dirty in 1994 on Loosegroove Records, with album art by Regan Hagar; and Pest Control in 1996, which featured a number of contributors including bassist John Waterman and guitarist John McBain, both of the band Hater. For a period in 1997, former Soundgarden bassist Ben Shepherd was a member of the band. They were also briefly fronted by Green Apple Quick Step front man Tyler Willman before eventually disbanding.

== Discography ==
- Your Ice Cream's Dirty (1994)
- Pest Control (1996)

== Members ==
- Brian Wood – vocals
- Kevin Wood – guitar
- Tyler Willman – drums
- Dan McDonald – Bass
