= Sugar Town (film) =

1999 American independent film

- Film poster for Sugar Town
- Directed by: Allison Anders; Kurt Voss
- Written by: Allison Anders; Kurt Voss
- Produced by: Daniel Hassid
- Starring: Rosanna Arquette; Beverly D'Angelo; Ally Sheedy; Martin Kemp; John Taylor; Michael Des Barres
- Distributed by: October Films; USA Films
- Release date: September 17, 1999 (U.S.)
- Running time: 92 minutes
- Country: United States
- Language: English
- Budget: $250,000
- Box office: $178,095

Sugar Town is a 1999 independent film co-written and co-directed by Allison Anders and Kurt Voss, concerning a tangled web of characters coping with ambition, fame, and the aftermath of fame. The film was named after the 1966 hit single "Sugar Town" by Nancy Sinatra.

Anders was eager to make another film about the music industry after her earlier films Border Radio and Grace of My Heart. After her friend John Taylor had left Duran Duran and was beginning to launch an acting career, she and Voss wrote the film fairly quickly, and cast several musical friends of hers in the convoluted plot.

The film premiered at the Sundance Film Festival on January 26, 1999, where it received a distribution deal with October Films and USA Films. Sugar Town was then shown in limited release in the United States in September of that year, before appearing at several overseas film festivals.

== Plot ==
Clive, Jonesey and Nick form an aging supergroup built of refugees from other bands. They and their producer Burt seek backing from Jane, a rich investor who will only help if the lead singer will sleep with her.

Liz is a neurotic film production designer who has just hired a conniving young housekeeper and would-be singer named Gwen. Liz searches hopelessly for a decent man while Gwen commits acts of shameless cruelty in the service of her ambition. As Liz goes on a date with who she thought was a normal person with a normal job outside of the entertainment industry, she later discovered that he was actually trying to work in the entertainment industry.... basically by means of her connections in the industry and so on.

Best friend to Liz is Clive's wife Eva, an older actress who is struggling to get good roles. Clive and Eva's life is thrown into upheaval when a cult member shows up on their doorstep to drop off a surly 12-year-old "love child" that she claims Clive fathered.

A subplot involves guitarist Carl, who is hired to travel away from his pregnant wife by a singer with ulterior motives, just as his junkie brother emerges from rehab and comes to stay with the family.

== Cast ==
=== Main cast ===
- Jade Gordon as Gwen
- John Taylor as Clive
- Rosanna Arquette as Eva
- Michael Des Barres as Nick
- Martin Kemp as Jonesy
- Larry Klein as Burt
- John Doe as Carl
- Lucinda Jenney as Kate
- Ally Sheedy as Liz

=== Supporting cast ===
- Marion Moseley as In Utero Baby
- Veronica Nommenson as Violet
- Elena Nommenson as Rose
- Amelia Nommenson as Daisy
- Nicholas Walker as Masseuse
- Jeff McDonald
- Catherine Munro as Groupie #1
- Kristina Hayes as Groupie #2
- Alyse Pozzo as Groupie #3
- Richmond Arquette as Rick
- Lumi Cavazos as Rosio
- Michael E. Rodgers as Journalist (Credited as Michael Rodgers)
- Paige Dylan as Nerve's Mom
- Vincent Berry as Nerve
- Polly Platt as Maggie
- Chris Mulkey as Aaron
- Simon Bonney as Band Member #1
- Kelly Jones as Band Member #2
- Beverly D'Angelo as Jane
- Antonia Bogdanovich as Maya
- Kai Lennox as Alex
- Kadu Lennox as Monte
- Bijou Phillips as Autograph Girl
- Ursula Brooks as Tracy
- Lacey Rodine as Groupie #4
- Phillip Tan as Karate Instructor

== Production ==
This movie was written and filmed in less than six months, so quickly that Lucinda Jenney's actual pregnancy, which Allison Anders and Kurt Voss had written into their script, was still ongoing when she played the part.

== Reception ==
Sugar Town received generally mixed reviews from critics. Review aggregator Rotten Tomatoes gives the film an approval rating of 67%, based on 24 reviews, with an average rating of 6.18/10. Metacritic, which uses a weighted average, assigned the film a score of 62 out of 100, based on 26 critics, indicating "generally favorable" reviews. In Roger Ebert's review, he states, "The movie is not profound or tightly plotted or a 'statement,' nor should it be. It captures day-to-day drifting in a city without seasons, where most business meetings are so circular and unfocused it's hard to notice when they stop resulting in deals and simply exist for their own sake."
