= Under the Big Black Sun (book) =

Under The Big Black Sun: A Personal History of L.A. Punk
- First edition
- Author: John Doe Tom DeSavia
- Language: English
- Subject: Punk rock
- Genre: Music
- Publisher: Da Capo Press
- Publication date: 2016
- Publication place: United States
- ISBN: 978-0306824081

Under The Big Black Sun: A Personal History of L.A. Punk is a book by John Doe of the American punk rock band X and co-author Tom DeSavia. The book examines the evolution of Los Angeles punk rock between 1977-1982, covering the years between the emergence of punk as an underground phenomenon and ending as some of the musicians in the scene crossed over to mainstream success. The book featured guest chapters by Exene Cervenka (Doe's ex-wife and co-lead vocalist in X); along with Jane Wiedlin and Charlotte Caffey of The Go-Go's, Mike Watt of Minutemen, and Henry Rollins of Black Flag. Green Day's Billie Joe Armstrong penned a foreword for the book.

The audiobook version received a Grammy Award nomination in the "spoken word" category.

== Reviews ==
Eric Noble-Marks of Exclaim! gave the book 7 out of 10 commented that although it is "flawed and incomplete," the book "is valuable for not only giving us a glimpse into what punk rock looked like and sounded like, but also what it felt like." Ryan Bray of The A.V. Club gave the book a "B" rating and noted the potential difficulty of the "erratic structure of DeSavia and Doe’s narrative." Jedd Beaudoin of PopMatters gave the book eight out of ten stars and said the memoirs allow the reader to "feel something akin to being there."
