= Wonderful Virus =

Studio album by Green Apple Quick Step
- Released: 1993
- Studios: Bad Animals, Seattle, Washington
- Genre: Hard rock
- Length: 43:08
- Labels: Medicine, Reprise
- Producer: Daniel Rey

Green Apple Quick Step chronology
Wonderful Virus (1993)	Reloaded (1995)

Wonderful Virus is the debut album by the American band Green Apple Quick Step. It was released in 1993 on the Medicine label. The album was produced by Daniel Rey.

Medicine released the single "Ludes and Cherrybombs" as a promotional CD in Europe in 1993, containing the album version, a version remixed by Martin Feveyear, and an edited version of that remix. The single was also released as a limited edition 7" purple vinyl in the UK in 1994, with the Feveyear remix on one side and the other side containing an acoustic version of "Feel My Way", as well as an X song, "The Unheard Music". Both B-side tracks were recorded by John Goodmanson, mixed by Phil Ek, and produced by Green Apple Quick Step and Martin Feveyear.

== Critical reception ==
Professional ratings
Review scores
Source	Rating
AllMusic	3/5 stars
The Encyclopedia of Popular Music	3/5 stars

Trouser Press wrote that "Ty Willman is an inoffensively functional vocalist and the lyrics use more big words than Eddie Vedder, but anyone looking for originality or effective musical excitement would do better turning up other rocks." The Washington Post determined that "the album provides the sort of sometimes funky hard rock predicted by the quintet's Seattle return address."

== Track listing ==
All songs by Green Apple Quick Step

No.	Title	Length
1.	"Dirty Water Ocean"	2:53
2.	"Broken"	4:42
3.	"Ludes and Cherrybombs"	5:38
4.	"Bottle"	4:56
5.	"Rapid"	5:51
6.	"Feel My Way"	4:41
7.	"Pay the Rent"	2:56
8.	"Can't Believe"	3:54
9.	"Eating on All Fours"	2:57
10.	"Stereo"	4:40

== Personnel ==
Green Apple Quick Step

- Tyler Willman – vocals
- Steve Ross – guitar
- Daniel Kempthorne – guitar
- Mari Ann Braeden – bass, vocals
- Bob Martin – drums

Production

- Daniel Rey – production
- Ed Brooks – engineering
- Ron Saint Germain – mixing
- Bob Ludwig – mastering
