= Kissingsohard =

Studio album by John Doe
- Released: 1995
- Label: Forward/Rhino
- Producers: Don Gilmore, John Doe

John Doe chronology
Meet John Doe (1990)	Kissingsohard (1995)	Freedom Is... (2000)

Kissingsohard is an album by the American musician John Doe, credited to the John Doe Thing. It was released in 1995. Doe promoted the album by touring with Juliana Hatfield, and then with Shane MacGowan.

== Production ==
The album was produced by Don Gilmore and Doe. Doe desired to make an album in an alternative rock style, in contrast to country sound of his solo debut. He considered many of the songs to be of a more personal nature, compared to the ones he wrote in X.

"My Goodness" and "Love Knows" were cowritten with Exene Cervenka. Brad Houser, Chalo Quintana, Smokey Hormel, and Joey Waronker played on Kissingsohard; Sandra Bernhard and Cervenka contributed vocals. "Willamette" was inspired by the lives of homeless people in Portland, Oregon. Doe considered adding a cover of "Vigilante Man" to the album.

== Critical reception ==
Professional ratings
Review scores
Source	Rating
AllMusic	2.5/5 stars
The Encyclopedia of Popular Music	3/5 stars
Entertainment Weekly	A−
Los Angeles Times	3/4 stars
MusicHound Rock: The Essential Album Guide	2/5 stars
Orlando Sentinel	4/5 stars

No Depression wrote that "crash and burn guitars, string arrangements, and tape loops overwhelm some of the songs, and leave enough space for others to breathe." Entertainment Weekly thought that Doe's "bracing, sinewy vocals provide the perfect complement for these unsettling vignettes."

Trouser Press stated: "Avoiding the kind of sweeping statements that tend to bring such proceedings to a screeching halt, Doe zeroes in on the details of lives under extreme stress." The Los Angeles Times determined that "the full-bodied songs, stained with tragic tears and sloshed beers, feature fine fretwork from Blasters guitarist Smokey Hormel and a distinct country twang." Newsday concluded that, "by filtering the downbeat ethos of hard country through a continually evolving post-punk consciousness, Doe has come up with rare album that reaches across the alternative and adventuresome adult markets."

AllMusic wrote that "no one seems to understand Doe's music like his old bandmates in X, and his strong vocals and lyrics just can't carry the record on their own."

== Track listing ==
All tracks are written by John Doe, except where noted.

No.	Title	Writer(s)	Length
1.	"Fallen Tears"		2:39
2.	"Safety"		3:10
3.	"Love Knows"	Doe, Exene Cervenka	3:38
4.	"My Goodness"	Doe, Cervenka	3:12
5.	"Tragedy by Definition"		3:31
6.	"Kissing"		4:08
7.	"Hits the Ground"		4:30
8.	"Going Down the Fast"		4:00
9.	"T.V. Set"		4:49
10.	"Beer. Gas. Ride Forever"		2:46
11.	"Field of Dirt"		4:11
12.	"Willamette"		3:21
13.	"Liar's Market"		5:09
