= Genuine Risk (film) =

- Directed by: Kurt Voss
- Starring: Terence Stamp; Michelle Johnson; Peter Berg; M.K. Harris
- Music by: Deborah Holland
- Production company: I.R.S. Media
- Release date: November 21, 1990
- Running time: 90 minutes
- Country: United States
- Language: English

Genuine Risk is a 1990 American crime thriller film directed by Kurt Voss and starring Terence Stamp and Peter Berg.

== Plot ==
A young, naive gambler is recruited by his friend to work for a former 60s pop star turned cold and vicious mobster. Things get even more heated when the mobster's girlfriend comes between the two men.

== Cast ==
- Terence Stamp as Paul Hellwart
- Peter Berg as Henry
- Michelle Johnson as Girl
- Michael Harris as Cowboy Jack
- Theodore Wilson as Billy
- Sid Haig as Curly
- Max Perlich as Chris Wood
- Hal Shafer as Loren

== Reception ==
Michael Wilmington of the Los Angeles Times gave the film a negative review and wrote, "The people who made Genuine Risk would probably like us to believe they’re taking a few risks themselves. But they aren’t."

TV Guide also gave the film a negative review: "It's a no-frills thriller with all the basic ingredients but no flavor."

Rose Thompson of Radio Times awarded the film two stars out of five.
