= Bayleaf (album) =

Studio album by Stone Gossard
- Released: September 11, 2001
- Recorded: 1999–2001 in Seattle, Washington
- Genre: Alternative rock
- Length: 39:43
- Language: English
- Label: Epic
- Producer: Pete Droge

Stone Gossard chronology
Bayleaf (2001)	Moonlander (2013)

Professional ratings
Review scores
Source	Rating
AllMusic	3/5 stars
Blender	3/5 stars

Bayleaf is the first studio album by American musician Stone Gossard, best known as the guitarist for Pearl Jam. It was released on September 11, 2001, on Epic Records.

== Overview ==
The album features ten songs written over a span of four to five years. The album was recorded by Gossard over a 2 1/2-year period in Seattle, Washington and completed in 2001. Gossard worked with producer Pete Droge. Gossard sang lead vocals on seven out of the album's ten tracks, while guest vocalists Pete Droge and Ty Willman sang on the remaining three tracks. Gossard also contributed drums and piano to the album, as well as guitar, bass and vocals. Former Pearl Jam drummer Matt Chamberlain contributed his drumming to two tracks, "Bore Me" and "Fits". The album was mixed by Matt Bayles. The album's cover art was illustrated by Beth Haidle. The album's songs feature a mellow sound influenced by Frank Black, Rufus Wainwright, and The Rolling Stones. The album charted at number 37 on Billboard's Top Heatseekers chart. Greg Prato of AllMusic said, "While not as strong as his output with Brad, Bayleaf still has its moments."

== Track listing ==
All tracks are written by Stone Gossard.

No.	Title	Length
1.	"Bore Me"	3:45
2.	"Fits"	4:05
3.	"Pigeon"	4:32
4.	"Anchors"	4:41
5.	"Cadillac"	3:03
6.	"Bayleaf"	6:05
7.	"Every Family"	3:12
8.	"Unhand Me"	3:46
9.	"Hellbent"	3:31
10.	"Fend It Off"	3:03

Japanese bonus track

All tracks are written by Gossard.

No.	Title	Length
11.	"Can't Stop"	3:53

Online bonus track

No.	Title	Length
11.	"Shame On You"	5:38

== Personnel ==
- Stone Gossard – vocals, electric and acoustic guitars, bass guitar, piano, drums, percussion, conga, background vocals

Additional musicians and production

- Zac Baird – Nord Lead synthesizer
- Matt Bayles – keyboards, engineering, mixing
- Edward Brooks at RFI CD Mastering – mastering
- Matt Chamberlain – drums on "Bore Me" and "Fits"
- Tony Coleman – tambourine, percussion
- Guy M. Davis – bass guitar, background vocals
- Mike Dillon – vibraphone
- Pete Droge – background vocals, 12-string guitar, Prophet 5 synthesizer, slide guitar, clavinet, mellotron, guitar, bass guitar, keyboards, acoustic guitar, production
- Beth Haidle – artwork and photo transfer
- Paul Haidle – CD artwork
- Brad Klausen – design and layout
- Lance Mercer – photos
- Mike Stone – drums
- Ron Weinstein – piano, Hammond C3 organ
- Ty Willman – lead vocals on "Cadillac", "Unhand Me", and "Fend It Off", background vocals
- Steve Wilmans – engineering on "Hellbent"

== Chart positions ==
Chart (2001)	Position
Top Heatseekers	37
