= Calm Down Juanita =

American rock band

- Origin: Seattle, Washington, U.S.
- Genres: Alternative rock, psychedelic rock
- Years active: 1998–2002
- Label: Echo
- Members: Tyler Willman; Kevin Guess; R. Cole Peterson III, Esq. Steve Wilmans; Steve Feasley

Calm Down Juanita is a Seattle, Washington studio band writing partnership between vocalist Tyler Willman and drummer Kevin Guess, catalyzed and engineered by Steve Wilmans, that has featured several other notable players. Their sound is progressive psychedelic alternative rock. They recorded and released two albums in the late 1990s and early 2000s, with different bass players and multiple guests on each album. The band was described as "acid-y, slinky and soulful," and as having a style somewhere between The Flaming Lips and later-period Marvin Gaye.

== History ==
Ty Willman and Kevin Guess co-wrote most of the music for the two studio albums that have emerged from the partnership: an eponymous 7-song debut EP CD in 1998, and a 14-song full-length CD in 2002, entitled Undertown, both of which featured several other notable musicians.

Their first album, Calm Down Juanita, was recorded entirely at the Fremont House in Seattle on 4-track cassette, during the summer of 1997. Ty Willman played keyboard and guitar and sang vocals, while Guess played drums, keyboard, and loops. This release also featured bassist Cole Peterson, bassist Mari Anne Braeden, vocalist Leigh Stone, drummer Josh Freese playing bass guitar, guitarist Stone Gossard playing drums, Riff Raff on vinyl and samples, bassist and vocalist John Doe, vocalist Camellia Clouse, saxophonist Skerik. Steve Wilmans was the engineer and the album was produced by Willman and Wilmans and released in 1998 on Willman's label, Echo Records.

Willman and Guess would team up again to write music for a second album, Undertown, released in 2002; this time featuring recording engineer Steve Feasley on bass guitar. Once more, there were special appearances by several other players, including Seamalt Jones, saxophonist Skerik, violinist Bob Antone, vocalist Om Jahari, the 'Late Night Rappers'. Most of Undertown was recorded by Steve Feasley and Steve Wilmans at Seattle's Bamboo Recording Studio. The album was produced by "gizmo and toony" (Feasley & Guess).
