= Reloaded (Green Apple Quick Step album) =

Studio album by Green Apple Quick Step
- Released: 1995
- Recorded: October 1994
- Genres: Alternative rock, grunge
- Length: 42:25
- Label: Medicine
- Producers: Nick DiDia, Stone Gossard

Green Apple Quick Step chronology
Wonderful Virus (1993)	Reloaded (1995)	New Disaster (1998)

Reloaded is the second album by the grunge group Green Apple Quick Step, released in 1995 through Medicine Records. The album was produced by Nick DiDia and Pearl Jam guitarist Stone Gossard.

== Critical reception ==
Professional ratings
Review scores
Source	Rating
AllMusic	4.5/5 stars
Entertainment Weekly	B−

Trouser Press considered the album an improvement on the debut, writing that the band displays "real initiative" and that it spreads "its surprisingly useful stylistic wings." CMJ New Music Monthly wrote that the "alterna-rock promise of [the] debut in no way hints at the leaps and bounds by which the band seems to have grown, or the unexpected paths Reloaded follows."

== Track listing ==
All songs by Green Apple Quick Step

No.	Title	Length
1.	"Hotel Wisconsin"	3:54
2.	"Ed #5"	3:23
3.	"No Favors"	2:50
4.	"T.V. Girl"	4:24
5.	"Underwater"	4:24
6.	"Dizzy"	3:12
7.	"Alligator"	5:15
8.	"Los Vargos"	3:58
9.	"Tangled"	4:12
10.	"Lazy"	4:12
11.	"Space C*cksucker"	3:12
12.	"Halloween"	3:29

== Personnel ==
Green Apple Quick Step

- Tyler Willman – vocals, acoustic guitar, organ
- Steve Ross – guitar
- Daniel Kempthorne – guitar
- Mari Ann Braeden – bass, vocals
- Bob Martin – drums

Additional personnel

- Jerod Kaplan – additional percussion

Production personnel

- Nick DiDia – production, engineering, mixing
- Stone Gossard – production
- Rick Senechal – engineering, mixing
