= Samuel Goldwyn Writing Awards =

American writing award

The Samuel Goldwyn Writing Awards are bestowed annually by the Samuel Goldwyn Foundation, which is funded by a trust established by the Goldwyn family. Started in 1955, the awards are a competitive writing prize open to all University of California students. As of October, 2006, the first prize in the awards is $15,000.

While winners are unknown students when they receive the award, many go on to be prominent writers and filmmakers. Previous award winners include Francis Ford Coppola, Allison Anders, Carolyn See, Eric Roth, James Robert Baker, Jonathan Kellerman, Steve Erickson, Colin Higgins, Pamela Gray, Carroll Ballard, and Scott Rosenberg.

The final round of the awards are judged by prominent writers, directors, and entertainers, who have included Moss Hart, Billy Wilder, George Stevens, Sidney Poitier, Denzel Washington, Dustin Hoffman, James Brooks, David Mamet, A. Scott Berg, and David Lynch.
