= Border Radio =

- The cover of the Criterion Collection edition.
- Directed by: Allison Anders; Dean Lent; Kurt Voss
- Written by: Allison Anders; Dean Lent; Kurt Voss
- Produced by: Marcus DeLeon
- Starring: Chris D. John Doe; Chris Shearer; Luanna Anders
- Distributed by: International Film Marketing
- Release date: November 1987 (U.S.)
- Running time: 87 min.
- Country: United States
- Language: English

Border Radio is a 1987 independent film directed by Allison Anders, Dean Lent and Kurt Voss.

== Summary ==
A document of the last days of West Coast punk rock, the story follows two musicians and a roadie who haven't been paid and decide to rob money from a club. One of the men flees to Mexico, leaving his wife and daughter behind.

== Cast ==
- Chris D. as Jeff Bailey
- Chris Shearer as Chris
- Dave Alvin as Dave
- Devon Anders as Devon
- Luanna Anders as Lu
- Iris Berry as Scenester
- Julie Christensen as Door Girl
- John Doe as Dean
- Eddie Flowers as Thug
- Green on Red as Band in Club
- Texacala Jones as Babysitter
- Chuck Shepard as Expatriate
- Sebastian Sopeland as Thug
- Craig Stark as Thug
- Billy Wisdom & the Hee Shees as Band in Studio
- Alan Corcoran as Car Salesman
- Gert Wossner as Chris's Dad

== Production ==
The trio met while making Wim Wenders' 1984 film Paris, Texas and drafted a number of celebrities like Wenders and Daryl Hannah for financial support. Most of the funding came from character actor (and family friend of Voss) Vic Tayback.

== Soundtrack ==
The film features music from cowpunk bands and artists, including the Flesh Eaters, Green on Red, John Doe, the Divine Horsemen, X, and the Blasters.

== See also ==
- Border blaster
- 1987 in film
- DIY culture
