= Moonlander (album) =

Studio album by Stone Gossard
- Released: June 25, 2013
- Recorded: 2003–2013
- Genre: Alternative rock
- Length: 44:02
- Label: Monkeywrench Records

Stone Gossard chronology
Bayleaf (2001)	Moonlander (2013)

Professional ratings
Review scores
Source	Rating
Consequence of Sound	C

Moonlander is the second studio album by American musician Stone Gossard, best known as a member of Pearl Jam. The album was released on June 25, 2013, by Monkeywrench Records.

== Track listing ==
All tracks are written by Stone Gossard.

No.	Title	Length
1.	"I Need Something Different"	3:33
2.	"Moonlander"	4:57
3.	"Both Live"	3:36
4.	"Your Flames"	4:21
5.	"Battle Cry"	4:34
6.	"King of the Junkies"	3:35
7.	"I Don't Want to Go to Bed"	5:07
8.	"Remain"	3:51
9.	"Bombs Away"	3:43
10.	"Witch Doctor"	2:44
11.	"Beyond Measure"	4:01
