= Moon landing (disambiguation) =

A Moon landing is the arrival of a spacecraft on the surface of the Moon.

Moon Landing may also refer to:

- "Moon Landing" (Modern Family), an episode of Modern Family
- Moon Landing (music drama), a 2007 music drama by Stephen Edwards
- Moon Landing (album), a 2013 album by James Blunt
- Moon Landing, a 2009 album by Sivert Høyem
- The Moonlandingz, an English rock band
- Mhoon Landing, Mississippi
