= John Doe (musician) =

American singer, songwriter, actor, poet, guitarist and bass player (born 1953)

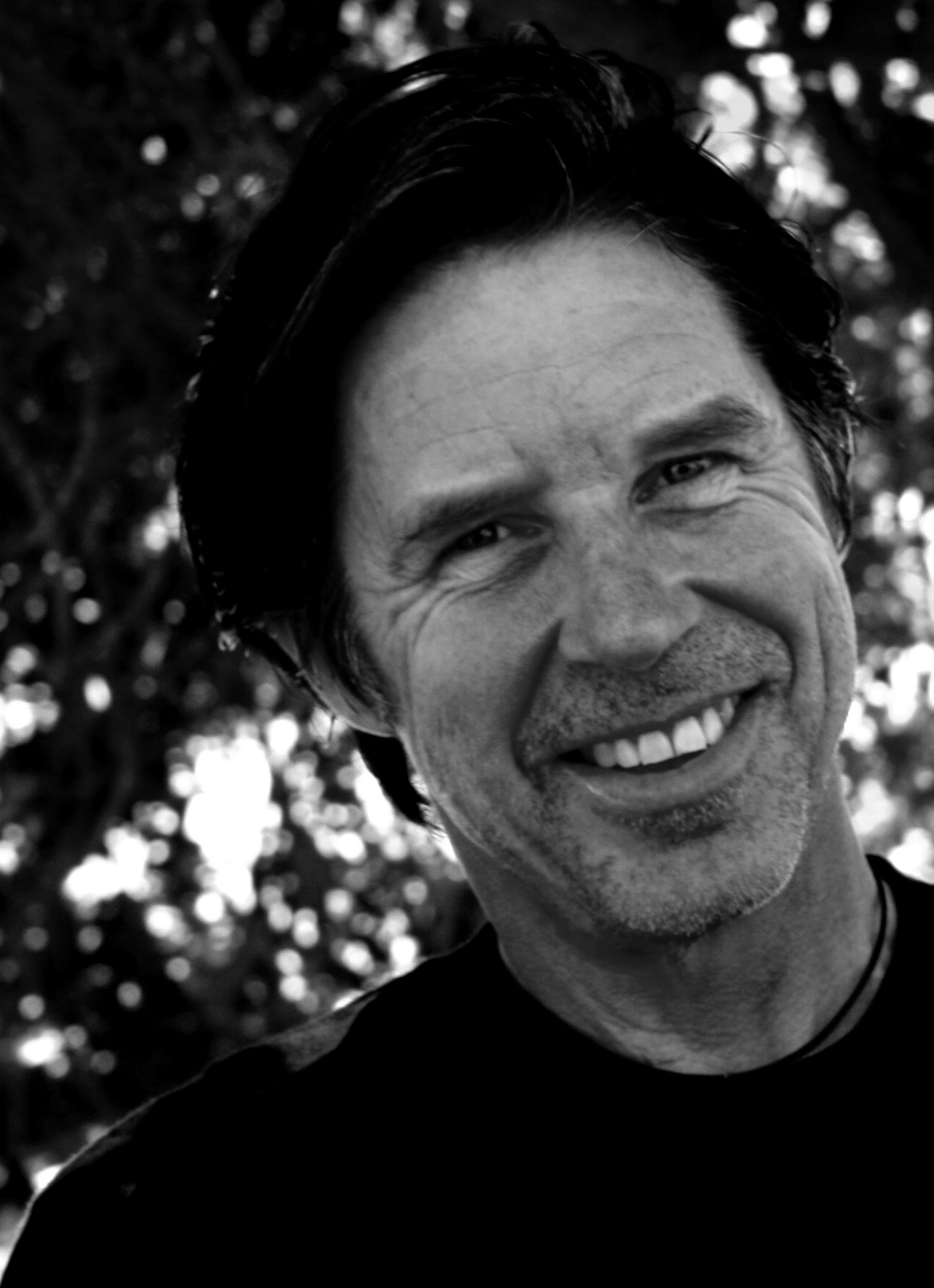
- Doe in 2006

Background information
- Born: John Nommensen Duchac; February 25, 1953 (age 73); Decatur, Illinois, U.S.
- Origin: Los Angeles, California, U.S.
- Genres: Punk rock, alternative country, folk rock, roots rock
- Occupations: Musician; singer; songwriter; actor; poet
- Instruments: Bass guitar, guitar, vocals
- Years active: 1973–present
- Member of: X; The Knitters; John Doe Folk Trio
- Formerly of: The Flesh Eaters
- Website: theejohndoe.com

John Nommensen Duchac (born February 25, 1953), known professionally as John Doe, is an American singer, songwriter, actor, poet, guitarist and bass player. Doe co-founded LA punk band X, of which he is still an active member. His musical performances and compositions span rock, punk, country and folk music genres. As an actor, he has dozens of television appearances and several movies to his credit, including the role of Jeff Parker in the television series Roswell.

In addition to X, Doe performs with the country-folk-punk band the Knitters and has released records as a solo artist. In the early 1980s, he performed on two albums by the Flesh Eaters. He also leads the John Doe Folk Trio.

== Career ==
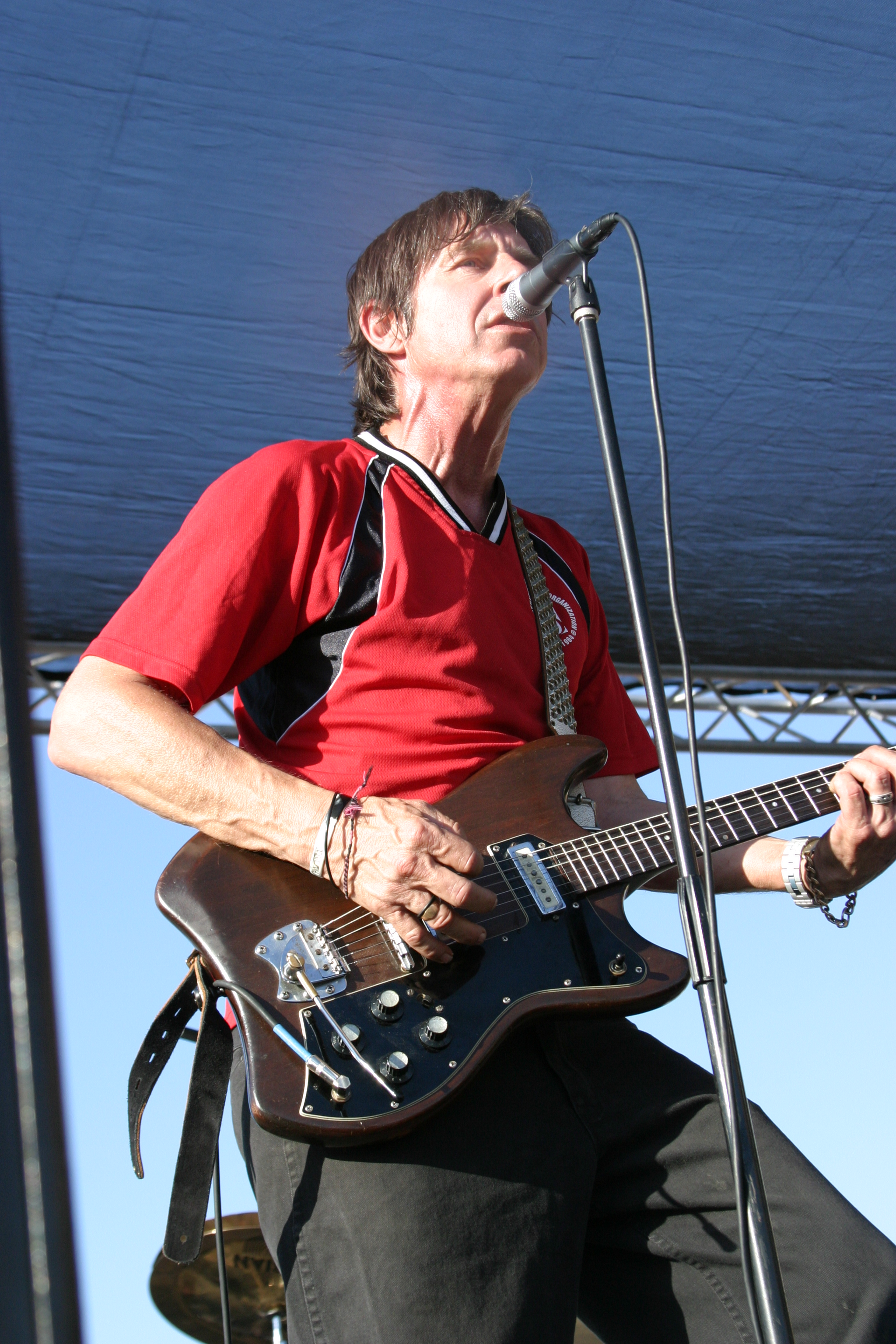
John Doe performing at Adams Avenue Street Fair, San Diego, 2006

=== Music ===
Doe moved to Los Angeles, California, and in 1976 met guitar player Billy Zoom through an ad in the local free weekly paper, The Recycler.

As a musician with X, Doe has two feature-length concert films, several music videos, and an extended performance-and-interview sequence in The Decline of Western Civilization, Penelope Spheeris's seminal documentary about the early-1980s L.A. punk scene.

Along with co-writer Exene Cervenka, Doe composed most of the songs recorded by X. Wild Gift, an album from that band's heyday, was named "Record of the Year" by Rolling Stone, the Los Angeles Times, and The New York Times. With Dave Alvin, he co-wrote two of the songs on The Blasters' 1984 album Hard Line, "Just Another Sunday" and "Little Honey". He also wrote "Cyrano de Berger's Back" for The Flesh Eaters LP A Minute to Pray, a Second To Die.

Since 1990, Doe has recorded nearly a dozen albums as a soloist or in collaboration with other artists, and has contributed tracks to motion pictures. In the 1992 movie The Bodyguard (starring Kevin Costner and Whitney Houston), it is Doe's version of "I Will Always Love You" that plays on the jukebox when Costner's and Houston's characters are dancing. It was released on audio cassette by Warner Bros. in September 1992, but no version is believed to exist on CD. He co-wrote and played on the song "Lobotomy" with Tyler Willman for the eponymous 1998 debut studio album of the band Calm Down Juanita.

Doe took part in Todd Haynes's 2007 movie I'm Not There, recording two Bob Dylan covers, "Pressing On" and "I Dreamed I Saw St. Augustine". Both recordings were included on the film's soundtrack, and the former was prominently featured in the film, with Christian Bale (as Pastor John Rollins) lip-synching Doe's vocals. Doe recorded the song "Unforgiven" in 2007 with Aimee Mann on A Year in the Wilderness, an album which also featured Kathleen Edwards, Jill Sobule, Dan Auerbach. He then joined with Eddie Vedder on a mix of the song "Golden State" in 2008. "The Meanest Man in the World" by Doe was featured in Season 4 of the television series Friday Night Lights and included on the second soundtrack album. Country Club (2009), featuring Canadian indie rock band The Sadies, covered country classics along with original songs.

Doe contributed a cover of "Peggy Sue Got Married" to the 2011 tribute album Rave on Buddy Holly.

His latest solo record, The Westerner, was released in 2016. Doe said that it was made in the Arizona desert, and that the genre of the music is psychedelic soul.

In November 2018, Org Music released Lucky Wheel, a split 12-inch 45 rpm EP by Doe and Micah Nelson (as "Particle Kid"). Credited to "Kid Doe," the release features the two musicians covering one of each other's songs, with Doe performing Nelson's "Wheels" and Nelson performing Doe's "Lucky Penny." The EP also includes Doe's cover of "Hello Stranger" (The Carter Family) and Nelson's cover of "Captain Kidd" (Michael Hurley). Lucky Wheel was issued as a Record Store Day exclusive for Small Business Saturday. The Vinyl District rated the EP "A–".

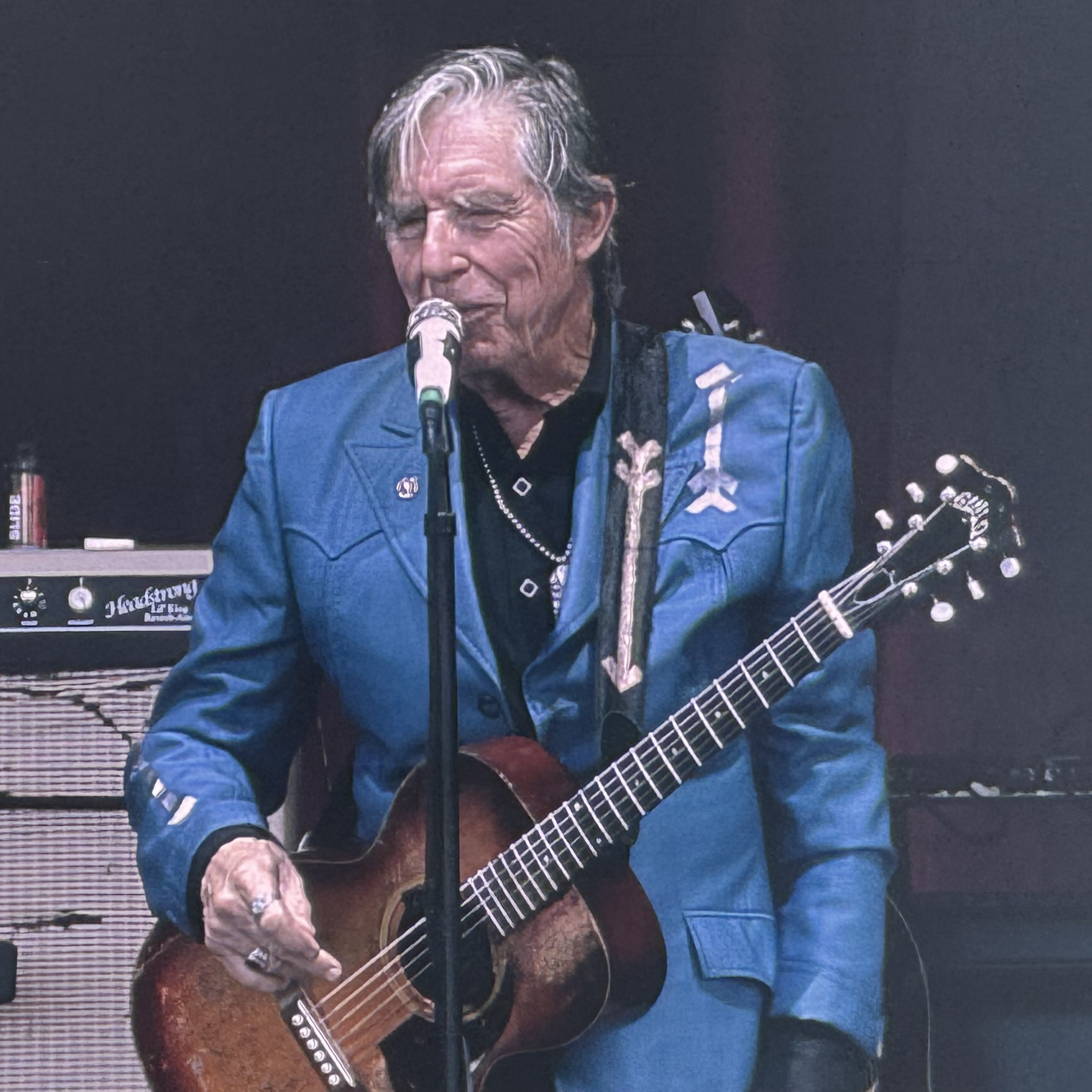
Leading the John Doe Folk Trio in 2026

In November 2022, John Doe released a three song acoustic EP with East Nashville based indie label, 3Sirens, called "3Sirens Session: John Doe". The label was founded by The Grahams, who originally met with John Doe to record the session in Austin, TX at the ChurchHouse, produced by David Garza. In 2026, the John Doe Folk Trio opened for Bob Dylan and Lucinda Williams.

=== Acting ===
In the 1989 biographical film Great Balls of Fire!, Doe played Jerry Lee Lewis's cousin-turned-father-in-law J. W. Brown. Also in 1989 he played the role of the Double Deuce's bartender Pat McGurn in Road House starring Patrick Swayze. He starred in the 1992 films Roadside Prophets and Pure Country, and in the 1998 short Lone Greasers. Other movie acting credits include Road House, Vanishing Point, Salvador, Boogie Nights, The Specials, The Good Girl, Gypsy 83, Wyatt Earp, Border Radio, The Outsiders, and Brokedown Palace. Doe has appeared on the television series Law & Order, Roswell, Carnivale, One Tree Hill, Childrens Hospital (alongside his bandmates in X) and The Wizards of Waverly Place.

=== Author ===
With co-author Tom DeSavia, Doe wrote and compiled stories for a book about the LA punk rock scene from 1977 to 1983. The book, Under the Big Black Sun, incorporated the punk ethos of contributions from other musicians that were part of the scene, people like Exene Cervenka, Jack Grisham, Henry Rollins, Mike Watt, Jane Wiedlin and others who wrote chapters. Doe wanted it to be a collective recollection, not just one person's perspective of the time.

A sequel of sorts was released in 2019 entitled More Fun in the New World: The Unmaking and Legacy of L.A. Punk. Doe and DeSavia again invited contributors to narrate the space of time from 1982 to 1987.

== Personal life ==
Doe was born in Decatur, Illinois. He was married to fellow X member Exene Cervenka between 1980 and 1985. He remarried in 1987. He revealed to Adam Carolla in a podcast in September 2011 that he resided (at the time) in Fairfax, California. He has three daughters. In early 2017, he announced that he would be moving to Austin, Texas.

== Discography ==
John Doe albums
Year	Album	Peak chart positions				Label
Year	Album	US	US Heat	US Indie	US Country	Label
1990	Meet John Doe	193	—	—	—	Geffen
1995	Kissingsohard	—	—	—	—	Forward/Rhino
2000	Freedom Is...	—	—	—	—	spinART
2002	Dim Stars, Bright Sky	—	—	—	—	Artist Direct BMG
2005	Forever Hasn't Happened Yet	—	—	—	—	Yep Roc
2006	For the Best of Us	—	—	—	—	Yep Roc
2007	A Year in the Wilderness	—	42	—	—	Yep Roc
2009	Country Club (with The Sadies)	—	10	37	32	Yep Roc
2011	A Day at the Pass (with Jill Sobule)	—	—	—	—	Pinko
2011	Keeper	—	13	—	—	Yep Roc
2012	Singing & Playing (with Exene Cervenka)	—	—	—	—	Moonlight Graham
2014	The Best of John Doe: This Far	—	—	—	—	Yep Roc
2016	The Westerner	—	—	—	—	Cool Rock
2018	Lucky Wheel (with Micah Nelson aka Particle Kid; as "Kid Doe")	—	—	—	—	Org Music
2022	Fables in a Foreign Land	TBD	TBD	TBD	TBD	Fat Possum
2022	3Sirens Session: John Doe	—	—	—	—	3Sirens
"—" denotes releases that did not chart

== Filmography ==
- The Decline of Western Civilization (1981) as Self - X (Vocals & Bass)
- Smithereens (1982) as Door Guy at Peppermint Club (uncredited)
- Legends of the Spanish Kitchen (1985)
- X: The Unheard Music (1986) as Drunk at club
- Salvador (1986) as Roberto, Restaurant Owner
- Slam Dance (1987) as Det. John Gilbert
- Border Radio (1987) as Dean
- Road House (1989) as Pat McGurn
- Great Balls of Fire! (1989) as J.W. Brown
- A Matter of Degrees (1990) as Peter Downs
- Liquid Dreams (1991) as Cab Driver
- Roadside Prophets (1992) as Joe Mosely
- Pure Country (1992) as Earl Blackstock
- Wyatt Earp (1994) as Tommy Behind-the-Deuce
- Shake, Rattle and Rock! (1994, TV Movie) as Lucky
- Georgia (1995) as Bobby
- Scorpion Spring (1996) as Deputy
- Black Circle Boys (1997) as Bonfiglio
- Vanishing Point (1997, TV Series) as Sammy
- Touch (1997) as Elwin Worrel
- Party of Five (1997, TV Series) as Carter
- The Price of Kissing (1997) as Mouse
- The Last Time I Committed Suicide (1997) as Lewis
- Boogie Nights (1997) as Amber's Husband
- Get to the Heart: The Barbara Mandrell Story (1997, TV Movie) as Joe Maphis
- The Pass (1998) as Bus Station Clerk
- Black Cat Run (1998, TV Movie) as Martin James
- Odd Man (1998, Short) as Welder
- Lone Greasers (1998, Short) as Shakin' Rex
- Veronica's Closet (1999, TV Series) as Jimmy Walsh
- Sugar Town (1999) as Carl
- Knocking on Death's Door (1999) as Professor Ballard
- Forces of Nature (1999) as Carl
- The Rage: Carrie 2 (1999) as Boyd
- Wildflowers (1999) as Teacher
- Brokedown Palace (1999) as Bill Marano
- Drowning on Dry Land (1999) as Les
- Martial Law (1999, TV Series) as Adam Pender
- Roswell (1999–2002, TV Series) as Jeff Parker
- The Strip (2000, TV Series) as Lt. Wolfe
- The Specials (2000) as Eight
- ER (2000, TV Series) as Carter's Doctor
- Gypsy 83 (2001) as Ray Vale
- Jon Good's Wife (2001) as Jake Stabler
- The Good Girl (2002) as Mr. Worther
- Bug (2002) as Record Store Owner
- Fastlane (2002, TV Series) as Papa John
- Employee of the Month (2002) as Herb
- Wuthering Heights (2003, TV Movie) as Earnshaw
- Peacemakers (2003, TV Series) as Marshall Dan Parks
- Law & Order (2003, TV Series) as Teddy Connor
- Carnivàle (2003, TV Series) as Phineas Boffo
- Red Zone (2003) as Chief Macintyre
- Torque (2004) as Sheriff Barnes
- Tom 51 (2004)
- CSI: Miami (2005, TV Series) as Brett Adams
- Lucky 13 (2005) as Mr. Baker
- We Jam Econo (2005) as Himself
- X – Live in Los Angeles (2005) as Himself
- The Darwin Awards (2006) as Guy in Bar No. 2
- Live Freaky! Die Freaky! (2006) as Tex
- Jammin (2007, TV Series) as Himself
- Ten Inch Hero (2007) as Trucker
- The Sandpiper (2007) as Wolf
- Absent Father (2008) as Tony
- Man Maid (2008) as Sissy Tailor
- One Tree Hill (2008, TV Series) as Mick Wolf
- The Unknowing (2009) as Train Conductor
- Wizards of Waverly Place (2009, TV Series) as Superintendent Spellman
- Tom Cool (2009) as Mac Angel
- Pleased to Meet Me (2013) as Pete Jones
- Zombex (2013) as Seamus O'Connor
- Electric Slide (2014) as Detective Bill Holiday
- Childrens Hospital (2016, TV Series) as X
- You're Gonna Miss Me (2017) as Jake Fillmore
- All Creatures Here Below (2018) as Uncle Doug
- My Little One (2019) as Matt
- Quantum Cowboys (2022) as John the Gunslinger / John the Bartender / John the Businessman
- D.O.A. (2022) as Frank Bigelow
- The Lowdown (2025) as Marlon
