= Tyler Willman =

American musician

Ty Willman
- Born: Tyler Willman
- Genres: Alternative rock, post-grunge, psychedelic rock
- Occupation: Musician
- Instruments: Guitar, vocals
- Years active: 1989–present
- Formerly of: Green Apple Quick Step, Calm Down Juanita, Devilhead, Novatone, Inspector Luv And The Ride Me Babys

Tyler "Ty" Willman is an American guitarist, vocalist, and songwriter who lives in Seattle, Washington. He is probably best known for his work with the Seattle-based band Green Apple Quick Step. He briefly fronted the band Devilhead and helped form Calm Down Juanita.

== Biography ==
Ty Willman was a founding member of the Tacoma, Washington-based band Inspector Luv and the Ride Me Babys, which he fronted, with guitarists Steve Ross and Dan Kempthorne, drummer Bob Martin and bassist Eric Munday. They recorded a limited edition 7" purple vinyl four-song EP, called Another World and released 700 numbered copies of it on Aroma Records in 1989. By 1992 that band had become Seattle's Green Apple Quick Step, with mostly the same personnel and a new bassist. Willman, guitarists Kempthorn and Ross, drummer Bob 'Mink' Martin, and a new singer-bassist, Mari Ann Braeden, went on to record three albums, releasing only the first two: Wonderful Virus in 1993, and Reloaded in 1995, both on The Medicine Label.

Always involved in many side-projects, Willman worked on Mike McCready's project, $10,000 Gold Chain; a collaboration that also included Mari Ann Braeden and produced the song Oh! Sweet Nuthin' for the 1996 soundtrack to the film The Cable Guy and he worked with the rest of GAQS on writing and performing Dizzy for the 1995 soundtrack to the film The Basketball Diaries.

He sang with Devilhead, with Kevin Wood and former members of Hater, recording lead vocals for one song, Buying Milk, on their album Pest Control, released in 1996 on Loosegroove Records.

He recorded backing vocals on The Skies Magnify Me, with Brandon and Ben Curtis and Joseph Butcher for UFOFU, on their CD UFOFU, released on the Medicine Label in 1997.

Willman and session drummer kevtone formed the Seattle-based studio band Calm Down Juanita, a writing collaboration that produced two albums; an eponymous 7-song debut EP in 1998, and a full-length CD in 2002, entitled Undertown. These albums featured several other notable musicians, including, again, fellow GAQS member, bassist Mari Ann Braeden, bassist and recording engineer Steve Feasley, Josh Freese, Stone Gossard, bassist Cole Peterson, and saxophonist Skerik.

Starting in 1998, Willman also worked with Stone Gossard on Gossard's first solo album, Bayleaf, recording during Gossard's visits to Willman's house and released in 2001. Willman sang lead vocals on three songs, Cadillac, Unhand Me, and Fend It Off, as well as background vocals on the rest of the album.

Willman also formed a number of other projects. In July 1999, he and former Gigolo Aunt, Phil Hurley formed Hula Bess.

He wrote Leaving California; recorded with Shawn Smith on guitar and bass guitar and Michael Shrieve on drums, for Smith's 2003 album, Shield of Thorns, released on Establishmentstore Records.

He was frontman for the band Novatone, for its 2005 album release on Wax Orchard Records, Time Can't Wait, which also featured Dave Krusen and Cody Davis, as well as a guest appearance by Shawn Smith.

Later, in 2007–2008, he formed Mass Sugar, which was referred to as a "part acoustic indie rock, part groovy jam band".

In 2009, he reconstituted Green Apple Quick Step for a few 2010 "reunion" performances, including gigs at Tacoma's Hell's Kitchen and Seattle's Crocodile Café. Their lineup as of May 2010 consisted of Willman on lead vocals, Christa Wells on vocals, Dana Turner on guitar, Geoff Reading on drums, and guest guitarist Mike Squires.

== See also ==
- Calm Down Juanita
- Devilhead
- Green Apple Quick Step
